= Dalmatia =

Historical region in Croatia and Montenegro

Dalmatia Dalmacija (Croatian) Dalmazia (Italian)
- Historical region of Croatia^{1}
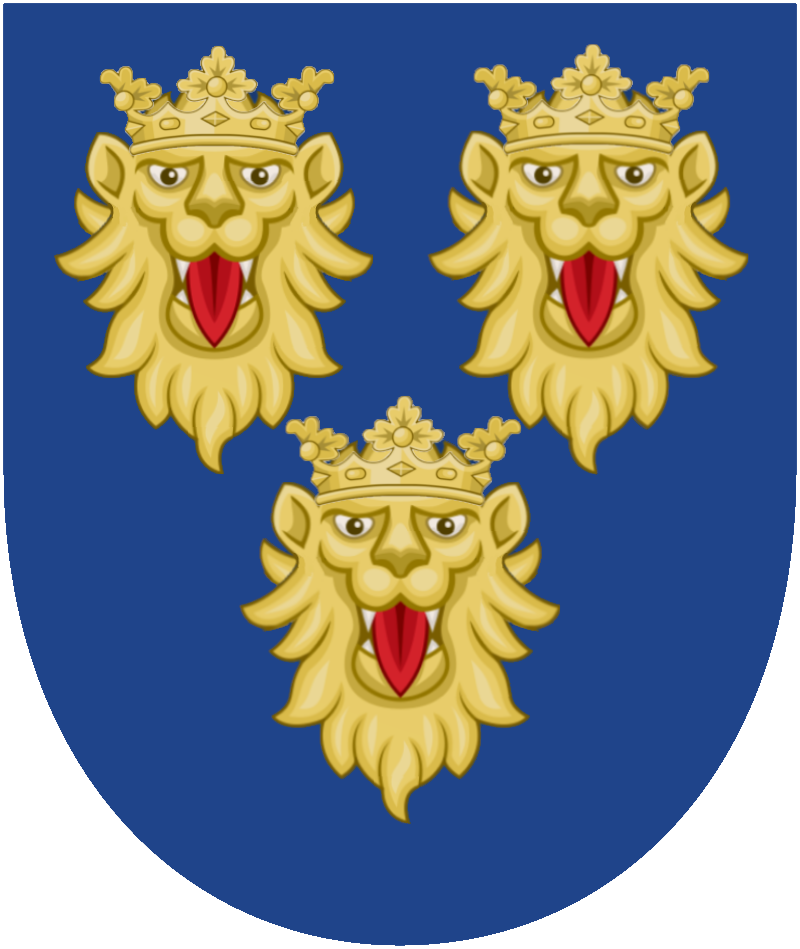
- Flag Coat of arms

- Dalmatia^{2}; Sometimes regarded as Dalmatia: Gračac Municipality: Rab Island; Bay of Kotor area in Montenegro
- Country: Croatia; Montenegro
- Largest city: Split

Area^{3}
  - Total: 12,190 km^{2} (4,710 sq mi)
- Highest elevation (Dinara): 1,831 m (6,007 ft)

Population (2021)^{3}
  - Total: 803,930
  - Density: 65.95/km^{2} (170.8/sq mi)
- Dalmatia is not designated as an official subdivision of Croatia; it is a historical region. The flag and arms below are also unofficial/historical; none are legally defined at present. The map represents modern-day perception: historical boundaries of Dalmatia varied over centuries. The figures are an approximation based on statistical data for the four southernmost Croatian Counties (Zadar without Gračac, Šibenik-Knin, Split-Dalmatia, Dubrovnik-Neretva, Novalja, Rab and Lopar).

Dalmatia (/dælˈmeɪʃə, -tiə/; Croatian: Dalmacija [dǎlmatsija]; Italian: Dalmazia [dal'mattsja]) is a historical region located in modern-day Croatia and Montenegro, on the eastern shore of the Adriatic Sea. It is a narrow land belt stretching from the island of Rab in the north to the Bay of Kotor in the south. The Dalmatian Hinterland ranges in width from 50 kilometres in the north, to just a few kilometres in the south; it is mostly covered by the rugged Dinaric Alps. Seventy-nine islands (and about 500 islets) run parallel to the coast, the largest (in Dalmatia) being Brač, Pag, and Hvar. The largest city is Split, followed by Zadar, Šibenik, and Dubrovnik.

The name of the region stems from an Illyrian tribe called the Dalmatae, who lived in the area in classical antiquity. With the expansion of Rome, the province of Illyricum was established, and in the early 1st century it was reorganised into the province of Dalmatia, which stretched over a vast territory. Consequently, a Romance culture emerged, and the indigenous Illyrian population became romanised. Following the fall of the Western Roman Empire and the Migration Period, many different peoples passed through Dalmatia. While the local Illyro-Romans organized themselves around their city-states under Byzantine protection, the Croats arrived in the early 7th century and established the Duchy of Croatia, later becoming vassals of the Franks. With the Christianisation of the Croats, Slavic and Illyro-Roman elements began to intermingle in both language and culture. The Kingdom of Croatia was founded in 925, and in around 989 incorporated the Theme of Dalmatia, established prior in 867.

After Croatia entered into a personal union with Hungary in 1102, Dalmatian cities were frequently conquered or shifted their allegiances during the Middle Ages. The Republic of Venice controlled parts of Dalmatia from 1000 to 1358 and from 1420 to 1797, while the Republic of Ragusa existed from 1358 to 1808. The Ottoman Empire conquered much of the Croatian-Hungarian kingdom between the late 15th and late 17th century, reducing the territory that had been considered Dalmatia until then. Venice subsequently reconquered the Dalmatian Hinterland, shaping the borders of what is today considered Dalmatia. These borders were further consolidated during Napoleon’s Illyrian Provinces and the Austrian 19th-century Kingdom of Dalmatia. At the end of World War I in 1918, as a part of unified Triune Kingdom of Croatia, Slavonia and Dalmatia, Dalmatia became part of the State of Slovenes, Croats and Serbs. Its official name use was abolished in 1922, until a resurgence as Split-Dalmatia County in 1993 following Croatia’s independence.

== Definition ==
Province of Dalmatia during the Roman Empire

In antiquity, the Roman province of Dalmatia was much larger than the present-day region of Dalmatia, stretching from Istria in the north to modern-day Albania in the south. Dalmatia signified not only a geographical unit, but was an entity based on common culture and settlement types, an eastern Adriatic coastal belt with a Mediterranean climate, sclerophyllous vegetation of the Illyrian province, and a carbonate platform.

=== Modern area ===
The extent of the Kingdom of Dalmatia (blue) which existed within Austria-Hungary until 1918, on a map of modern-day Croatia and Montenegro.

Today, Dalmatia is a historical region only, not formally instituted in Croatian law. Its exact extent is therefore uncertain and subject to public perception. According to Lena Mirošević and Josip Faričić of the University of Zadar:

...the modern perception of Dalmatia is mainly based on the territorial extent of the Austrian Kingdom of Dalmatia, with the exception of Rab, which is geographically related to the Kvarner area and functionally to the Littoral–Gorski Kotar area, and with the exception of the Bay of Kotor, which was annexed to another state (Montenegro) after World War I. Simultaneously, the southern part of Lika and upper Pounje, which were not part of Austrian Dalmatia, became part of Zadar County. From the present-day administrative and territorial point of view, Dalmatia comprises the four Croatian littoral counties with seats in Zadar, Šibenik, Split, and Dubrovnik.

"Dalmatia" is therefore generally perceived to extend approximately to the borders of the Austrian-held Kingdom of Dalmatia, which inherited these borders from the preceding border treaties between the Republic of Venice and the Ottoman Empire, notably defined by the 'Linea Mocenigo' in the Treaty of Passarowitz (1718). However, due to territorial and administrative changes over the past century, the perception can be seen to have altered somewhat with regard to certain areas, and sources conflict as to their being part of the region in modern times:

- The Bay of Kotor area in Montenegro. With the subdivision of the Kingdom of Yugoslavia into oblasts in 1922, the whole of the Bay of Kotor from Sutorina to Sutomore was granted to the Zeta Oblast, so that the border of Dalmatia was formed at that point by the southern border of the former Republic of Ragusa. The Encyclopædia Britannica defines Dalmatia as extending "to the narrows of Kotor" (i.e. the southernmost tip of continental Croatia, the Prevlaka peninsula). Other sources, however, such as the Treccani encyclopedia and the Rough Guide to Croatia still include the Bay as being part of the region.
- The island of Rab, along with the small islands of Sveti Grgur and Goli Otok, were a part of the Kingdom of Dalmatia and are historically and culturally related to the region, but are today associated more with the Croatian Littoral, due to geographical vicinity and administrative expediency.
- Gračac municipality and northern Pag. A number of sources express the view that "from the modern-day administrative point of view", the extent of Dalmatia equates to the four southernmost counties of Croatia: Zadar, Šibenik-Knin, Split-Dalmatia, and Dubrovnik-Neretva. This definition does not include the Bay of Kotor, or the islands of Rab, Sveti Grgur, and Goli Otok. It also excludes the northern part of the island of Pag, which is part of the Lika-Senj County. However, it includes the Gračac municipality in Zadar County, which was not a part of the Kingdom of Dalmatia and is not traditionally associated with the region (but instead the region of Lika).

== Etymology ==
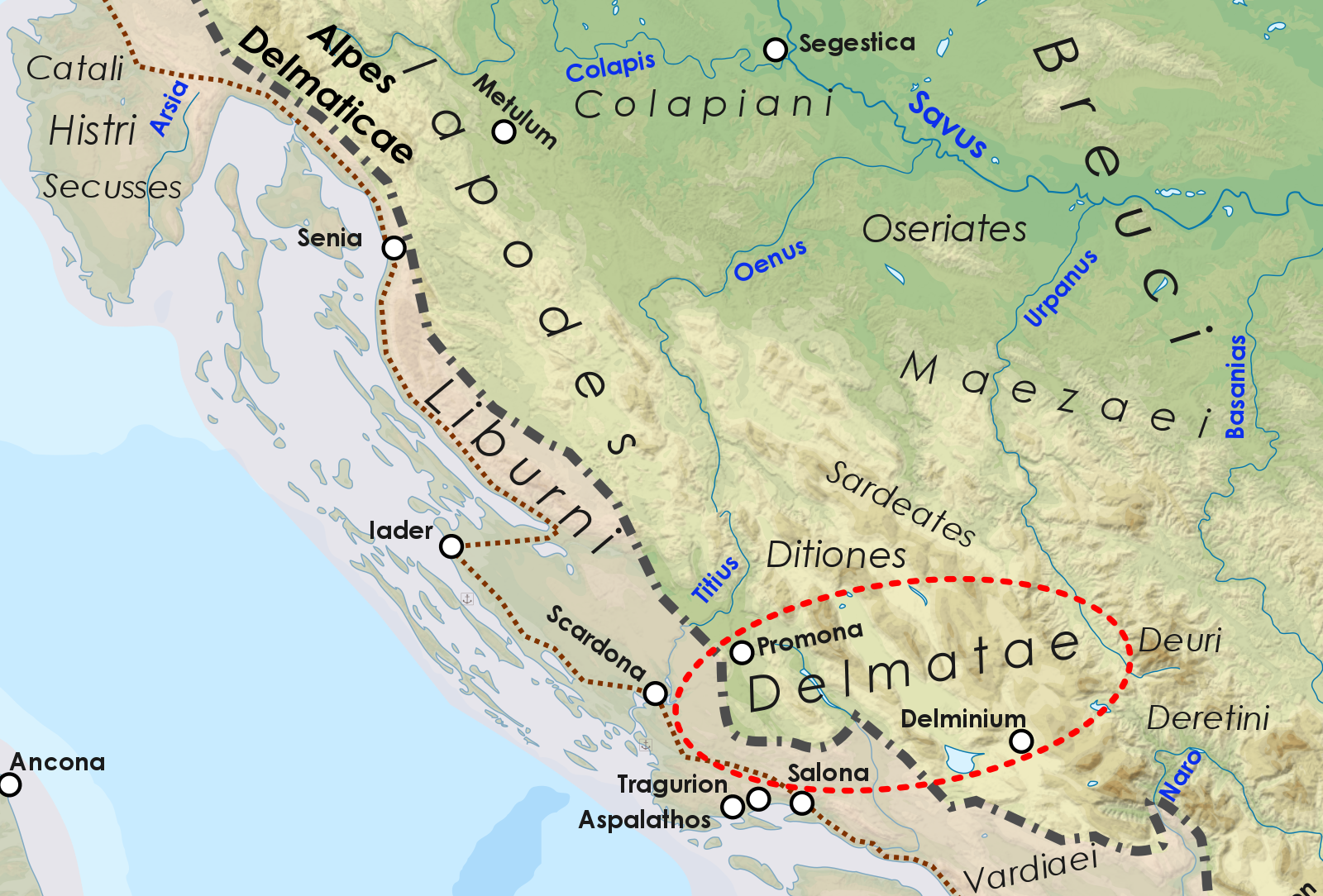
Delmatae in Illyria, c. 40 BC.

The regional name Dalmatia originates from Dalmatae, the name of the Illyrian tribe who were the original inhabitants of the region, and from which the later toponym, Delminium, is derived. It is considered by various academics to be connected to the Albanian dele and its variants which include the Gheg form delmë, meaning "sheep", and to the Albanian term delmer, "shepherd". Vladimir Orel argues that the Gheg form delmë hardly has anything in common with the name of Dalmatia because it represents a variant of dele with *-mā, which is ultimately from proto-Albanian *dailā. According to Danilo Savić, an argument against that connection is the lack of compelling evidence in ancient literary sources that Delmatae is derived from a word meaning "sheep". The ancient name Dalmana, derived from the same root, testifies to the advance of the Illyrians into the middle Vardar, between the ancient towns of Bylazora and Stobi. The medieval Slavic toponym Ovče Pole ("plain of sheep" in South Slavic) in the nearby region represents a related later development. According to István Schütz, in Albania, Delvinë represents a toponym linked to the root *dele.

The form of the regional name Dalmatia and the respective tribal name Dalmatae are later variants as was already noted by Appian (2nd century AD). His contemporary grammarian Velius Longus highlights in his treatise about orthography that the correct form of Dalmatia is Delmatia, and notes that Marcus Terentius Varro who lived about two centuries prior to Appian and Velius Longius, used the form Delmatia as it corresponded to the chief settlement of the tribe, Delminium. The toponym Duvno is a derivation from Delminium in Croatian via an intermediate form *Delminio in late antiquity. Its Latin form Dalmatia gave rise to its English name. In the Venetian language, once dominant in the area, it is spelled Dalmàssia, and in modern Italian Dalmazia. The modern Croatian spelling is Dalmacija, and the modern Serbian Cyrillic spelling is Далмација (pronounced [dǎlmaːt͡sija]).

== History ==
=== Antiquity ===
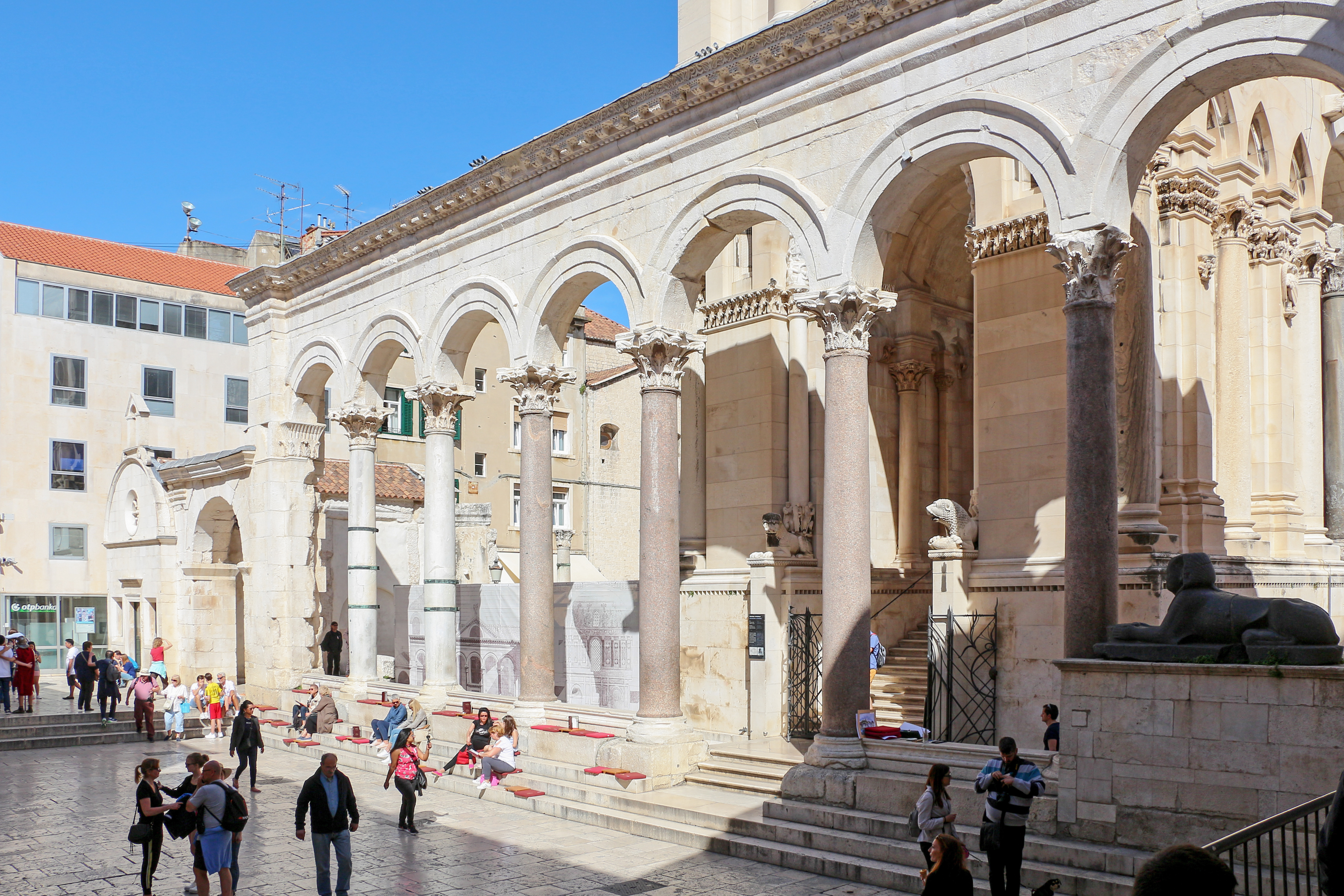
Palace of the Roman Emperor Diocletian, Split

Dalmatia's name is derived from the name of an Illyrian tribe called the Dalmatae who lived in the area of the eastern Adriatic coast in the 1st millennium BC. It was part of the Illyrian kingdom between the 4th century BC and the Illyrian Wars (220, 168 BC) when the Roman Republic established its protectorate south of the river Neretva. The name "Dalmatia" was in use probably from the second half of the 2nd century BC and certainly from the first half of the 1st century BC, defining a coastal area of the eastern Adriatic between the Krka and Neretva rivers. It was slowly incorporated into Roman possessions until the Roman province of Illyricum was formally established around 32–27 BC. In 9 AD, the Dalmatians raised the last in a series of revolts together with the Pannonians, but it was finally crushed and, in 10 AD, Illyricum was split into two provinces, Pannonia and Dalmatia, which spread into larger area inland to cover all of the Dinaric Alps and most of the eastern Adriatic coast.

The historian Theodor Mommsen wrote in his book, The Provinces of the Roman Empire, that all Dalmatia was fully romanized by the 4th century AD. However, analysis of archaeological material from that period has shown that the process of Romanization was rather selective. While urban centers, both coastal and inland, were almost completely romanized, the situation in the countryside was completely different. Despite the Illyrians being subject to a strong process of acculturation, they continued to speak their native language, worship their own gods and traditions, and follow their own social-political tribal organization which was adapted to Roman administration and political structure only in some necessities.

The fall of the Western Roman Empire, and the beginning of the Migration Period, left the region subject to Gothic rulers Odoacer and Theodoric the Great. They ruled Dalmatia from 480 to 535 AD, when it was restored to the Eastern Roman (Byzantine) Empire by Justinian I.

=== Middle Ages ===
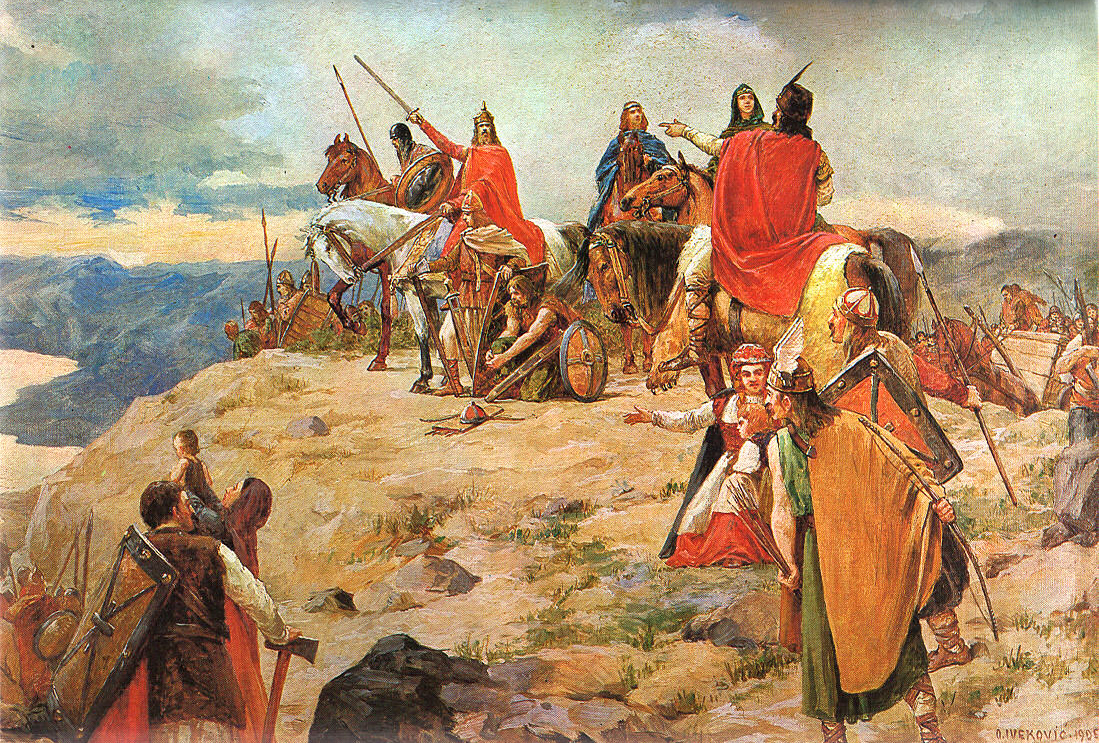
Oton Iveković, The Croats' Arrival at the Adriatic Sea

In the Early Middle Ages, the territory of the Byzantine province of Dalmatia reached in the north up to the river Sava, and was part of the Praetorian prefecture of Illyricum. In the middle of the 6th and the beginning of the 7th century began the Slavic migrations to the Balkans, which caused the Romance-speaking population, descendants of Romans and Illyrians (speaking Dalmatian), to flee to the coast and islands. The hinterland, semi-depopulated by the Barbarian Invasions, was settled by the Slavic tribes. The Slavs alongside Avars by 619 brought to ruin the capital Salona (an event that allowed for the settlement of the nearby Diocletian's Palace in Spalatum), Asseria, Varvaria, Burnum, Scardona, Epidaurum and Acruvium (resulting with the foundation of Kotor), and Epidaurum (resulting with the foundation of Ragusa). The newly-arrived tribes of Croats, Serbs and other Slavs founded Sclaviniae Croatia, Pagania, Zachlumia, Travunia and Konavle (also a small region of Bosnia, with Duklja and Serbia in nearby Praevalitana and Moesia).

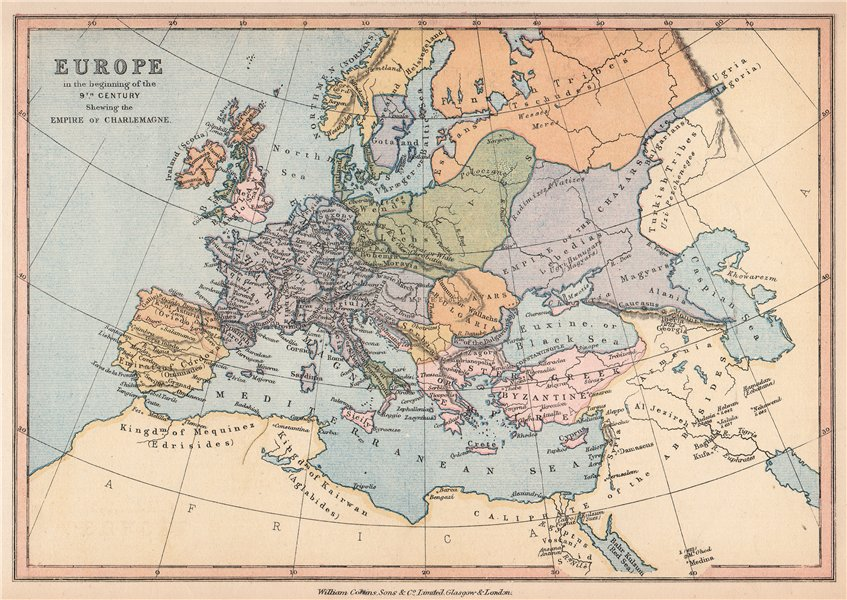
9th century Europe

In the early 9th century, the Eastern Adriatic coast including Dalmatia was the scene of the sphere of influence struggle between the Frankish and Byzantine Empire, but although the Byzantines have retained supremacy, Dalmatia became a meeting place between the West and the East. The meaning of the administrative-geographical term "Dalmatia" by 820 shrank to the coastal cities and their immediate hinterland – the Byzantine theme of Dalmatia. Its cities were the Romance-speaking Dalmatian city-states and remained influential as they were well fortified and maintained their connection with the Byzantine Empire. The original name of the cities was Jadera (Zadar; capital of the theme), Spalatum (Split), Crepsa (Cres), Arba (Rab), Tragurium (Trogir), Vecla (Krk), Ragusium (Dubrovnik) and Cattarum (Kotor). The language and the laws were initially Latin, but after a few centuries they developed their own neo-Latin language (the "Dalmatico"), that lasted until the late 19th century. The cities were maritime centres with a huge commerce mainly with the Italian peninsula and with the growing Republic of Venice. The Latin and Slavic communities were somewhat hostile at first, but as the Croats and Serbs became Christianized this tension increasingly subsided. A degree of cultural mingling soon took place, in some enclaves stronger, in others weaker, as Slavic influence and culture was more accentuated in Ragusa, Spalatum, and Tragurium.

In the mid-9th century, the Serbian principality gained prominence along a part of the eastern Adriatic coast. Contemporary sources, notably the Royal Frankish Annals, document that the Serbs controlled a part of Dalmatia, described as "Sorabos, quae natio magnam Dalmatiae partem obtinere dicitur". This early territorial expansion laid the foundation for subsequent political developments in the region.The emergence of organised political entities began with the consolidation of the first Serbian Vlastimirović dynasty from 610 to 960. During this period, two principal Serbian principalities emerged: Duklja (also known as Dioclea) in the southeast and Travunia in the northwest. These principalities were strategically positioned around the Bay of Kotor (Boka Kotorska), facilitating control over important maritime trade routes.

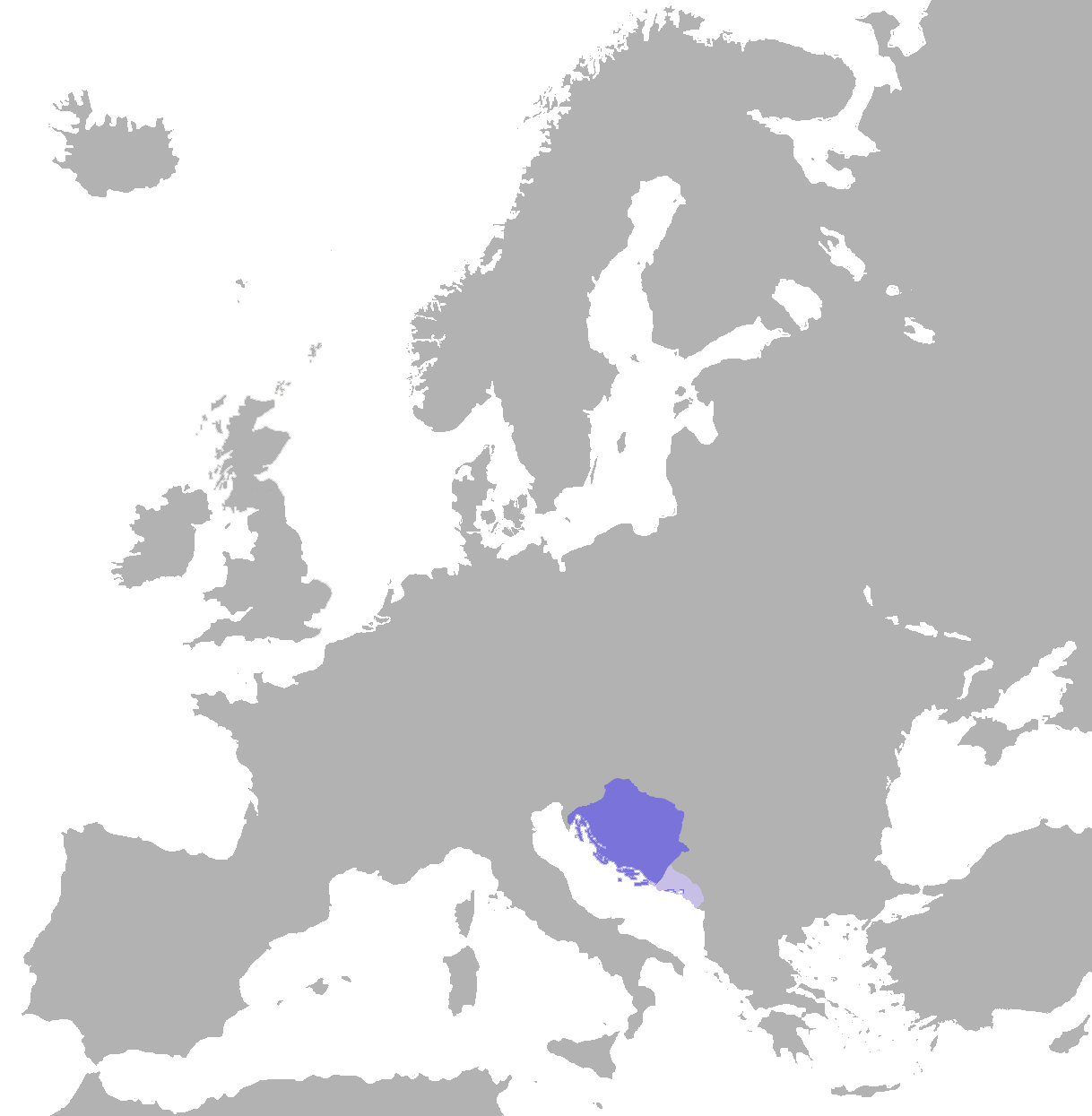
Croatia during the reign of King Tomislav (925 – 928).

In the first half of the 10th century, Croatia was elevated to a kingdom by Duke Tomislav who also extended his influence further southwards to Zachlumia. As an ally of the Byzantine Empire, the King was given the status of Protector of Dalmatia, and became its de facto ruler. Chronicler Thomas the Archdeacon relates that Stephen Držislav (r. 969 – 997) took the title "King of Dalmatia and Croatia", and that all subsequent rulers styled themselves in such manner. In the year 1000, at the invitation of Dalmatian city-states, an expedition of Venetian ships in coastal Istria and Dalmatia led by Doge Pietro II Orseolo conquered the Dalmatian cities and islands without much resistance and secured Venetian suzerainty in the area. From then on, with short interruptions, Venice became the leading power in Dalmatia and the Adriatic until its dissolution nearly eight hundred years later. On this occasion Doge Orseolo named himself "Duke of Dalmatia", starting the colonial empire of Venice. Orseolo led the Venetian fleet into the eastern Adriatic and gradually took control of most of it; first the islands of the Gulf of Kvarner and the city of Zadar, then Trogir and Split, followed by a successful naval battle with the Narentines upon which he took control of Korčula and Lastovo. The Narentine pirates, which had been causing trouble to Venetian ships in the Adriatic, were finally suppressed permanently. The Venetians, to whom the Dalmatians were already bound by language and culture, could afford to concede liberal terms as its main goal was to prevent the development of any dangerous political or commercial competitor on the eastern Adriatic. The seafaring community in Dalmatia looked to Venice as the new "queen" of the Adriatic Sea. In return for protection, the Romance cities of Dalmatia often furnished a contingent to the army or navy of their suzerain, and sometimes paid tribute either in money or in kind. Arbe (now Rab), for example, annually paid ten pounds of silk or five pounds of gold to Venice. The Dalmatian cities might elect their own chief magistrate, bishop, and judges; their Roman law remained valid, and they were even permitted to conclude separate alliances. In these centuries, the Dalmatian language started to disappear, assimilated by the Venetian language.

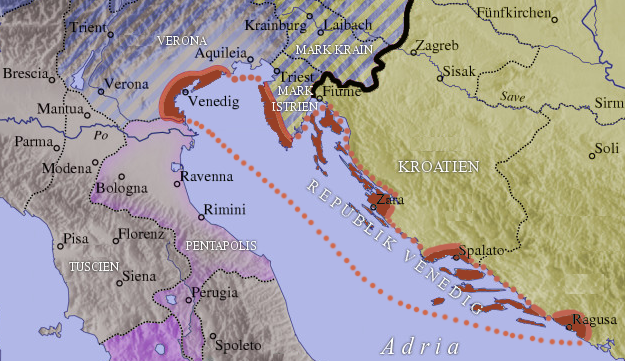
The Republic of Venice following the conquest of Dalmatia, 1000 AD.

At this time Venice had a firm control over the Adriatic Sea, strengthened by the expedition of Pietro's son Ottone in 1017. Krešimir III tried to restore the Dalmatian cities and had some success until 1018, when he was defeated by Venice allied with the Lombards. From the 1030s however, after the fall of Doge Otto Orseolo, Byzantium took control of most of the main coastal cities, while Croatian kings Stjepan I and his son Petar Krešimir IV succeeded in taking a substantial part of the coast back, so the latter also carried the title "King of Croatia and Dalmatia". In the subsequent period, the rulers of Croatia exerted some influence over Dalmatian cities and islands, occasionally taking control such as with the conquest of Zadar in the mid-11th century, though the ownership of this city changed intermittently between the Croats and the Venetians, who regained the city in the year 1050. Petar Krešimir IV expanded his rule to incorporate a number of Dalmatian cities and islands by 1069, attested by his gift of the island of Maun to the Monastery of St. Chrysogonus in that same year. Upon the death of King Demetrius Zvonimir of Croatia by the end of 1080s, the state entered a period of anarchy and would result in Hungarians under Coloman of Hungary taking control over former Dalmatian possessions along with the rest of the state by 1102.

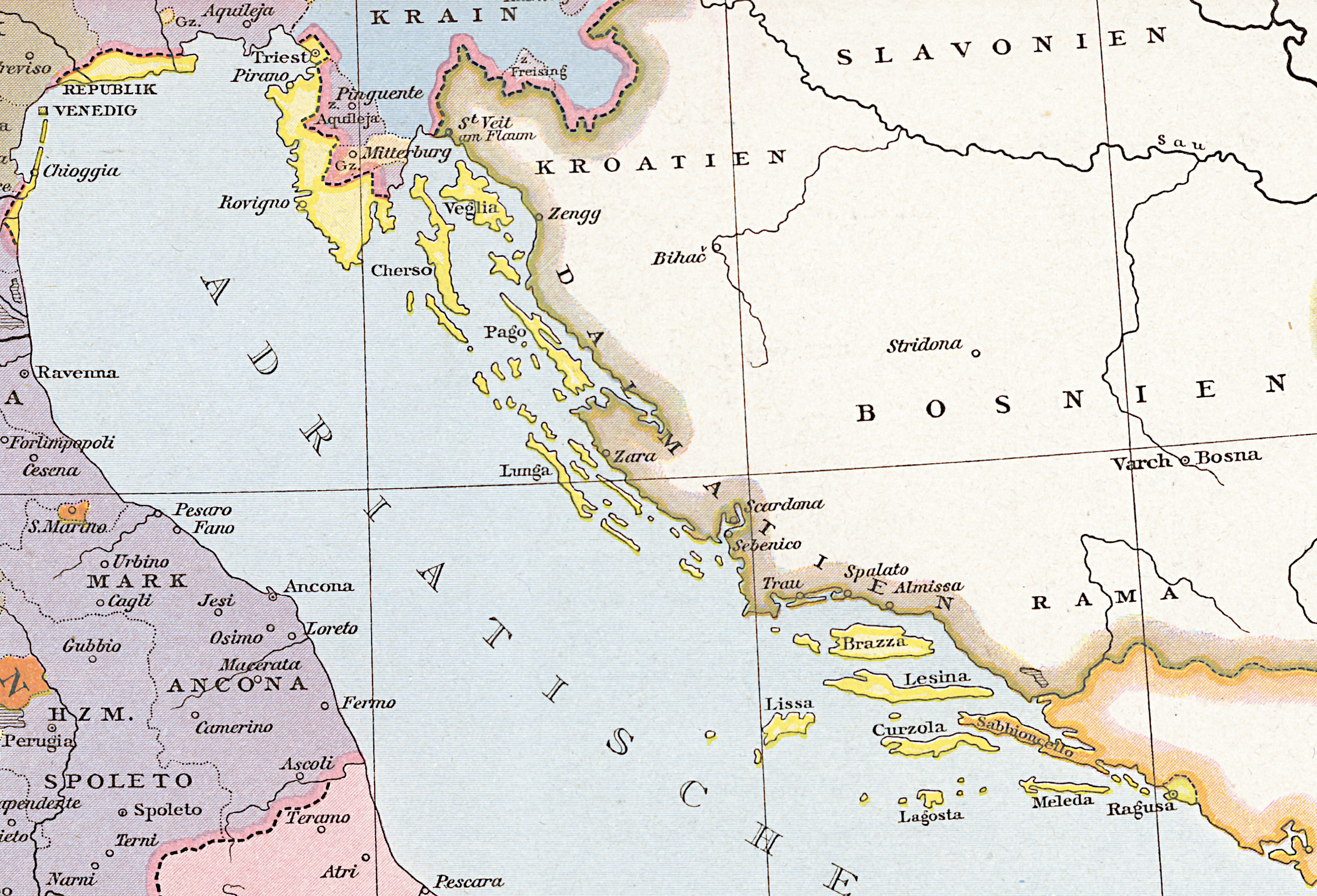
Venetian Dalmatia in c. 1250

In the High Medieval period, the Byzantine Empire was no longer able to expand its power consistently in Dalmatia, and was finally rendered impotent so far west by the Fourth Crusade. During the reign of King Emeric, the Dalmatian cities separated from Hungary by a treaty. Soon after, in the year 1202, the Venetians led by Doge Enrico Dandolo directed the army of Crusaders to reconquer for Venice the city of Zadar, an event known in history as the Siege of Zara. The late 13th century was marked by a decline in external hostilities. The Dalmatian cities started accepting complete foreign sovereignty, mainly that of the Republic of Venice. Venice would go on to control Zadar as well as other Dalmatian cities and islands for the next century and a half, albeit with constant internal and external conflicts, before briefly losing them to Hungary again in the Treaty of Zadar of 1358. This period of Hungarian influence in Dalmatia was further impacted by the Mongol invasion of Hungary in 1241. The Mongols severely impaired the feudal state, so much so that that same year, King Béla IV had to take refuge in Dalmatia, as far south as the Fortress of Klis. The Mongols attacked the Dalmatian cities for the next few years but eventually withdrew without major success.

At the beginning of the 14th century and until 1322, some Dalmatian cities were under the control of the noble Šubić family which held them until they were defeated at the Battle of Bliska by a coalition of nobles, Dalmatian cities and royal troops loyal to Charles I of Hungary. In 1358, the people of Dubrovnik achieved independence from Venice, creating the Republic of Ragusa.

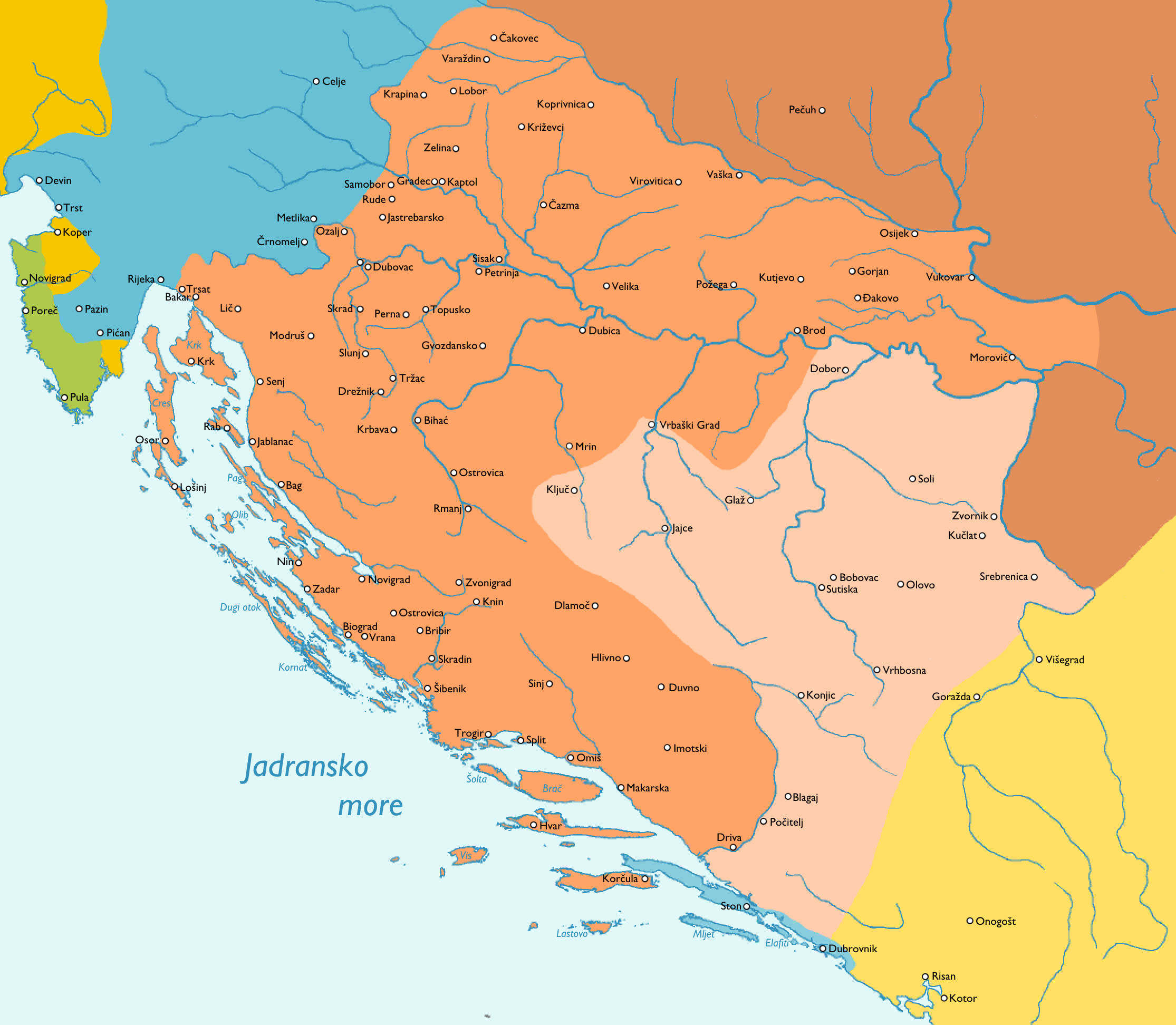
Croatia after the Treaty of Zadar (1358).

In the south, due to its protected location, Kotor became a major city and main port of the Serbian Kingdom and then of the Serbian Empire for the salt trade. The area was prosperous during the 14th century under the rule of Emperor of the Serbs Dušan the Mighty, who encouraged law enforcement, which helped the Bay of Kotor to become a safe place for doing business.

In 1389, Tvrtko I, founder of the Kingdom of Bosnia, was able to control the Adriatic littoral between Kotor and Šibenik, and even claimed control over the northern coast up to Rijeka, and his own independent ally, the Republic of Ragusa. This was only temporary, as Hungary and the Venetians continued their struggle over Dalmatia after Tvrtko's death in 1391. By this time, the whole of the Hungarian and Croatian Kingdom was facing increasing internal difficulties, as a 20-year civil war ensued between the Capetian House of Anjou from the Kingdom of Naples, and King Sigismund of the House of Luxembourg. During the war, the losing contender, Ladislaus of Naples, sold his "rights" to Dalmatia to the Republic of Venice in the year 1409 for a mere 100,000 ducats. The much more centralised Republic came to control the coast and near hinterland of Dalmatia by the year 1420, and it was to remain under Venetian rule for 377 years (1420–1797).

=== Early modern period ===
Dalmatia was first and finally sold to the Republic of Venice in 1409 but Venetian Dalmatia was not fully consolidated until 1420. The Republic of Venice in 1420 controlled the coastal part of Dalmatia and the islands, with the southern enclave, the Bay of Kotor, being called Venetian Albania. Venetian was the commercial lingua franca in the Mediterranean at that time, and it heavily influenced Dalmatian and to a lesser degree coastal Croatian (Chakavian) and Albanian.

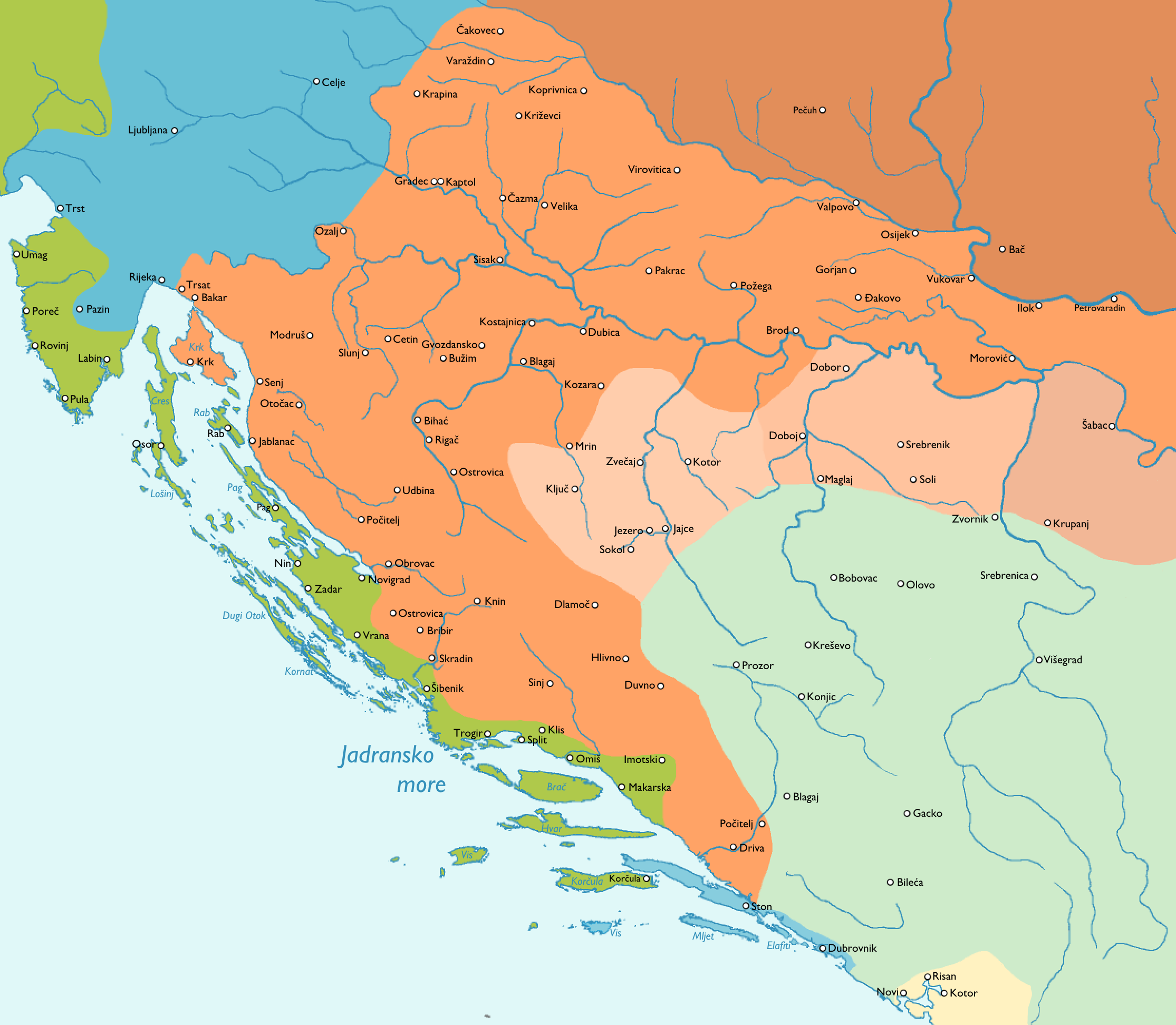
Dalmatia divided between Venetian Dalmatia and the Hungarian-Croatian Kingdom in 1469.

The southern city of Ragusa (Dubrovnik) became de facto independent in 1358 through the Treaty of Zadar when Venice relinquished its suzerainty over it to Louis I of Hungary. In 1481, Ragusa switched allegiance to the Ottoman Empire. This gave its tradesmen advantages such as access to the Black Sea, and the Republic of Ragusa was the fiercest competitor to Venice's merchants in the 15th and 16th centuries. Originally, Latin was used in official documents of the Republic. Italian came into use in the 1420s. Both languages were used in official correspondence by the Republic. The Republic was influenced by the Venetian language and the Tuscan dialect.

In the early 16th century, most of the Dalmatian hinterland which was controlled by the Hungarian-Croatian Kingdom was lost to the Ottoman Empire by the 1520s which formed the Croatian vilayet that became incorporated into the Sanjak of Klis after the Siege of Klis (1537), and decades later into the Bosnia Eyalet. With the fall of the Hungarian-Venetian border in Dalmatia, Venetian Dalmatia now directly bordered with Ottoman Dalmatia. Venetians still perceived this inner hinterland as once part of Croatia, calling it as "Banadego" (lands of Ban i.e. Banate). The Republic of Venice was also one of the powers most hostile to the Ottoman Empire's expansion, and participated in many wars against it, but also promoted peace negotiations and cultural and religious coexistence and tolerance.

Dalmatia divided between Venetian Dalmatia and the Ottoman Empire in 1558.

Since the 16th century Slavicized Vlachs, Serbs and other South Slavs arrived both as martolos in Ottoman service and refugees fleeing from Ottoman territory to the Military Frontier and Venetian Dalmatia. As the Ottomans took control of the hinterland, many Christians took refuge in the coastal cities of Dalmatia. In Ottoman Dalmatia a number of people converted to Islam to attain freedom and privileges. The border between the Dalmatian hinterland and the Ottoman Bosnia and Herzegovina greatly fluctuated until the Morean War, when the Venetian capture of Knin and Sinj set much of the borderline at its near-current position, defined by the 'Linea Grimani' in the Treaty of Karlowitz (1699).

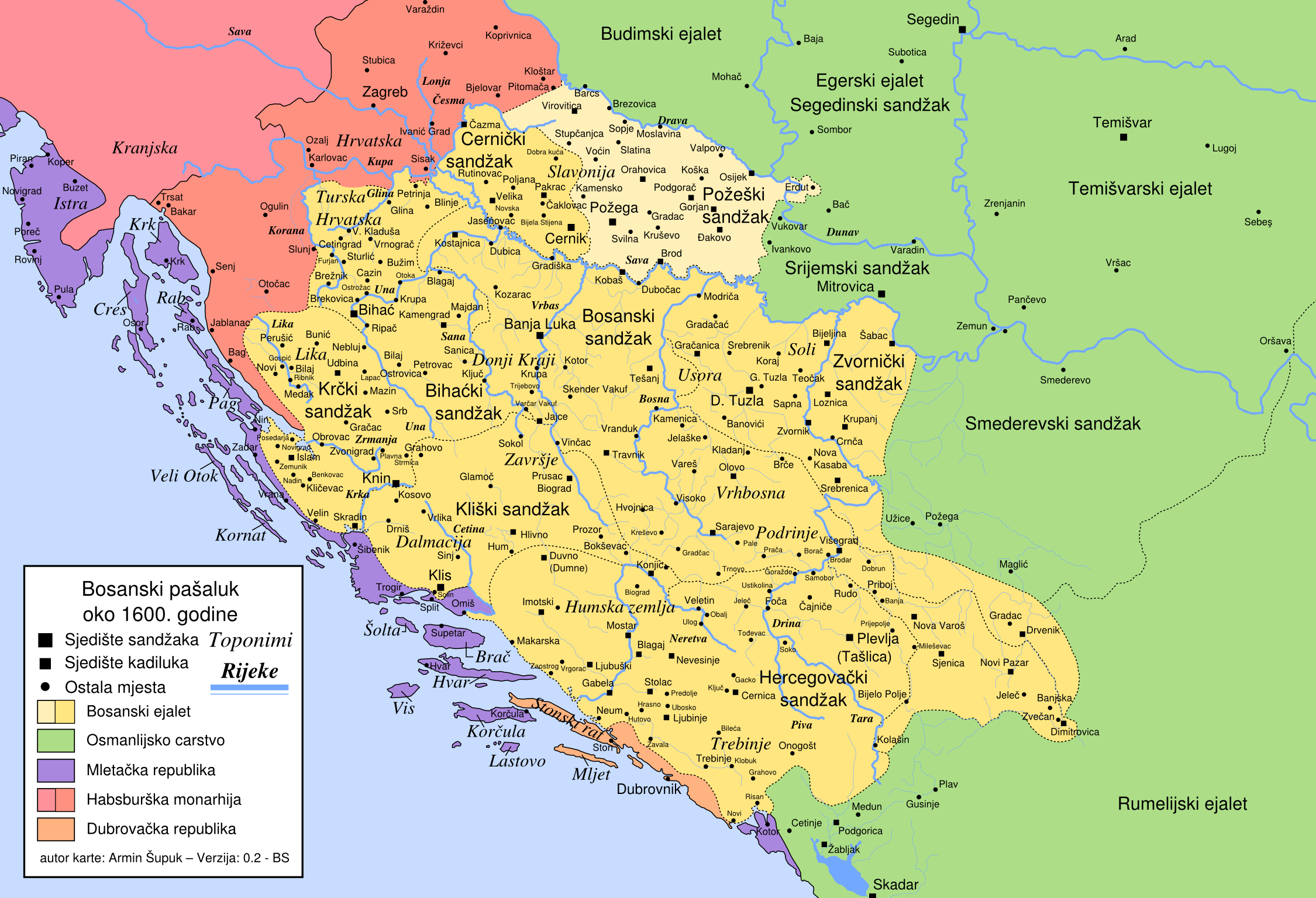
Dalmatia divided between Venetian Dalmatia and the Ottoman Bosnia Eyalet in 1600.

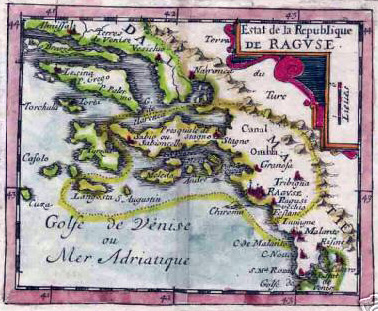
Map of the Republic of Ragusa, dated 1678.

After the Great Turkish War and the Treaty of Passarowitz (1718), which further solidified the Venetian-Ottoman border defined by the 'Linea Mocenigo' (resembling the modern border between Croatia and Bosnia and Herzegovina), more peaceful times made Dalmatia experience a period of certain economic and cultural growth in the 18th century, with the re-establishment of trade and exchange with the hinterland. This period was abruptly interrupted with the fall of the Republic of Venice in 1797. Napoleon's troops stormed the region and ended the independence of the Republic of Ragusa as well, saving it from occupation by the Russian Empire and Montenegro.

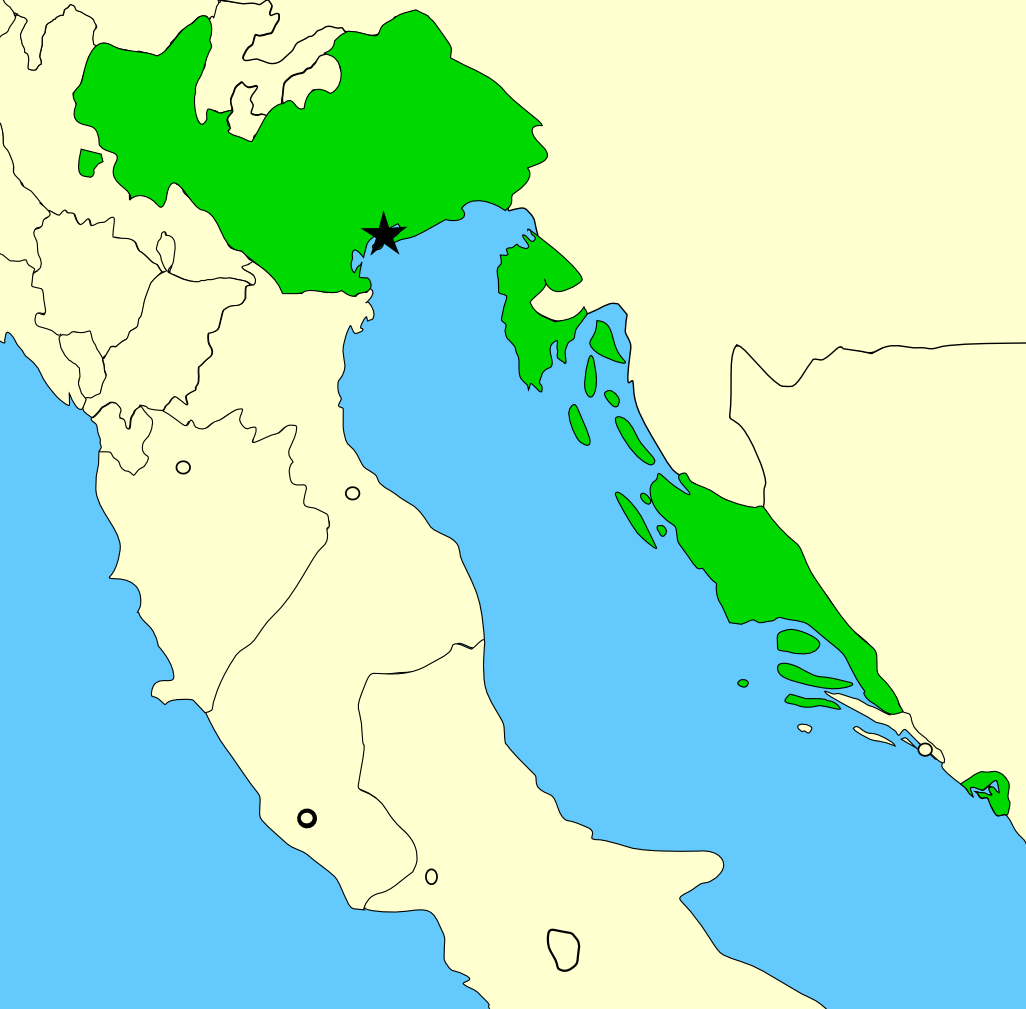
Dalmatian possessions of the Republic of Venice in 1797.

In 1805, Napoleon created his Kingdom of Italy around the Adriatic Sea, annexing to it the former Venetian Dalmatia from Istria to Kotor. In 1808, he annexed the just conquered Republic of Ragusa to the Kingdom. A year later, in 1809, he removed Venetian Dalmatia from his Kingdom of Italy and created the Illyrian Provinces, which were annexed to France, and named Marshal General Jean-de-Dieu Soult the Duke of Dalmatia.

Napoleon's rule in Dalmatia was marked with war and high taxation, which caused several rebellions. On the other hand, French rule greatly contributed to Illyrian movement (the first newspaper in Croatian was published then in Zadar, Il Regio Dalmata – Kraglski Dalmatin), the legal system and infrastructure were finally modernised somewhat in Dalmatia, and the educational system flourished. French rule brought a lot of improvements in infrastructure; many roads were built or reconstructed. Napoleon himself blamed Marshal of the Empire Auguste de Marmont, the governor of Dalmatia, that too much money was spent. However, in 1813, the Habsburgs once again declared war on France and, by the following year, had restored control over Dalmatia.

From the Middle Ages to the 19th century, Italian and Slavic communities in Dalmatia had lived peacefully side by side, as they did not have a genuine national identification, given that they generically defined themselves as "Dalmatians", of "Romance" or "Slavic" culture.

=== 19th century ===
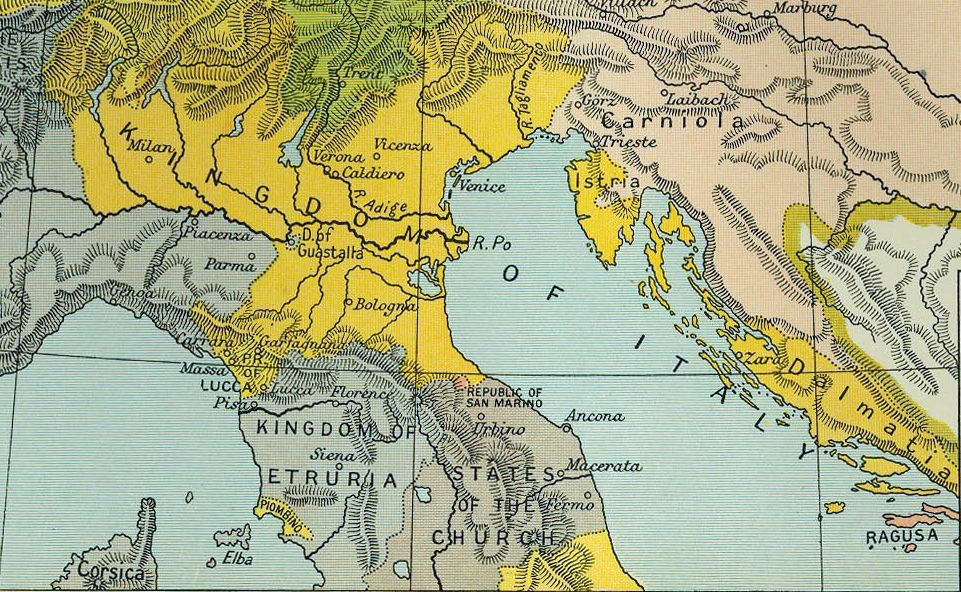
The Napoleonic Kingdom of Italy from 1806 to 1810 included Dalmatia that had belonged to Venice until 1797.

At the Congress of Vienna in 1815, Dalmatia was granted as a province to the Emperor of Austria. It was officially known as the Kingdom of Dalmatia.

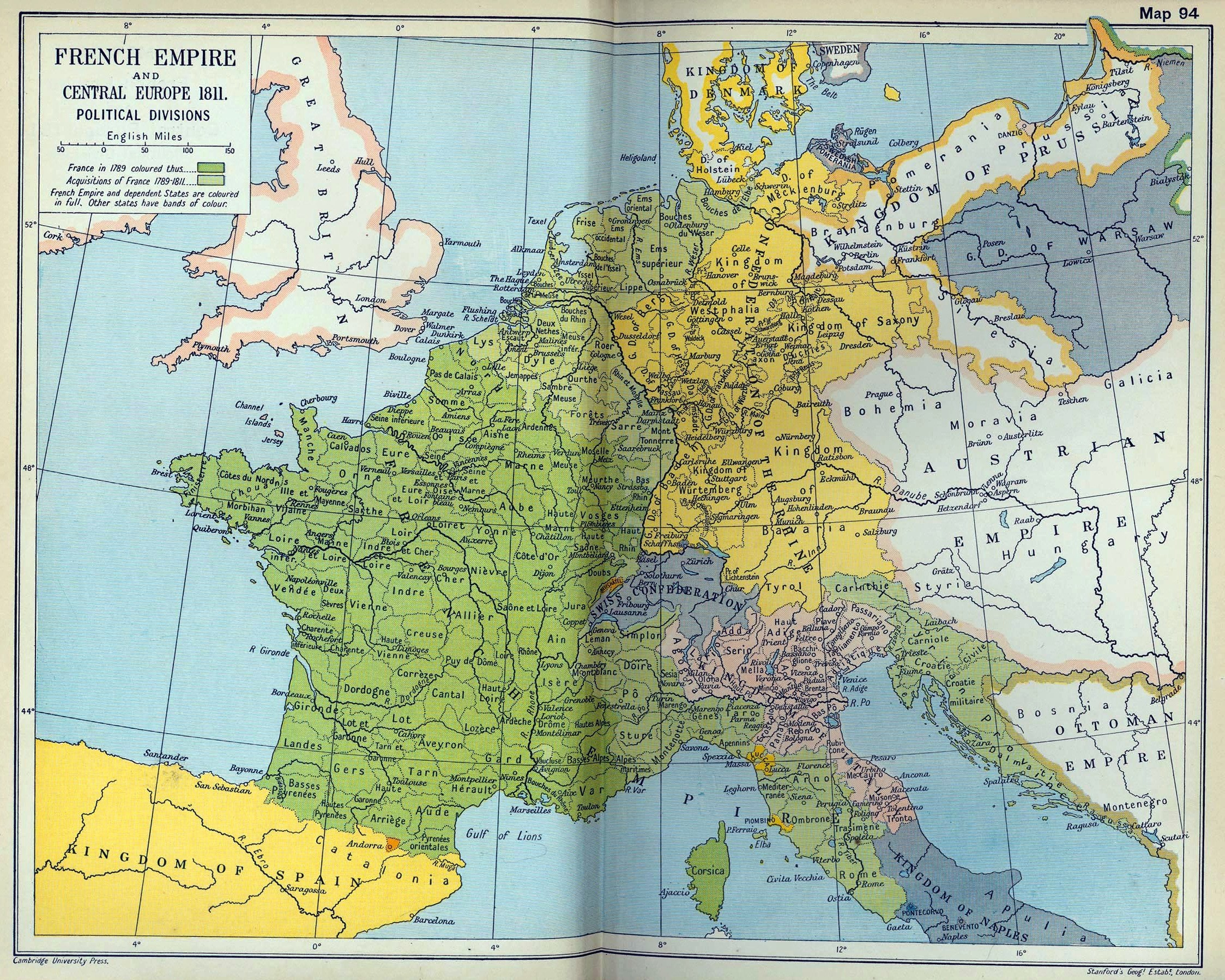
Dalmatia as a part of the Illyrian Provinces in 1811.

In 1848, the Croatian Parliament (Sabor) published the People's Requests, in which they requested among other things the abolition of serfdom and the unification of Dalmatia and Croatia. The Dubrovnik municipality was the most outspoken of all the Dalmatian communes in its support for unification with Croatia. A letter was sent from Dubrovnik to Zagreb with pledges to work for this idea. In 1849, Dubrovnik continued to lead the Dalmatian cities in the struggle for unification. A large-scale campaign was launched in the Dubrovnik paper L'Avvenire (The Future) based on a clearly formulated programme: the federal system for the Habsburg territories, the inclusion of Dalmatia into Croatia and the Slavic brotherhood. The President of the Council of Kingdom of Dalmatia was Baron Vlaho Getaldić.

In the same year, the first issue of the Dubrovnik almanac appeared, Flower of the National Literature (Dubrovnik, cvijet narodnog književstva), in which Petar Preradović published his noted poem "Pjesma Dubrovniku" (Poem to Dubrovnik). This and other literary and journalistic texts, which continued to be published, contributed to the awakening of the national consciousness reflected in efforts to introduce the Croatian language into schools and offices, and to promote Croatian books. The Emperor Franz Joseph brought the March Constitution which prohibited the unification of Dalmatia and Croatia and also any further political activity with this end in view. The political struggle of Dubrovnik to be united with Croatia, which was intense throughout 1848–49, did not succeed at that time.

Many Dalmatian Italians looked with sympathy towards the Risorgimento movement that fought for the unification of Italy. However, after 1866, when the Veneto and Friuli regions were ceded by the Austrians to the newly formed Kingdom Italy, Dalmatia remained part of the Austro-Hungarian Empire, together with other Italian-speaking areas on the eastern Adriatic. This triggered the gradual rise of Italian irredentism among many Italians in Dalmatia, who demanded the unification of the Austrian Littoral, Fiume and Dalmatia with Italy. The Italians in Dalmatia supported the Italian Risorgimento: as a consequence, the Austrians saw the Italians as enemies and favored the Slav communities of Dalmatia.

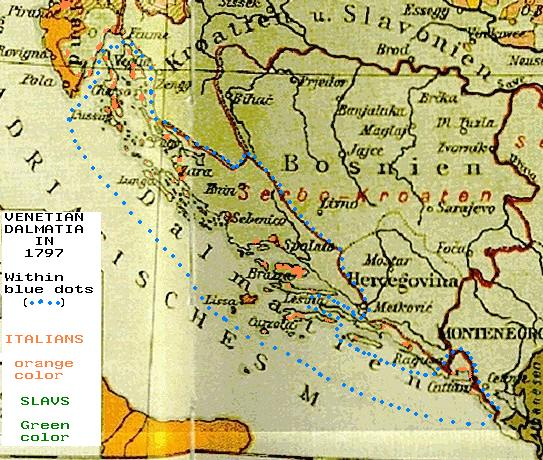
Austrian linguistic map from 1896. In green the areas where Slavs were the majority of the population, in orange the areas where Istrian Italians and Dalmatian Italians were the majority of the population. The boundaries of Venetian Dalmatia in 1797 are delimited with blue dots.

During the meeting of the Council of Ministers of 12 November 1866, Emperor Franz Joseph I of Austria outlined a wide-ranging project aimed at the Germanization or Slavization of the areas of the empire with an Italian presence:

His Majesty expressed the precise order that action be taken decisively against the influence of the Italian elements still present in some regions of the Crown and, appropriately occupying the posts of public, judicial, masters employees as well as with the influence of the press, work in South Tyrol, Dalmatia and Littoral for the Germanization and Slavization of these territories according to the circumstances, with energy and without any regard. His Majesty calls the central offices to the strong duty to proceed in this way to what has been established.

— Franz Joseph I of Austria, Council of the Crown of 12 November 1866

Dalmatia, especially its maritime cities, once had a substantial Italian-speaking population (Dalmatian Italians). According to Austrian censuses, the Italian speakers in Dalmatia formed 12.5% of the population in 1865, but this was reduced to 2.8% in 1910. There was a constant decline in the Italian population, in a context of repression that also took on violent connotations. During this period, Austrians carried out an aggressive anti-Italian policy through a forced Slavization of Dalmatia. Before 1859, Italian was the language of administration, education, the press, and the Austrian navy; people who wished to acquire higher social standing and separate from the Slav peasantry became Italians. In the years after 1866, Italians lost their privileges in Austria-Hungary, their assimilation of the Slavs came to an end, and they found themselves under growing pressure by other rising nations; with the rising Slav tide after 1890, italianized Slavs reverted to being Croats. Austrian rulers found use of the racial antagonism and financed Slav schools and promoted Croatian as the official language, and many Italians chose voluntary exile.

The Italian population in Dalmatia was concentrated in the major coastal cities. In the city of Split in 1890 there were 1,971 Dalmatian Italians (9% of the population), in Zadar 7,672 (27%), in Šibenik 1,090 (5%), in Kotor 646 (12%) and in Dubrovnik 356 (3%). In other Dalmatian localities, according to Austrian censuses, Italians experienced a sudden decrease: in the twenty years 1890-1910, in Rab they went from 225 to 151, in Vis from 352 to 92, in Pag from 787 to 23, completely disappearing in almost all inland locations.

While Slavic-speakers made up 80-95% of the Dalmatia populace, only Italian language schools existed until 1848, and due to restrictive voting laws, the Italian-speaking aristocratic minority retained political control of Dalmatia. Only after Austria liberalised elections in 1870, allowing more majority Slavs to vote, did Croatian parties gain control. Croatian finally became an official language in Dalmatia in 1883, along with Italian. Yet minority Italian-speakers continued to wield strong influence, since Austria favoured Italians for government work, thus in the Austrian capital of Dalmatia, Zara, the proportion of Italians continued to grow, making it the only Dalmatian city with an Italian majority.

In 1861 the meeting of the first Dalmatian Assembly took place, with representatives from Dubrovnik. Representatives of Kotor came to Dubrovnik to join the struggle for unification with Croatia. The citizens of Dubrovnik gave them a festive welcome, flying Croatian flags from the ramparts and exhibiting the slogan Ragusa with Kotor. The Kotorans elected a delegation to go to Vienna; Dubrovnik nominated Niko Pucić, who went to Vienna to demand not only the unification of Dalmatia with Croatia, but also the unification of all Croatian territories under one common Sabor. During this period, the Habsburgs carried out an aggressive anti-Italian policy through a forced Slavisation of the region.

=== 20th century ===
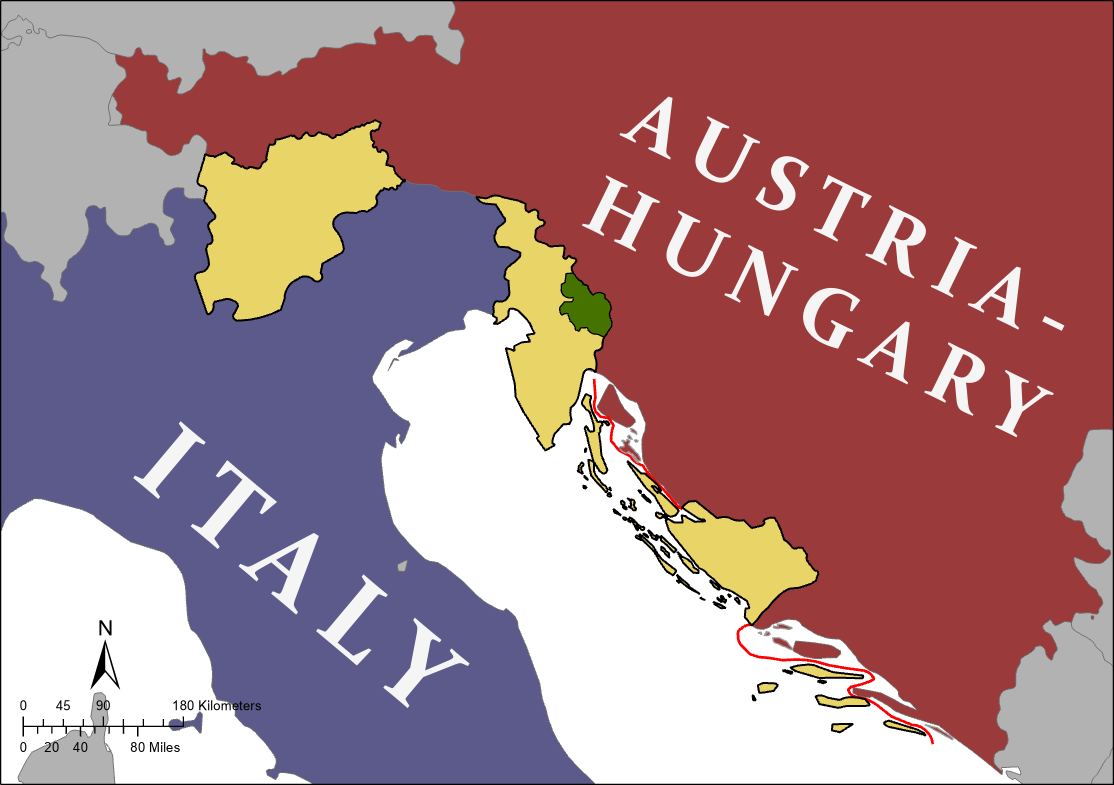
Territories promised to Italy by the London Pact (1915), i.e. Trentino-Alto Adige, the Julian March and Dalmatia (tan), and the Snežnik Plateau area (green). Dalmatia, after the WWI, however, was not assigned to Italy but to Yugoslavia.

In 1905, a dispute arose in the Austrian Imperial Council over whether Austria should pay for Dalmatia. It has been argued that in the conclusion of the April Laws is written "given by Banus Count Keglevich of Bužim", which explained the historical affiliation of Dalmatia to Hungary. Two years later Dalmatia elected representatives to the Austrian Imperial Council.

Until 1909, both Italian and Croatian were recognized as official languages in Dalmatia. After 1909, Italian lost its official status, thus it could no longer be used in the public and administrative sphere. All but one of the 82 urban communities got Slav government majority by 1910.

Dalmatia was a strategic region during World War I that both Italy and Serbia intended to seize from Austria-Hungary. Italy joined the Triple Entente Allies in 1915 upon agreeing to the Treaty of London that guaranteed Italy the right to annex a large portion of Dalmatia in exchange for Italy's participation on the Allied side. From 5–6 November 1918, Italian forces were reported to have reached Vis, Lastovo, Šibenik, and other localities on the Dalmatian coast. By the end of hostilities in November 1918, the Italian military had seized control of the entire portion of Dalmatia that had been guaranteed to Italy by the Treaty of London and by 17 November had seized Rijeka as well creating the first Governorate of Dalmatia. In 1918, Admiral Enrico Millo declared himself Italy's Governor of Dalmatia. Famous Italian nationalist Gabriele D'Annunzio supported the seizure of Dalmatia, and proceeded to Zadar in an Italian warship in December 1918. However, in spite of the guarantees of the Treaty of London to Italy of a large portion of Dalmatia and Italian military occupation of claimed territories of Dalmatia, during the peace settlement negotiations of 1919 to 1920, the Fourteen Points of Woodrow Wilson that advocated self-determination of nations took precedence, with Italy only being permitted to annex Zadar from Dalmatia, while the rest of Dalmatia was to be part of Yugoslavia.

At the end of World War I, the Austrian Empire disintegrated, and Dalmatia was again split between the Kingdom of Serbs, Croats and Slovenes (later the Kingdom of Yugoslavia) which controlled most of it, and the Kingdom of Italy which held small portions of northern Dalmatia around Zadar and the islands of Cres, Lošinj, and Lastovo. Italy entered World War I in a territorial gamble, mostly to gain Dalmatia. But Italy got only a small part of its pretensions, so Dalmatia mostly stayed Yugoslav.

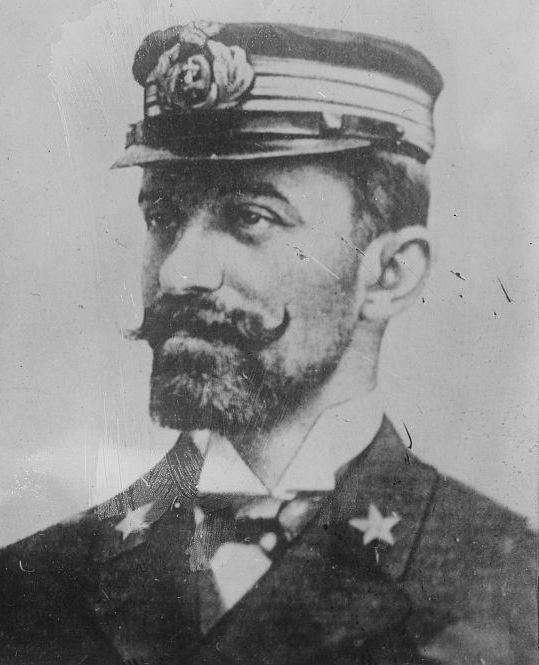
Enrico Millo, the first governor of the first Italian Governatorate of Dalmatia (1918–1920)

Despite the fact that there were only a few thousand Italian-speakers in Dalmatia after the constant decrease that occurred in previous decades, Italian irredentists continued to lay claim to all of Dalmatia. In 1927 Italy signed an agreement with the Croatian fascist, terrorist Ustaše organization. The Ustaše agreed that once they gained power, they will cede to Italy additional territory in Dalmatia and the Bay of Kotor, while renouncing all Croatian claims to Istria, Rijeka, Zadar and the Adriatic Islands.

In 1922, the territory of the former Kingdom of Dalmatia was divided into two provinces, the Oblast of Split and the Oblast of Dubrovnik. In 1929, the Littoral Banovina, a province of the Kingdom of Yugoslavia, was formed. Its capital was Split, and it included most of Dalmatia and parts of present-day Bosnia and Herzegovina. The southern parts of Dalmatia were in Zeta Banovina, from the Bay of Kotor to Pelješac peninsula including Dubrovnik. In 1939, Littoral Banovina was joined with Sava Banovina (and with smaller parts of other banovinas) to form a new province named the Banovina of Croatia. The same year, the ethnic Croatian areas of the Zeta Banovina from the Bay of Kotor to Pelješac, including Dubrovnik, were merged with a new Banovina of Croatia.

During World War II, in 1941, Nazi Germany, Fascist Italy, Hungary, and Bulgaria occupied Yugoslavia, redrawing their borders to include former parts of the Yugoslavian state. A new Nazi puppet state, the Independent State of Croatia (NDH), was created. With the Treaties of Rome, the NDH agreed to cede to Italy Dalmatian territory, creating the second Governorate of Dalmatia, from north of Zadar to south of Split, with inland areas, plus nearly all the Adriatic islands and Gorski Kotar. Italy then annexed these territories, while all the remainder of southern Croatia, including the entire coast, were placed under Italian occupation. Italy also appointed an Italian, Prince Aimone, Duke of Aosta, as king of Croatia.

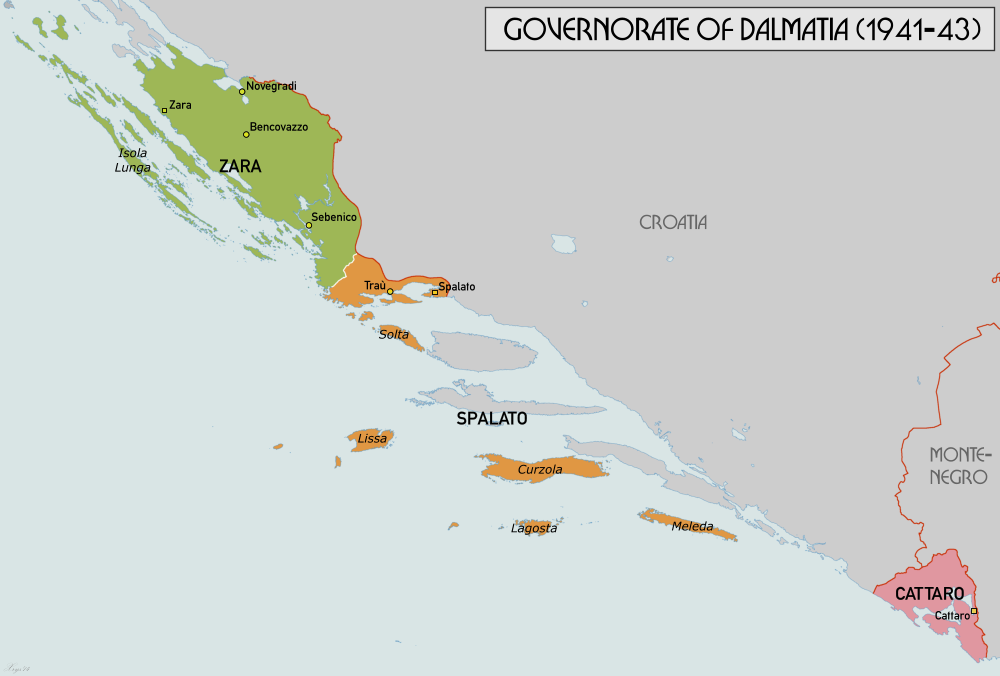
Map of the second Italian Governatorate of Dalmatia (1941–1943) showing the province of Zara, the province of Spalato and the province of Cattaro.

Italy proceeded to Italianize the annexed areas of Dalmatia. Place names were Italianized, and Italian was made the official language in all schools, churches and government administration. All Croatian cultural societies were banned, while Italians took control of all key mineral, industrial and business establishments. Italian policies prompted resistance by Dalmatians, many joined the Partisans. This led to further Italian repressive measures - shooting of civilian hostages, burning of villages, confiscation of properties. Italians took many civilians to concentration camps - altogether, some 80,000 Dalmatians, 12% of the population, passed through Italian concentration camps.

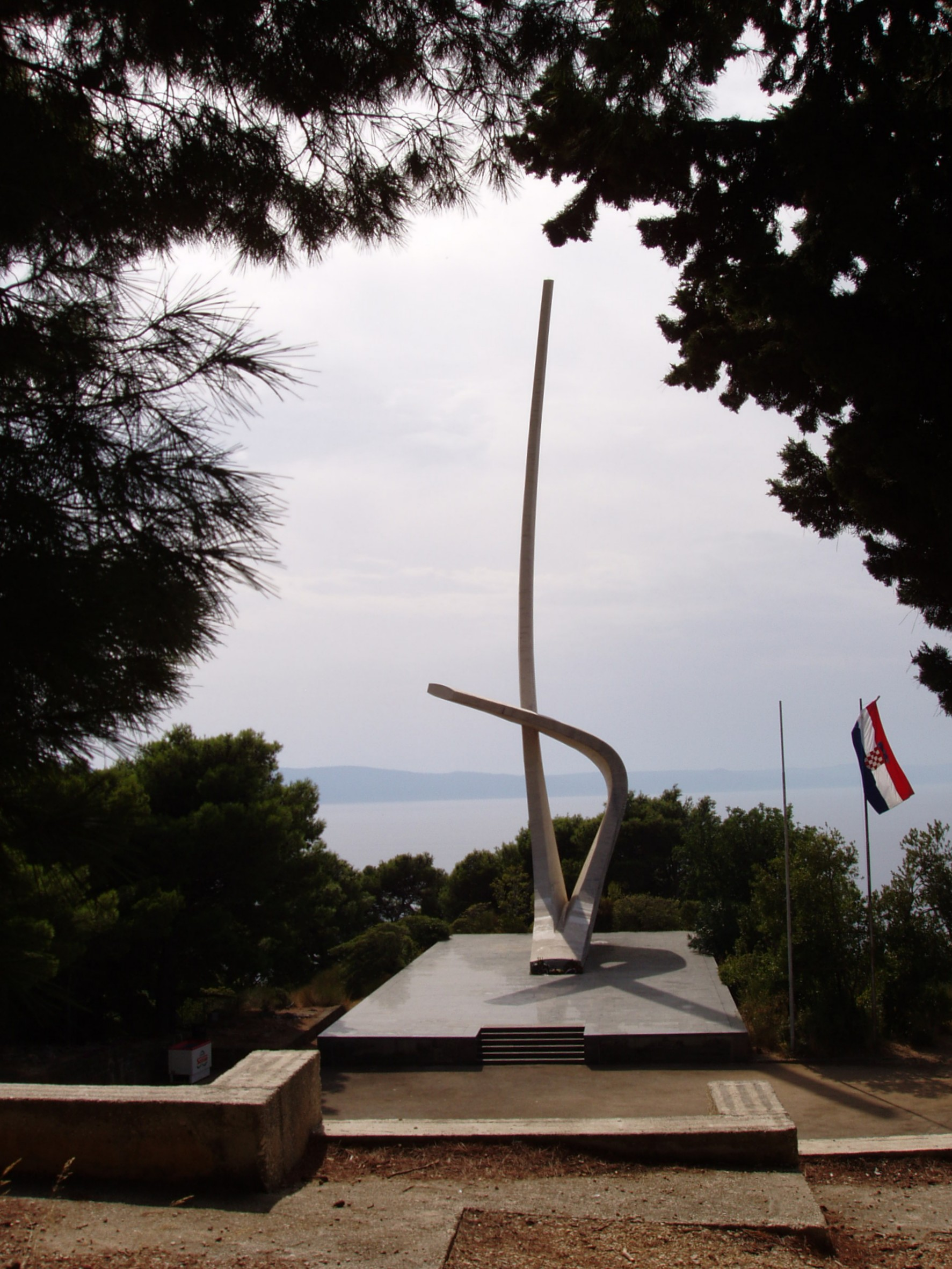
The Seagull Wings monument in Podgora, dedicated to the fallen sailors of the Yugoslav Partisan Navy

Many Croats moved from the Italian-occupied area and took refuge in the satellite state of Croatia, which became the battleground for a guerrilla war between the Axis and the Yugoslav Partisans. Following the surrender of Italy in 1943, much of Italian-controlled Dalmatia was liberated by the Partisans, then taken over by German forces in a brutal campaign, who then returned control to the puppet Independent State of Croatia. Vis Island remained in Partisan hands, while Zadar, Rijeka, Istria, Cres, Lošinj, Lastovo and Palagruža became part of the German Operationszone Adriatisches Küstenland. The Partisans took Dalmatia in 1944, and with that Zadar, Rijeka, Istria, Cres, Lošinj, Lastovo and Palagruža became reunited with Croatia. After 1945, most of the remaining Dalmatian Italians fled the region (350,000 Italians escaped from Istria and Dalmatia in the Istrian-Dalmatian exodus). After World War II, Dalmatia became part of the People's Republic of Croatia, part of the Federative People's Republic of Yugoslavia.

The territory of the former Kingdom of Dalmatia was divided between two federal republics of Yugoslavia and most of the territory went to Croatia, leaving only the Bay of Kotor to Montenegro. When Yugoslavia dissolved in 1991, those borders were retained and remain in force. During the Croatian War of Independence, most of Dalmatia was a battleground between the Government of Croatia and the Yugoslav People's Army (JNA), which aided the proto-state of Serbian Krajina, with much of the northern part of the region around Knin and the far south around, but not including, Dubrovnik being placed under the control of Serb forces. Croatia did regain the southern territories in 1992 but did not regain the north until Operation Storm in 1995. After the war, a number of towns and municipalities in the region were designated Areas of Special State Concern.

== Geography and climate ==
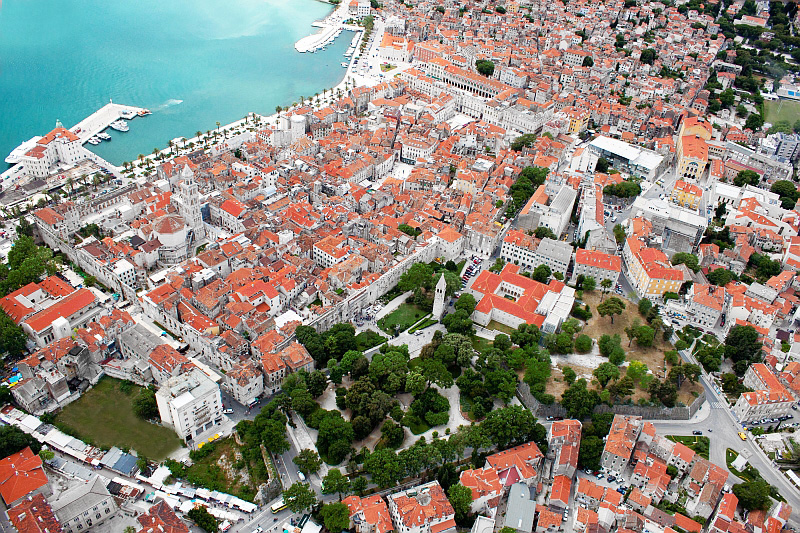
The ancient core of the city of Split, the largest city in Dalmatia, built in and around the Palace of Emperor Diocletian.

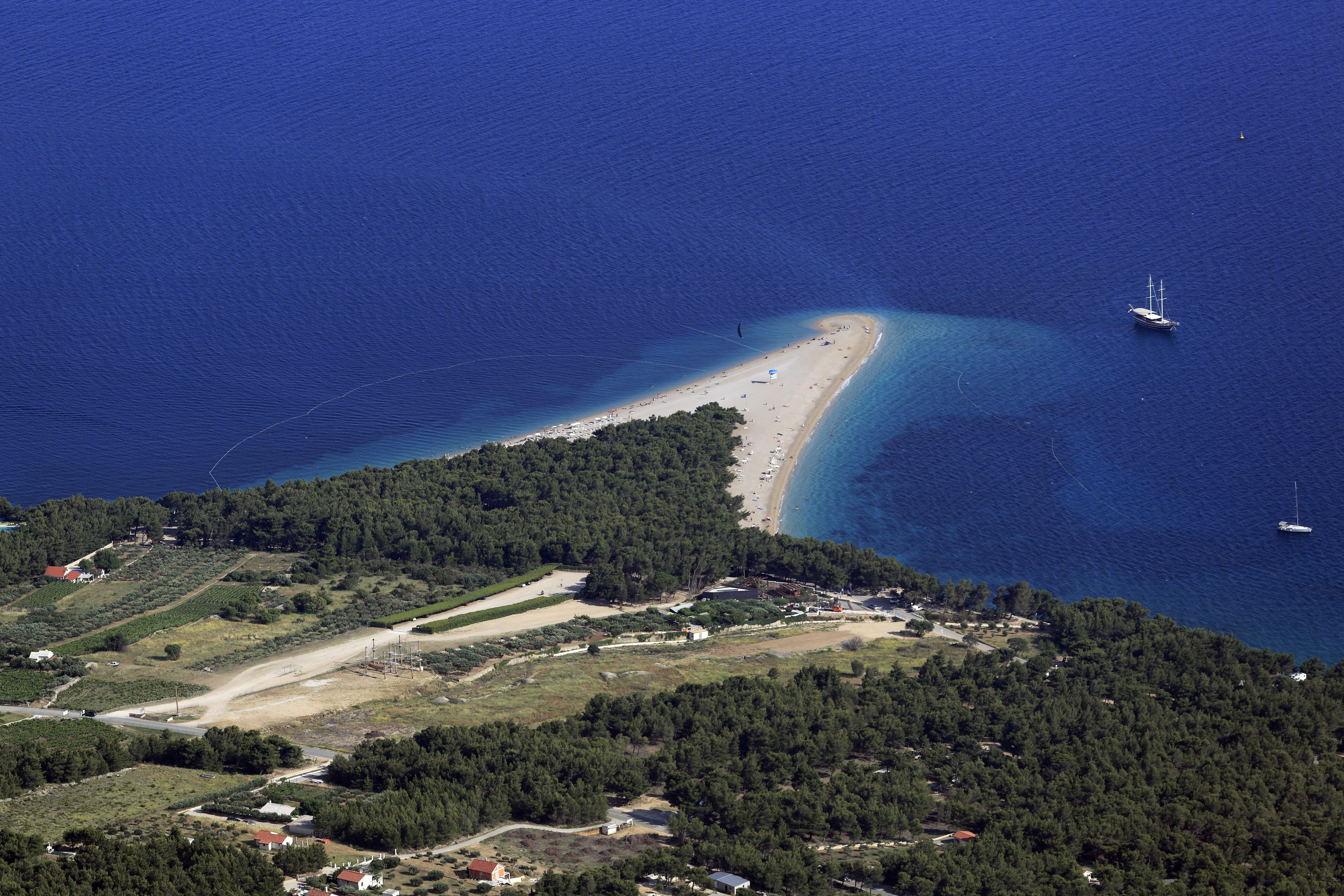
Zlatni Rat beach on Brač island (Croatia), in the Adriatic Sea, during the summer.

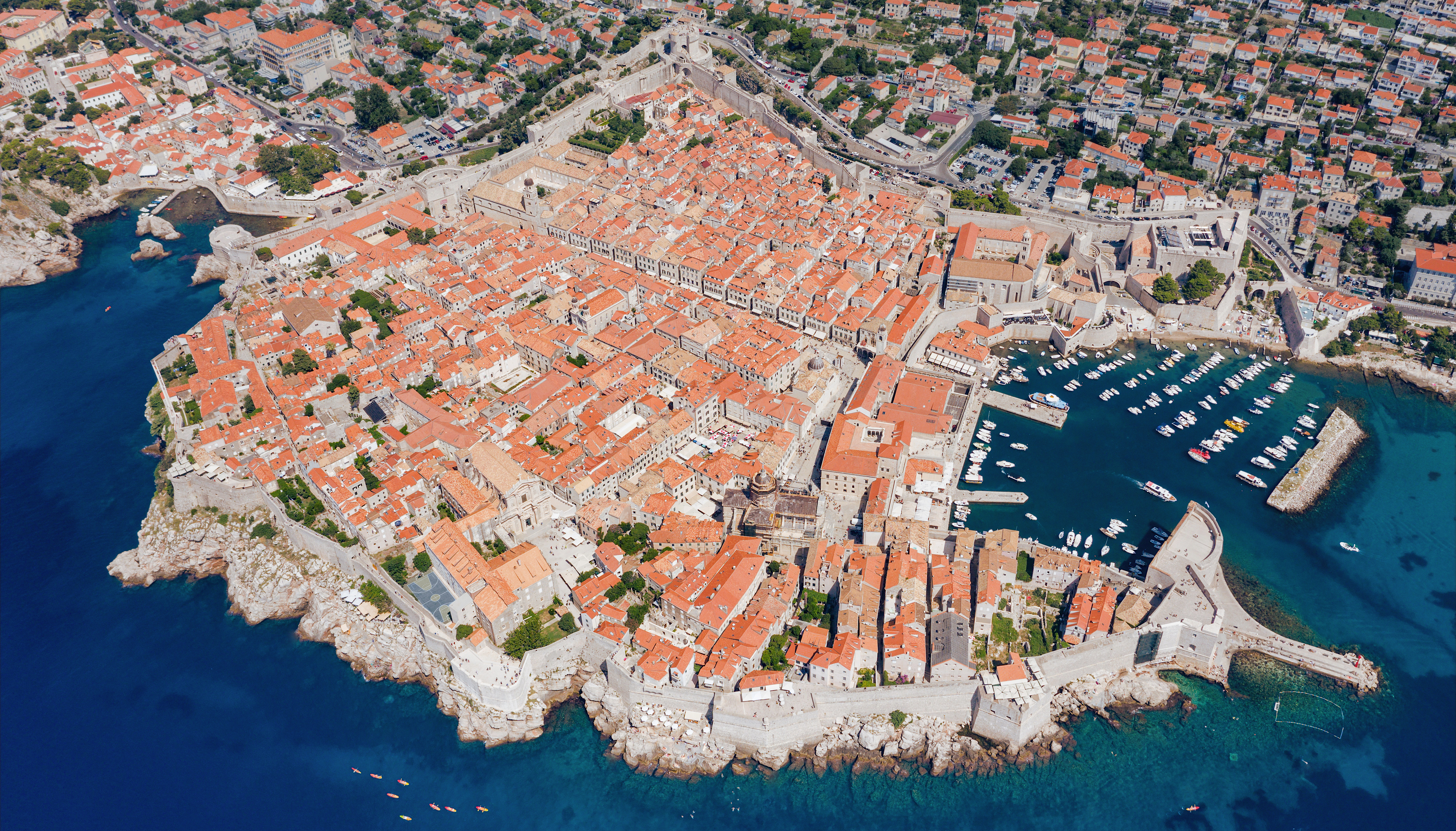
The historic core of the city of Dubrovnik, in southern Dalmatia.

Most of the land area is covered by the Dinaric Alps mountain range running from north-west to south-east. The hills and mountains lie parallel to the coast, which gave rise to the geographic term Dalmatian concordant coastline. On the coasts the climate is Mediterranean, while further inland it is moderate Mediterranean. In the mountains, winters are frosty and snowy, while summers are hot and dry. To the south winters are milder. Over the centuries many forests have been cut down and replaced with bush and brush. There is evergreen vegetation on the coast. The soils are generally poor, except on the plains where areas with natural grass, fertile soils, and warm summers provide an opportunity for tillage. Elsewhere, land cultivation is mostly unsuccessful because of the mountains, hot summers, and poor soils, although olives, grapes, and other Mediterranean flora flourish. Electricity is mainly produced by hydropower stations.

The largest Dalmatian mountains are Dinara, Mosor, Svilaja, Biokovo, Moseć, Veliki Kozjak, and Mali Kozjak. The regional geographical unit of Dalmatia–the coastal region between Istria and the Bay of Kotor–includes the Orjen mountains with the highest peak in Montenegro, 1894 m. In present-day Dalmatia, the highest peak is Dinara (1913 m), which is not a coastal mountain, while the highest coastal Dinaric mountains are on Biokovo (Sv. Jure, 1762 m) and Velebit (Vaganski vrh, 1757 m), although the Vaganski vrh itself is located in Lika-Senj County.

The largest Dalmatian islands are Brač, Korčula, Dugi Otok, Mljet, Vis, Hvar, Pag, Ugljan and Pašman. The major rivers are Zrmanja, Krka, Cetina, and Neretva.

The Adriatic Sea's high water quality, along with the immense number of coves, islands, and channels, makes Dalmatia an attractive place for nautical races, nautical tourism, and tourism in general. Dalmatia also includes several national parks that are tourist attractions: Paklenica karst river, Kornati archipelago, Krka river rapids, and the northwest of the island of Mljet.

== Administrative division ==
Historical population
Year	Pop.	±%
1857	377,776	—
1869	407,114	+7.8%
1880	436,455	+7.2%
1890	486,218	+11.4%
1900	550,080	+13.1%
1910	597,420	+8.6%
1921	616,285	+3.2%
1931	654,705	+6.2%
1948	669,815	+2.3%
1953	712,126	+6.3%
1961	761,407	+6.9%
1971	863,782	+13.4%
1981	910,452	+5.4%
1991	957,168	+5.1%
2001	857,559	−10.4%
2011	852,068	−0.6%
2021	803,930	−5.6%
Source: Croatian Bureau of Statistics publications^{2}

The area of Dalmatia roughly corresponds to Croatia's four southernmost counties, listed here north to south:

County	County seat	Population (Census 2011)	Ethnic Croats	Other ethnic Groups
Zadar County (Zadarska županija)	Zadar	170,017	157,389 (92.57%)	12,628 (7.34%): 8,184 Serbs (4.81%)
Šibenik-Knin County (Šibensko-kninska županija)	Šibenik	109,375	95,582 (87.39%)	13,793 (12.61%): 11,518 Serbs (10.53%)
Split-Dalmatia County (Splitsko-dalmatinska županija)	Split	454,798	441,526 (97.08%)	13.272 (2.92%): 4,797 Serbs (1.05%), 1,389 Bosniaks (0.31%) and 1,025 Albanians (0.23%)
Dubrovnik-Neretva County (Dubrovačko-neretvanska županija)	Dubrovnik	122,568	115,668 (94.37%)	6,900 (5.63%): 2,095 Serbs (1.71%) and 1,978 Bosniaks (1.61%)

== Cities by population ==
1. Split (161,312)
2. Zadar (70,829)
3. Šibenik (42,589)
4. Dubrovnik (41,671)

Other large towns include Biograd, Kaštela, Sinj, Solin, Omiš, Knin, Metković, Makarska, Trogir, Ploče, and Imotski.

== Culture and ethnicity ==
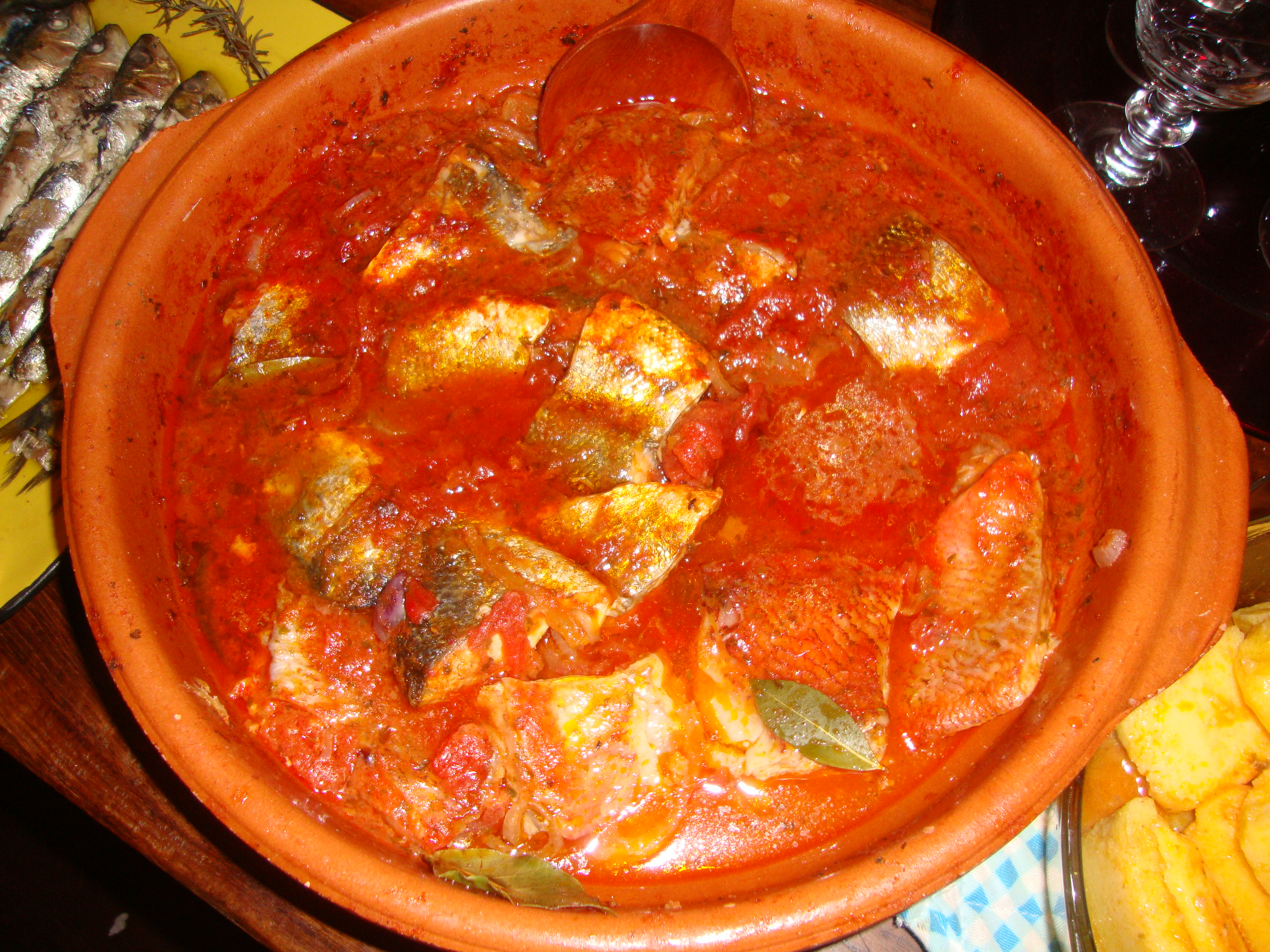
Brudet

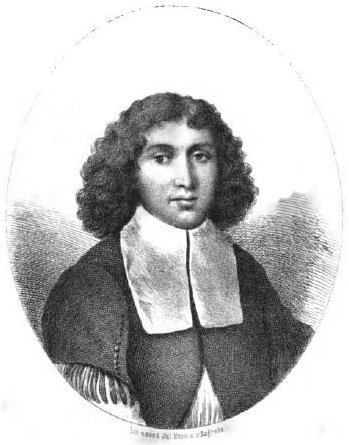
Girolamo Cavagnini, a Dalmatian poet who supported Dalmatianism

The inhabitants of Dalmatia are culturally subdivided into two groups. The urban families of the coastal cities, commonly known as Fetivi, are culturally akin to the inhabitants of the Dalmatian islands (known derogatorily as Boduli). The two are together distinct, in the Mediterranean aspects of their culture, from the more numerous inhabitants of the Hinterland. Referred to (sometimes derogatorily) as the Vlaji, their name originated from the Vlachs with whom they have no ethnic connection.

The former two groups (inhabitants of the islands and the cities) historically included many Venetian and Italian speakers, who are identificated as Dalmatian Italians. Their presence, relative to those identifying as Croats, decreased over the course of the 19th and the first half of the 20th century.

Dalmatian identity, or sometimes also Dalmatianism, Dalmatianness or Dalmatian nationalism', refers to the historical nationalism or patriotism of Dalmatians and Dalmatian culture. There were significant Dalmatian nationalists in the 19th century, but Dalmatian regional nationalism faded in significance over time in favour of ethnic nationalism.

The 17th-century Dalmatian poet Jerolim Kavanjin (Girolamo Cavagnini) exhibited Dalmatianism, identifying himself as "Dalmatian" and calling Dalmatia his homeland, which John Fine interprets not to have been a nationalist notion.

During Dalmatia's incorporation in Austrian Empire, with the Autonomist Party in Dalmatia refusing and opposed plans to incorporate Dalmatia into Croatia; instead it supported an autonomous Dalmatia based on a multicultural association of Dalmatia's ethnic communities: Croats, Serbs, and Italians, united as Dalmatians. The Autonomist Party has been accused of secretly having been a pro-Italian movement due to their defense of the rights of ethnic Italians in Dalmatia. Support for the autonomy of Dalmatia had deep historic roots in identifying Dalmatian culture as linking Western culture via Venetian and Italian influence and Eastern culture via South Slavic influence; such a view was supported by Dalmatian autonomist Stipan Ivičević. The Autonomist Party did not claim to be an Italian movement, and indicated that it sympathised with a sense of heterogeneity amongst Dalmatians in opposition to ethnic nationalism. In the 1861 elections, the Autonomists won twenty-seven seats in Dalmatia, while Dalmatia's Croatian nationalist movement, the People's Party, won only fourteen seats.

The issue of autonomy of Dalmatia was debated after the creation of Yugoslavia in 1918, due to divisions within Dalmatia over proposals of merging the region with the territories composing the former Kingdom of Croatia-Slavonia. Proposals for the autonomy of Dalmatia within Yugoslavia were made by Dalmatians within the Yugoslav Partisans during World War II; however, these proposals were strongly opposed by Croatian Communists and the proposals were soon abandoned.

== Gallery ==
Places in Dalmatia
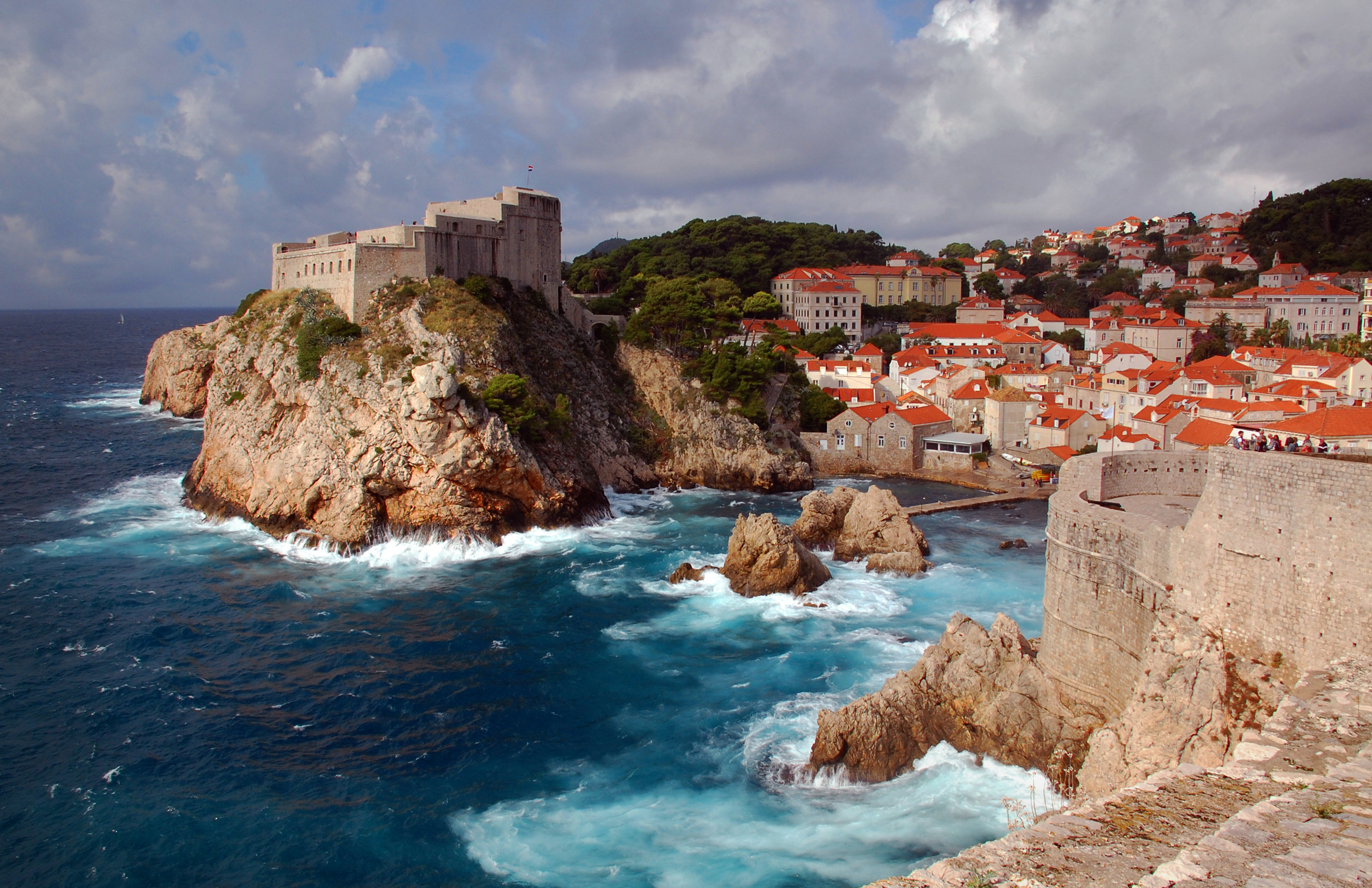
Medieval fortresses of Lovrijenac & Bokar, in Dubrovnik

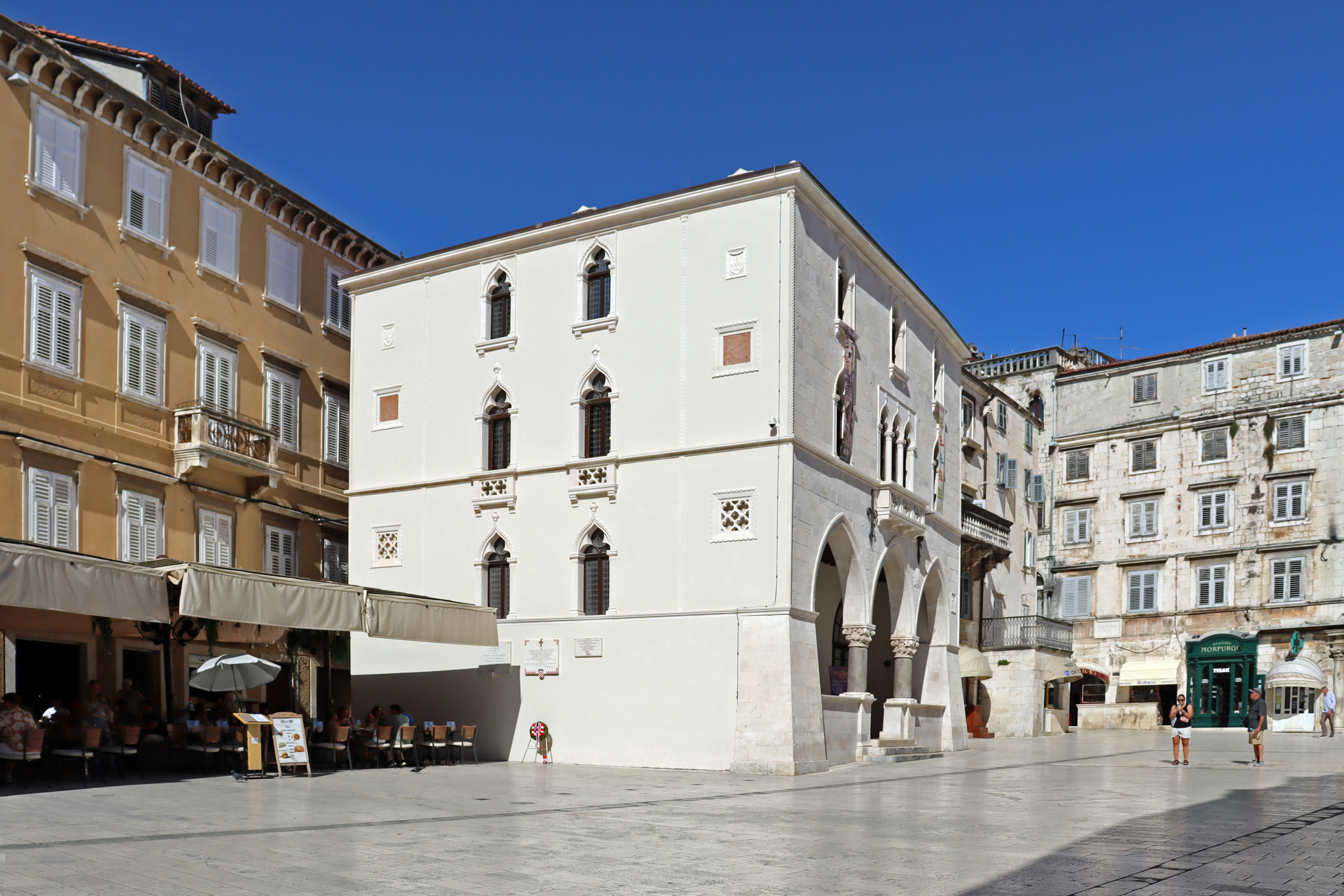
The Pjaca city square in Split

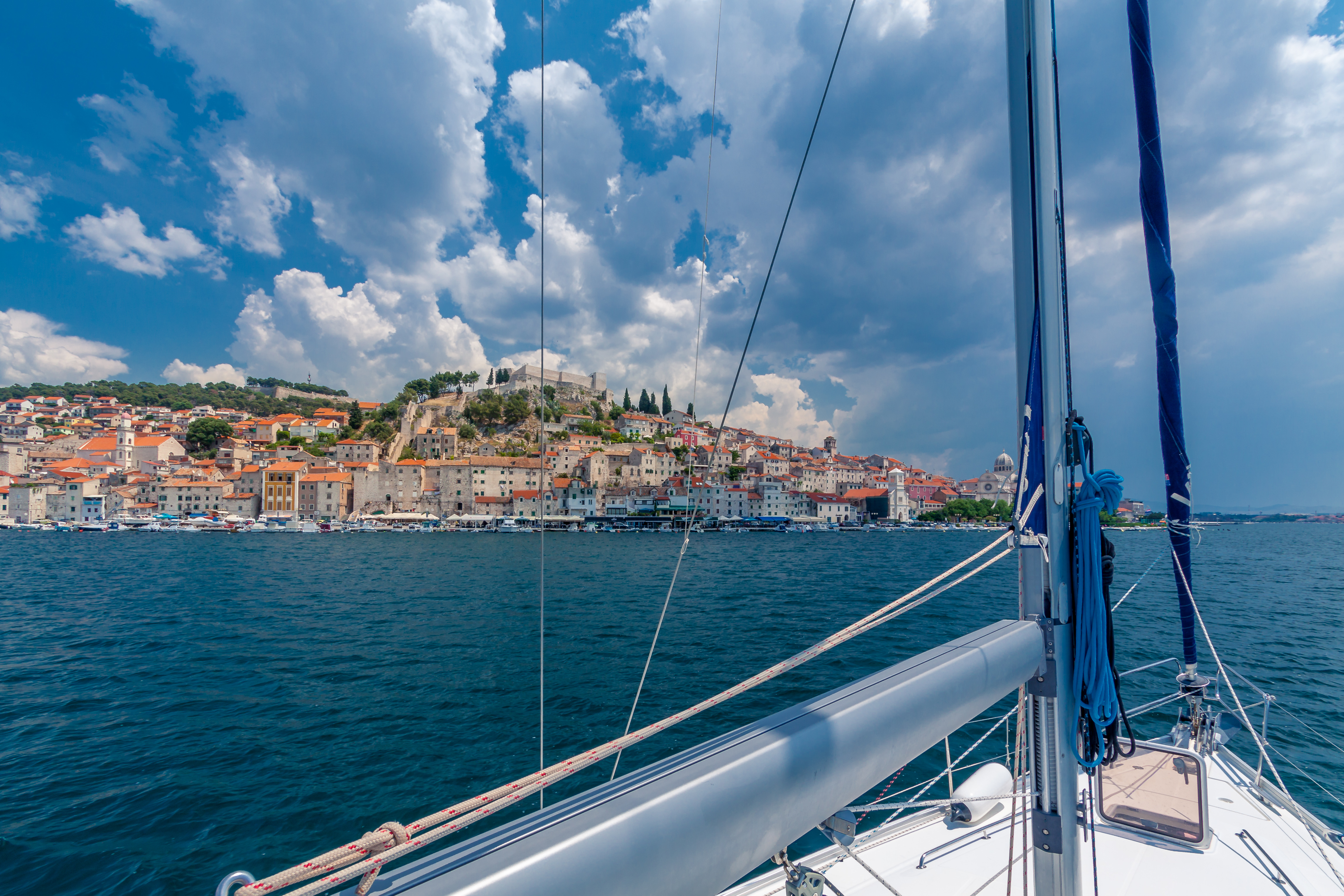
Panoramic view of Šibenik’s waterfront

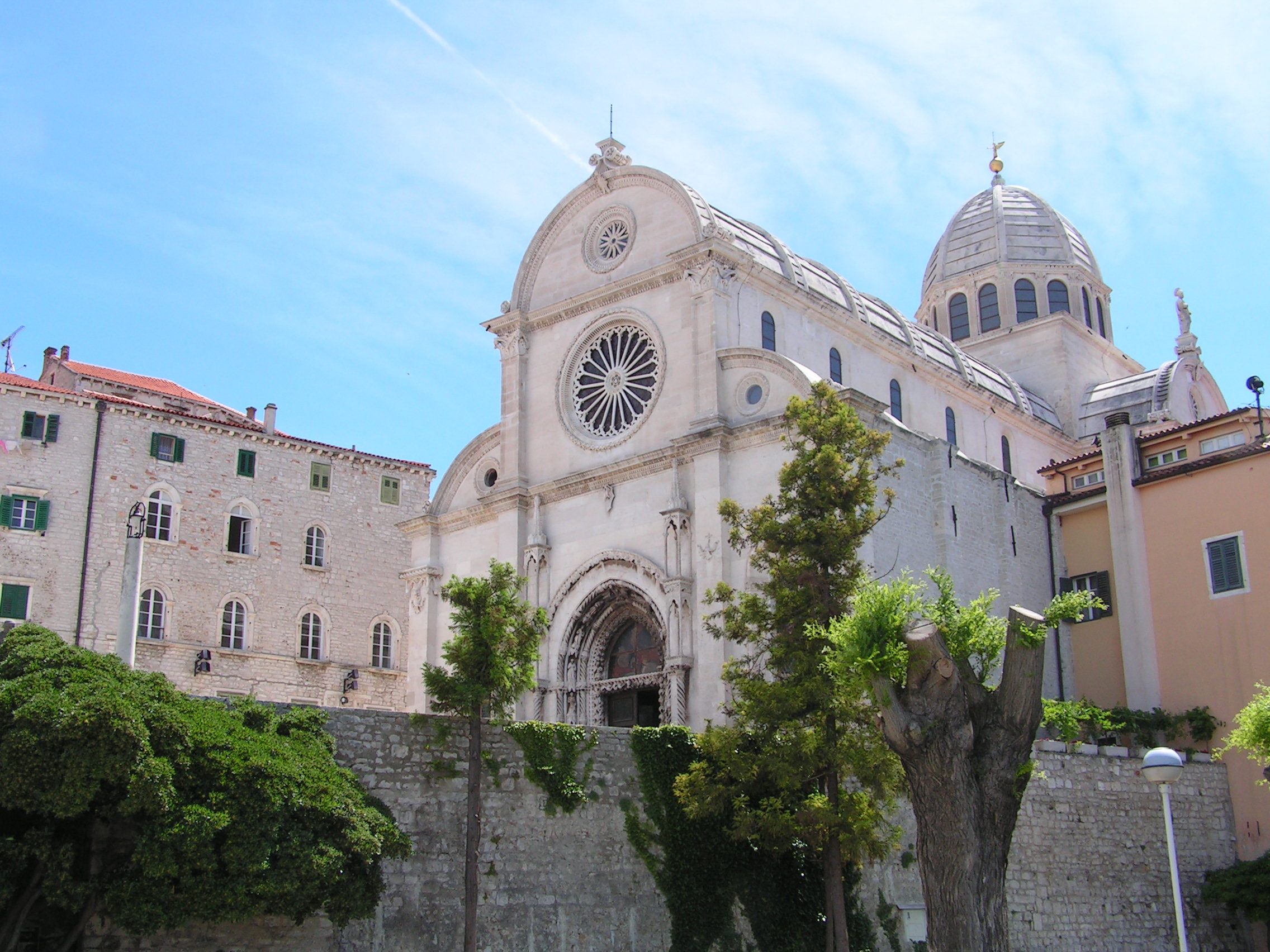
Šibenik Cathedral

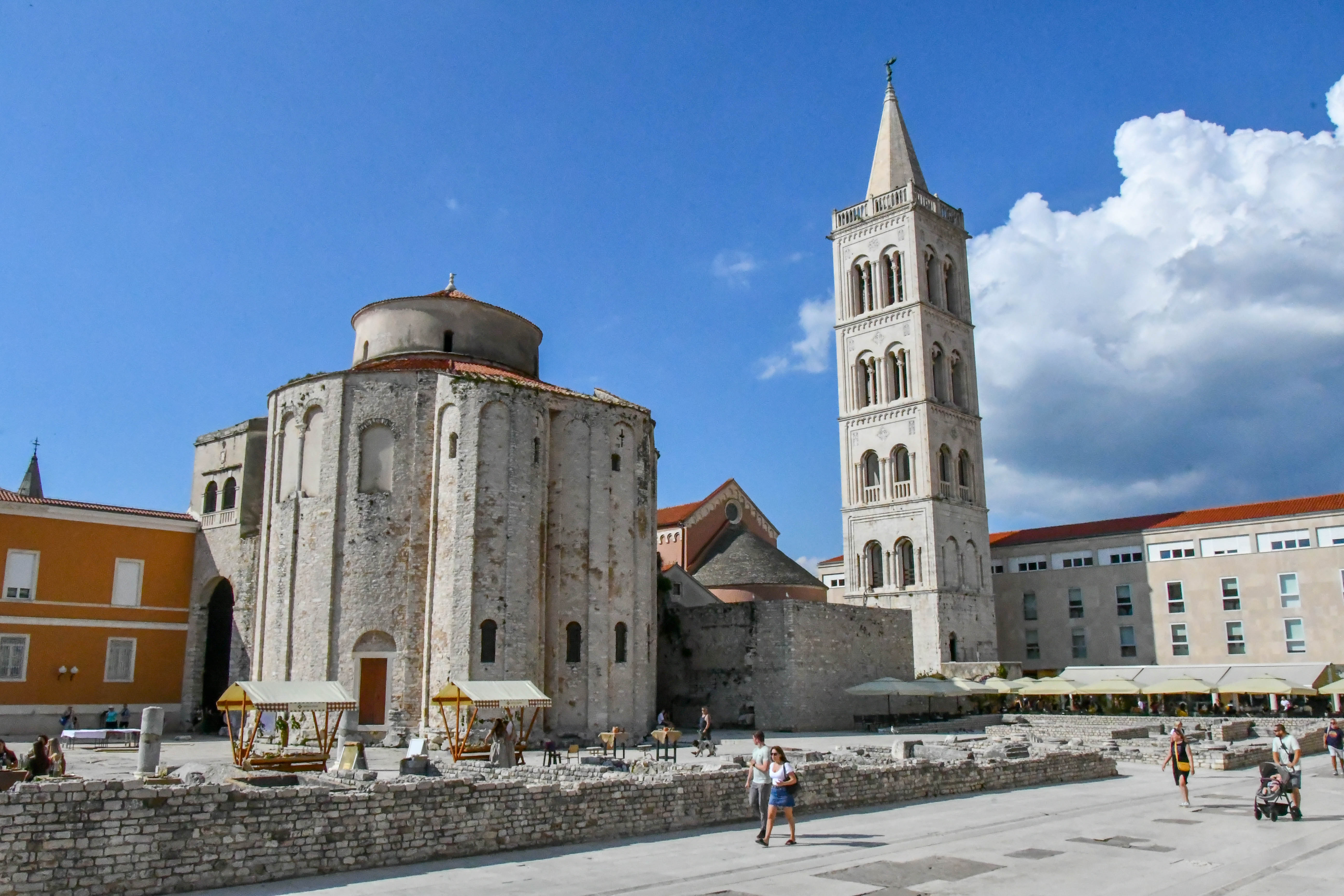
Church of St. Donatus in Zadar

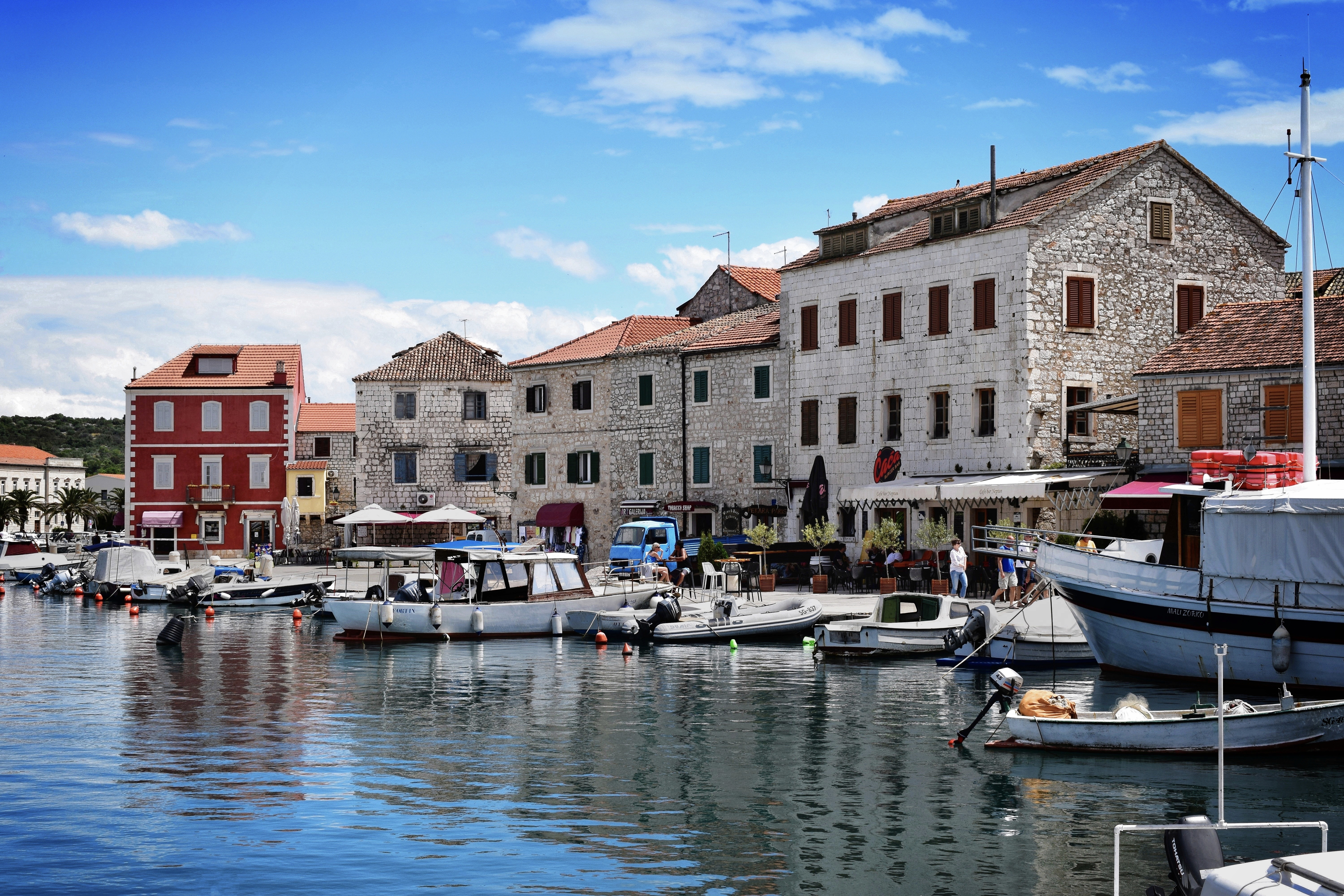
Hvar

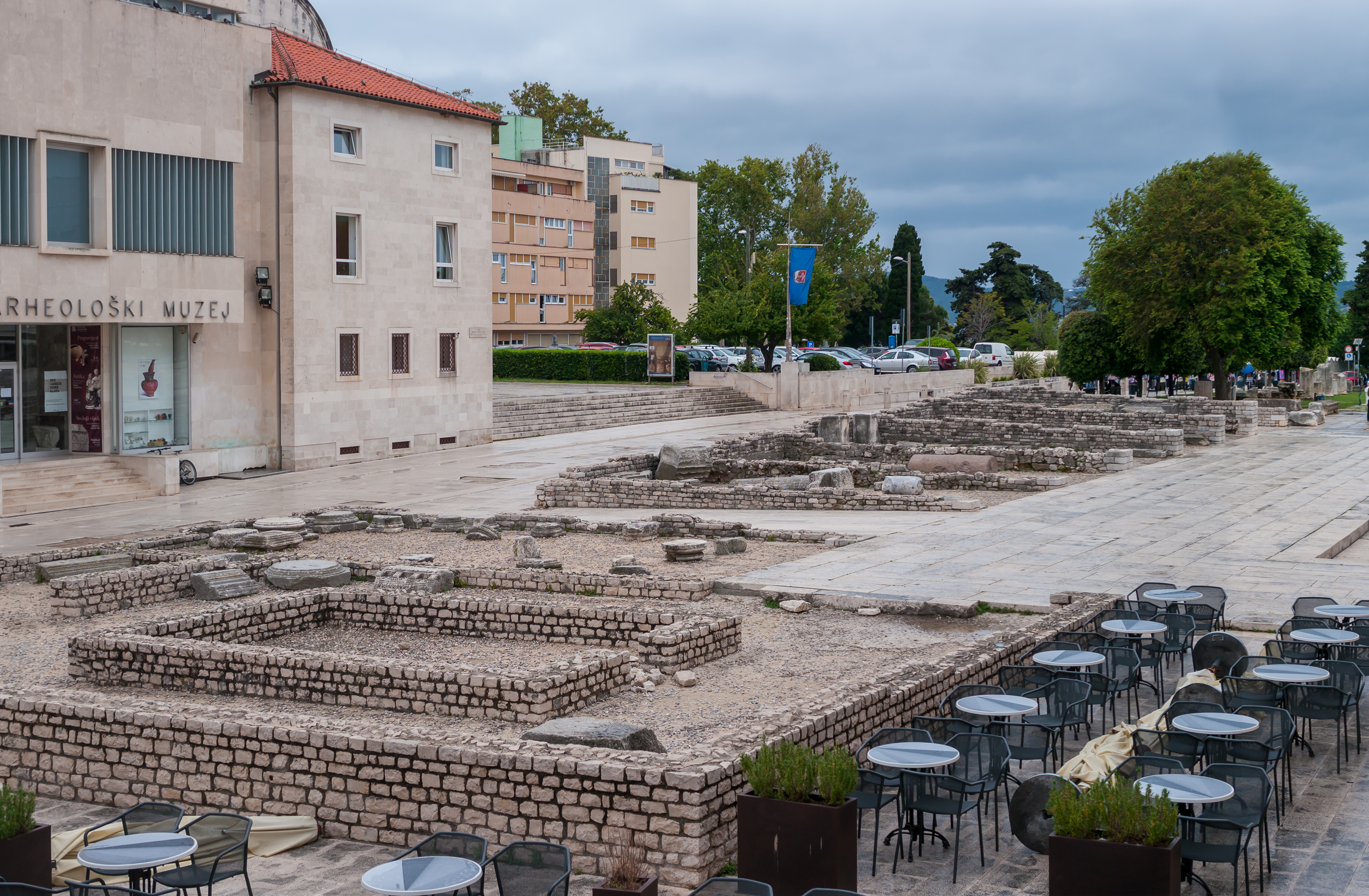
The ancient Roman forum in Zadar

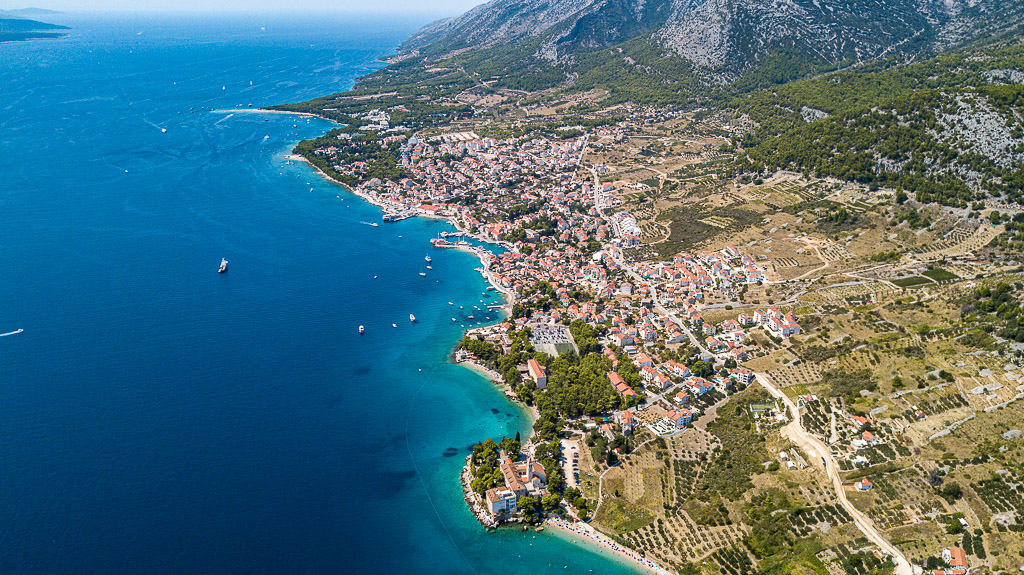
Panoramic view of Bol

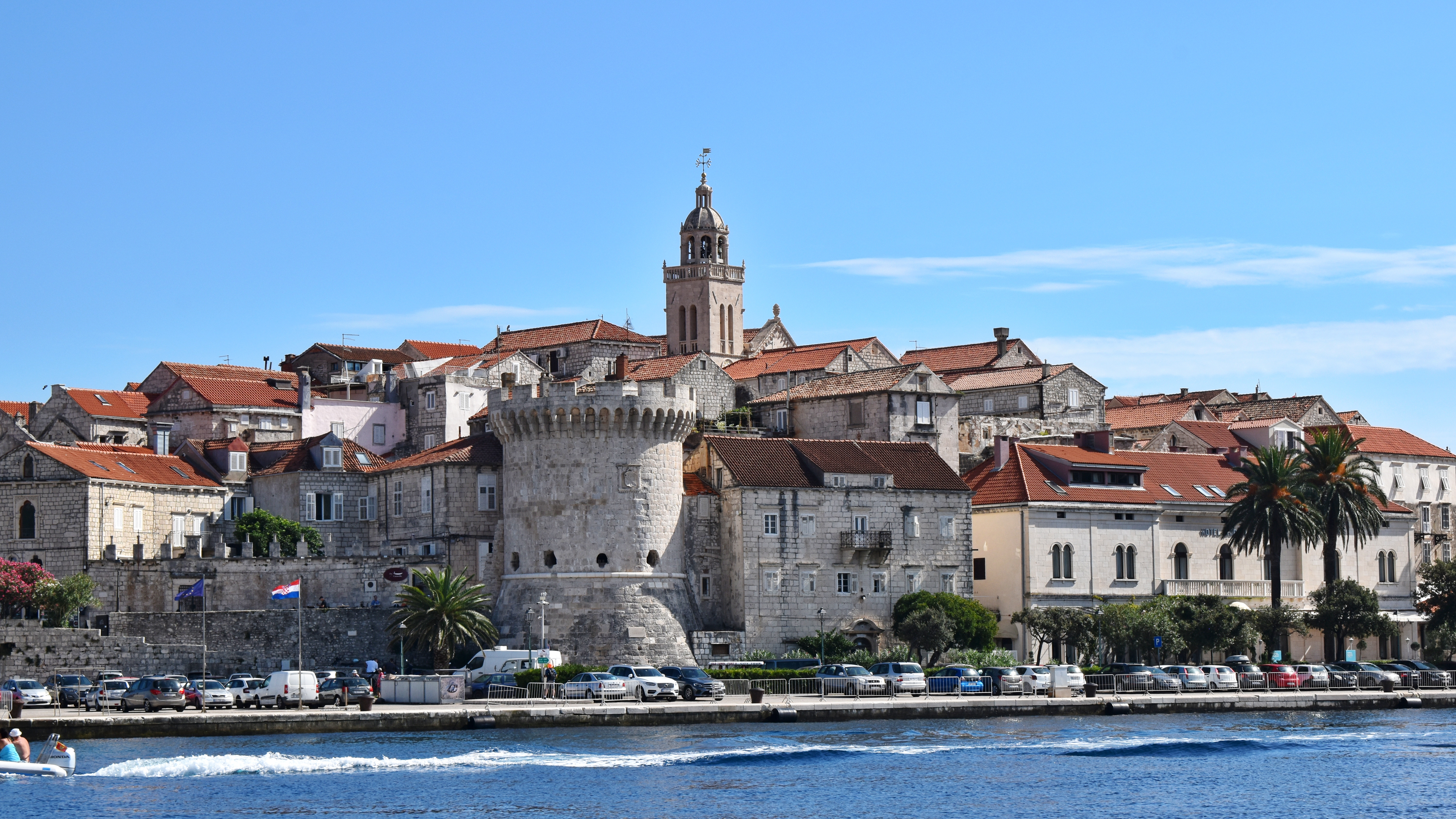
Korčula

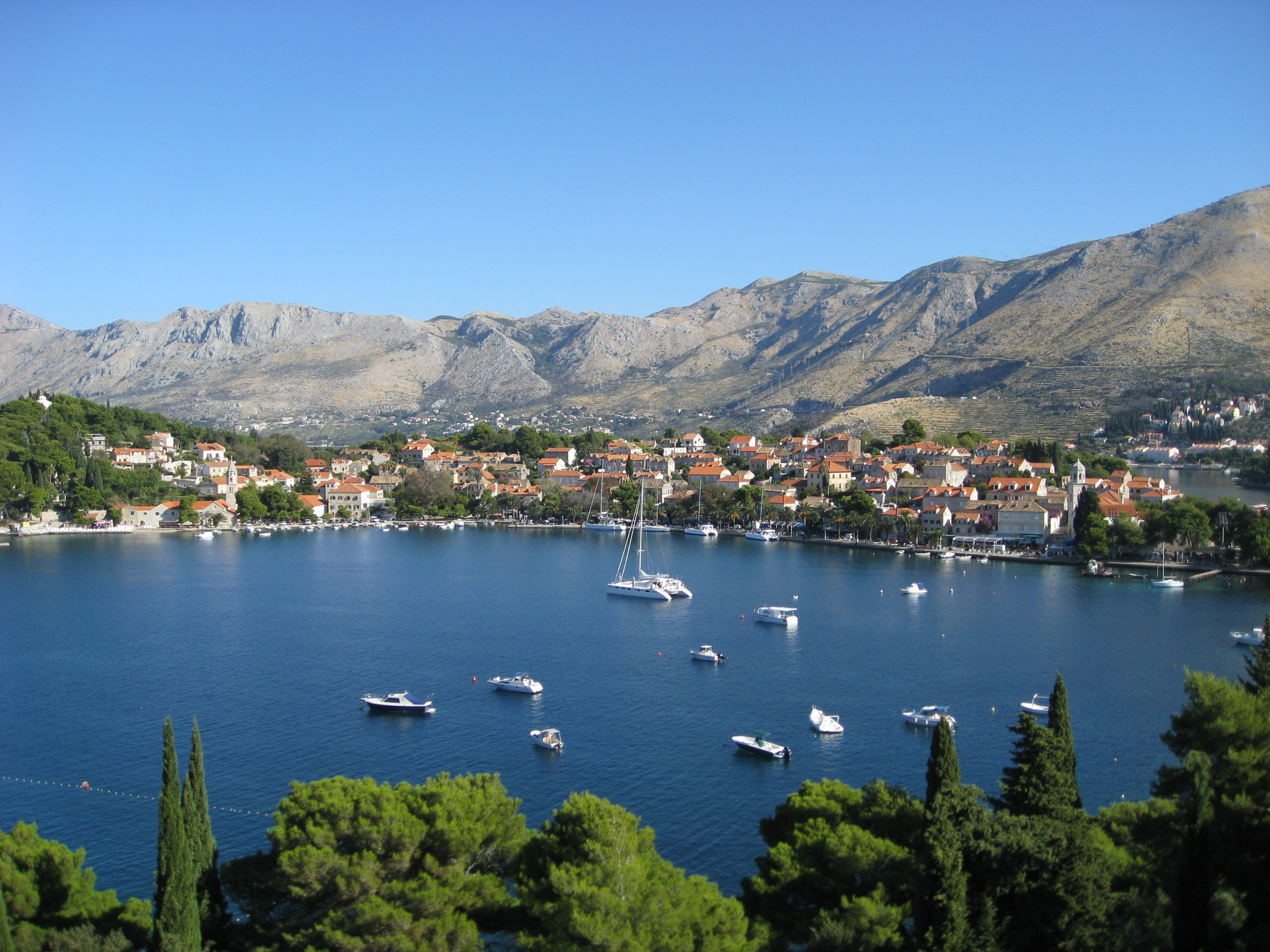
Panoramic view of Cavtat

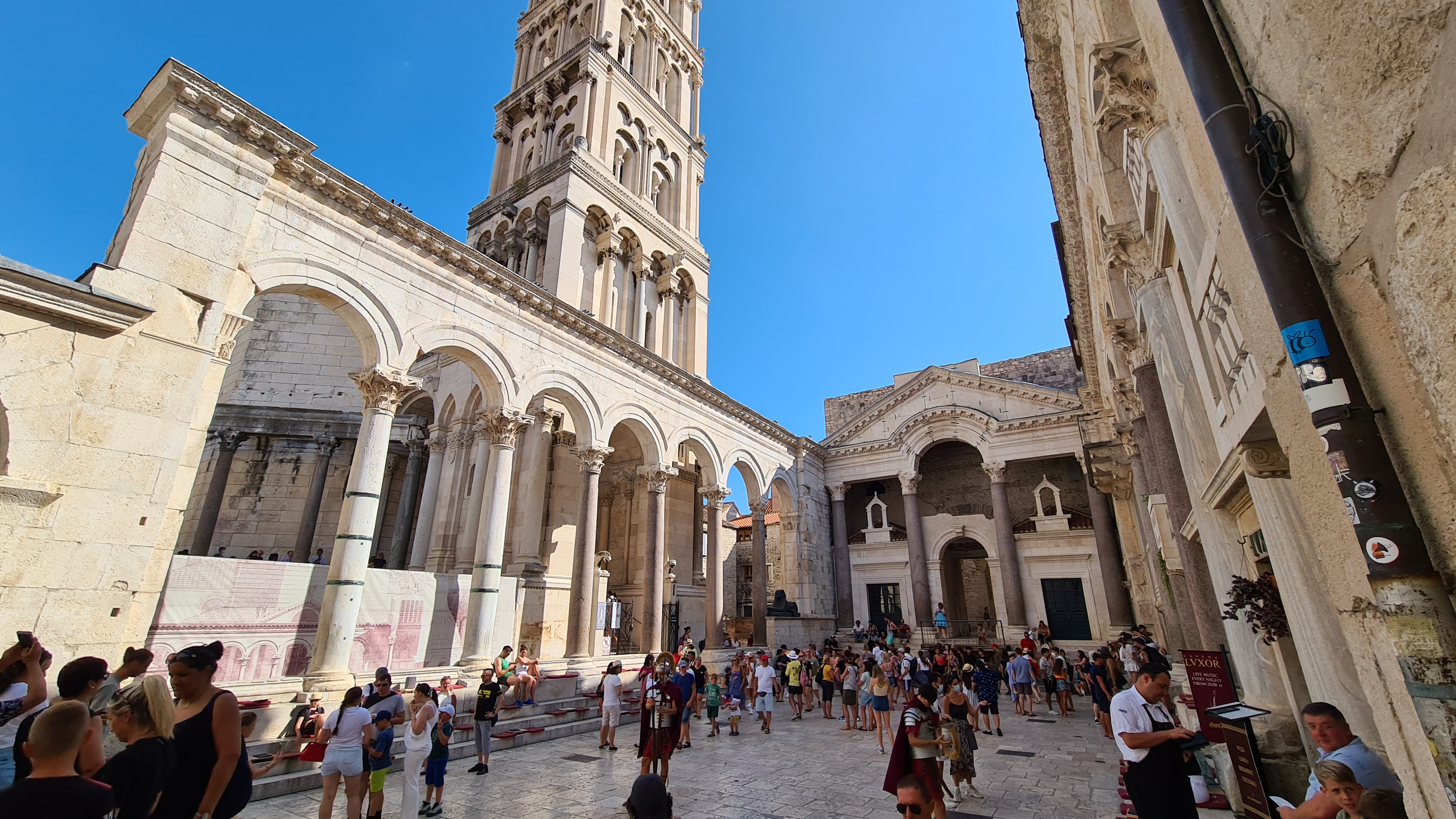
Diocletian's Palace

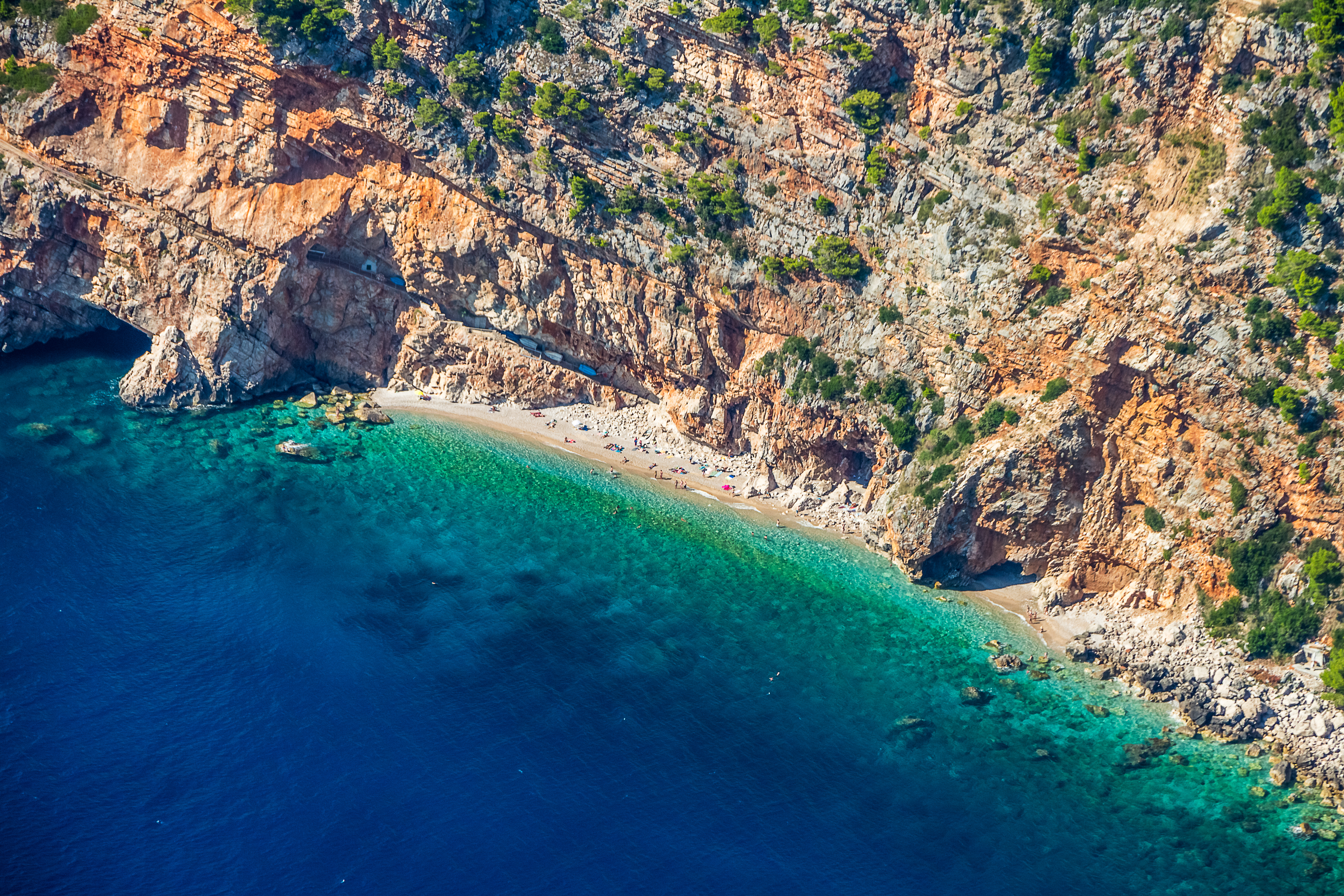
Hidden beach in southern Dalmatia

== See also ==
- History of Dalmatia
- Venetian Dalmatia
- Dalmatian (dog)—notable dog breed originating in the region
- Chakavian – South Slavic supradialect or language
- Liburnia – Ancient region in modern Croatia

== Bibliography ==
- Ivetic, Egidio (2022). Povijest Jadrana: More i njegove civilizacije [History of the Adriatic: A Sea and Its Civilization] (in Croatian and English). Srednja Europa, Polity Press. ISBN 9789538281747.
- Seton-Watson, Christopher (1967). Italy from Liberalism to Fascism, 1870–1925. Methuen & Co. ISBN 978-0-416-18940-7.
- Tomasevich, Jozo (October 2002). War and Revolution in Yugoslavia, 1941-1945: Occupation and Collaboration. Stanford University Press. ISBN 978-0-8047-7924-1. Archived from the original on 17 March 2025.
