= Battle of Brest (1596) =

1596 battle during the Ottoman–Croatian Wars

- Part of the Ottoman wars in Europe; Ottoman–Croatian Wars
Date	19 September 1596
Location	Brest, Kingdom of Croatia, Habsburg monarchy
Result	Habsburg monarchy victory
Territorial changes	The Ottomans abandoned the siege of Petrinja

Belligerents
Ottoman Empire	Habsburg Monarchy: Kingdom of Croatia

Commanders and leaders
Hafiz Ahmed Pasha of Vidin	Croatian ban Ivan Drašković; Colonel Juraj Lenković; Colonel Johan Herberstein

Strength
7,000–8,000 soldiers	5,000–6,000 soldiers

Casualties and losses
Unknown	Unknown

The Battle of Brest (1596) (Croatian: Bitka kod Bresta) was fought on September 19, 1596 between the Ottoman forces of Achmed Hafis Pasha, Beylerbey of Vidin, and the Germanic and Croatian forces led by Ivan Drašković, Ban of Croatia. The battle was a part of the Croatian–Ottoman wars and Ottoman–Habsburg wars between the Ottoman Empire and the Habsburg monarchy.

== Prelude ==
Location of Brest in modern Croatia.

Brest is a village near Petrinja, on the left bank of the Kupa river. In 1562, a small fortress (lat. castellum) was built there in order to defend against frequent Ottoman raids. In 1592, Hasan Pasha Predojević built the fortress of Petrinja nearby, and defeated a joint Styrian-Croatian army gathered to oppose him in the battle of Brest. After their victory, the Ottomans sacked and burned the fortress of Brest and raided Turopolje region.

== Battle ==
Forces of Ahmed Hafis Pasha, Beylerbey of Vidin, reinforced by troops of Bosnian Beylerbey Hodaberdi, besieged Petrinja on September 10, 1596. In response, by September 19, 5,000 - 6,000 Christian troops gathered on the left bank of the Kupa river, under Croatian ban Ivan Drašković, colonel Juraj Lenković, and Johan Herberstein of the Military Frontier.

Judging their forces too few to cross the Kupa against the Ottoman defenders, they moved towards Sisak in order to cross the river there and move on to lift the siege of Petrinja. Movement of Croatian troops was interpreted as a retreat by the Ottomans, so the Bosnian beylerbey crossed the river with a cavalry force in order to pursue the enemy. In response, Croatian troops quickly turned back and scattered the pursuers after a short skirmish, forcing them into the Kupa river.

== Aftermath ==
This skirmish broke the morale of the Ottoman army besieging Petrinja, who lifted the siege on the same day and started a retreat.

== Bibliography ==
- Vojna enciklopedija (1970–76), 10 volumes, Vojno izdavački zavod Beograd, book 2, p. 8, article Brest (in Serbo-Croatian)
