= Battle of Brest =

Numerous actions have been termed the Battle of Brest, Brest being the name of two important fortress towns in France and Belarus, respectively, and two small towns, one in Croatia, and the other in North Macedonia.

== Brest, Croatia ==
- The Battle of Brest (1592), part of the Hundred Years' Croatian–Ottoman War
- The Battle of Brest (1596), part of the Hundred Years' Croatian–Ottoman War and the Long War (1591–1606)

== Brest, France ==
- The Siege of Brest (1342) - a siege of the Hundred Years' War.
- The Siege of Brest (1386) - a siege of the Hundred Years' War.
- The Battle of Saint-Mathieu - a naval battle off the port during the War of the League of Cambrai in 1512, often called the battle of Brest.
- The Attack on Brest - a failed attack in 1694 by the English to destroy the harbor of Brest during the War of the Grand Alliance
- Various naval actions of the eighteenth century, including those sometimes termed the First, Second or Third Battles of Ushant are occasionally termed the battle of Brest.
- The Battle for Brest - A land battle between American and German forces over possession of the port in 1944.

== Brest, Belarus ==
- The Battle of Brest (1655) during the Russo-Polish War (1654–67)
- The Battle of Brest (1792) during the Polish-Russian War of 1792
- The Battle of Brest (1794), also known as the Battle of Terespol, during the Kosciuszko Uprising.
- The Battle of Brześć Litewski also called the Battle of Brest-Litovsk was an action between the Poles and the Germans in September 1939.
- The Battle of Brest (1941) or Defense of Brest Fortress took place on 22 June - 30 June 1941
- In July 1944 the town was taken by the Soviets during the Lublin–Brest Offensive.

== Brest, Macedonia ==
- Brest attack - NLA attack on the Macedonian police in the village of Brest during the 2001 insurgency in Macedonia
