= Andreas von Auersperg =

Carniolan noble and military commander (1556–1593)

Andreas von Auersperg, Lord of Schönberg und Seisenberg (Slovene: Andrej Turjaški; Croatian: Andrija Auersperg) (9 April 1556 – 5 September 1593) was a Carniolan noble from the influential Auersperg family, leader of the defending forces at the Battle of Sisak in 1593.

== Life and career ==
Andreas von Auersperg was born in the Carniolan town of Žužemberk (Seisenberg) into one of the leading Protestant Austrian families in the Duchy of Carniola as the youngest son of Wolfgang-Engelbert von Auersperg, Lord of Schönberg, Seisenberg and Flödnig, and Anna Maria von Lamberg. After his parents' early demise, the governor of Carniola, Baron Weikhard von Auersperg (1533–1581), became the guardian of the one-year-old boy.

In 1569, the 13-year-old registered at the University of Tübingen, where the Collegiate Church, along with the rest of the city, was one of the first to have converted to Martin Luther's teachings. In 1573 and 1574, he also studied at the renowned universities of Padua and Bologna.

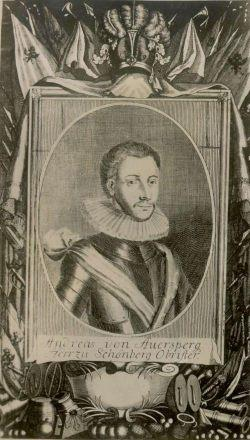
Andreas von Auersperg Herr zu Schönberg, Obrister

Andreas became a soldier accompanying Archduke Matthew on his campaign in the Netherlands (1577–1578), fighting as a captain on the Croatian-Turkish border in 1578 and 1579 under Hans Ferenberger von Auer and Christoph von Auersperg. In 1583 he rose to the rank of colonel and was appointed commander-in-chief (Feldobrist) of the Croatian and Dalmatian frontier lands in Karlstadt in 1589.

== Battle of Sisak ==
On 22 June 1593, the day of Saint Acacius, the leader of the Ten thousand martyrs, a battle occurred near the fortress of Sisak in present-day Croatia, where the Sava and Kupa rivers meet. It was the last fortress the Ottomans needed to conquer in order to expand northward into central Europe virtually unopposed.

Sources report that the Ottoman army attacking the fortress was 38,000 strong, commanded by the Bosnian beylerbey (governor-general), Hasan Pasha (born Niko Predojević). The Carniolan army under the command of the Ban of Croatia, Tamás Erdődy, which was defending the fort counted only 4,000 to 5,000 men led by Andreas von Auersperg and Ruprecht von Eggenberg and reinforced by 1,240 Croatian horsemen and 500 Silesian mounted riflemen. Hasan Pasha attacked with his main force but was repelled by the heavy fire of the defending army. The Turks then retreated to the bridge they had just crossed, but Auersperg sent the arquebusars to capture the bridge. The Ottomans were then forced to swim to the other side of the river. About 8,000 Ottomans died during the retreat, including Hasan Pasha, who drowned in the river. The remaining Ottomans (who were guarding the camp) set their gunpowder on fire and fled. Thus, Auersperg won the Battle of Sisak and saved central Europe from imminent Ottoman invasion, whereupon Pope Clement VIII sent the Protestant—who was nicknamed the "Carniolan Achilles" or even the "Christian Achill(es)" and called "the Terror of the Turks"—a handwritten letter of congratulation.

Andreas von Auersperg died unmarried in Karlovac three months later.
