= Telli Hasan Pasha =

Ottoman general (1530–1593)

Hasan Predojević
- Hasan Predojević
- Born: Nikola Predojević c. 1530 either Lušci Palanka, Sanjak of Bosnia; or Bijela Rudina, Sanjak of Herzegovina, Ottoman Empire
- Died: 22 June 1593 (aged 63); Sisak, Kingdom of Croatia, Habsburg Monarchy
- Military career
- Allegiance: Ottoman Empire; Eyalet of Bosnia
- Service years: –1593
- Rank: Beylerbey of Bosnia Eyalet, Vizier
- Conflicts: Siege of Bihać (1592); Siege of Senj (1592); Battle of Brest (1592); Battle of Sisak (1593)

Hasan Predojević (c. 1530 – 22 June 1593), also known as Telli Hasan Pasha (Turkish: Telli Hasan Paşa), was the fifth Ottoman beylerbey (vali) of Bosnia and a notable Ottoman Bosnian military commander, who led an invasion of Croatia during the Ottoman wars in Europe. From July to October 1592, he led devastating raids into Slavonia, Bohemia, Croatia, and Hungary resulting in the capture of 35,000 people and the enslavement and death of more than 20,000 people.

== Early life ==
He was born Nikola Predojević into the Predojević clan of Serb ethnic background in medieval Bosnia and Herzegovina from East Herzegovina. According to Muvekkit Hadžihuseinović he was born in Lušci Palanka, in the Bosanska Krajina region, however, according to his nickname Hersekli, he was from Herzegovina. The birthplace has been given specifically as Bijela Rudina, Bileća. His family originated from Klobuk.

An Ottoman sultan wrote in a book that he had requested from a notable lord in Herzegovina, named Predojević, that 30 small Serb children (including Predojević's only son Jovan, and his nephew Nikola) to be sent to Ottoman service (see devshirme). The very young Nikola was then taken to Constantinople as acem-i oğlan (foreign child) and brought up in the Sultan's court, and was forced to convert to Islam, adopting the name Hasan and advancing to the post of çakircibaşa (chief falconer and commander of falconers in the Sultan's court).

After having been appointed Beglerbeg of Bosnia, Telli Hasan Pasha had the Rmanj Monastery renewed as a seat of his brother, Serbian Orthodox monk Gavrilo Predojević. He also founded a mosque in the town of Bileća.

== Ottoman service ==
=== Sanjak-bey of Segedin ===
During the rule of Murad III (1574–1595) he became Sanjak-bey of the Sanjak of Segedin, where he stayed until June 1591.

=== Beylerbey of Bosnia ===
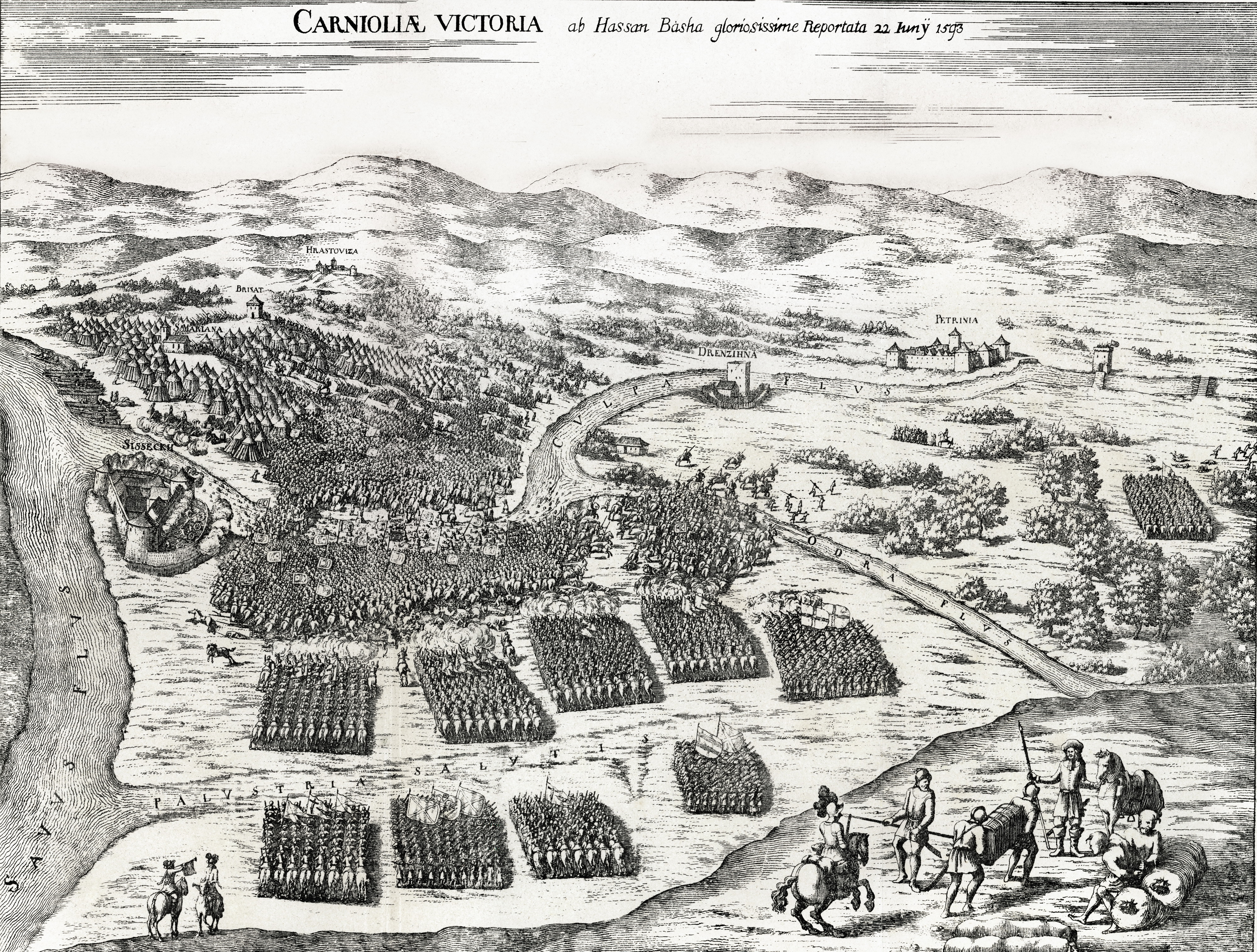
Hasan-paša Predojević led the Ottoman army from the Bosnia Eyalet into the Battle of Sisak in 1593.

He was elevated and appointed Beglerbeg (Governor-General) of the Bosnia Eyalet in 1591. A bellicose and dynamic military leader, Hasan strengthened the army of the Eyalet equipping it with better horses and erecting a bridge at Gradiška with the purpose of easier maneuvering between Bosnia and Slavonia.

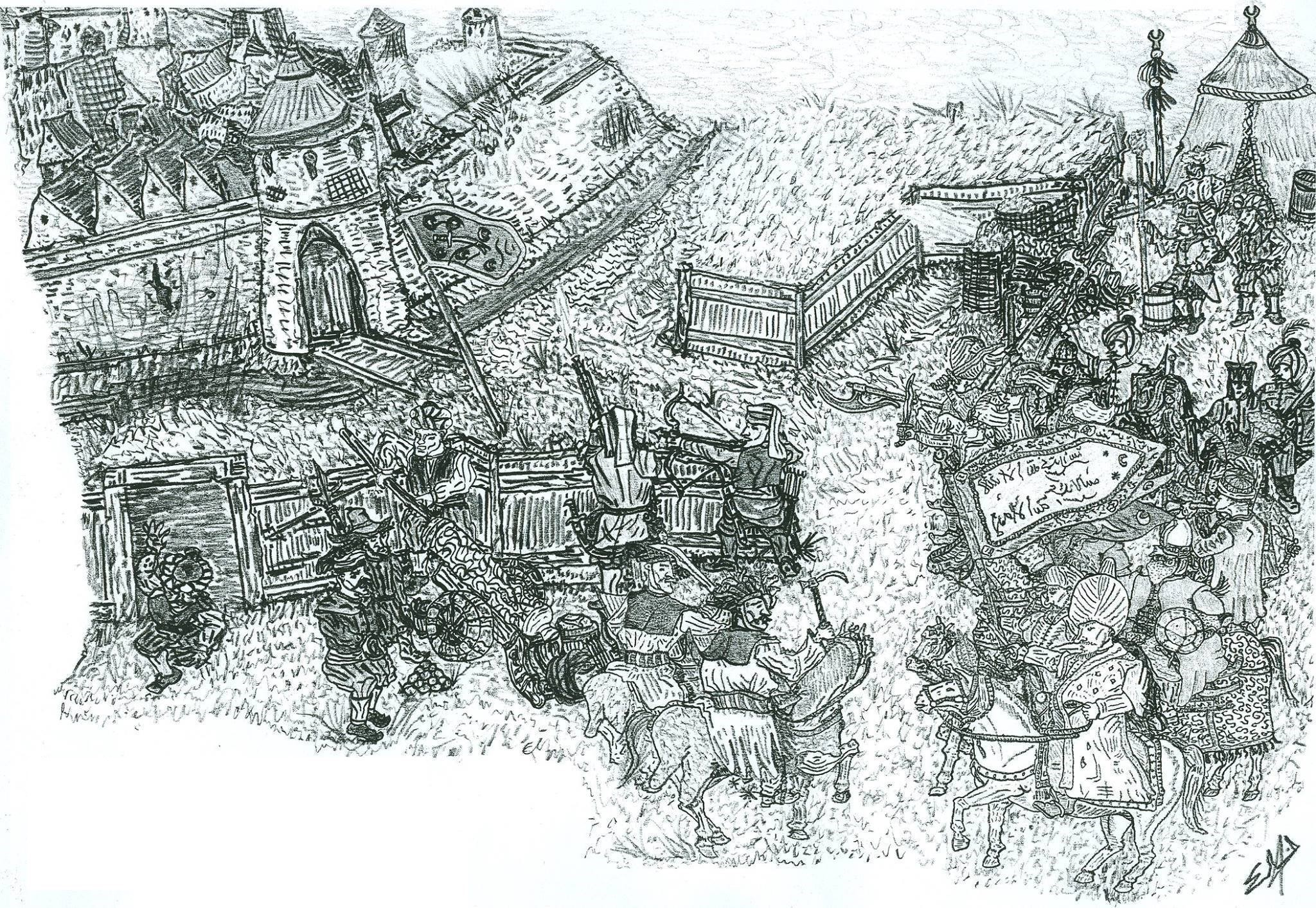
Anonymous modern representation of the successful assault on the Habsburg Croatian fortified town of Bihać by the Ejalet-i Bosna Ottoman provincial forces led by Gazi Hasan-paša Predojević, in 1592.

In August 1591, without a declaration of war, Hasan Pasha attacked Habsburg Croatia and reached Sisak, but was repelled after 4 days of fighting. Thomas Erdődy, the Ban of Croatia, launched a counterattack and seized much of the Moslavina region. The same year Hasan Pasha launched another attack, taking the town of Ripač on the Una River. These raids forced the Ban to declare a general uprising to defend the country in late January 1592. These actions of the Ottoman regional forces under Hasan Pasha seem to have been contrary to the interest and policy of the central Ottoman administration in Constantinople, and due rather to aims of conquest and organized plundering by the war-like Bosnian sipahi, although perhaps also under the pretext of putting an end to Uskok (Balkan Habsburg-sided pirates and bandits engaged in guerrilla warfare against the Ottomans) raids into the Eyalet; since the two realms had signed a nine-year peace treaty earlier in 1590. Hasan Pasha's forces of approximately 20,000 janissaries continued to raid the region, with the goal of seizing the strategically important town of Senj and its port, and to eliminate the Uskoci; because all of this, the Holy Roman Emperor sent his ambassador so he would beg that Hasan Pasha be removed from his post, or otherwise an end would be put to the existing truce. The ambassador was told in reply, that it belonged to the Grand Vizier and to Derviš-paša, the Sultan's favourite, to repel their aggressions against the Ottoman Empire; that, the imperial ambassador was told, was a sufficient answer. After learning this, Hasan Pasha felt himself encouraged enough to lead his forces towards Bihać, which was conquered on 19 June 1592 after eight days of siege, along with several surrounding forts. Records show that nearly 2,000 people died in defense of the town, and an estimated 800 children were taken for Ottoman servitude (see devshirme), to be educated in Islam and become janissaries, as Hasan had been himself. After having placed a sufficient garrison in Bihać, he erected two other fortresses in its vicinity; the command of which he conferred to Rustem-beg, who was the leader of the Grand Vizier Ferhad Pasha's militia. In all, during this two-year campaign, the Ottoman Bosnian regional invading forces, led by Hasan Pasha, burned to the ground 26 cities throughout the Croatian Frontier and took some 35,000 war captives. At the same time, at Predojević's order, Orthodox Serbs were settled in the "whole region around Bihać" from 1592 to 1593. Predojevic fully relied on Vlachs, recruiting them specially for his army; according to an official report, in 1593, after the fall of Bihać, Vlachs were, at Hasan's order, settled in the areas around Brekovica, Ripač, Ostrvica, and Vrla Draga up to Sokolac, while Orthodox Vlachs from Eastern Herzegovina, and with them some Turkish and Bosnian Muslim aristocratic feudal landlords as well, were settled in the same areas, in such numbers that they formed a significant population of this region.

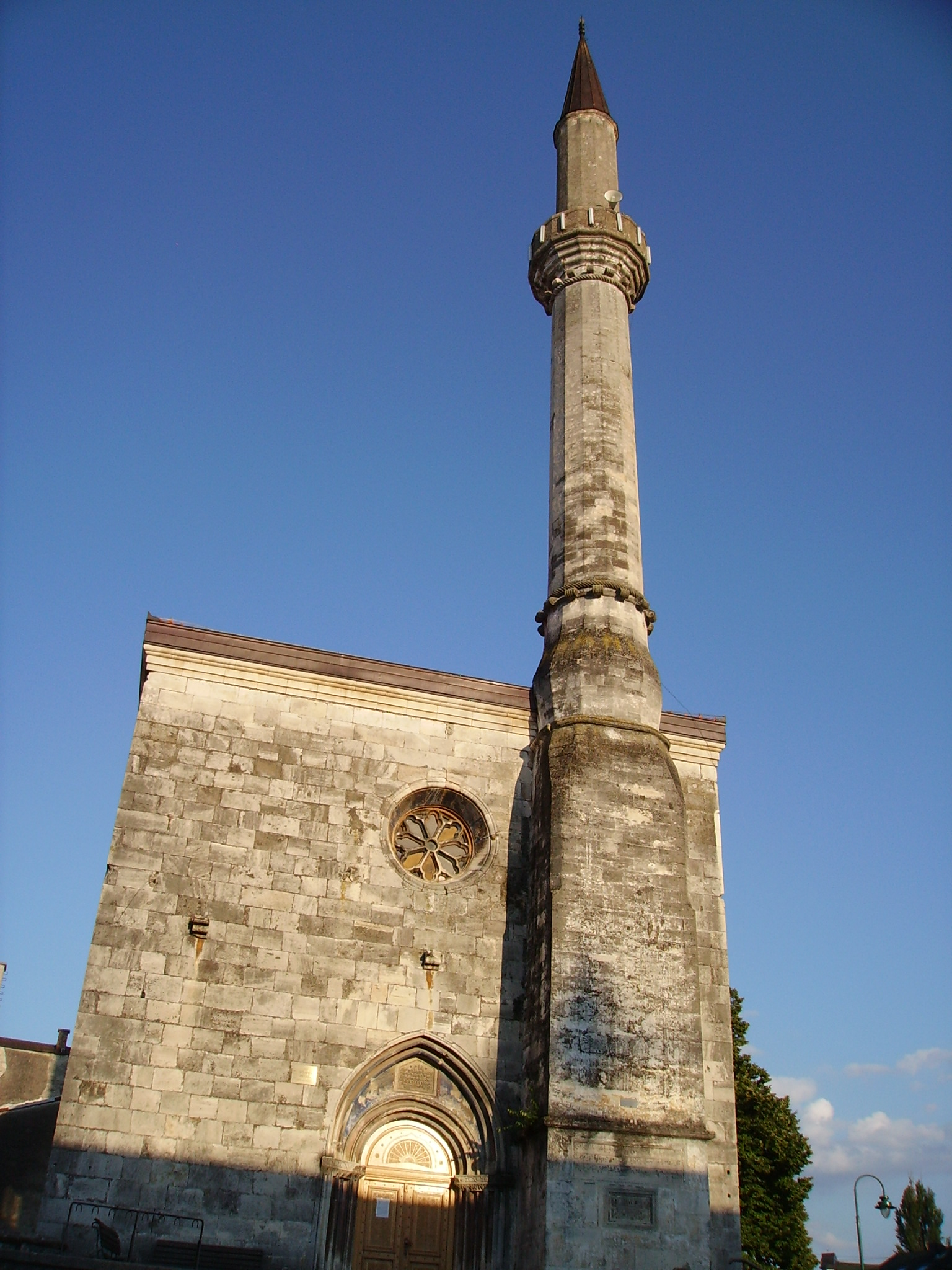
Fethija, a mosque in Bihać, formerly a Roman Catholic church. After the fall of the city to the Ottoman army, and its conversion into capital of its own Sanjak, the old main Roman Catholic church was converted into a mosque and renamed Fethija ("conquered")

At first, Telli Hasan Pasha's troops met little resistance, allowing them to capture numerous Uskoci settlements, where they enslaved or slaughtered the entire population and burned the settlements. His forces soon besieged and captured Senj and exterminated the Uskoci population. For his successes, the Pasha was awarded the title of "Vizier" by the Sultan. However, the following year, Telli Hasan Pasha decided to advance further into Croatia. His force of some twenty-thousand was soundly defeated in his third attempt to conquer Sisak, in the battle that took place near by that fortified town, in which Hasan Pasha is generally reported to have died, alongside his brother Džafer Bey (governor of the Sanjak of Pakrac-Cernica), Mehmed Pasha (the sultan's nephew and governor of the Sanjak of Herzegovina), Arpadi Bey (governor of the Sanjak of Klis-Livno), and many other Turkish and Bosnian Muslim Pashas, Beys and Aghas, who accompanied the Vizier in his campaign, having been routed. According to Mustafa Naima: "The brave Hasan Pasha himself also met with his fate, having fallen into the river with one of the bridges which had been cut to prevent the pursuit of the enemy. Such was the result of this terrible day." Indeed, after he had drowned in the river, his dress was taken as a trophy to Ljubljana where it was remade into the sacerdotal coat worn by the bishop during the celebration of the Thanksgiving mass.

== Aftermath and legacy ==
A monastery was built on the location of his grave, after requests of a Predojević to Sultan Murad, who also granted Kolunić and Smiljan (metochion). Safvet-beg Bašagić praises him as a meritorious general and statesman, as well as a great and fearless hero.

== Annotations ==
1. His birth name was Nikola Predojević. Chroniclers and historians call him by various names, such as (in Serbo-Croatian): "Gazi Hasan-paša", "Hasan-paša Došen" (this is the name Evliya Çelebi calls him by), "Predojević", "Klobučarić", "Hersekli", "Deli Hasan-paša" and "Derviš Hasan-paša".
2. As it is reported in the Turali-beg's Vakufname of 1562, some great Turkish and Bosnian Muslim landholding military nobles (Sipahi and Timarli) brought with them Orthodox Vlach population from the Sandžak of Smederevo into Bosnia, in order that they farmed their lands. The Turks often profited greatly from Vlach experience in carrying goods and the skill and speed with which they crossed the mountain regions. For that very reason, aside of serving as auxiliary soldiers in the Ottoman military (see Martolos and Vlach), they always accompanied the Ottoman armies in their expeditions throughout the Balkans, up to the North-West, in whole communities; being intended for populating the newly conquered territories as border military colonies, called katun or džemaat (which were composed of about 20 to 50 houses); at the head of which there was a katunar or primikur ("headman"). In addition, these Vlachs often served the advancing Ottoman forces by spying in enemy Christian territory. In exchange for their regular duties in the military and in guarding the borders; Ottoman authorities granted them by law certain rights, such as that of being largely exempted of paying any tax but only that of an annual rent of one gold 'ducat' or 'florin' to pay by each one of their households, hence coming to be called as "Florin" or "Ducat Vlachs" (Ottoman Turkish: Filurîci Eflakân). Therefore, it can be similarly concluded that, this time, as Hasan Predojević's armies were advancing throughout the Croatian Frontier, the Spahije who were participating in the Beglerbeg's campaigns in Habsburg Croatia; were, at the same time, to establish themselves as landowning lords in those newly conquered regions, while, at the same time, taking advantage of the Vlach-Serb manpower to work their newly acquired estates.

== Bibliography ==
- Malcolm, Noel (2015). Agents of Empire: Knights, Corsairs, Jesuits and Spies in the Sixteenth-century Mediterranean World. Oxford University Press. ISBN 9780190262785.
