= Ivan II =

Ivan II may refer to:

- Ivan II of Bulgaria (c. 1290 – c. 1329)
- Ivan II of Moscow (1326–1359; patronymic Ivanovich, styled "the Fair")
- Ivan II Draskovic, Croatian viceroy (1550–1613)
