= Novi Dvori Cesargradski =

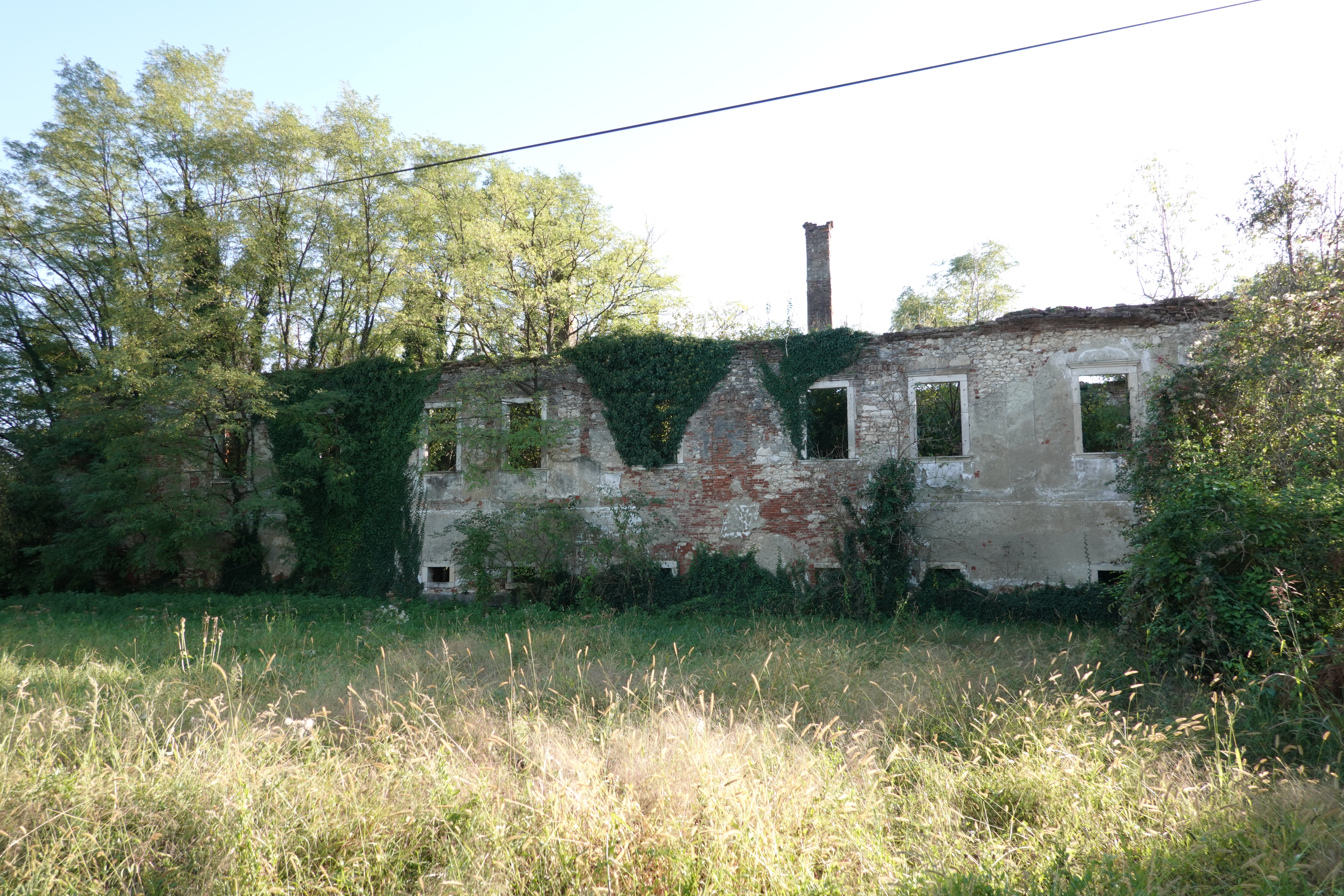
- Interactive map of Novi Dvori Cesargradski
- 46°1′27.48″N 15°43′48.72″E
- Location: Novi Dvori Klanječki, Croatia

History
- Built: 1603

Site notes
- Architectural style: Late Renaissance

Cultural Good of Croatia
- Official name: Kompleks dvorca "Novi Dvori Klanječki"
- Type: Protected cultural good
- Reference no.: Z-4595

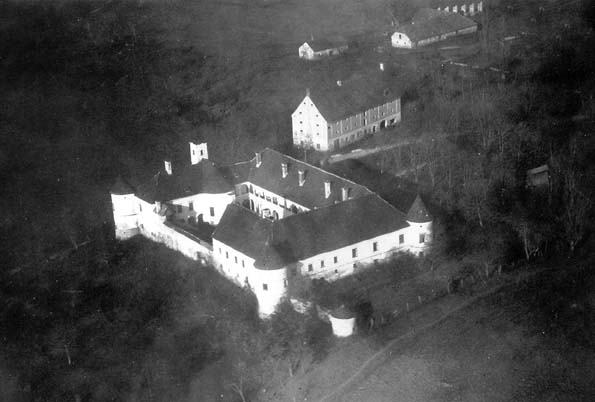
The castle in 1939, before it fell fully into ruin

Novi Dvori Cesargradski, also known as Novi Dvori Klanječki, is a ruined late-Renaissance castle in Novi Dvori Klanječki, Krapina-Zagorje County, Croatia. It lies near the town of Klanjec, in the Hrvatsko Zagorje region. The castle is the centrepiece of a former feudal estate built by the noble Erdődy family in the early 17th century, and is protected as a cultural good of the Republic of Croatia.

== History ==
The castle was built in 1603 by the Croatian ban Tamás Erdődy, as recorded by the date carved on an inscribed stone slab bearing the family coat of arms that once stood above the portal. The Erdődy family raised it after abandoning nearby Cesargrad, a medieval castle that had been damaged in the Croatian–Slovenian Peasant Revolt of 1573. The castle at Novi Dvori was never completed; as a result its inner courtyard was closed on three sides by arcaded wings, while a wall was raised in place of the intended southern wing.

== Architecture ==
The ruined castle, together with its surviving granary and the estate manager's curia, forms part of a former feudal complex situated south of Klanjec, along the road leading towards Zaprešić.

The castle belongs to the type of late-Renaissance four-wing castles with an inner courtyard and cylindrical corner towers. Today it survives as ruins, with the perimeter walls of the north and east wings standing without roofs, the corner towers collapsed, and the walls of the chapel's sanctuary and the Renaissance stone portal on the north façade still preserved.
