= Krsto Ungnad =

Krsto Ungnad or Kristóf Ungnád was a baron and Croatian ban, whose father was named Ivan.

In 1557 Ungnad, as a captain in the Croatian army, defeated the Turks in Koprivnica.

Before becoming ban he was mayor of Varaždin. He assumed the role of ban in 1578. During his reign he is known to have settled a land dispute in Turopolje. He also lost territory to Ottoman Bosnia and the Croatian border was pushed north from the river Una to the Kupa.

Ungnad was a proponent of the Protestant Reformation and it saw some gains in Croatia during his rule.

== Family ==
He married Anna Loszony

Anna who married Toma Erdödy.

He plays a large role in August Šenoa’s peak work Zlatarevo zlato.

Preceded by Gašpar Alapić	Ban of Croatia; 1578-1583	Succeeded by Tamás Erdődy
