= Battle of Sisak =

Part of the Long Turkish and Hundred Years' Croatian-Ottoman Wars (1593)

- Part of the Long Turkish War and the Hundred Years' Croatian–Ottoman War
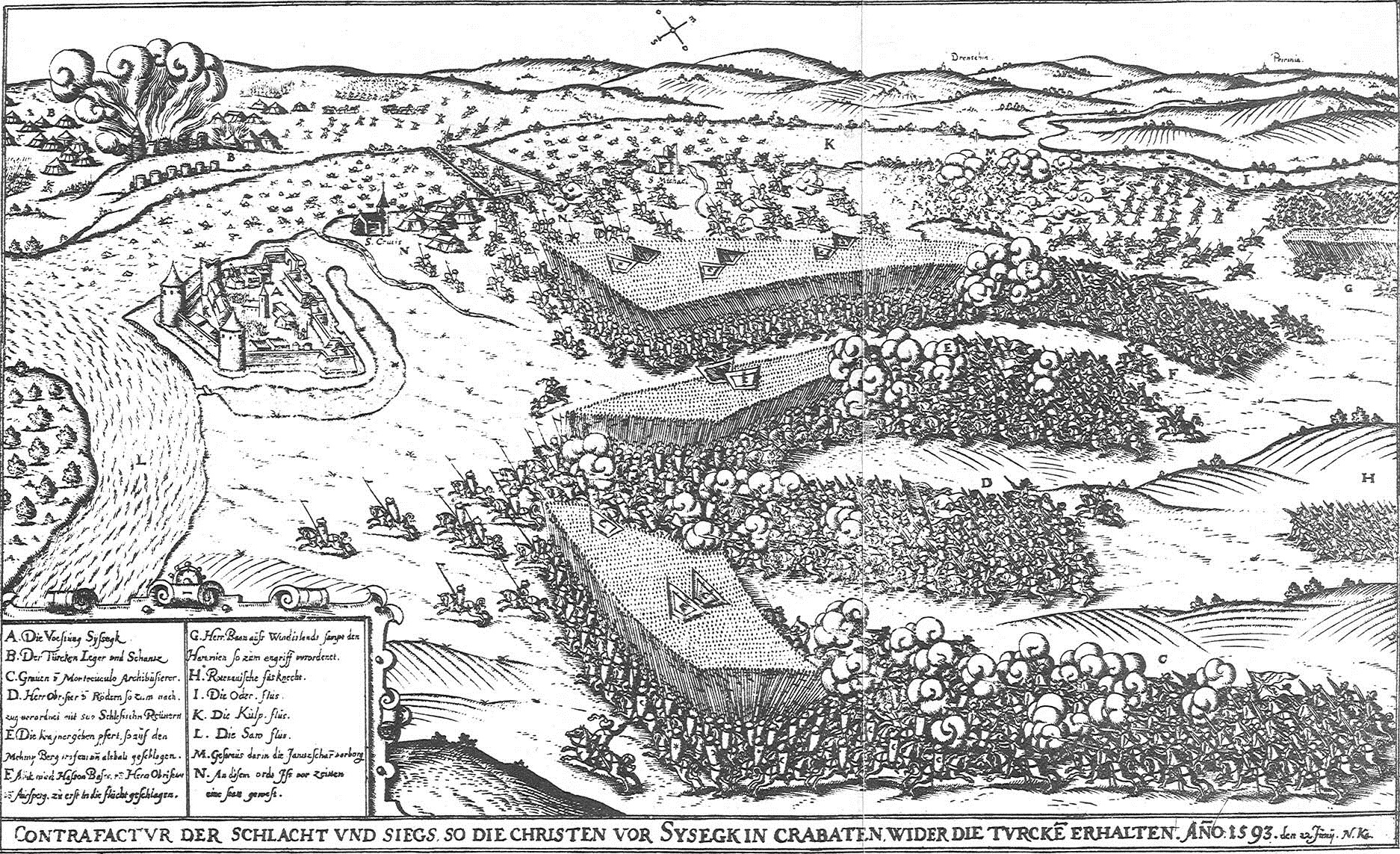
- Christians Before Sisak, Croatia A.D. 1593 (from book by Hieronymus Oertel, Nuremberg 1665)
Date	22 June 1593
Location	Sisak, Kingdom of Croatia, Habsburg monarchy 45°28′14″N 16°23′10″E
Result	Habsburg victory

Belligerents
Ottoman Empire; Bosnia Eyalet	Habsburg Monarchy; Kingdom of Croatia; Archduchy of Austria; Inner Austria (including forces from Duchy of Styria and Duchy of Carniola)

Commanders and leaders
Ottoman Commanders: Telli Hasan Pasha †; Bosnian and Provincial Commanders: Sultanzade Mehmed-beg of Hersek †; Džafer-beg of Pakrac-Cernica †; Arnaud Memi Bey of Zvornik †; Ramazan Bey of Pojega †; Arpadi Bey of Klis-Livno †; Ibrahim-beg of Lika	Commanders of Sisak garrison: Matija Fintić †; Blaž Đurak; Commanders of relief army: Ruprecht von Eggenberg; Tamás Erdődy; Andreas von Auersperg; Stephan Grasswein; Melchior of Redern

Strength
Ottoman army: 12,000–16,000 (German, Croatian, and Slovenian sources only)	Sisak garrison: 300–800; Habsburg relief army: 4,000–5,000 Total: 4,300–5,800 (Slovenian and Croatian sources only)

Casualties and losses
8,000 killed or drowned	50–500

The Battle of Sisak (Note: Croatian: Bitka kod Siska; Slovene: Bitka pri Sisku; German: Schlacht bei Sissek; Turkish: Kulpa Bozgunu) was fought on 22 June 1593 between Ottoman Bosnian forces and a combined Christian army from the Habsburg lands, mainly the Kingdom of Croatia and Inner Austria. The battle took place at Sisak, central Croatia, at the confluence of the Sava and Kupa rivers, on the borderland between Christian Europe and the Ottoman Empire.

Between 1591 and 1593 the Ottoman military governor of Bosnia, Beglerbeg Telli Hasan Pasha, attempted twice to capture the fortress of Sisak, one of the garrisoned castles that the Habsburgs maintained in Croatia as part of the Military Frontier. In 1592, after the key imperial fortress of Bihać fell to the Turks, only Sisak stood in the way before Croatia's main city Zagreb. Pope Clement VIII called for a Christian league against the Ottomans, and the Sabor recruited in anticipation a force of about 5,000 professional soldiers.

On 15 June 1593, Sisak was once again besieged by the Bosnian Pasha and his Gazis. The Sisak garrison was commanded by Blaž Đurak and Matija Fintić, both Croatian priests from the Diocese of Zagreb. A Habsburg relief army, under the supreme command of the Styrian general Ruprecht von Eggenberg, was quickly assembled to break the siege. The Croatian troops were led by the Ban of Croatia, Tamás Erdődy, while major forces from the Duchy of Carniola and the Duchy of Carinthia were under the commander of the Croatian Military Frontier Andreas von Auersperg, known as the "Carniolan Achilles".

On 22 June, the Austro-Croatian relief army launched a surprise attack on the besieging forces, and at the same time the garrison came out of the fortress to join the attack; the ensuing battle resulted in a crushing defeat for the Bosnian Ottoman army, with Hasan Pasha being killed in action and almost all of his army being wiped out. The battle of Sisak is considered the main catalyst for the start of the Long War which raged between the Habsburgs and the Ottomans from 1593 to 1606.

== Background ==
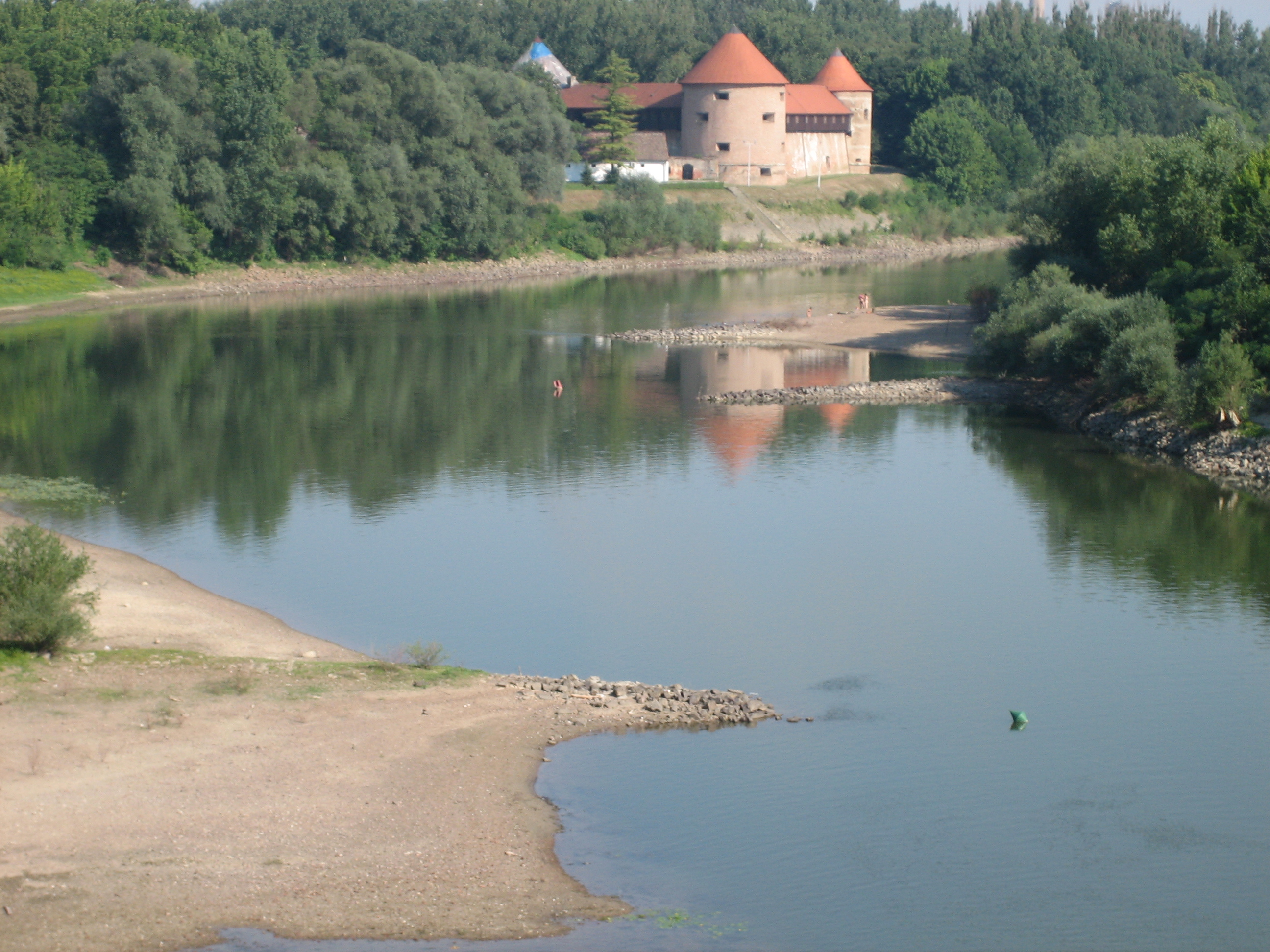
Sisak fortress today.

The central authorities of both the Ottoman Empire and the Habsburg monarchy were rather reluctant to fight each other, after both having fought several campaigns on Hungarian and Moldavian lands, and four renewals of the 1547 truce; but large scale military raids were being launched into each other's territories: There had been numerous raids into Habsburg Hungary by the akıncılar, the irregular Ottoman light cavalry, while on the other hand, Uskoci (Balkan Habsburg-sided irregular soldiers on the eastern Adriatic coast) were being encouraged to conduct raids into Ottoman territory in the Balkans. Clashes on the Croatian frontier also continued despite the truce. The Croatian–Ottoman border went between Koprivnica and Virovitica to Sisak, then westward to Karlovac, southward to Plitvice Lakes, and southwestward to the Adriatic Sea. Croatia at the time had only 16,800 km² of free territory and around 400,000 inhabitants.

Although their strength was depleted from the constant conflicts on the border, in the late 16th century Croatian fortified cities were able to hold Ottoman forces at bay. During this period, Ottoman Bosnian forces had made several attempts to seize major forts and towns across the Una and Sava rivers. On 26 October 1584, smaller Ottoman units were defeated at the battle of Slunj, and on 6 December 1586 near Ivanić-Grad. However, Ottoman raids and attacks were increasing and the Croatian nobility were fighting without Habsburg support.

The Uskok attack on the Sanjak of Krka deeply angered both the Muslim population and the Ottoman administration in the region. Ibrahim, Sanjak-bey of Krka, went to Constantinople to make conversations with high ranking officials. He asked for compensation for the damage caused by Uskok incursions. Ottoman officials asked for reports on the issue from the Venetian ambassador in Istanbul, as from the Ottomans' point of view the Uskok raiders were subjected to the Republic of Venice. But the Venetian ambassador rejected the accusations and said that the Uskoks were subjected to the Holy Roman Empire. Ibrahim then requested that a letter be written to the German emperor complaining about the damage caused by Uskoks, in accordance with the Ahidnâme. The Ottoman Grand Vizier commissioned Telli Hasan Pasha, who had been newly appointed as Beylerbey of Bosnia, to make investigation on the issue. No letter written to the Holy Roman Empire regarding the Krka raid has been found in the archives. Regardless of whether the letter was sent or not, it is clear that the Ottomans could not find anyone who would make talks on the issue, and soon they began to prepare for war to take revenge on both the Uskok raiders and their supporters.

== Premise ==
In August 1591, without a declaration of war, Telli Hasan Pasha, Ottoman Beylerbey of the Eyalet of Bosnia and vizier, attacked Croatia and reached Sisak, but was repelled after four days of fighting. Tamás Erdődy, Ban of Croatia, then launched a counterattack and seized much of the Moslavina region. The same year Hasan Pasha launched another attack, taking the town of Ripač on the Una River. These raids forced Erdődy to convene a meeting of the Sabor in Zagreb on 5 January 1592, and to declare a general uprising to defend the country. These actions of the regional Ottoman forces under Hasan Pasha seem to have been contrary to the interest and policy of the central Ottoman administration in Constantinople, and rather due to aims of conquest and organized plundering by the war-like Bosnian Sipahi, although perhaps also under the pretext of putting an end to Uskok raids into the Eyalet; since the two realms had signed a nine-year peace treaty earlier in 1590.

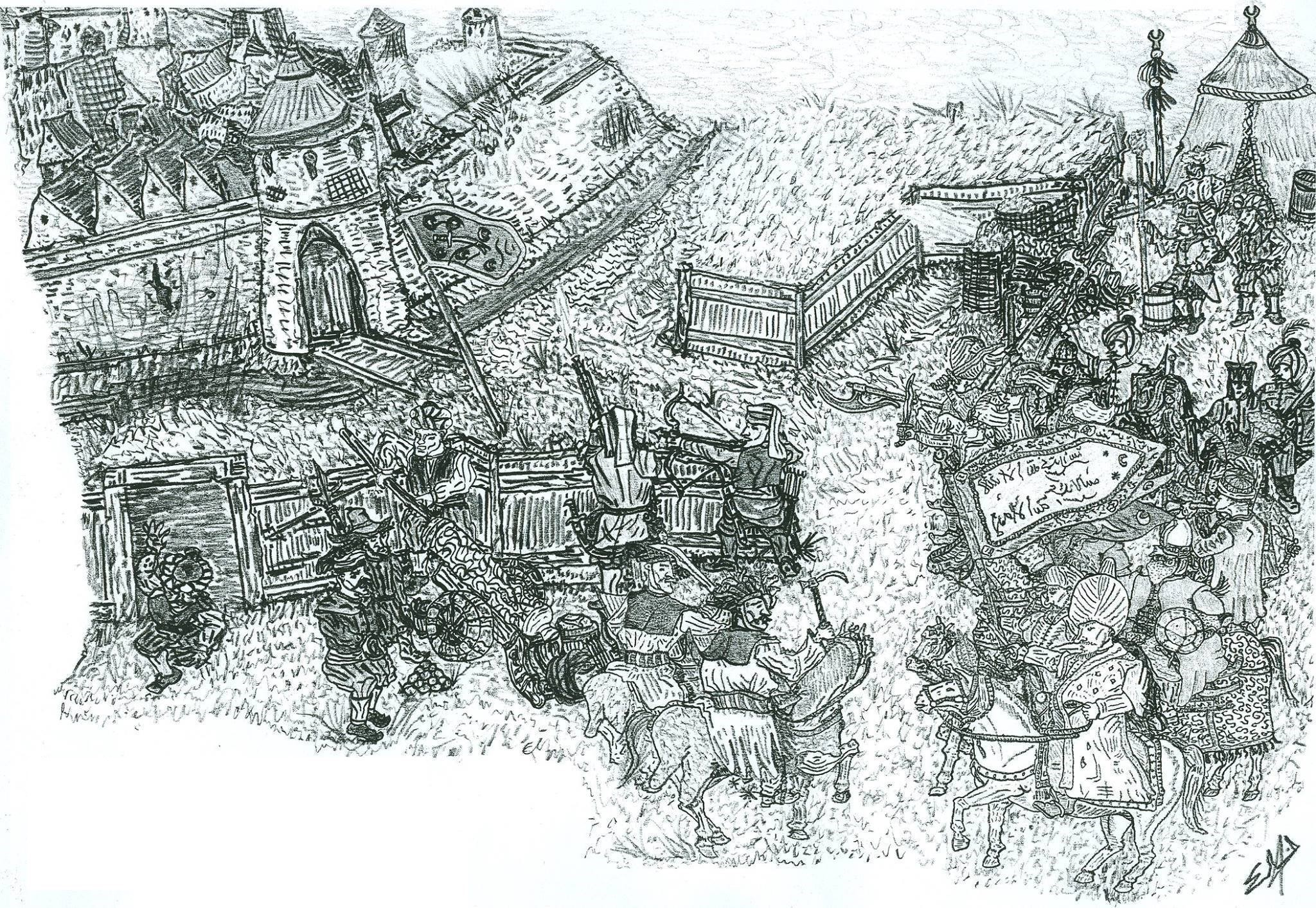
Modern representation of the successful assault on the Habsburg Croatian fortified town of Bihać (Bihka in Ottoman Turkish) by the Ejalet-i Bosna Ottoman provincial forces led by Gazi Hasan-paša Predojević, in 1592.

In June 1592 Hasan Pasha captured Bihać and directed his forces towards Sisak for the second time. The fall of Bihać caused fear in Croatia since it had stood on the border for decades. Hasan Pasha also successfully captured and burnt the Ban's military encampment in Brest on 19 July 1592, built by Erdődy a few months earlier near Petrinja. The camp had around 3,000 men, while the Ottoman forces had around 7–8,000. On 24 July, the Ottomans started besieging Sisak, but lifted the siege after 5 days of fighting and having suffered heavy losses, leaving the region of Turopolje ravaged. These events encouraged the Emperor to engage in further efforts to stop the Ottomans, whose actions were being halted by the winter.

== Battle ==
In the spring of 1593, Beylerbey Telli Hasan Pasha gathered a large army in Petrinja, and on 15 June again crossed the Kupa River and conducted his third attack on Sisak. His Bosnian Ottoman army consisted of around 12,000–16,000 troops from the sanjaks of Klis, Lika, Zvornik, Herzegovina, Pojega, and Cernik. Sisak was defended by 800 men at most, and commanded by Matija Fintić, who died on 21 June, and Blaž Đurak, both being priests from Kaptol, seat of the Roman Catholic bishop of Zagreb. The town suffered heavy artillery fire, and a call for help was sent to the Croatian ban. Reinforcements led by Austrian Colonel-General Ruprecht von Eggenberg, Ban Tamás Erdődy, and Colonel Andreas von Auersperg, arrived nearby Sisak on 21 June. They numbered around 4,000–5,000 cavalry and infantry. Mustafa Naima narrates that, after making the preparations before the battle, Hasan Pasha ordered Gazi Hodža Memi Bey, father of Sarhoš Ibrahim Pasha, a renowned military commander, to cross the river and identify the enemy forces. He reported back that a battle would end in ruin, as the Habsburg army had a very superior force (probably referring to its larger quantity of guns and ammunition). Naima also narrates that after hearing this, Hasan Pasha, who was credited as a fearless military leader, and happened to be playing chess at that very moment, severely responded to him: Curse you, you despicable wretch! to be afraid of numbers: out of my sight!, and then he mounted his horse and began to mobilize the Ottoman forces across the bridges he had previously ordered to be constructed.

Croatian Ban Tamás Erdődy set out to relieve the besieged town with 1,240 of his soldiers. He was joined by Andreas von Auersperg with 300 mounted archebusiers from Carniola and Carinthia, then by Ruprecht Eggenberg with 300 German soldiers, by Stjepan Grasswein, commander of the Slavonian Krajina, with 400 horsemen, by Petar Erdődy with 500 Žumberak Uskoks, by Melchior Rödern with 500 Silesian horsemen armed with firearms, by Adam Rauber of Weineck with 200 archebusiers, by Krštofor Obrutschan with 100 soldiers, by Stjepan Tahy with 80 hussars, by Martin Pietschnik from Altenhof with 100 soldiers, by Georg Sigismund Paradeiser, commanding 160 musketeers from Karlovac, Carinthia and Carniola, by Ferdinand Weidner with 100-foot soldiers, and by Count Montecuccoli with 100 horsemen. In addition, the following Croatian captains were present with their armies: Ivan Draskovic, Benedict Thuroczy, Franjo Orehovački, Vuk of Druškovca and Count Stjepan X Blagajski (d. 1598). In all, this Croatian-Slovenian-German army, which came to the aid of the besieged Croatian town, gathered about 5,000–6,000 fighters, with more than two-thirds of them being Croatian.

On 22 June, between eleven and twelve o'clock, Erdődy and Auersperg's forces attacked Ottoman positions with Erdődy's army in front, consisting such an army of Croatian Hussars and infantry. The first assault was repulsed by the Ottoman cavalry. Then the soldiers of Colonel Auersperg joined the attack, followed by Eggenberg's and other commanders' troops, forcing the Ottomans to retreat towards the Kupa River. The army of Hasan Pasha was driven into a corner between the rivers Odra and the Kupa, with the bridge across the Kupa being taken by soldiers from Karlovac. The Sisak garrison led by Blaž Đurak attacked the remaining Ottoman forces that were besieging Sisak. Caught between two Christian army flanks, the Ottomans panicked and started a chaotic retreat, trying to swim across the Kupa River and reach their camp. The bulk of the army, with most of its commanders, ended up either slaughtered or drowned in the river.

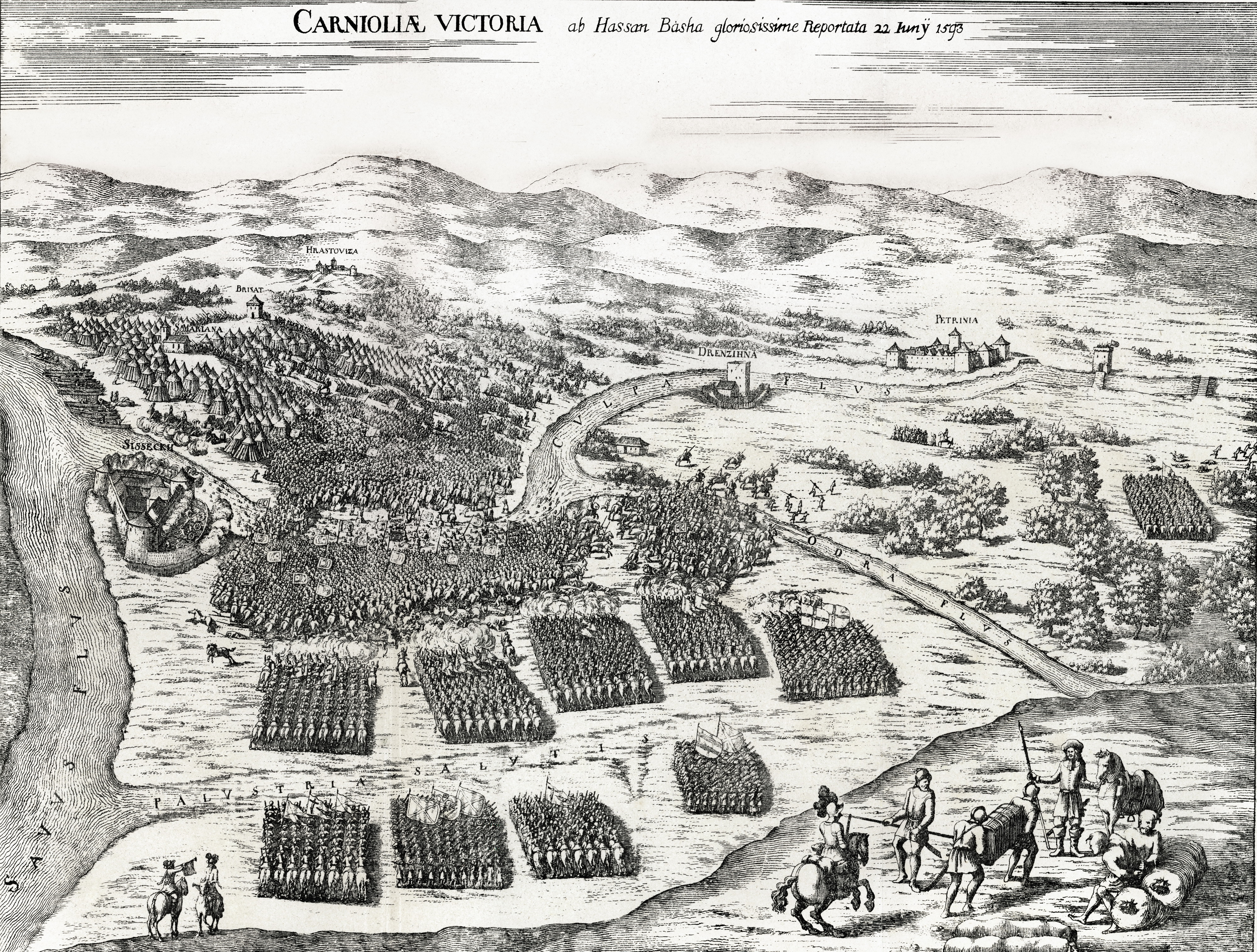
The fatal cavalry charge by Telli Hasan Pasha, during the Battle of Sisak in 1593.

The battle lasted around one hour and ended in a total defeat for the Ottomans. Predojević (Nikola Predojević was the original name of Telli Hasan Pasha) did not survive the battle. Among the Ottoman commanders that were killed or had drowned in the Kupa were Sultanzade Mehmed Bey of the Sanjak of Herzegovina, Džafer Bey, Sanjak-bey of Pakrac Cernica and Hasan Pasha's brother, Arnaud Memi Bey of the Sanjak of Zvornik, and Ramazan Bey of the Sanjak of Pojega. Ibrahim Bey of the Sanjak of Lika managed to escape. Total Ottoman losses were around 8,000 killed or drowned. The Christian army captured 2,000 horses, 10 war flags, falconets, and artillery ammunition left by the Ottomans. Christian army losses were light; a report from Andreas von Auersperg submitted to Archduke Ernest on 24 June 1593 mentions only 40–50 casualties among his men.

== Aftermath and consequences ==
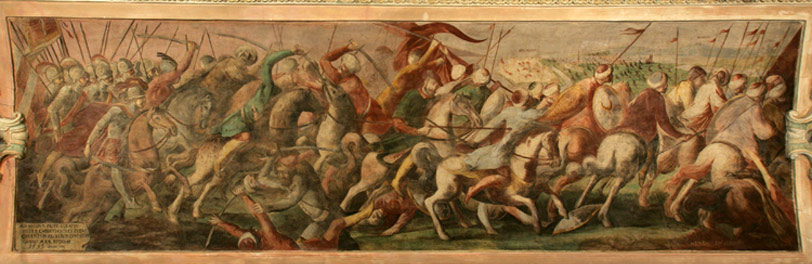
Painting of the Battle of Sisak by Hans Rudolf Miller.

Christian Europe was delighted at the pompous reports of the victory at Sisak. Pope Clement VIII praised the Christian military leaders, sending a letter of gratitude to Ban Erdődy, while King Philip II of Spain named Erdődy a knight of the Order of Saint Saviour. The Diocese of Zagreb built a chapel in the village of Greda, near Sisak, to commemorate the victory, and the bishop decreed that a mass of thanksgiving should be held every 22 June in Zagreb. The cloak of Hasan Pasha was given to the Ljubljana Cathedral. Blaž Đurak, commander of the Sisak garrison, was awarded by the Croatian Parliament for his contribution to the victory.

Ban Tamás Erdődy wished to take advantage of the victory and to take Petrinja, where the remnants of the Ottoman army had fled to. However, Colonel General Eggenberg considered that there was not enough food supply for their army and the attack on Petrinja was halted. After news of the defeat reached Constantinople, revenge was demanded from the military leaders and the Sultan's sister, whose son Mehmed had been killed in the battle. Although the action of Hasan Pasha was not in accordance with the interests and policy of the Porte, the Sultan felt that such an embarrassing defeat, even of a vassal acting on his own initiative, could not go unavenged. Sultan Murad III declared war on Emperor Rudolf II that same year, starting the Long War, which was fought mainly in Hungary. The war extended through the reign of Mehmed III (1595–1603) and into that of Ahmed I (1603–1617).

During that war, the Ottomans managed to take Sisak. On 24 August 1593, the Ottomans took advantage of the absence of a large army nearby Sisak, which was defended by 100 soldiers only. With strong cannon fire they managed to break through the walls, and on 30 August the fortress surrendered. On 10 September 1593, Sisak was captured by an Ottoman army under the command of Mehmed Pasha, Beglerbeg of Rumelia. On 11 August 1594, the Ottoman garrison fled and set the fortress on fire. The Long War ended with the Peace of Zsitvatorok, on 11 November 1606, marking the first sign of a definitive halting of Ottoman expansion into Central Europe, as well as the stabilization of the frontier for half a century. Inner Austria, with the duchies of Styria, Carinthia, and Carniola, remained free from Ottoman control. Habsburg realm in Croatia was also able to maintain its weakened borders from further Ottoman incursions and made some territorial gains following the peace treaty, such as Petrinja, Moslavina, and Čazma. It is also important to point out that after this first major Ottoman defeat in northwestern Balkans, the Orthodox Christian subjects of the empire, particularly Serbs and Vlachs (who had several rebellions against Ottomans) were called by Habsburgs to inhabit the border area, both by emigrating from Ottoman-controlled lands to those of the Habsburgs, and even by revolting against the Ottomans in their own territory (Uprising in Banat).

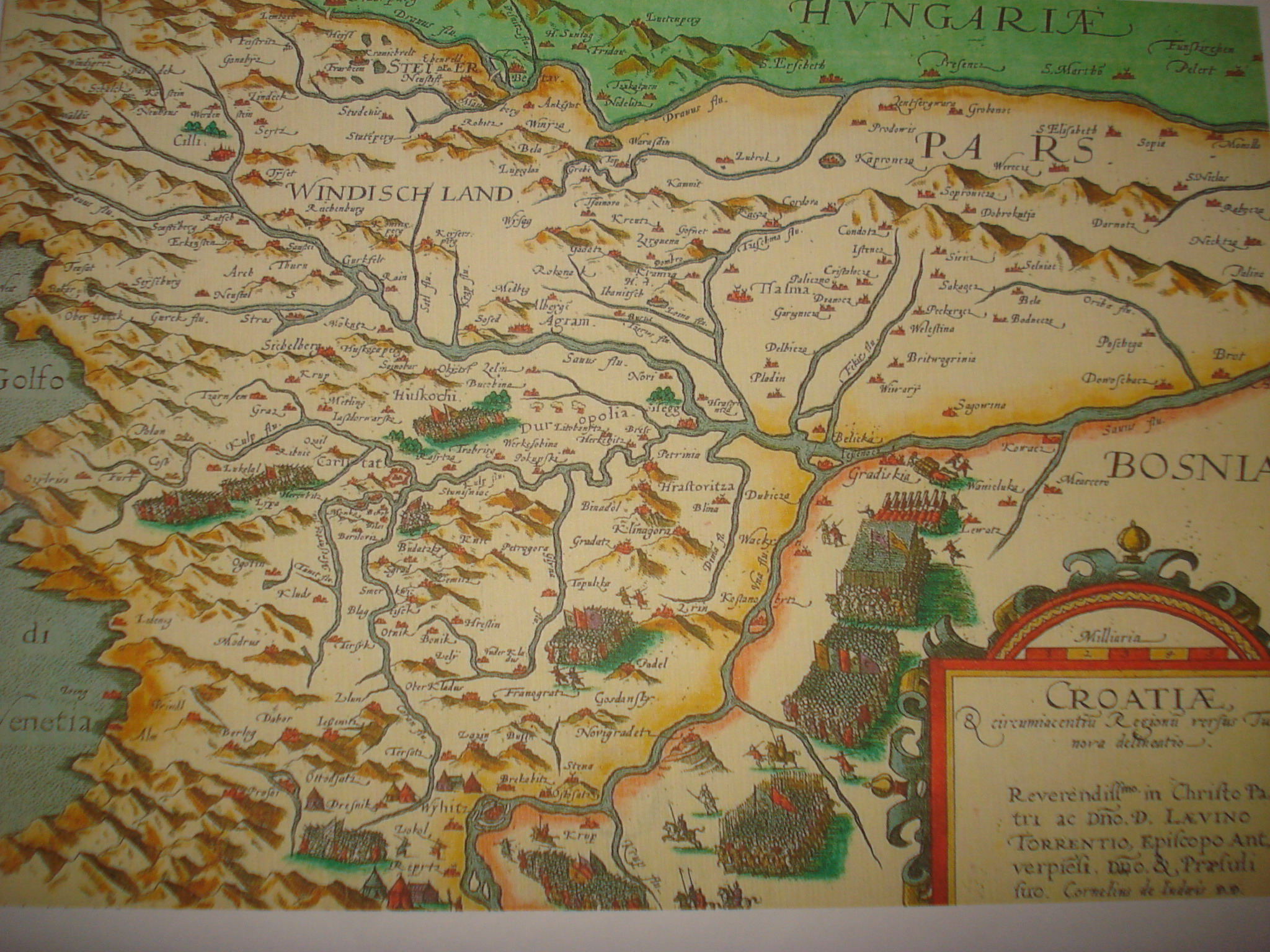
An old map of Croatia from the time of the battle.

== Legacy ==
As the battle took place on Croatian territory and the main body of the Christian defenders consisted of Croatian troops, the victory has ever since played a major role in the historiography of Croatia. The Croatian government issued a commemorative stamp in 1993 called "Victory at Sisak". The traditional daily ringing of the small bell of Zagreb Cathedral, at 2 pm, is in memory of the battle, as it was the bishop of Zagreb who had borne the large part of the costs of the Sisak fortress.

Since fighters from neighbouring Carniola and Styria reinforced the defenders, the battle is also a part of the Slovenian tradition. On 22 June 1993, the Republic of Slovenia issued three memorial coins and a postage stamp to commemorate the 400 years anniversary of the battle of Sisak. Until 1943, an annual commemoration service was held in the Catholic Church of Ljubljana, with the officiating priest wearing the cloak worn by Hasan Pasha in the day of the battle.

== See also ==
- Hundred Years' Croatian–Ottoman War

== Literature ==
- Stanford J. Shaw (1976), History of the Ottoman Empire and Modern Turkey: Vol. 1: Empire of Gazis, Cambridge: Cambridge University Press; ISBN 0-521-29163-1.
- Joseph von Hammer-Purgstall, Geschichte des Osmanischen Reiches Großentheils aus bisher unbenützten Handschriften und Archiven. Vol. 4: Vom Regierungsantritte Murad des Dritten bis zur zweyten Entthronung Mustafa des Ersten 1574–1623, Budapest: C. A. Hartleben, 1829. Reprint: Graz: Akademische Druck-u. Verlagsanstalt, 1963.
- Alfred H. Loebl, Das Reitergefecht bei Sissek vom 22. Juni 1593. Mitteilungen des Instituts für Österreichische Geschichtsforschung IX (1915), pp. 767–787. (German)
- Peter Radics, Die Schlacht bei Sissek, 22. Juni 1593, Ljubljana: Josef Blasnik, 1861 (German)
- Fanny S. Copland (translation from 18th century Slovene), The Slavonic and East European Review, vol. 27, no. 69, 1949, pp. 339–344, "The Battle of Sisek."
