= Illyrian amber jewellery =

There are numerous examples of Illyrian jewellery made of amber. They were made from the start of the Iron Age around 1000 BC, and their production continued down through the millennium. They are found in nearly all of Illyria, from Slovenia in the north, to Albania and North Macedonia in the south.

A group of small human and animal figures made out of amber are of particular interest. The sites with the most figures found are Ripač in Bosnia (15 figures in total of animals and humans) and Ormož in Slovenia (10 human and 13 animal figures). The purpose of these figures is still a mystery, and they could as well have been Illyrian deities, figures to represent the cult of the dead, or simply children's toys. Amber was a material that Illyrians were very fond of, and many of their jewellery and decorative objects were made of amber.

The analysis of the Iapodian necropolis near Kompolje, Otočac, first excavated in the 1950s, showed a number of amber artifacts, including various beads and necklaces, as well as those shaped as human heads, human figures and birds.
