= Battle of Brest (1592) =

1592 battle

- Part of the Ottoman wars in Europe; Ottoman–Croatian Wars
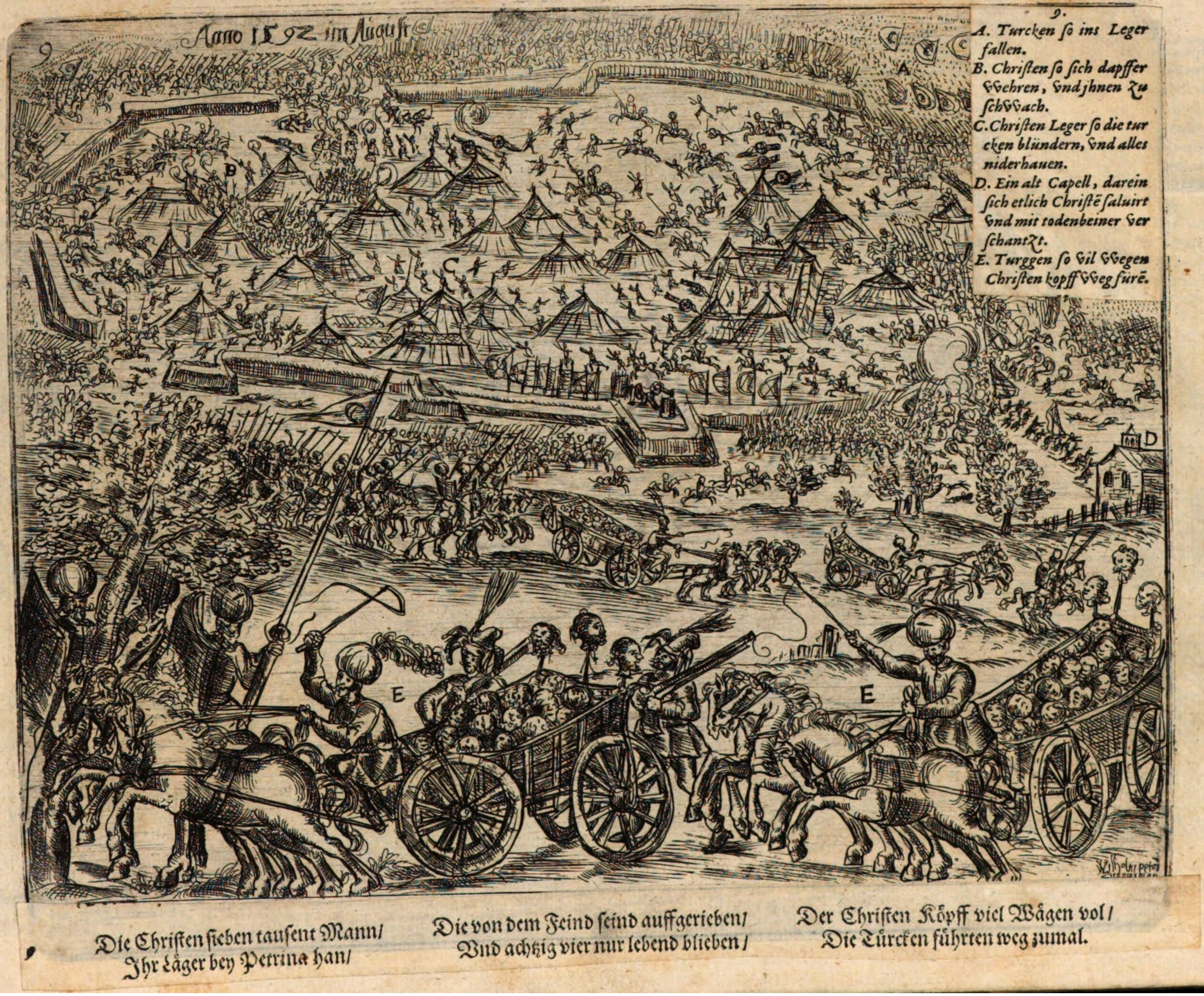
- Depiction of the battle by Wilhelm Peter Zimmermann, published in 1603
Date	19 July 1592
Location	Brest, Kingdom of Croatia, Habsburg monarchy
Result	Ottoman victory
Territorial changes	Brest captured by the Ottomans

Belligerents
Ottoman Empire; Eyalet of Bosnia	Habsburg Monarchy; Kingdom of Croatia; Duchy of Styria

Commanders and leaders
Hasan Predojević	Tamás Erdődy; Kristofor Peuchel

Strength
7,000–8,000 soldiers	6,000 soldiers

Casualties and losses
Unknown	800 killed

The Battle of Brest (Croatian: Bitka kod Bresta) was fought on 19 July 1592 between the Ottoman forces of Hasan Pasha Predojević, Beglerbeg of Bosnia, and the Germanic and Croatian forces led by Tamás Erdődy, Ban of Croatia. The battle was a part of the Croatian–Ottoman wars and Ottoman–Habsburg wars between the Ottoman Empire and the Habsburg monarchy.

The Ottoman forces were about 7,000-8,000 men from the recently captured fortress of Bihać, and Erdödy's army consisted of 1,600 infantry and 400 cavalry from Styria, 500 men arrived under Erdödy's command, and an unknown number (several hundred) of peasants from Croatia. In total, the forces gathered at Erdödy's camp were about 3,000 men. Predojević arrived near Brest with the bulk of his army on 18/19 July at night, and on 19 July he separated his forces in order to attack. Croatian forces were crushed and fled away from the battlefield. The Ottomans then attacked the Styrian forces and defeated them as well.

Following these successes, the Ottomans began to besiege the Sisak fortress.

== Bibliography ==
- Vojna enciklopedija (1970–76), 10 volumes, Vojno izdavački zavod Beograd, book 2, p. 8, article Brest (in Serbo-Croatian)
