= Fethija Mosque (Bihać) =

Mosque in Bihać, Bosnia and Herzegovina

- Fethija džamija
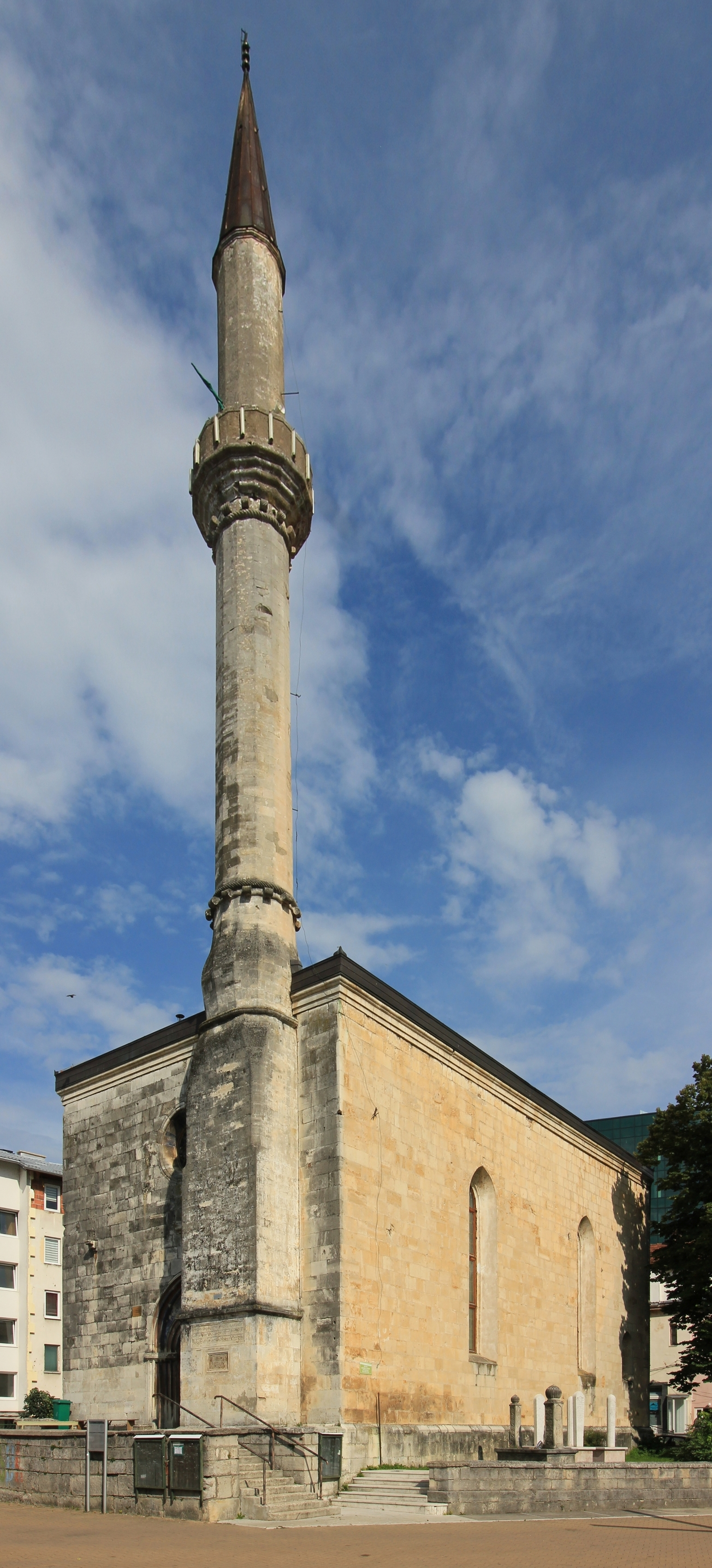

- Location of the mosque in Bosnia and Herzegovina

Religion
- Affiliation: Sunni Islam
- Ecclesiastical or organizational status: Mosque (since 1592– ); Church (1266–1592)
- Status: Active (as a mosque)

Location
- Location: Bihać, Federation of Bosnia and Herzegovina
- Country: Bosnia and Herzegovina
- Interactive map of Fethija Mosque
- Coordinates: 44°48′48″N 15°52′12″E

Architecture
- Type: Church
- Style: Gothic

Specifications
- Length: 22 m (72 ft)
- Width: 11.5 m (38 ft)
- Minaret: 1
- Materials: Bihacite; stone

The Fethija Mosque (Bosnian: Fethija džamija) is a mosque and former Catholic church, located in the town of Bihać, Bosnia and Herzegovina. Built in 1266 as the Church of Saint Anthony of Padua, it is the oldest Gothic building in the country. The Mosque is a National Monument of Bosnia and Herzegovina.

== History ==
Originally built as a Catholic church dedicated to Saint Anthony of Padua, it was subsequently transformed into a mosque following the 1592 conquest of Bihać by the Ottoman Empire. The building was originally accompanied by a Dominican monastery, which was also mentioned in a 13th-century charter of the Croatian nobility.

The Gothic bell tower of the building served as a minaret until 1863, when it was so dilapidated that it was pulled down and a new minaret was erected. During World War II the mosque was damaged – the roof and all the wooden elements in the interior were burnt, and there was damage to the minaret. After World War II conservation works on building commenced.

During the Austro-Hungarian rule, a new Church of Saint Anthony of Padua was built.

== See also ==
- Islam in Bosnia and Herzegovina
- List of mosques in Bosnia and Herzegovina
- Catholic Church in Bosnia and Herzegovina
