= Ivan Drašković =

Croatian nobleman

Ivan (II) Drašković
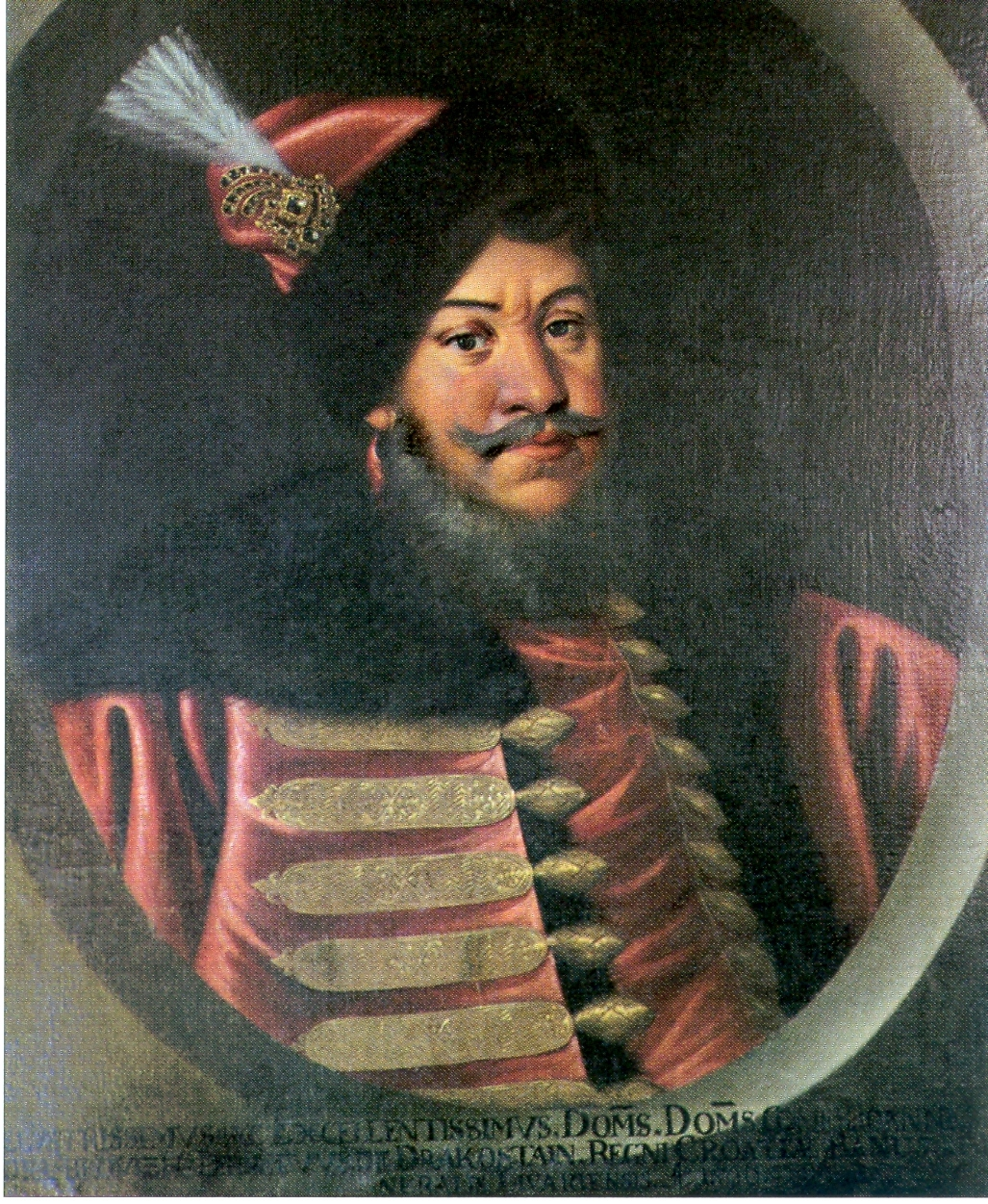

Ban of Croatia
- In office 1595–1606
- Preceded by: Gašpar Stankovački
- Succeeded by: Tamás Erdődy

Personal details
- Born: 1550 Trakošćan, Kingdom of Croatia, Habsburg monarchy
- Died: 11 March 1613 (aged 62–63) Poszony, Kingdom of Hungary
- Spouse: Eva Istvánffy
- Children: Nikola I. Jelena; Juraj IV. Ivan III.
- Parent(s): Gašpar Drašković; Catherine Szekely

Military service
- Battles/wars: Battle of Brest (1596)

Ivan II Drašković (Hungarian: Draskovich János; 1550 – 1613) was a Croatian nobleman and politician from the Drašković noble family. He was Ban of Croatia from 1595 to 1606.

== Biography ==
He was born as a son of Gašpar Drašković, from who he inherited the title of baron, and his hungarian wife Catherine Székely. Ivan Drašković married Hungarian Baroness Éva Istvánffy, daughter of Miklós Istvánffy. He is known as having defended Turopolje from the Ottoman Empire in 1570. He became Ban of Croatia in 1595. During his time in office, Drašković opposed Protestantism, which led to laws being brought which prohibited Protestants settling in Croatia.

Ivan Drašković renounced the office of Ban of Croatia during the Croatian Parliament session on 10 April 1606, but held the office until 1608. He was succeeded by Tamás Erdődy. His son and greatgrandson later became bans as well.

== Legacy ==
He is notable for his strong support and advocacy of the 1607 founding of the Classical Gymnasium in Zagreb, which is the first and oldest currently operating institution of higher education in the city.

Political offices
Preceded by Gašpar Stankovački	Ban of Croatia; 1595–1606	Succeeded by Tamás Erdődy
Preceded by Zsigmond Forgách	Master of the treasury 1610–1613	Succeeded by Tamás Erdődy
