= Battle of Slunj =

1584 battle

- Part of the Ottoman–Habsburg wars Ottoman–Croatian Wars
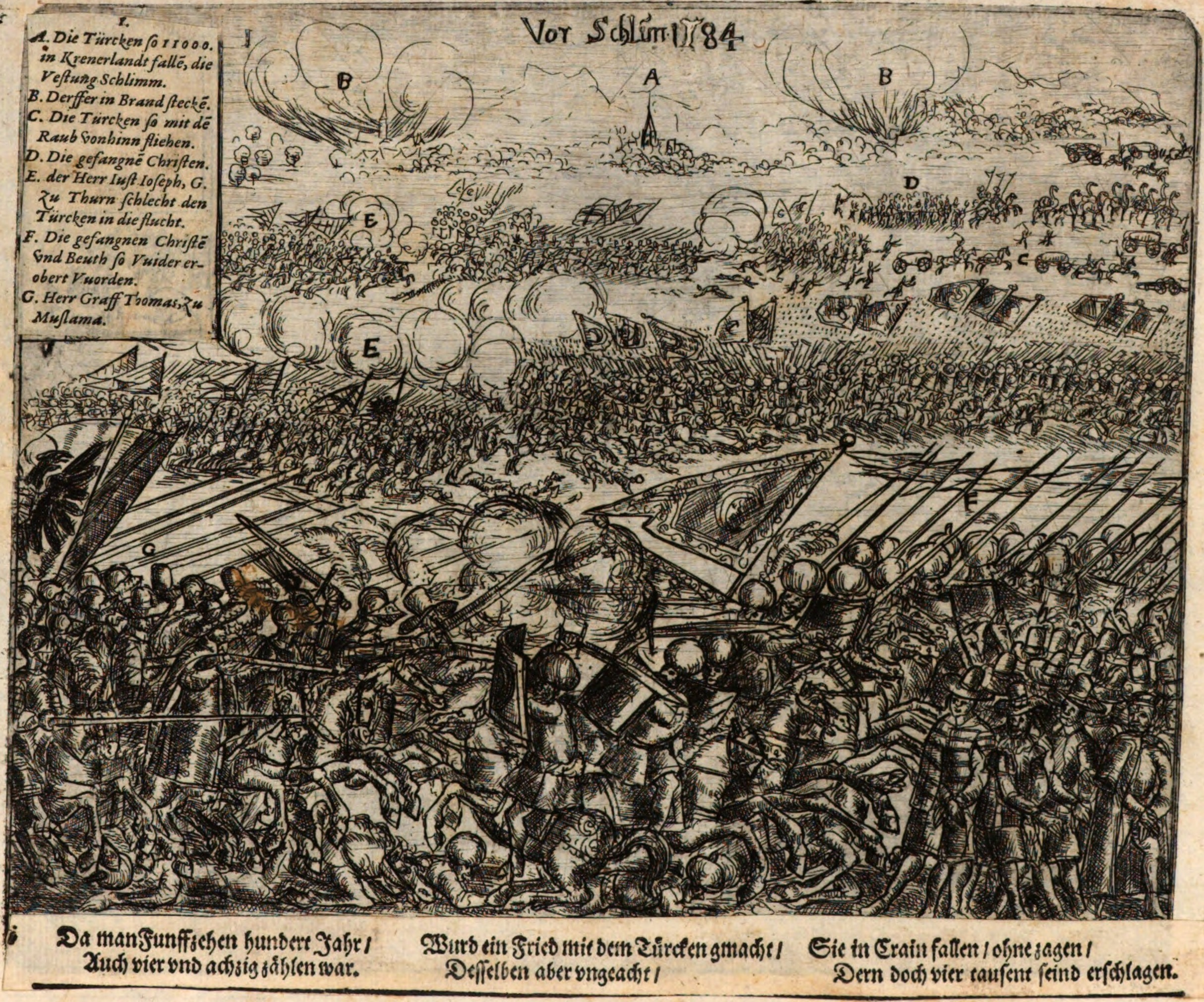
- Depiction of the battle by Wilhelm Peter Zimmermann, published in 1603
| Date | 26 October 1584 |
| Location | Slunj, Kingdom of Croatia, Habsburg monarchy |
| Result | Croatian victory |

Belligerents
| Ottoman Empire | Habsburg monarchy: Kingdom of Croatia |

Commanders and leaders
| Ferhad Pasha Sokolović | Jobst Joseph von Thurn; Tamás Erdődy |

Strength
| 8,400 cavalry 600 infantry | 1,330 cavalry 700 infantry |

Casualties and losses
| 2,000–4,000 killed | Unknown |

The Battle of Slunj (Croatian: Bitka kod Slunja) was fought on 26 October 1584 between the Ottoman forces of the Bosnian Beglerbeg, Ferhad Pasha Sokolović, and Germanic and Croatian forces led by Jobst Joseph von Thurn and Tamás Erdődy, the Ban of Croatia, that ambushed the Ottoman Army stationed near the town of Slunj. The battle was a part of the Croatian–Ottoman wars and Ottoman–Habsburg wars between the Ottoman Empire and the Habsburg monarchy. Ottoman troops were estimated at between 8-10,000 men, and the army of Thurn and Erdödy consisted of 1,330 cavalry and 700 infantry. The battle resulted in a crushing defeat for the Ottoman forces.

== Bibliography ==
- Vojna enciklopedija (1970–76), 10 svezaka plus indeks, Vojno izdavački zavod Beograd, knjiga 8, str 719, članak Slunj (Srpsko hrvatski jezik)
