= Brest Pokupski =

- Village
- Location within Croatia
- Coordinates: 45.453327°N 16.256976°E
- Country: Croatia
- Region: Continental Croatia (Banovina)
- County: Sisak-Moslavina
- Municipality: Petrinja

Area
  - Total: 10.5 km^{2} (4.1 sq mi)
- Elevation: 107 m (351 ft)

Population (2021)
  - Total: 292
  - Density: 27.8/km^{2} (72.0/sq mi)
- Time zone: UTC+1 (CET)
  - Summer (DST): UTC+2 (CEST)
- Postal code: 44250
- Area code: 044

Brest Pokupski is a village in Banovina region of Croatia. The settlement is administratively located in the Town of Petrinja and the Sisak-Moslavina County. According to the 2011 census it has 279 inhabitants. It is connected by the D30 state road. The village was damaged to a notable extent in the 2020 Petrinja earthquake and the subsequent shaking. Some of the damage was caused by soil liquefaction, a rare phenomenon observed for the first time in Croatia since the 1880 Zagreb earthquake.
