= Croatian–Ottoman wars =

Conflicts between the Kingdom of Croatia and the Ottoman Empire

Croatian–Ottoman Wars (Turkish: Osmanlı-Hırvatistan Savaşları, Croatian: Hrvatsko-osmanski ratovi) can refer to one of the several conflicts between the Kingdom of Croatia (as part of Kingdom of Hungary-Croatia and Habsburg Monarchy) and the Ottoman Empire:

- Long Campaign (1443–1444) of the King Vladislaus II of Hungary
- Hundred Years' Croatian–Ottoman War, War for Croatia - a period of near constant mostly low-intensity warfare ("Small War") approximately 1493–1593 (from the Battle of Krbava Field to the Battle of Sisak)
- Long War (1593–1606)
- Austro-Turkish War (1663–1664)
- Great Turkish War (1683–1699)
- Austro-Turkish War (1716–1718)
- Austro-Turkish War (1787–1791)

The Kingdom of Croatia-Hungary gradually lost most of its territory on the eastern Adriatic coast to the Ottomans, leaving only the possessions of the Republic of Venice in Dalmatia, for whom the Croats took part in the Ottoman–Venetian Wars. Of particular note for the history of Dalmatia was the Morean War.

== See also ==
- Ottoman–Hungarian wars
- Ottoman–Habsburg wars
- Hundred Years' Croatian–Ottoman War
- Devshirme

== Sources ==
- Milan Kruhek: Granice Hrvatskog Kraljevstva u međunarodnim državnim ugovorima, Povijesni prilozi 10/1991, p. 37-79
- Ferdo Šišić: Pregled povijesti hrvatskog naroda 600.-1526.
