= Ripač =

Ripač Рипач
- Village
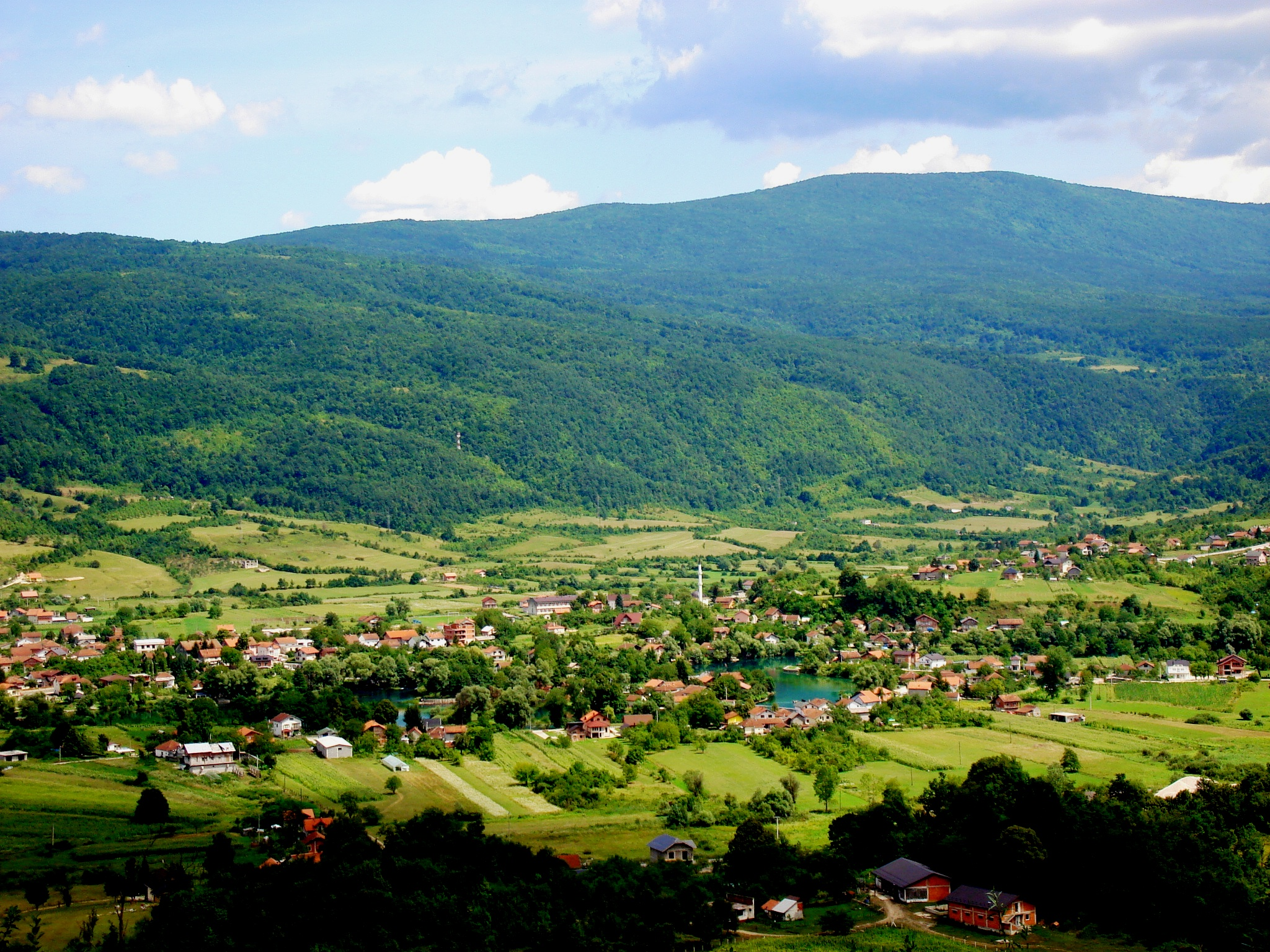

- Location within Bosnia and Herzegovina
- Coordinates: 44°46′N 15°57′E
- Country: Bosnia and Herzegovina
- Entity: Federation of Bosnia and Herzegovina
- Canton: Una-Sana
- Municipality: Bihać

Area
  - Total: 2.46 sq mi (6.36 km^{2})

Population (2013)
  - Total: 1,316
  - Density: 536/sq mi (207/km^{2})
- Time zone: UTC+1 (CET)
  - Summer (DST): UTC+2 (CEST)

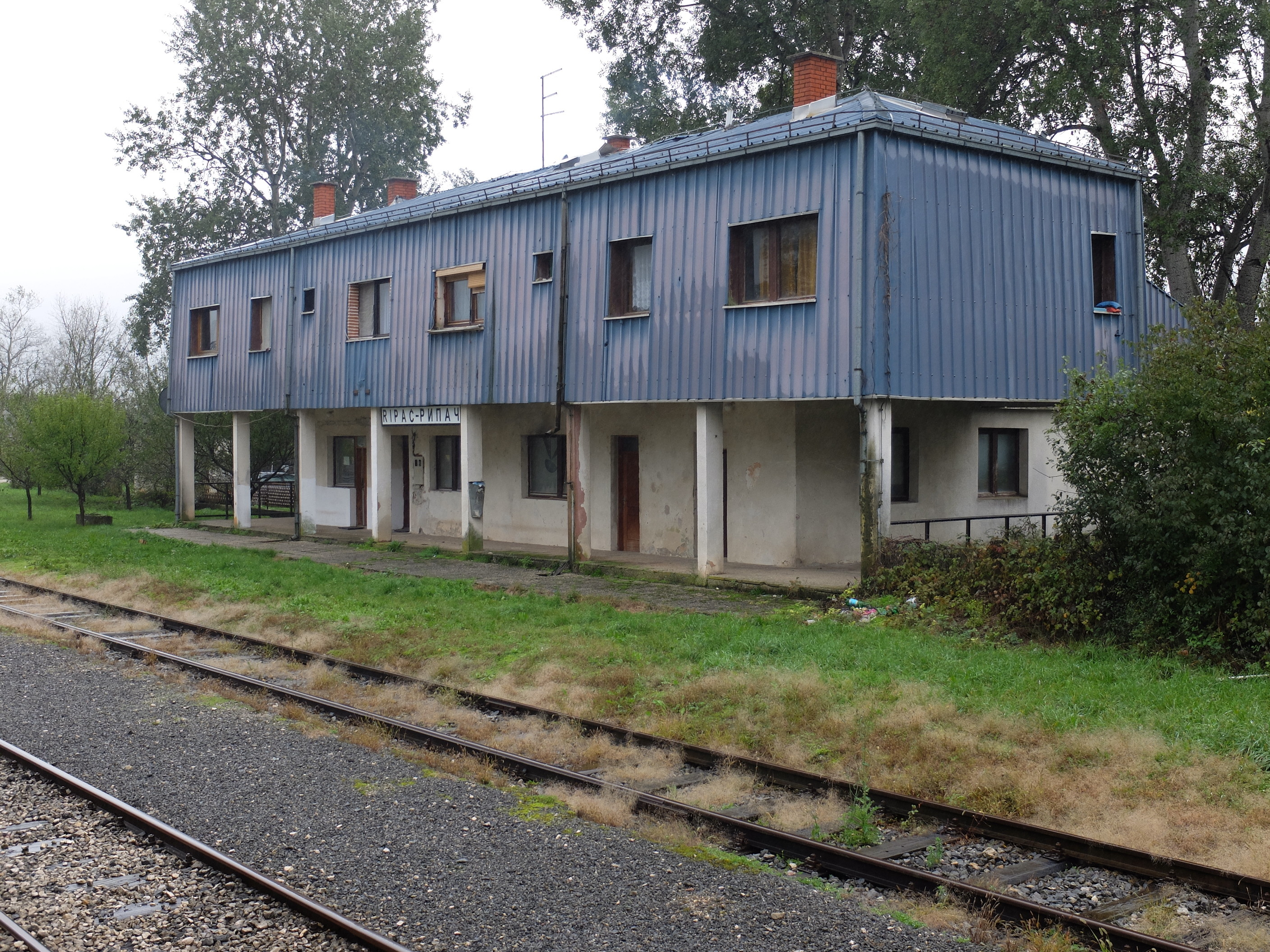
Railway station

Ripač (Serbian Cyrillic: Рипач) is a village in the municipality of Bihać, Bosnia and Herzegovina.

Ripač is the location of a border crossing with Croatia, across Užljebić.

== Demographics ==
According to the 2013 census, its population was 1,316.

Ethnicity in 2013
Ethnicity	Number	Percentage
Bosniaks	1,279	97.2%
Croats	13	1.0%
Serbs	5	0.4%
other/undeclared	19	1.4%
Total	1,316	100%

== See also ==
- Illyrian amber figures
