= Tamás Erdődy =

Hungarian-Croatian nobleman

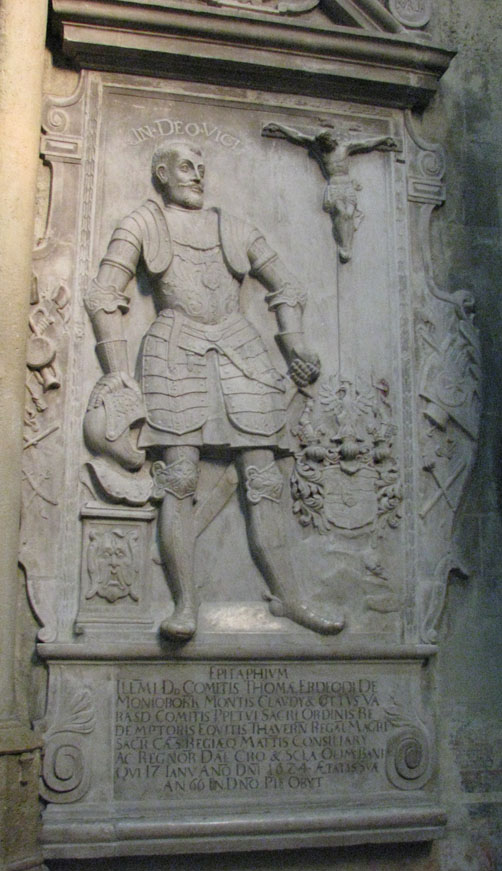
- Gravestone in Zagreb Cathedral

Ban of Croatia
- In office 25 September 1583 – 15 May 1595
- Preceded by: Krsto Ungnad
- Succeeded by: Gašpar Stankovački
- In office 1608 – 27 November 1614
- Preceded by: Ivan Drašković
- Succeeded by: Benedek Thuróczy

Personal details
- Born: 1558
- Died: 17 January 1624 (aged 65–66) Krapina, Kingdom of Croatia, Habsburg monarchy
- Resting place: Zagreb Cathedral, Croatia

Military service
- Battles/wars: Battle of Slunj (1584); Battle of Brest (1592); Battle of Sisak (1593)

Count Tamás Erdődy de Monyorókerék et Monoszló (Hungarian: monyorókeréki és monoszlói gróf Erdődy Tamás, Croatian: Toma Bakač Erdedi; 1558 – 17 January 1624), also anglicised as Thomas Erdődy, was a Hungarian-Croatian nobleman, who served as Ban of Croatia between 1583-1595 and 1608-1615 and a member of the Erdődy magnate family. He scored significant victories in wars against the Ottoman Empire's armies.

== Biography ==
Tamás Erdődy was born in 1558 as the son of former ban Péter Erdődy and Margit Tahy. He had two siblings. He married Maria Ungnad, the daughter of Croatian ban Krsto Ungnad, they had three sons (including ban Zsigmond Erdődy) and four daughters. Through his sons, Tamás Erdődy was also a grandfather of Hungarian nobles György Erdődy and Imre Erdődy.

He succeeded his father-in-law Krsto Ungnad as Ban of Croatia in 1583. His first victory occurred at the battle of Slunj in 1584. In 1591 he freed the Moslavina region. In 1592 he suffered his only great defeat at the battle of Brest. When Ottoman forces tried to retake the area in 1593, the battle of Sisak ensued in which the Holy Roman Empire defeated the Ottoman Empire, severely hampering the Ottoman's ability to expand further into Europe and triggering the Long Turkish War. For this victory Erdődy received congratulations from Pope Clement VIII and was knighted into the Order of Saint Saviour by Philip II of Spain. The phrase "In deo vici" (English: In god I have won) is attributed to him following the victory in Sisak.

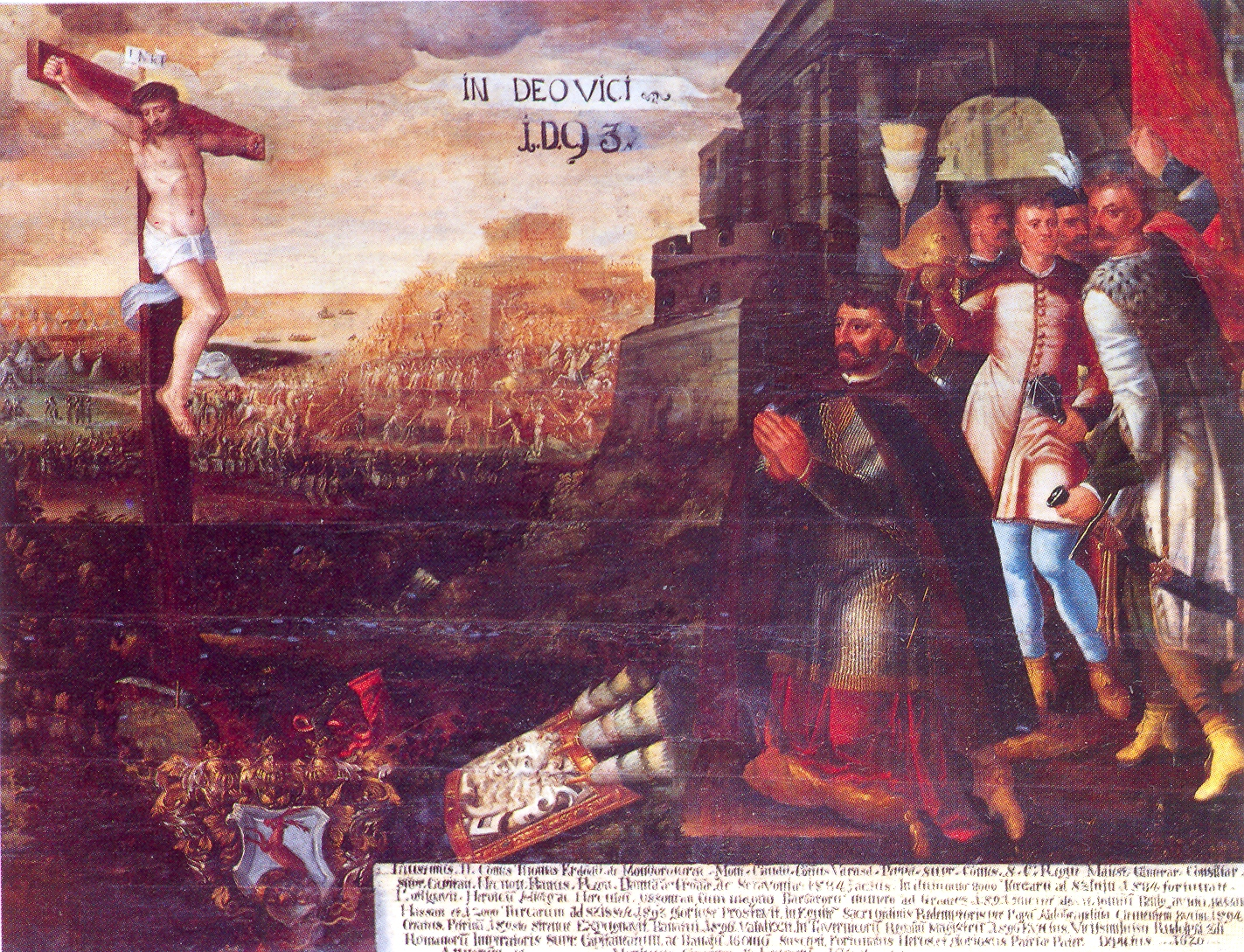
Ban Tamás Erdődy kneeling in prayer at the Battle of Sisak (1593), from a painting dated 1620

He left his role as ban in 1595. He served as master of the stewards between 1598 and 1603 then Master of the Treasury between 1603 and 1608. He participated in Stephen Bocskay's War of Independence as an ally of the Habsburgs. Meanwhile, he was also a perpetual count of Varaždin County since 1607, which position became hereditary since then, given to the Erdődy family.

Erdődy reclaimed the position of ban from 1608 to 27 November 1614 when he renounced his position, but held his rank at the request of the Croatian Parliament until a new Ban, Benedek Thuróczy, was named on 16 February 1615. Following that, Erdődy was made Master of the Treasury, holding the office until his death on 17 January 1624. During his lifetime he ran for the position of Palatine of Hungary twice (1596, 1611), but the Protestant estates prevented his election referring to his "religious intolerance".

Tamás Erdődy House of Erdődy Born: 1558 Died: 17 January 1624
Political offices
Preceded by Krsto Ungnad	Ban of Croatia; 1583–1595	Succeeded by Gašpar Stankovački
Preceded by Boldizsár Batthyány	Master of the stewards 1598–1603	Succeeded by György Thurzó
Preceded by Juraj Zrinski	Master of the treasury 1603–1608	Succeeded by Zsigmond Forgách
Preceded by Ivan Drašković	Ban of Croatia; 1608–1615	Succeeded by Benedek Thuróczy
Preceded by Ivan Drašković	Master of the treasury 1615–1624	Succeeded by Kristóf Bánffy
