= Croatia in personal union with Hungary =

Personal union of two kingdoms

Kingdom of Croatia and Dalmatia Kraljevina Hrvatska i Dalmacija (Croatian) Horvát Királyság és Dalmácia (Hungarian) Regnum Croatiae et Dalmatiae (Latin)
- 1102–1526
- Coat of arms (13th–early 16th century); Note: Later used for Dalmatia Coat of arms (late 15th–early 16th century); Note: Only used in Habsburg's decorative armorials

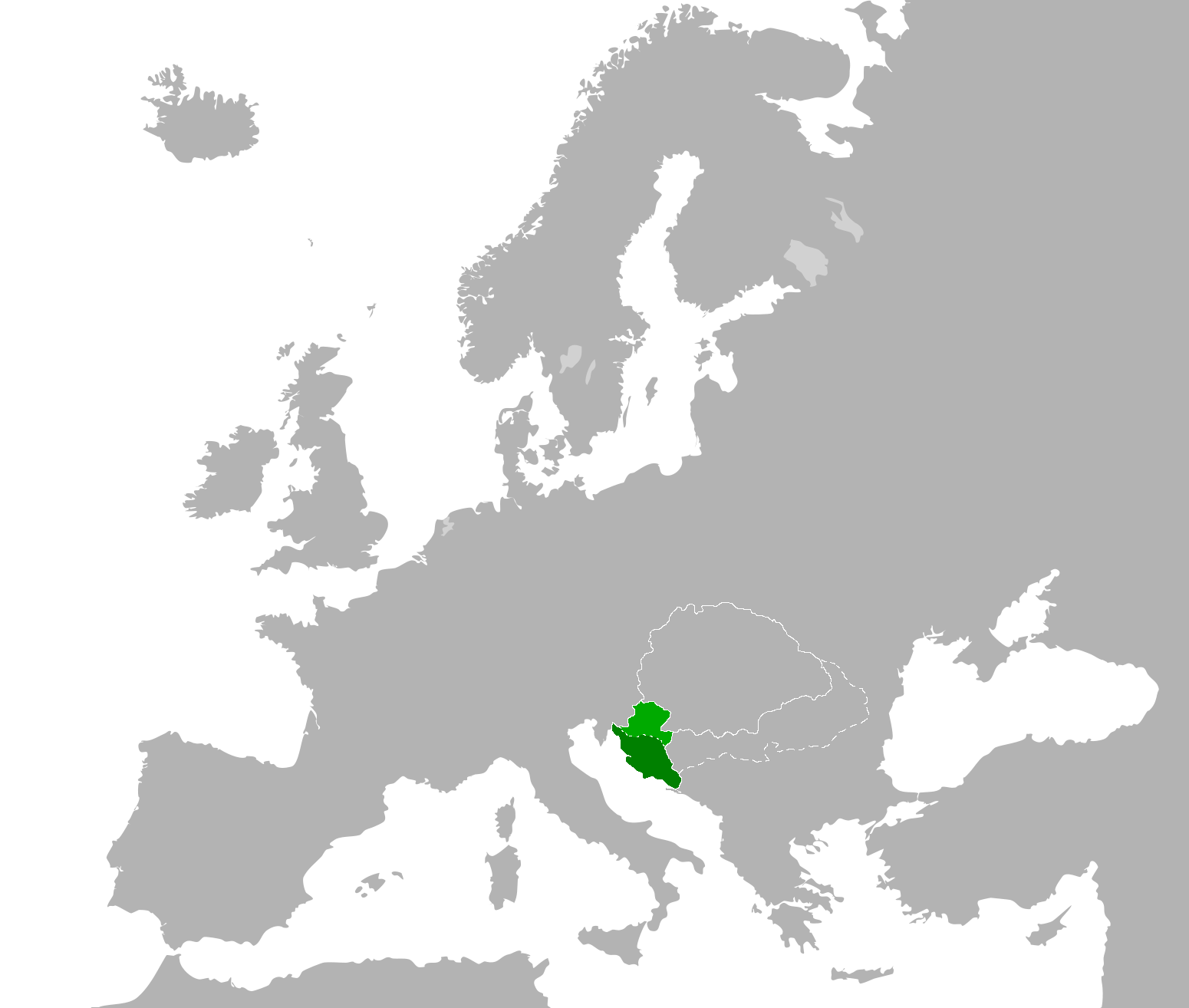
- Medieval Slavonia (green) and Kingdom of Croatia (dark green) in 1260
- Status: In personal union with Kingdom of Hungary (See historical context section)
- Capital: Biograd (until 1125); Knin (until 1522)
- Common languages: Latin, Croatian, Hungarian
- Religion: Catholic Church
- Demonyms: Croatian, Croat
- Government: Feudal Monarchy
- King
  - 1102–1116 (first): Coloman
  - 1516–1526 (last): Louis II
- Ban (Viceroy)
  - 1102–1105 (first): Ugra
  - 1522–1526 (last): Ferenc Batthyány
- Legislature: Sabor
- Historical era: Middle Ages
  - Coronation of Coloman in Biograd: 1102
  - Treaty of Zadar: 18 February 1358
  - Battle of Krbava Field: 9 September 1493
  - Fall of Knin: 29 May 1522
  - Battle of Mohács: 29 August 1526
- Currency: Frizatik (12th–13th century); Banovac (1235–1384)
Preceded by	Succeeded by
Kingdom of Croatia (925–1102)	Kingdom of Croatia (Habsburg)
- Today part of: Croatia; Bosnia and Herzegovina

The Kingdom of Croatia (Croatian: Kraljevina Hrvatska, Hrvatsko Kraljevstvo; Hungarian: Horvát királyság; Latin: Regnum Croatiae), also known with full diplomatic name Kingdom of Croatia and Dalmatia (Latin: Regnum Croatiae et Dalmatiae), entered a personal union with the Kingdom of Hungary in 1102, after a period of rule of kings from the Trpimirović and Svetoslavić dynasties and a succession crisis following the death of king Demetrius Zvonimir.

With the coronation of King Coloman of Hungary as "King of Croatia and Dalmatia" in 1102 in Biograd, the realm passed to the Árpád dynasty until 1301, when the (male) line of the dynasty died out. Then, kings from the Capetian House of Anjou, who were also cognatic descendants of the Árpád kings, ruled the kingdoms. Later centuries were characterized by conflicts with the Mongols, who sacked Zagreb in 1242, competition with Venice for control over Dalmatian coastal cities, and internal warfare among Croatian nobility. Various individuals emerged during the period, such as Paul I Šubić of Bribir, who was representing the most powerful Croatian dynasty at the time, the Šubić noble family. These powerful individuals were on occasion able to de facto secure great deal of independence for their fiefdoms. The Ottoman incursion into Europe in the 16th century significantly reduced Croatian territories and left the country weak and divided. After the death of Louis II in 1526 during the Battle of Mohács and a brief period of dynastic dispute, both crowns passed to the Austrian House of Habsburg, and the realms became part of the Habsburg monarchy.

Some of the terms of Coloman's coronation and the later status of the Croatian nobles are detailed in the Pacta Conventa, a document preserved only in transcript from the 14th century. The precise terms of this relationship became a matter of dispute in the 19th century; nonetheless, even in dynastic union with Hungary, institutions of separate Croatian statehood were maintained through the Sabor (an assembly of Croatian nobles) and the Ban (viceroy). In addition, the Croatian nobles retained their lands and titles.

== Name ==
The diplomatic name of the kingdom was "Kingdom of Croatia and Dalmatia" (Latin: Regnum Croatiae et Dalmatiae) until 1359 when a plural form "kingdoms" (Latin: regna) came into use. The change was a consequence of the victory of Louis I against the Republic of Venice and the Treaty of Zadar, by which the Venetian Republic lost its influence over Dalmatian coastal cities. However, the kingdom was still mostly referred to as the Kingdom of Croatia and Dalmatia until Venice regained the Dalmatian coast in 1409. A common synonym were "Sclavonia" (Slavonija and Slovinje) and "tota Sclauonia" (Whole Slavonia). The most common Croatian language form of the name was Hrvatska zemlja ("Croatian country" or "Croatian land").

== Background ==
=== Succession crisis ===
Kingdom of Croatia and Dalmatia during Zvonimir's reign, at the beginning of 1089, before the Battle of Gvozd Mountain in 1097.

Demetrius Zvonimir was the King of Croatia of the Svetoslavić branch of the House of Trpimirović. He began as a Ban of Croatia in the service of Peter Krešimir IV. Peter probably declared him his heir and, in 1075, Demetrius Zvonimir succeeded to the Croatian throne. Zvonimir married Helen of Hungary from the Árpád dynasty in 1063. Helen was a Hungarian princess, daughter of Béla I, and sister to King Ladislaus I of Hungary. They had a son, Radovan, who died in his late teens or early twenties. After Zvonimir's death in 1089, he was succeeded by Stephen II, last of the House of Trpimirović. Stephen's rule was relatively ineffectual and lasted less than two years. He spent most of this time in the tranquility of the monastery of St. Stephen beneath the Pines (Croatian: Sv. Stjepan pod Borovima) near Split. Stephen II died peacefully at the beginning of 1091, without leaving an heir. Since there was no living male member of the House of Trpimirović, civil war and unrest broke out in Croatia shortly afterward.

The widow of late King Zvonimir, Helen, tried to keep her power in Croatia during the succession crisis. Some Croatian nobles around Helen, possibly the Gusić family and/or Viniha from Lapčan family, contesting the succession after the death of Zvonimir, asked King Ladislaus I to help Helen and offered him the Croatian throne, which was seen as rightfully his by inheritance rights. According to some sources, several Dalmatian cities also asked King Ladislaus for assistance, and Petar Gusić with Petar de genere Cacautonem presented themselves as "White Croats" (Creates Albi), on his court. Thus the campaign launched by Ladislaus was not purely a foreign aggression nor did he appear on the Croatian throne as a conqueror, but rather as a successor by hereditary rights. In 1091 Ladislaus crossed the Drava river and conquered the entire province of Slavonia without encountering opposition, but his campaign was halted near the Iron Mountains (Mount Gvozd). Since the Croatian nobles were divided, Ladislaus had success in his campaign, yet he was not able to establish his control over entire Croatia, although the exact extent of his conquest is not known. At this time the Kingdom of Hungary was attacked by the Cumans, who were likely sent by Byzantium, so Ladislaus was forced to retreat from his campaign in Croatia. Ladislaus appointed his nephew Prince Álmos to administer the controlled area of Croatia, established the Diocese of Zagreb as a symbol of his new authority and went back to Hungary. In the midst of the war, Petar Snačić was elected king by Croatian feudal lords in 1093. Petar's seat of power was based in Knin. His rule was marked by a struggle for control of the country with Álmos, who was not able to establish his rule and was forced to withdraw to Hungary in 1095.

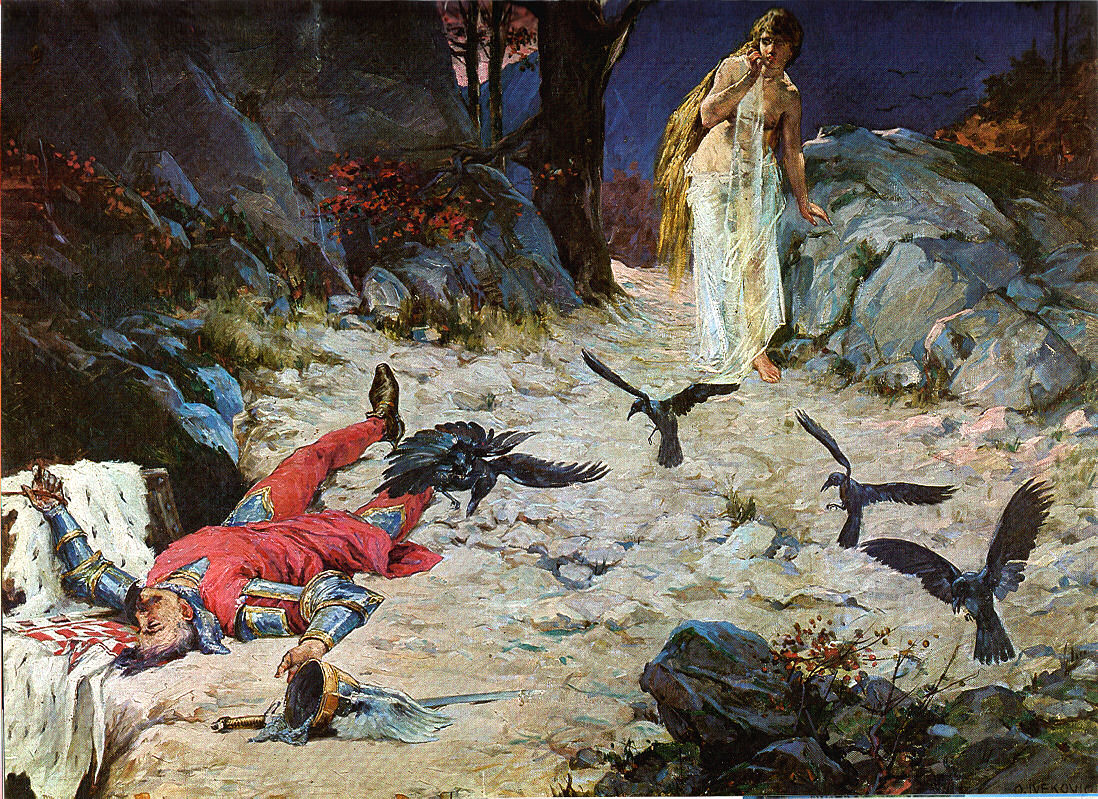
Death of the Last Croatian King (Petar Snačić), by Oton Iveković

Ladislaus died in 1095, leaving his nephew Coloman to continue the campaign. Coloman, as was the case with Ladislaus before him, was not seen as a conqueror but rather as a pretender to the Croatian throne. Coloman assembled a large army to press his claim on the throne and in 1097 defeated King Petar's troops in the Battle of Gvozd Mountain, who was killed in battle. Since the Croatians did not have a leader any more and Dalmatia had numerous fortified towns that would be difficult to defeat, negotiations started between Coloman and the Croatian feudal lords. It took several more years before the Croatian nobility recognised Coloman as the king. Coloman was crowned in Biograd in 1102 and the title now claimed by Coloman was "King of Hungary, Dalmatia, and Croatia". Some of the terms of his coronation are summarized in Pacta Conventa by which the representatives of the noble institution of twelve noble tribes of Croatia agreed to recognise Coloman as king. In return, the 12 Croatian nobles that signed the agreement retained their lands and properties and were granted exemption from tax or tributes. The nobles were to send at least ten armed horsemen each beyond the Drava River at the kings expense if his borders were attacked. Despite that Pacta Conventa is not an authentic document from 1102, there was almost certainly some kind of contract or agreement between the Croatian nobles and Coloman which regulated the relations in the same way.

=== Historical and legal context ===
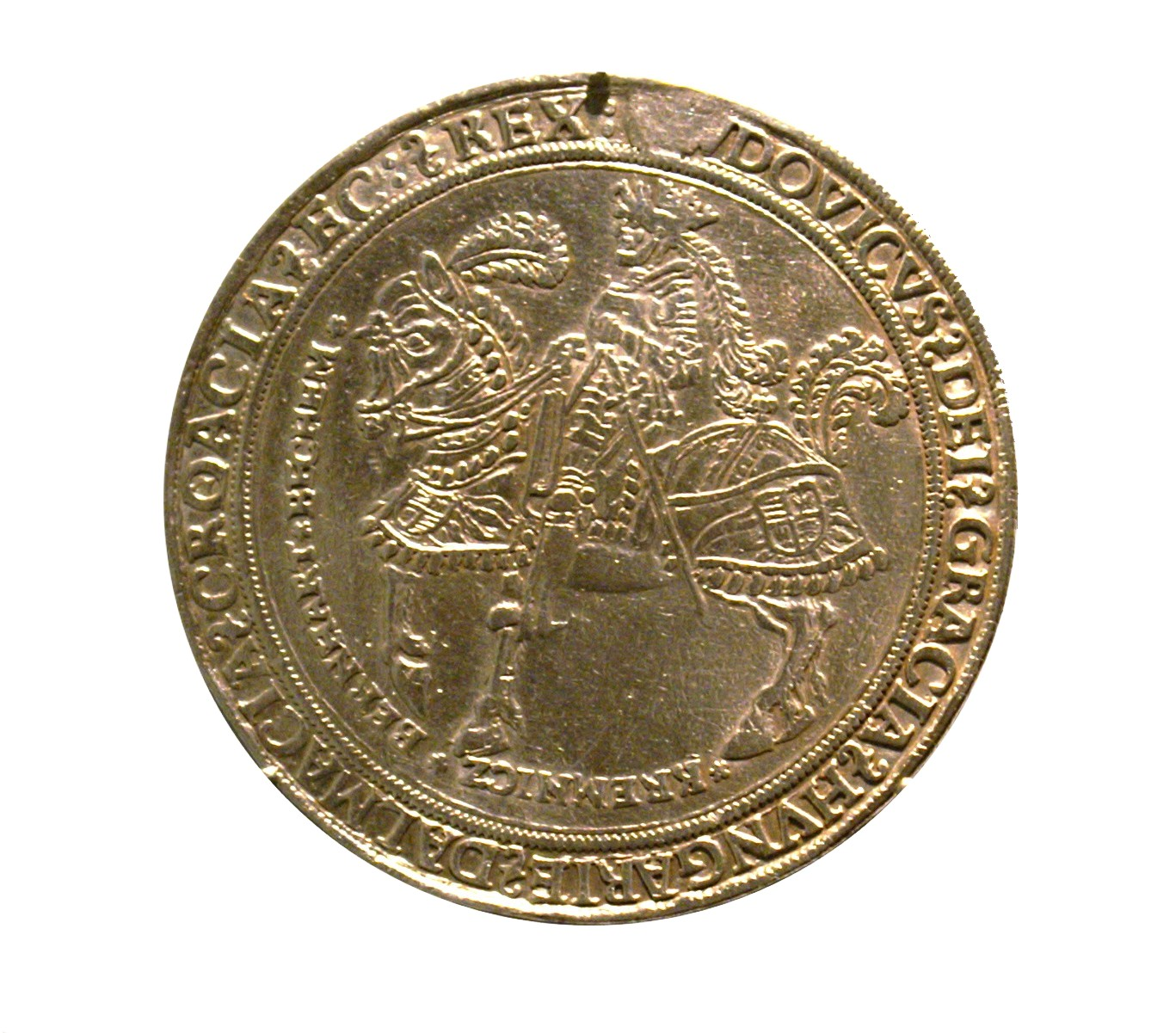
Coin of Louis II of Hungary with inscription on Latin: "Louis by the grace of God King of Hungary, Dalmatia, Croatia"

In 1102, after a succession crisis, the crown passed into the hands of the Árpád dynasty, with the crowning of King Coloman of Hungary as "King of Croatia and Dalmatia" in Biograd. The precise terms of the union between the two realms became a matter of dispute in the 19th century. The two kingdoms were united under the Árpád dynasty either by the choice of the Croatian nobility or by Hungarian force. Croatian historians hold that the union was a personal one in the form of a shared king, a view also accepted by a number of Hungarian historians, while Serbian and Hungarian nationalist historians preferred to see it as a form of annexation. The claim of a Hungarian occupation was made in the 19th century during the Hungarian national reawakening. Thus in older Hungarian historiography Coloman's coronation in Biograd was a subject of dispute and their stance was that Croatia was conquered. Although claims of this kind can also be found today, since the Croatian-Hungarian tensions are gone, it has generally been accepted that Coloman was crowned in Biograd for king. Today, Hungarian legal historians hold that the relationship of Hungary with the area of Croatia and Dalmatia in the period till 1526 and the death of Louis II was most similar to a personal union, resembling the relationship of Scotland to England.

According to the Worldmark Encyclopedia of Nations and the Grand Larousse encyclopédique, Croatia entered a personal union with Hungary in 1102, which remained the basis of the Hungarian-Croatian relationship until 1918, while Encyclopædia Britannica specified the union as a dynastic one. According to the research of the Library of Congress, Coloman crushed opposition after the death of Ladislaus I and won the crown of Dalmatia and Croatia in 1102, thus forging a link between the Croatian and Hungarian crowns that lasted until the end of World War I. Hungarian culture permeated northern Croatia, the Croatian-Hungarian border shifted often, and at times Hungary treated Croatia as a vassal state. Croatia had its own local governor, or Ban; a privileged landowning nobility; and an assembly of nobles, the Sabor. According to some historians, Croatia became part of Hungary in the late 11th and early 12th century, yet the actual nature of the relationship is difficult to define. Sometimes Croatia acted as an independent agent and at other times as a vassal of Hungary. However, Croatia retained a large degree of internal independence. The degree of Croatian autonomy fluctuated throughout the centuries as did its borders.

The alleged agreement called Pacta conventa (English: Agreed accords) or Qualiter (first word of the text) is today viewed as a 14th-century forgery by most modern Croatian historians. According to the document King Coloman and the twelve heads of the Croatian nobles made an agreement, in which Coloman recognised their autonomy and specific privileges. Although it is not an authentic document from 1102, nonetheless there was at least a non-written agreement that regulated the relations between Hungary and Croatia in approximately the same way, while the content of the alleged agreement is concordant with the reality of rule in Croatia in more than one respect.

In the Kingdom of Croatia also existed own "consuetudines antiquae Croatorum", a customary law unique to the Croatian legal tradition compared to the Hungarian one ("consuetudo Hungaricalis"). Presumably the earliest mention of the term "consuetudo Croatorum" is from 1348 when Ivan of Stipko of Bribir (i.e. Šubić) in his will left part of his estate to the Franciscan monastery of St. Mary in Bribir "despite the contrary Croatian custom, which forbids it" ("nec obstante consuetudine aliqua Chroatorum, qua prohibetur, ne quis suum Patrimonium aliis quam suis consaguineis vei propinquis alicui valeat dare"). In 1361 the ban Nicholas Szécsi was ordered by king Louis I of Hungary "to litigate according to the Hungarian customs and not the customs of the Croats and Dalmatians" ("non more aut secundum consuetudinem Croatorum an Dalmaticorum, sed iuxta legem et consuetudinem Hungaricalem iudicare deberemus"). In 1376 gathered in Knin the "antiqui homines parcium Crohacie" (Croatian elders) to interpret the "iura Crohatorum" (Croat rights), and in the 15th century was legally used in the district of Šibenik ("Sesubiecerat iurisdictioni Sibenicensi cum hoc quod gubernaretur secundum leges Croatiae"). The Croatian legal customs were preserved by Venetian Republic in Dalmatia (since 1409), and were codified in the Vinodol Statute (13th century), Poljica Statute (14-15th century), Novigrad Statute (15th century), and Vrana Statute (15th century) among others. In the Kingdom of Croatia continued to be used both Croatian and Hungarian customary law until the early 16th century when was written Tripartitum (1514) by István Werbőczy, who also noted that the "laws and legal customs (...) of the kingdoms of Dalmatia, Croatia, Slavonia and Transylvania differ in some provisions and articles from the laws and legal customs of our homeland i.e. this Kingdom of Hungary ... the Dalmatians, Croats, Slavonians and Transylvanians (...) in many legal customs use legal customs that differ greatly from ours".

The all aforementioned Croatian legal and noble institutions and privileges, and continuous mention of the Kingdom of Croatia (and Dalmatia) and Croats in official documents, preserved and consolidated the existence of a separate pre-modern Croatian nation.

== Geography and administrative organization ==
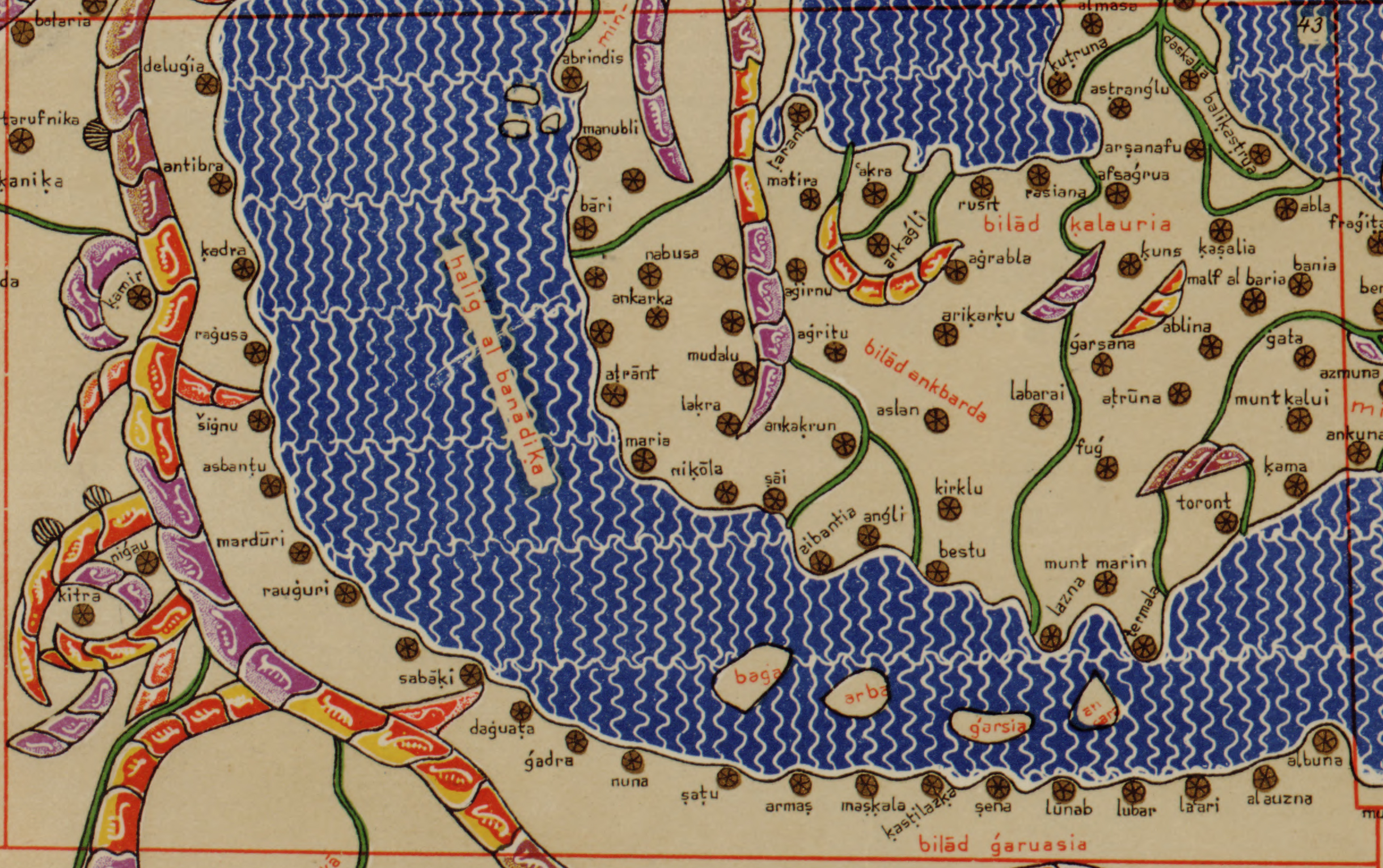
One of the oldest maps depicting Croatia, from the Tabula Rogeriana in 1154

The Kingdom of Croatia was bounded to the west by the Dalmatian coast (from the headland of the Kvarner Gulf in the north to the mouth of the Neretva in the south), bounded to the east by the courses of the Vrbas and Neretva, to the south by the lower Neretva, and to the north by the Gvozd Mountain and river Kupa. The territory between Dalmatia and the Neretva, western Hum, was not always in Croatia's possession. The term "Dalmatia" referred to several coastal cities and islands, at times used as a synonym of Croatia, and was to spread further inland only with the expansion of Venice in the 15th century. In the second half of the 15th and early 16th century borders of Croatia spread north and included the territory of the Zagreb county and its surroundings, that have already been under the same administration.

Croatia was ruled by a deputy for the king, a governor called a ban. After the succession of Emeric in 1196, his younger brother Andrew II became Duke of Croatia and Dalmatia in 1198, following a brief skirmish between them. Thus from 1198 Croatia and Slavonia were under the Dukes of Croatia, who ran their duchy, still known as the Kingdom of Croatia, as semi-independent rulers. Under the duke there also stood a ban who was usually a major nobleman, sometimes of Croatian origin and sometimes of Hungarian. A single ban governed all Croatian provinces until 1225 when the territory under ban's rule was divided between two bans: the Ban of Croatia and Dalmatia and the Ban of Slavonia. The positions were intermittently held by the same person after 1345, and officially merged back into one by 1476. The territory of Croatia was divided into counties (Croatian: županije), each under a count (župan). The Croatian counts were local nobles in hereditary succession ruling as they had before 1102, under the customary law of Croatia. In Church affairs, Croatia south of the Gvozd mountain was under the jurisdiction of the Archbishop of Split, while Slavonia was under the Archbishop of Kalocsa.

== History ==
=== Struggle with Venice and Byzantium ===
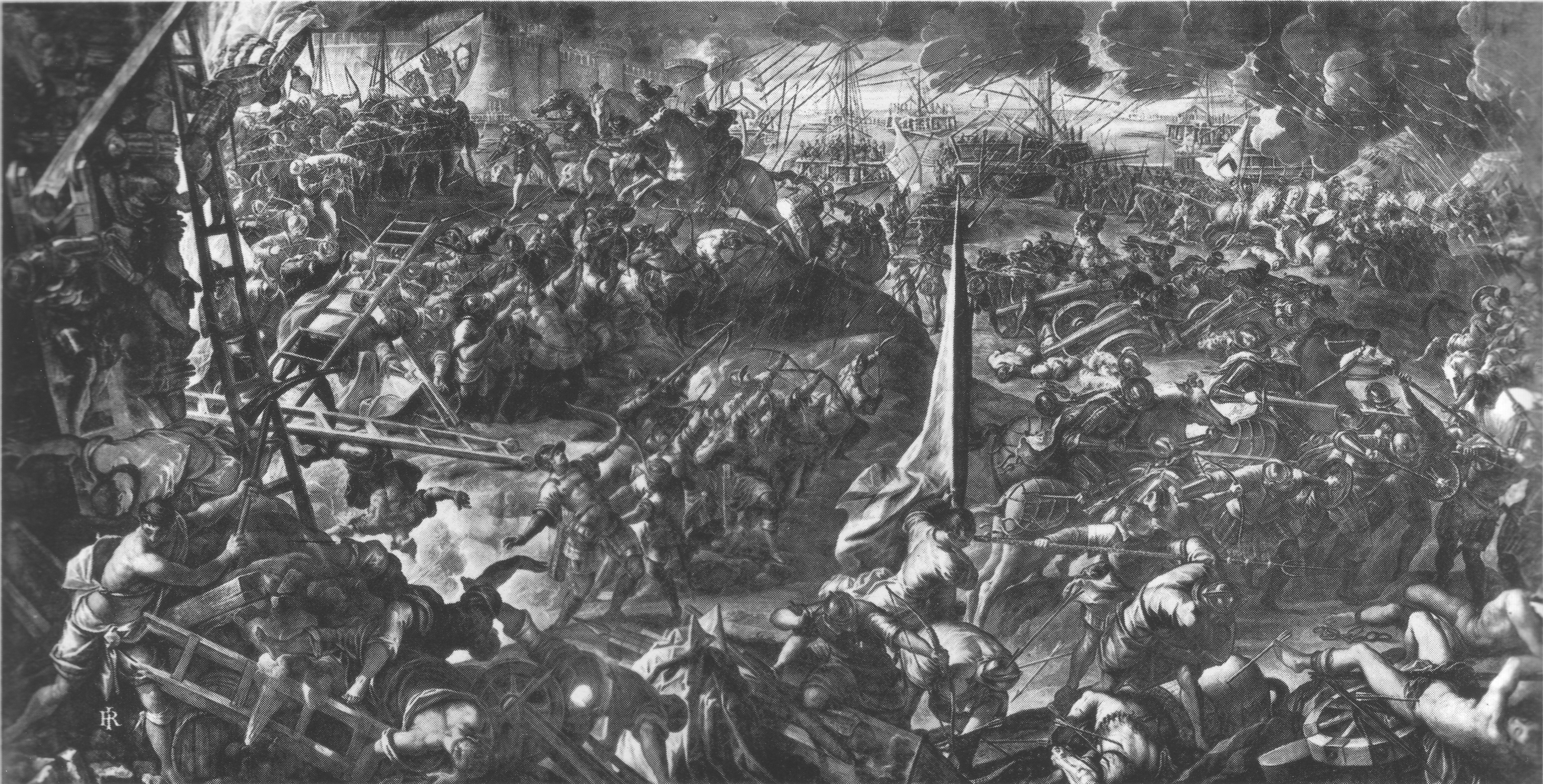
Siege of Zadar in 1202 by the Crusaders and Venetians.

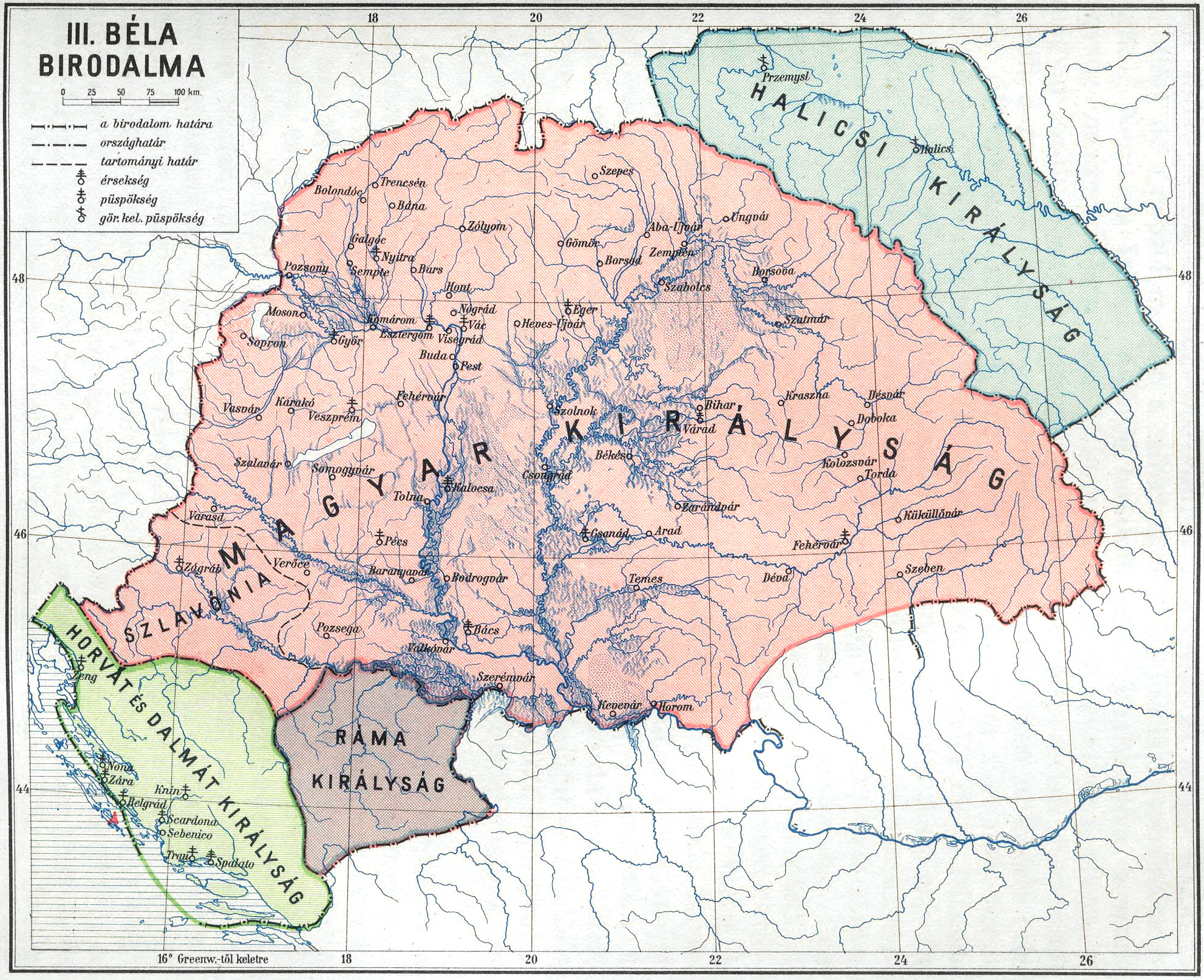
Kingdom of Croatia and Dalmatia in the late 12th century (light green).

By 1107 King Coloman controlled most of former Byzantine coastal cities in Dalmatia. Since those cities were important, Hungarians and Croats often fought with Venice and the Byzantines for the region. In 1116, after the death of Coloman, Venice attacked the Dalmatian coast, defeated the army of Croatian Ban Cledin and seized Biograd, Split, Trogir, Šibenik, Zadar and several islands. King Stephen II, Coloman's successor, unsuccessfully tried to regain the lost cities in 1117, although the Doge of Venice Ordelafo Faliero was killed in a battle near Zadar. A five-year truce was signed, confirming the status quo. In 1124 Stephen II again attacked the Venetian holdings and regained Biograd, Split, Šibenik and Trogir, but Zadar and the islands remained under Venetian control. However, in 1125 Doge Domenico Michele reconquered those cities and razed Biograd. In 1131 Béla II succeeded to the throne and in 1133 won back the lost cities except Zadar. In 1167 a part of Croatia south of Krka River, as well as Bosnia, was conquered by the Byzantines and remained under their control until the death of Emperor Manuel I Komnenos in 1180, when the Byzantine Empire relinquished the acquired lands. After 1180 area under the administration of ban increased, but his domain and scope of activities were not yet fully formulated.

Following the death of Emperor Manuel I Komnenos the Byzantine Empire was no longer able to maintain its power consistently in Dalmatia. Soon Zadar rebelled against Venice and became a constant battleground until 1202 when, during the Fourth Crusade, the Venetians under Doge Enrico Dandolo and the Crusaders sacked Zadar (Zara), despite the fact that King Emeric pledged himself to join the Crusade. It was the first attack against a Catholic city by the Crusaders. Venice demanded this as a compensation for their transport further east towards Constantinople, where they later founded the Latin Empire. Hostilities with Venice continued until 1216 during the reign of King Andrew II, who used the Venetian fleet to join the Fifth Crusade.

=== Feudalisation and relations between nobles ===
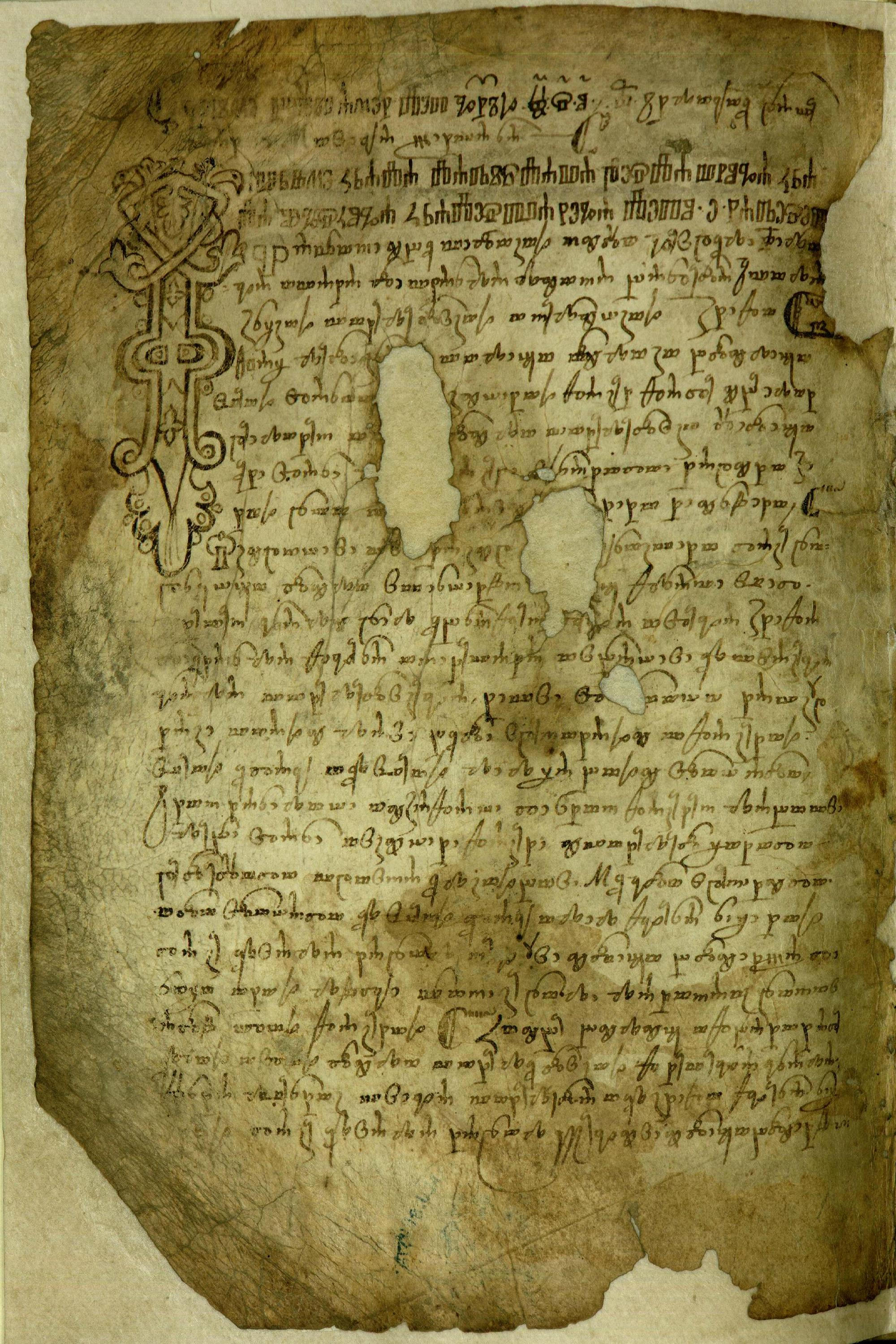
Law codex of Vinodol, a Croatian law code in Glagolitic script from 1288.

In the 12th century, under the influence of the feudal system that flourished in medieval Europe and prevailed in Hungary and Croatia, a layer of powerful noble families was formed in Croatia. Those families were mostly descendants of the original twelve noble Croatian tribes. Nobility created by the monarchs or based upon royal service never existed in Croatia. Those nobles held and administered whole counties, presided over local courts and enforced their decisions, therefore local population was entirely separated from any state organisation. Most prominent Croatian noble families of the 12th and early 13th century were the Šubić (or Princes of Bribir), divided among various branches of the family and ruling over inland Dalmatia with their seat in Bribir; the Babonić in western Slavonia and along the right bank of the Kupa River; the Kačić between the Cetina and Neretva rivers with their seat in Omiš, known for practicing piracy; and the Frankopan (then known as the Princes of Krk), ruling over the island of Krk, Kvarner and the County of Modruš in northern Lika. Besides these main noble families, there were other less powerful ones, such as the families of Gusić (later with prominent branch Kurjaković), Kukar, Lapčan and Karinjan, Mogorović, and Tugomirić.

During this period and as result of the Second Crusade (1145–1149), the Knights Templar and the Knights Hospitaller gained considerable property and assets in Croatia. The first grants in favor of the Christian orders were given by Bosnian Ban Borić. By the end of the 12th century the Templars had possessions in Vrana, Senj, Nova Ves near Zagreb, etc.

In 1221 a war broke out between Domald, who was then Prince of Split and Count of Cetina, and the Šubić family over the ownership of Split. Domald's family ties are unknown, but he was probably from the Snačić or the Kačić family. Domald also held Šibenik and Klis fortress and briefly took Zadar from Venice in 1209. The citizens of Split expelled Domald in 1221 and elected Višan Šubić from Zvonigrad near Knin as their prince. Although the Šubić family was victorious, another war started among its members, Gregory III Šubić of Bribir and Višan. Gregory Šubić won, executed Višan and took his lands, thus securing supremacy in the Šubić family. Domald was still in possession of Klis and had ambitions to retake Split. In the course of the war Domald lost Klis and then allied himself with the Kačić family. In 1229 Domald managed to defeat Gregory's deputy in Split and was re-elected as the prince of Split. However, by 1231 Gregory returned to his position in Split. After Gregory died Domald took advantage of the new situation and for the second time reclaimed Split in 1235, but lost it 2 years after to Gregory's son Marko I Šubić of Bribir. War with Domald was finally over when Stjepko Šubić defeated and captured him in Klis.

Croatia and Slavonia remained decentralized under local nobles throughout the 13th century, unlike the Hungarian nobles that rebelled against King Andrew II. The King was forced to issue a golden bull in 1222 defining the rights of the Hungarian nobility and granting them privileges such as tax exemption and the right to disobey the King. The Croatian nobles already enjoyed most of the privileges that Andrew II granted.

=== Mongol invasion ===
During the rule of Béla IV the Mongols (or Tatars), having conquered Kyiv and south Rus, invaded Hungary in 1241. In the Battle of Mohi on the Sajó River on 11 April 1241 the Mongols wiped out the Hungarian army. Coloman, brother of King Béla, was severely wounded and was taken south to Croatia, where he died of his wounds. Batu Khan sent his cousin Kadan with an army of 10,000–20,000 to pursue King Béla, who fled to Croatia.

In 1242 the Mongols crossed the Drava river and started plundering the Slavonian counties of Požega and Križevci. They sacked the towns of Čazma and Zagreb, whose cathedral was burned. The nobility, together with King Béla, moved south to the fortress of Klis, Split, Trogir and the surrounding islands. In March 1242 the Mongols were near Split and started attacking Klis, since they thought King Béla, who was at the time in Trogir, was hiding there, but failed to capture its fortress.

Soon came the news of the death of Ögedei Khan in Karakorum. To be in on the action of electing a new khan, the Mongols turned back. One group returned east through Zeta, Serbia, and Bulgaria, all of which were looted as they passed through, while the second one plundered the area of Dubrovnik and burned the town of Kotor.

After the Mongols left Croatia, its land was devastated and a huge famine broke out. The invasion of Mongols showed that only fortified cities could provide protection against them. Since the Mongols still held much of Eastern Europe, work began on the construction of defence systems, making new fortifications and reinforcing or repairing existing ones. The fortified town of Medvedgrad was built on the Medvednica mountain above Zagreb, as well as Garić, Lipovac, Okić, Kalnik, etc. On 16 November 1242 the king issued a Golden Bull to the citizens of Gradec (today part of Zagreb), by which it was proclaimed a free royal city. Nobles were allowed to build castles on their lands and increase the size of their armies, making them even more independent.

=== 13th century civil war ===
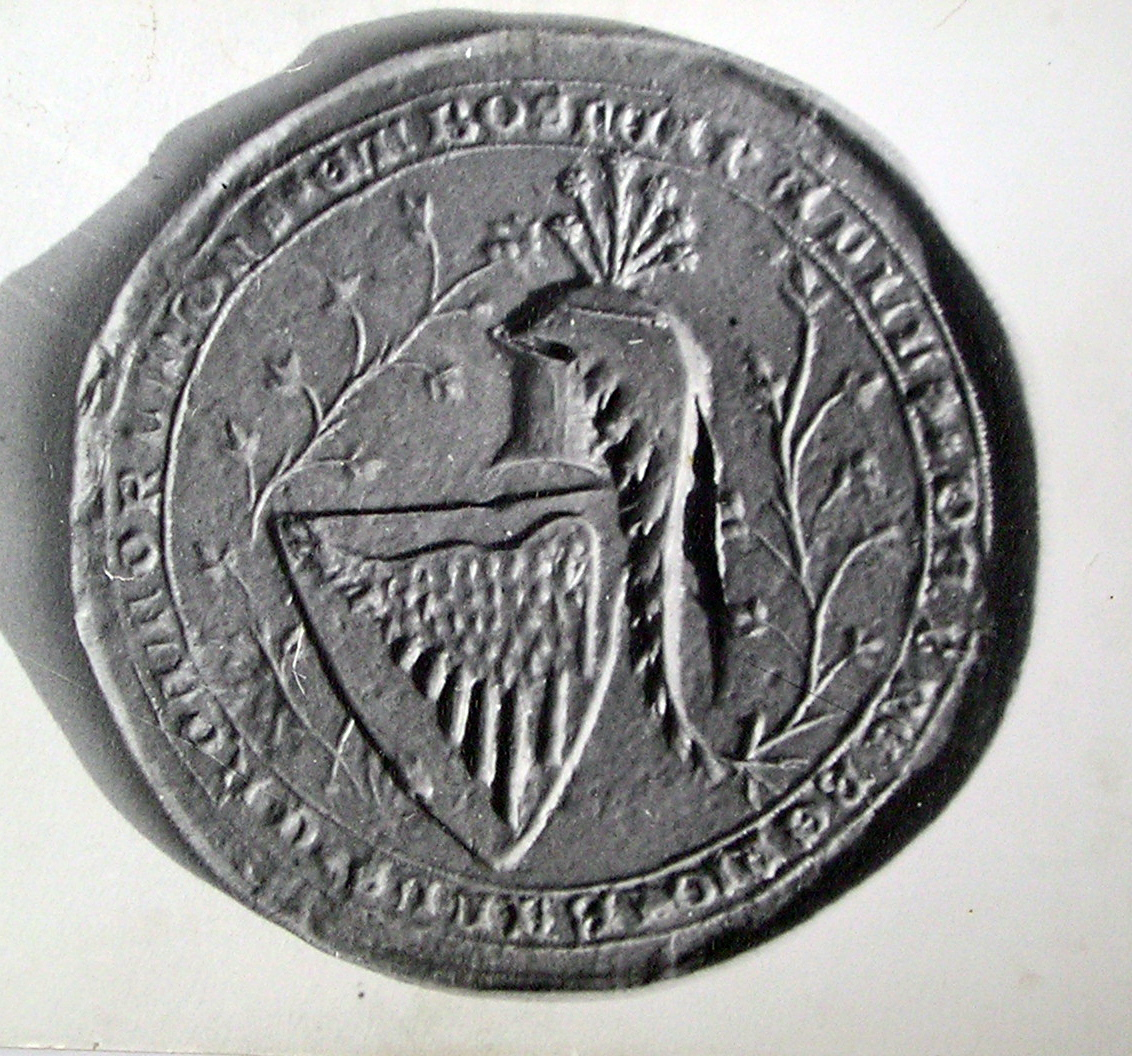
Seal of Paul I Šubić of Bribir, "Paulus de Breberio banus Croatorum D[omi]n[u]s et Bosnae" (Paul of Bribir, Ban of the Croats and Lord of Bosnia).

The Mongol invasion temporarily stopped internal warfare among the nobles, but right after they left in the early 1240s a civil war broke out in Croatia. The cause of the war was the possession of Ostrog village, that both Split and Trogir claimed as theirs and which was in 1242 confirmed by King Béla IV to Trogir with a special charter. Trogir had the support of the King and the Šubić family, with Stjepko Šubić its leader, while Split found allies among the Kačić family, Andrew of Hum and Bosnian Ban Matej Ninoslav. In 1244 Split elected Ninoslav as its prince, and in the same year Ninoslav launched an attack on Trogir, but failed to take the city. After Ninoslav returned to Bosnia, a large army commanded by Slavonian Ban Denis Türje, Stjepko Šubić and Daniel Šubić was sent against Split, which immediately surrendered. Peace was signed on 19 July 1244. A second army led by King Béla IV breached into Bosnia and forced Ban Matej Ninoslav to sign a peace treaty on 20 July 1244. To prevent further wars among the Dalmatian coastal cities, King Béla IV transferred the election of their governors, that were previously done by cities themselves, to the Ban of Croatia. The Šubić family was dissatisfied with this decision, as they had previously governed most of the coastal cities.

The later kings sought to restore their influence by giving certain privileges to the towns, making them free royal cities, thus separating them from the authority of the local nobles. Varaždin acquired the status of a free city in 1220, Vukovar in 1231 and Virovitica in 1234 from King Andrew II. Petrinja gained that status in 1240, Gradec (excluding Kaptol, where the bishop of Zagreb resided, that was under its own administration) in 1242, Samobor in 1242, Križevci in 1252, and Jastrebarsko in 1257. Free cities elected their own councils, had their own administration and courts, collected their own taxes and managed their economies and trade.

However, local nobles continued to strengthen. The weakening of royal authority allowed the Šubić family to restore their former role in the coastal cities. In the 1270s they regained Trogir, Split and Šibenik. In 1274 Paul I Šubić of Bribir (Croatian: Pavao I Šubić Bribirski) became the head of the family and was soon named the Ban of Croatia and Dalmatia, while his brothers were princes of the leading Dalmatian cities, Mladen I Šubić of Split, and George I Šubić of Trogir and Šibenik. In 1280 Venice attacked the coastal holdings of the Kačić family and captured Omiš. Paul Šubić used the decline of the Kačići and seized the mainland holdings between the Neretva and Cetina rivers.

=== Dynastic struggles and the Šubić family ===
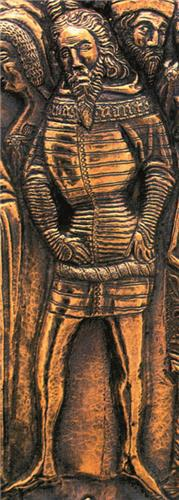
Depiction of Paul I Šubić on the Chest of Saint Simeon in Zadar.

In 1290 King Ladislaus IV died, leaving no sons, and a war of succession broke out between Andrew III from the Árpád dynasty and Charles Martel of Anjou from the House of Anjou. Croatian Ban Paul Šubić and most of the Croatian nobility supported Charles Martel, while most of the Hungarian nobles supported Andrew III. The Babonić family was initially on the Anjou side, but soon came out for Andrew III. To retain Croatian support, father of Charles Martel, Charles II of Naples, awarded in the name of his son all lands from the Gvozd Mountain to the Neretva River hereditarily to Paul Šubić. The position of the ban was thus made hereditary for the Šubić family, while the local Croatian nobles became vassals of Paul and his descendants. In response Andrew III also issued a charter naming Paul a hereditary Croatian ban. As a result of this bidding for support and the absence of central power in the midst of a civil war, the Šubić family became the most powerful family in Croatia.

In Zagreb, the bishop's town, Kaptol, supported Charles Martel, while Gradec supported Andrew, which led to bitter fighting in the area. After Charles Martel died in 1295 his rights to the throne passed to his son, Charles I (also known as Charles Robert). Croatian and Hungarian nobles eventually accepted Andrew III as King, but a new revolt started when in 1299 Andrew named his uncle, Albertino Morosini as heir, since he had no sons. Paul sent his brother, George I Šubić, to Rome to gain papal approval for their requests and bring Charles I to Croatia, where he arrived in August 1300. Andrew III died in January 1301 and brought the Árpád dynasty to an end. Ban Paul Šubić accompanied Charles I to Zagreb, where he was recognized as king. In March 1301 the Archbishop crowned him with a provisional crown King of Hungary and Croatia in Esztergom. So the act was not performed with the Holy Crown of Hungary in Székesfehérvár as it was required by custom.

The dominion of Paul I Šubić in 1312 (Croatia, Bosnia, and Hum), shortly after the capture of Zadar from Venice.

The privileges that Paul Šubić gained during the succession crisis were confirmed and his family gained hereditary banship. Although the Croatian nobles recognized Charles I, a part of the Hungarian nobles refused to do so and opted for Wenceslaus, the son of Wenceslaus II, King of Bohemia, who was in 1301 crowned King of Hungary in Székesfehérvár. Civil war followed in Hungary, but it did not affect Croatia, which was under the firm authority of Paul Šubić. Earlier in 1299 Paul gained control over Bosnia, so his title was from then "Ban of the Croats and Lord of Bosnia" (Latin: Banus Croatorum Dominus et Bosnae). He gave his brother Mladen I Šubić the title of Ban of Bosnia. At that time the power of Paul extended from Gvozd to the Neretva, and from the Adriatic coast to the Bosna River, and only the city of Zadar remained outside his realm and under the rule of Venice. In 1304 Ban Mladen I was killed in Bosnia. Paul carried out a campaign against Bosnia to reaffirm his authority, bringing more of its lands under his rule, as Paul referred to himself from 1305 as "lord of all Bosnia" (Latin: totius Bosniae dominus). He appointed his second son, Mladen II, Ban of Bosnia, and in 1305 his third son, Paul II, became the Prince of Split.

Paul issued his own money and was for all practical purposes an independent ruler. In 1311 Paul triggered a successful rebellion in Zadar against Venetian rule. War with Venice continued after Paul's death on 1 May 1312, who was succeeded by his son Mladen II. With Paul's death began a gradual decline of the Bribir Princes. Venice eventually restored their rule in Zadar in 1313. In 1322 another civil war in Croatia started, culminating in the Battle of Bliska when Mladen II and his allies were defeated by a coalition of Croatian noblemen, including his brother Paul II, and coastal towns under the command of John Babonić, the Ban of Slavonia. A council in Knin was convened by the King where John Babonić was named Ban of Croatia and Dalmatia, ending the hereditary banship of the Šubić family. Their holdings were reduced and split between Mladen's brothers. Paul II held Bribir and Ostrovica, while George II held Klis, Skradin and Omiš. After the decline of the Šubić family, Ivan Nelipić had risen to become the dominant figure in Croatia. He seized the royal city of Knin, which led to the removal of John Babonić from his banship and the appointment of Nicholas Felsőlendvai and later Mikcs Ákos, whose army was defeated in 1326 by Ivan Nelipić. Thus all of Croatia from Lika and Krbava to the Cetina River was in fact outside the king's authority. Nelipić had tense relations with the Šubići and had frequent conflicts with them. During these conflicts Venice took control over Split in 1327 and Nin in 1329, gaining most of the coast from Zrmanja River to the mouth of the Cetina. At the same time, Stephen II Kotromanić, Ban of Bosnia, annexed the territory between Cetina and Neretva, as well as Imotski, Duvno, Livno i Glamoč. Over the remainder of Croatia Ivan Nelipić ruled independently from Knin until his death in 1344. Following that Louis I restored royal power in Croatia and pacified the country by the end of 1345. Nicholas Hahót was the first appointed royal official in decades, who styled himself Ban of Slavonia, Croatia and Dalmatia, merging the two positions and extending his influence to the Croatian territories as well to represent the royal authority.

=== Territorial changes in Dalmatia ===
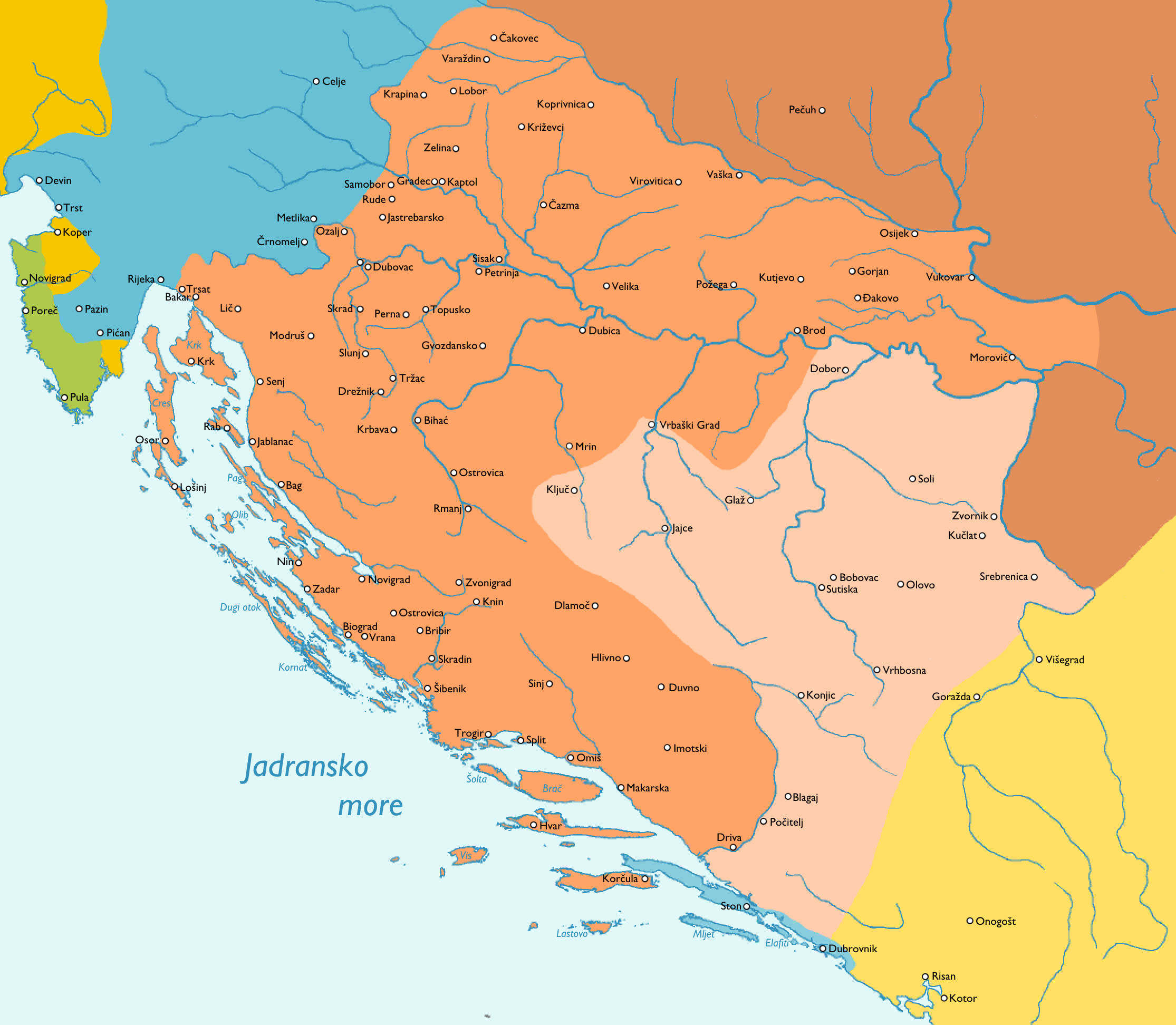
Croatia after the Treaty of Zadar (1358).

In 1345 Zadar again rebelled against Venice, but after a lengthy siege in late 1346 the Venetians regained the city. In retaliation for the rebellion Venice destroyed Zadar's sea walls, confiscated weapons from its citizens and sent a Venetian to be the town's governor. King Louis I of Hungary signed an eight-year peace treaty with Venice in 1348. In 1356, after the end of the peace treaty, King Louis invaded Venetian territories without a former declaration of war. The Croatian army was led by Ban John Csúz of Ludbreg. Split, Trogir, and Šibenik soon got rid of the Venetian governors, while Zadar fell after a short siege. As Louis at the same time fought successfully in northern Italy, Venice was forced to sign the Treaty of Zadar on 18 February 1358.

With the treaty, King Louis gained power over the entire area of Dalmatia, from the island of Cres to Durrës in Albania, including Dubrovnik (Ragusa), which acted as an independent unit. The Doge of Venice had to renounce its title "Duke of Croatia and Dalmatia". After this the entire Croatian territory was integrated under one administration and under the authority of the Ban of Croatia and Dalmatia. As a result, the economy of Croatia flourished in the late 14th century, especially in cities on the eastern Adriatic coast. New royal towns were established on trade routes, richer merchants' increased dominance over towns, and new conditions marked the beginning of cultural integration between coastal and continental Croatia.

=== Anti-court movement ===
Following the death of Louis I in 1382 his wife Elizabeth of Bosnia acted as regent of the eleven-year-old Queen Mary. Her accession was denied by some noblemen who considered that King Charles III of Naples was the lawful heir to the throne. In Croatia John of Palisna, prior of Vrana, was the first to rise against Elizabeth. He was mainly opposed to the centralizing policy which Elizabeth's husband had enforced. He was accompanied by Tvrtko I of Bosnia, who was crowned as King of Bosnia in 1371. John was ultimately defeated by Elizabeth's army that seized his town of Varna and forced him to flee to Bosnia. After a brief period of peace a new movement against Queen Mary and Elizabeth emerged in 1385 that was led by John Horvat, Ban of Macsó, and his brother Paul Horvat, Bishop of Zagreb.

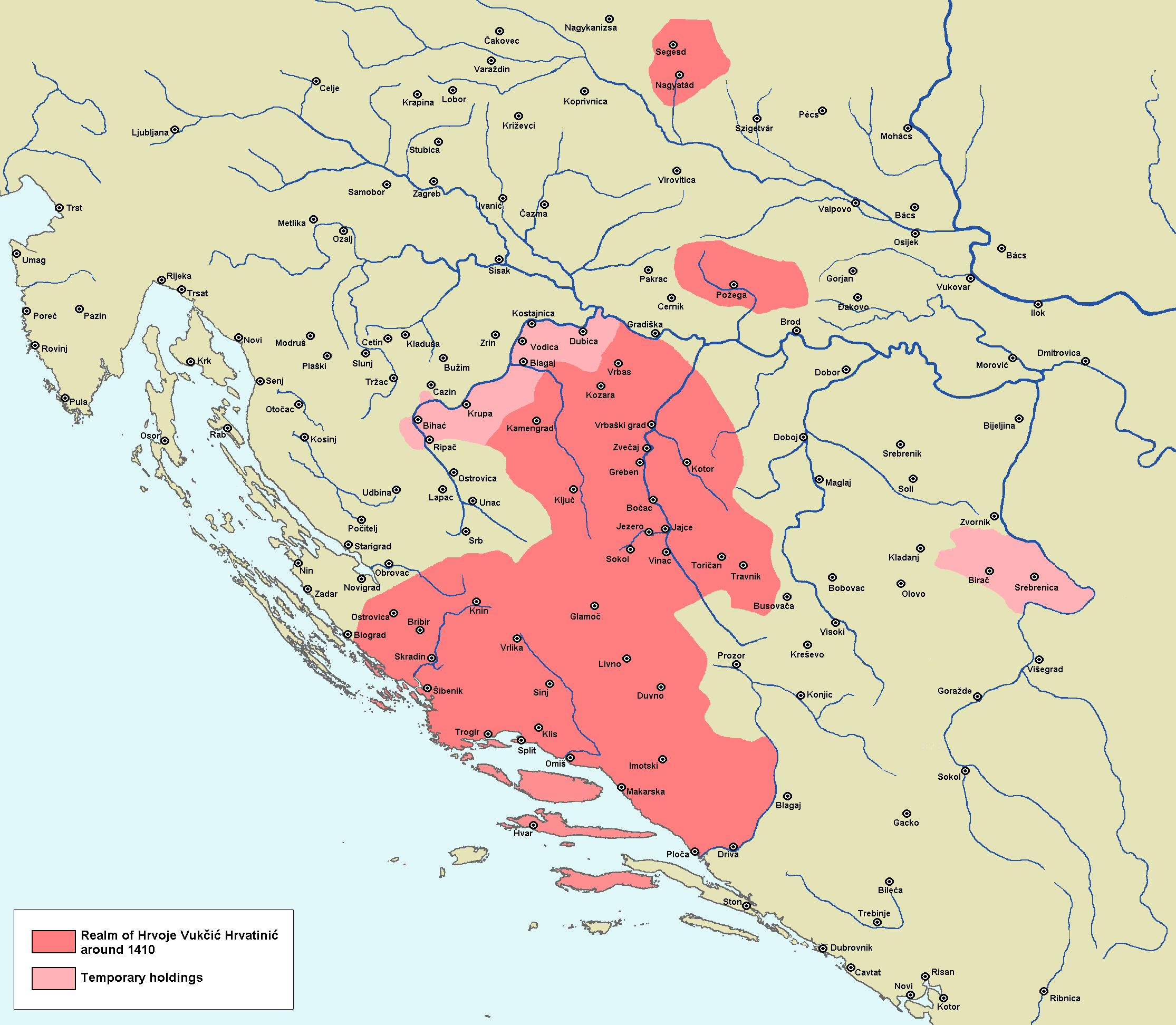
Realm of Hrvoje Vukčić Hrvatinić in the early 15th century.

The two brothers were joined by John of Palisna, who had been named Ban of Croatia, Dalmatia, and Slavonia in 1385 by Charles III. They assisted Charles in deposing Queen Mary who renounced the crown without resistance in late 1385, but Elizabeth soon had him murdered in February 1386. The Horvat brothers rose up in open rebellion on behalf of the murdered king's son, Ladislaus of Naples. On 25 July 1386 they attacked Queen Mary, Elizabeth and their retinue at Gorjani and captured the queens. Mary and her mother were imprisoned and held in captivity at the bishop of Zagreb's castle of Gomnec. Elizabeth and Mary were soon sent to Novigrad Castle, with John of Palisna as their new jailer. Elizabeth was tried and found guilty of inciting Charles' murder. In January 1387 Sigismund of Luxemburg, husband of Queen Mary, marched towards Novigrad to rescue the queens. When news of Sigismund's approach reached Novigrad, Elizabeth was strangled in her prison in Mary's presence. As the throne could no longer be left vacant, Sigismund was crowned king on 31 March 1387 at Székesfehérvár.

Sigismund's ally Ivan V Frankopan laid siege to Novigrad Castle with the assistance of a Venetian fleet. They captured the castle on 4 June 1387 and released Mary from captivity. She remained Sigismund's co-ruler until the end of her life, but her influence was minimal. In the meantime King Tvrtko I of Bosnia, an ally of the Horvat brothers, made them governors of Usora. The Horvat brothers were also aided by Grand Duke of Bosnia, Hrvoje Vukčić Hrvatinić. Tvrtko and his allies managed to acquire most of Croatia and Dalmatia between 1387 and 1390, and all efforts of Sigismund to take these back ended in failure. In 1390 Tvrtko began to call himself "King of Croatia and Dalmatia" and awarded Hrvoje with acquired Dalmatian possessions. Tvrtko died in March 1391 and John of Palisna died a few weeks later. Hrvoje Vukčić Hrvatinić was left the strongest nobleman in Bosnia after the death of King Tvrtko. Same year, Ladislaus appointed him as his deputy in Dalmatia, and also granted him a title of Duke of Split, later Herzog of Split, affirming his possessions on the islands of Brač, Hvar and Korčula. At the peak of his power Hrvoje was styled Grand Duke of Bosnia, Knyaz of Donji Kraji, Hezog of Split.

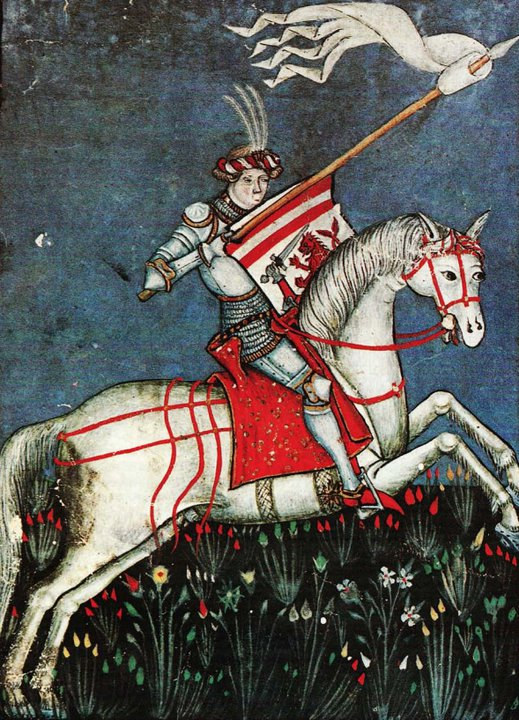
Ladislaus Viceroy in Croatia and Herzog of Split, Hrvoje Vukčić Hrvatinić, Grand Duke of Bosnia as depicted in Hrvoje's Missal (1404)

The situation changed in 1393, when Tvrtko's successor, Stephen Dabiša, made peace with Sigismund. He returned Tvrtko's recent acquisitions, but was allowed to keep the territories in western Bosnia that had been conquered in 1385. Hrvoje Vukčić also submitted in 1393. In July 1394 Sigismund took Dobor in Bosnia and captured John Horvat, thus ending the uprising of the Horvats. On Queen Mary's orders, as a revenge of her mother's death, John was tortured to death in Pécs.

After the death of Stephen Dabiša his widow Jelena Gruba was elected as queen. Hrvoje Vukčić again actively opposed to Sigismund and proclaimed his support for Ladislaus of Naples. In an attempt to reconcile with the rebellious nobility, Sigismund summoned a council at Križevci in Croatia on 27 February 1397 to which Stephen II Lackfi, who was appointed by Ladislaus as his deputy for Croatia, was invited on a safe-conduct. At the gathering Lackfi, his nephew Andrew and the supporting nobility were murdered, which set off a new uprising in the name of Ladislaus. This uprising was led by Hrvoje Vukčić, who took a very active role and was able to extend his own authority. The council of Križevci later became known as the "Bloody Sabor of Križevci".

Sigismund had an unsuccessful campaign against the Kingdom of Bosnia in 1398, after which new Bosnian King Stephen Ostoja and Hrvoje moved onto the offensive. Zadar submitted to Hrvoje in 1401 and with the help of Ivaniš Nelipčić, who controlled most of the Cetina county, Hrvoje gained control over Split in 1403. During these years Sigismund lost support from the Frankopans, but retained the loyalty of Kurjakovići (branch of Gusić's), the Berislavići and the princes of Zrin. However, Ladislaus' passivity and hesitation to move towards Buda distressed his followers, so Sigismund offered an amnesty to all those who had opposed him. Many Hungarian and Croatian nobles, including the Frankopans, accepted it and sided with Sigismund.

Due to a conflict with Hrvoje Vukčić, Bosnian nobility ousted Stephen Ostoja in 1404 and put on the throne Tvrtko II who reigned as Hrvoje's puppet king. Ostoja fled to Hungary and sided with Sigismund. Hrvoje was able to withstand several Sigismund's military interventions until 1408 when the Bosnian nobility was severely defeated in the Battle of Dobor. In January 1409 it was announced that Hrvoje had submitted to Sigismund and that Ostoja was restored to the Bosnian throne. By this Sigismund had put an end to the unrest in Hungary, Bosnia and Croatia. Eventually in 1409 Ladislaus sold his rights in Dalmatia to Venice for 100,000 ducats in an attempt to gain allies in the upcoming war against the Republic of Florence.

=== Ottoman wars ===
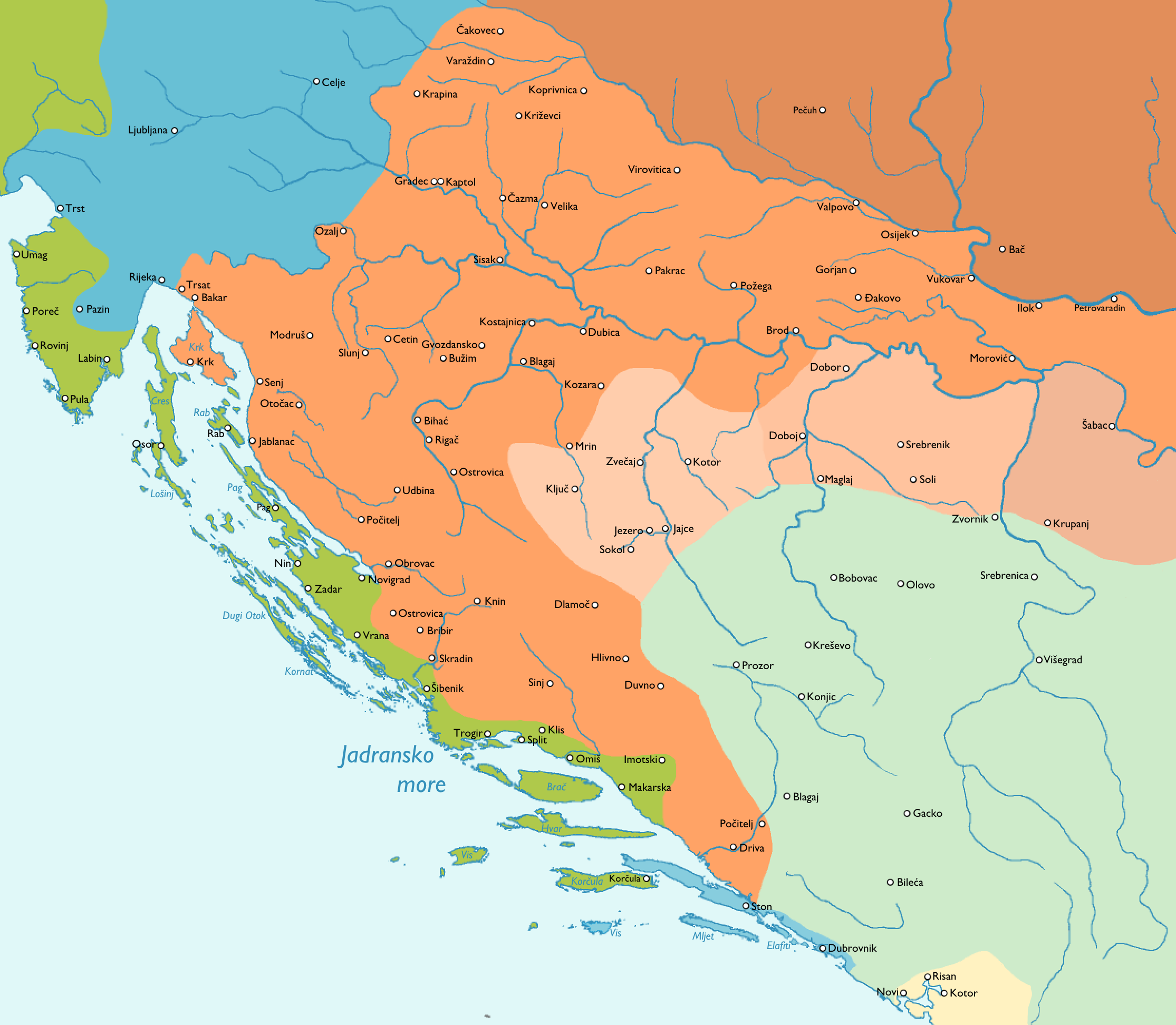
Croatian Kingdom in 1469.

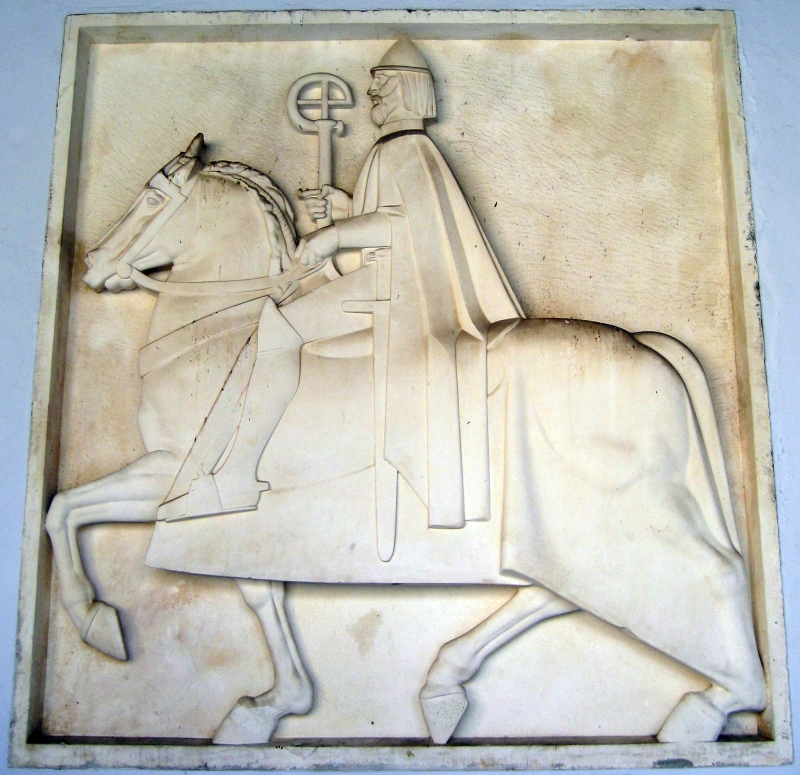
Petar Berislavić monument in Trogir.

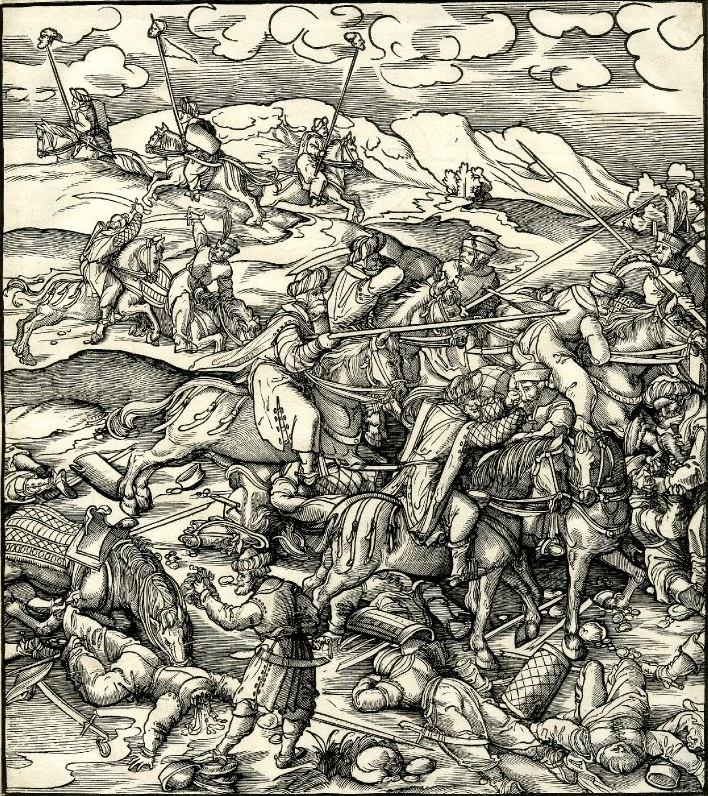
Battle of Krbava Field in 1493.

Croatia and Ottoman expansion in the region in 1500.

After the conquest of the Byzantine Empire in 1453 the Ottomans quickly expanded westward and also threatened the Kingdom of Croatia. Following the fall of the Kingdom of Bosnia in 1463, King Matthias Corvinus strengthened the defense system by establishing the Banate of Jajce and Banate of Srebrenik. Although the Ottomans had trouble in breaching the defense lines, they regularly conducted plundering raids into Croatia and southern Hungary. During one such raid in 1463 Croatian Ban Pavao Špirančić was captured in Senj. The Ottoman Empire quickly expanded to the southern areas, where they conquered large parts of Herzegovina in 1482 and Croatian strongholds in the Neretva valley.

First major Croatian victory over the Ottomans was achieved by Count Petar Zrinski in 1478 near Glina. In 1483 an army led by Croatian Ban Matthias Geréb and the Frankopans defeated a force of around 7,000 Ottoman cavalry (known as the Akıncı) at the Battle of Una River crossing near modern-day Novi Grad. The same year a peace treaty was signed that spared Croatia from larger Ottoman raids. Local conflicts on the border did continue, but with lesser intensity.

The truce ended with the death of Matthias Corvinus in 1490. 10,000 Ottoman light cavalrymen crossed the Una River in 1491 and advanced into Carniola. On their way back they were defeated in the Battle of Vrpile. 2 years later a war started between the new Ban of Croatia, Emerik Derenčin, and the Frankopan family. The Frankopans were initially more successful and started to besiege the town of Senj, but the siege was lifted after an army led by Ban Derenčin was sent against them. However, the incoming Ottoman army led by Hadim Yakup Pasha (bey of the Sanjak of Bosnia), that was returning from a raid in Carniola through Croatia, forced them to make peace. Croatian nobles gathered around 10,000 men and decided to face them in an open battle, although some insisted that an ambush would be a better option. on 9 September 1493 the Croatian army intercepted Ottoman forces near Udbina in Lika and suffered a huge defeat in the Battle of Krbava Field. Although the defeat was heavy, the Ottoman Empire had no territorial gains as a result of it. Croatian population from the war-affected areas gradually started to move into safer parts of the country, while some refugees fled outside Croatia to Burgenland, Southern Hungary and the Italian coast.

On 16 August 1513 Ban Petar Berislavić defeated an Ottoman army of 7,000 men at the battle of Dubica on the Una river. In February 1514 the Ottomans besieged Knin with 10,000 men, burned the town's outskirts, but failed to capture it and lost 500 troops. Pope Leo X called Croatia the forefront of Christianity (Antemurale Christianitatis) in 1519, given that several Croatian soldiers made significant contributions to the struggle against the Ottoman Empire. Petar Berislavić spent 7 years in constant fighting with the Ottomans, faced with continuous money shortages and an insufficient number of troops, until he was killed in an ambush during the battle of Plješevica on 20 May 1520. After two failed attempts in 1513 and 1514, Ottoman forces led by Gazi Husrev-beg laid the final siege of Knin and captured it on 29 May 1522. They also besieged Klis on several occasions, but the captain of Senj and prince of Klis Petar Kružić defended the Klis Fortress for almost 25 years.

On 23 April 1526 Sultan Suleiman the Magnificent left Istanbul with 80,000 regular troops and a crowd of irregular auxiliaries, beginning his invasion of Hungary. He reached the Sava on 2 July, took Petrovaradin on 27 July after a two-week siege, and Ilok on 8 August. By 23 August his troops had crossed the Drava at Osijek without meeting resistance. On the same day King Louis II arrived at Mohács with about 25,000. Count Christopher Frankopan's 5,000 men-strong army did not arrive to the battlefield in time. The Hungarian army waited for the Ottomans on the plain south of Mohács on 29 August and was routed in less than two hours. The 1526 Battle of Mohács was a crucial event in which the rule of the Jagiellon dynasty was shattered by the death of King Louis II. The defeat emphasized the overall inability of the Christian feudal military to halt the Ottomans, who would remain a major threat for centuries.

== 1527 Parliament of Cetin ==
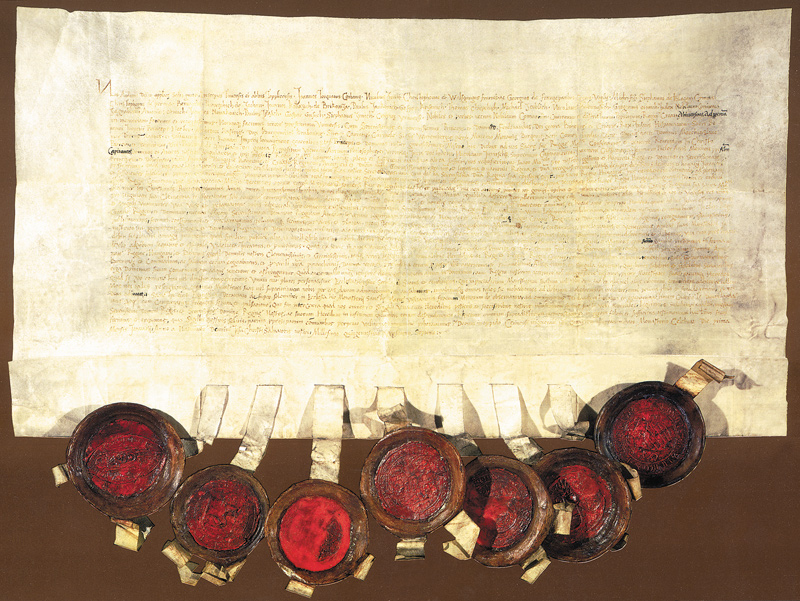
The Cetin Charter from 1 January 1527

Louis II had held the crown of Croatia among other titles, but left no heir. At the session on 10 November 1526, the majority of the Hungarian Diet chose John Zápolya to be the king, while a separate Hungarian assembly elected Archduke Ferdinand I in the rump diet in Pozsony on 16 December 1526. The Austrian Archduke was interested in the Croatian election in order to oppose Zápolya, promising at the same time to protect Croatia in turbulent period of Ottoman expansion to the west. The Croatian nobles met on 31 December 1526 to discuss their strategy and choose a new leader. The assembly occurred in the Franciscan monastery below the Cetin Castle in the settlement of Cetingrad. The Croatian parliament unanimously elected Ferdinand of the House of Habsburg as King of Croatia at their assembly in Cetin on 1 January 1527. The charter electing Ferdinand was confirmed with the seals of six Croatian nobles and four representatives of the Archduke. On 6 January 1527 the nobility from Slavonia sided with John Zápolya.

The Croatian historical narrative insists that the decision to join the Habsburg Empire was the result of a free choice made by the Sabor. Austrian historians align with this view and there appears to be little reason to doubt Croatian claims about the events of 1526. The political situation after the battle of Mohács – the king's death, two elected rulers, Ottoman conquests and, consequently, the splitting of Hungary into three parts, changed the entire medieval relation system. Civil war broke out between the supporters of Ferdinand and Zápolya that ended soon in an agreement to Ferdinand's benefit and both crowns would again be united in Habsburgs' hands. While this technically meant the restoration of a Croatian-Hungarian union, the relationship between two countries was changed permanently.

== Coat of arms ==
Since the 13th century the modern-day coat of arms of Dalmatia, three crowned lion heads on blue shield (originally on red shield), was used to represent the Kingdom of Croatia, as mentioned in numerous armorials of the time (Gelre Armorial, Constance Council Armorial or Wernigerode Armorial). It was also located on coins and seals of the kings, like the great seal of Matthias Corvinus and on the great coat of arms of King Louis I. The checkerboard coat or arms came to, initially decorative, in use in the late 15th century by the Habsburg dynasty, and since the 1527 election in Cetin became the official coat of arms of Croatia. It mostly consisted of five rows of five interlocking silver and red squares.

Coat of arms of Croatia in the 13th until 16th century (later used as coat of arms of Dalmatia)

Coat of arms in the late 15th and 16th century (first appeared in c. 1495 with Habsburgs)

== See also ==
- Ban of Croatia
- Ban of Slavonia
- Duke of Slavonia (i.e. Croatia)
- Hundred Years' Croatian–Ottoman War
