= Jergović =

Jergović is a surname. Notable people with the surname include:

- Filip Jergović, Montenegrin politician
- Miljenko Jergović (born 1966), Bosnian writer

== See also ==
- Jerković
