= Mladen Šubić =

Mladen Šubić may refer to:

- Mladen I Šubić (d. 1304), Croatian nobleman, member of the Šubić family of Bribir
- Mladen II Šubić (1270–1343), Croatian nobleman, member of the Šubić family of Bribir
- Mladen III Šubić (c. 1315–1348), Croatian nobleman, member of the Šubić family of Bribir
