= Gregory III =

Gregory III may refer to:

- Pope Gregory III, in office 731–741
- Gregory III, Count of Tusculum, r. 1058–1108
- Grigor III Pahlavuni, Armenian Catholicos of Cilicia in 1113–1166
- Gregory III Šubić of Bribir, died in 1342 or 1356, Croatian noble
- Patriarch Gregory III of Alexandria, Greek Orthodox patriarch, in office 1354–1366
- Patriarch Gregory III of Constantinople, in office 1443–1450
- Gregory III Laham, Patriarch of the Melkite Greek Catholic Church from 2000
