= Guglielmo da Varignana =

Italian professor of medicine (1270 - 1339)

- Born: 1270; Bologna, Italy
- Died: 1339; Bologna, Italy
- Occupations: Physician, philosopher, professor of medicine
- Era: Medieval
- Known for: Secreta sublimia ad varios curandos morbos (1319)
- Movement: Scholasticism

Guglielmo da Varignana, also Gulielmus Varignana (1270–1339) was a professor of medicine and philosopher from Bologna. He is best known for his medicinal tractate Sublime secrets of medicine to cure various diseases, which he wrote at the court of Mladen II Šubić of Bribir in 1319.

== Biography ==
He was a son of Bartolommeo da Varignana, a physician originally from Bologna, pupil of Taddeo Alderotti (died 1295); Bartolommeo gained fame as the physician to the Marchese Aldobrandino d'Este and the emperor Henry VII. Bartolommeo died in 1318 in Genoa.

Guglielmo was born in 1270 and is also named as a pupil of Taddeo Alderotti. Guglielmo is first recorded as professor of medicine, but was forced to flee his native Bologna as a Ghibelline in 1318, subsequently becoming a personal physician and advisor to Ban of Croatia Mladen II Šubić. At the same time, he contributed to curing residents of Zadar. There he wrote his first work Secreta sublimia ad varios curandos morbos (Sublime secrets of medicine to cure various diseases) in 1319, under the orders of Mladen. In 1320, he is sent as a diplomat to Venice to negotiate terms regarding the city of Šibenik. After the fall of Mladen at 1322 Battle of Bliska, he offered his services to the Republic of Ragusa, signing a two-year contract, which had proved fruitless. After his political opponents were defeated in Bologna, he returned there, remaining until he died in 1339.

== Works ==
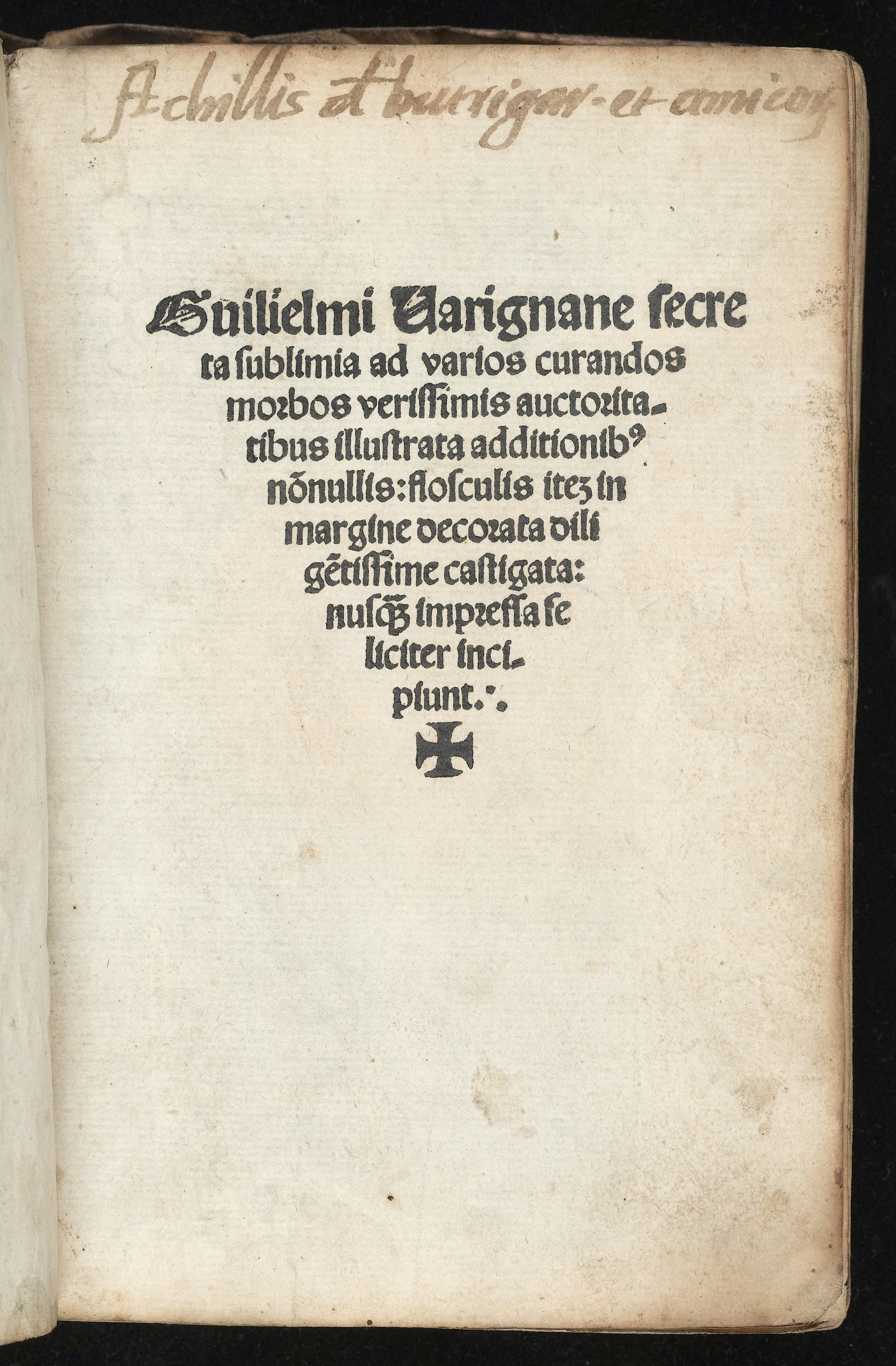
1520 Venetian print edition of Secreta sublimia

The following medicinal works were written by him:

- De febrium dispositione tractatus duo.
- Practica Canonica Ioannis Michaelis Savonaro; Johannes Michael.
- Secreta sublimia ad varios curandos morbos
- Ad omnium interiorum & exteriorum partium morbos remediorum praesidia

In 1519, his Secreta sublimia was published in print for the first time and achieved great popularity.
