= Jerković =

Jerković or Jerkovic (Serbian: Јерковић) is a surname. Notable people with the surname include:

- Dražan Jerković (1936–2008), Croatian and Yugoslav football forward, and manager
- Goran Jerković (born 1965), footballer
- Goran Jerković (born 1986), footballer
- Ivan Jerković (born 1979), footballer
- Ivona Jerković (born 1984), Serbian female basketball player
- Jakov Jerković (1607–1657), Croatian anti-Ottoman fighter and captain of Bosiljina (now Marina)
- Jurica Jerković (1950–2019), former Croatian footballer
- Katherine Jerkovic, Canadian film director
- Vedran Jerković (born 1991), footballer

== See also ==
- Braće Jerković, an urban neighborhood of Belgrade, the capital of Serbia
- Yerkovich
