= Yerkovich =

Yerkovich (Russian: Еркович) is a Russian surname. Notable people with the surname include:

- Anthony Yerkovich, American producer and television writer
- Gloria Yerkovich (born 1942), American activist
- Valeri Yerkovich (born 1951), Russian footballer and coach

== See also ==
- Jerković
