= Mladen II Šubić of Bribir =

Ban of Croatia and Lord of all of Bosnia (r. 1312–22)

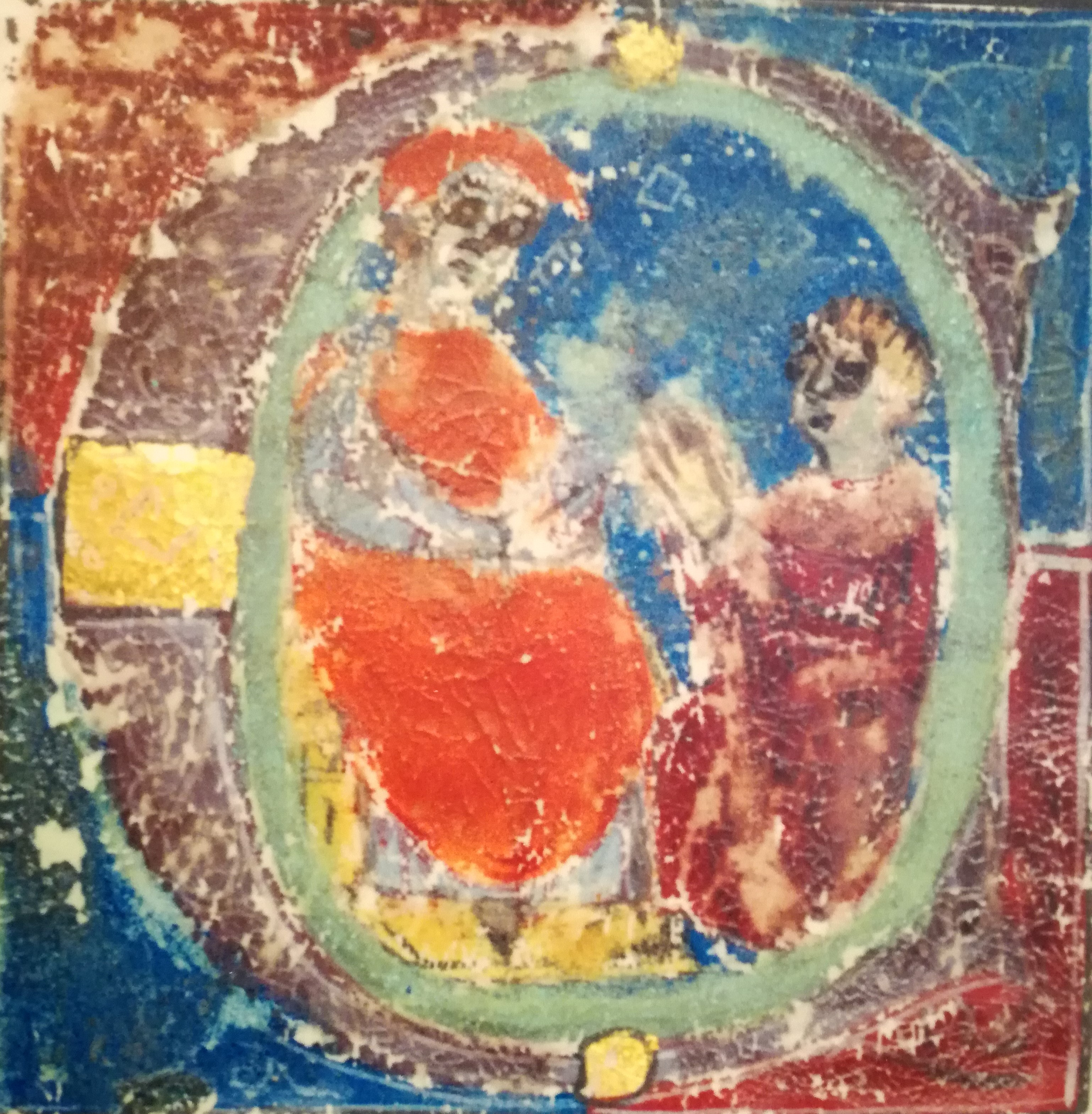
- Depiction of Mladen from a manuscript

Ban of Croatia
- Reign: 1312–1322
- Predecessor: Paul I Šubić of Bribir
- Successor: John Babonić

Lord of all of Bosnia
- Reign: 1312–1322
- Predecessor: Paul I Šubić of Bribir
- Successor: Stephen II Kotromanić

Ban of Bosnia
- Reign: 1304–1322
- Predecessor: Mladen I Šubić of Bribir
- Successor: Stephen II Kotromanić
- Born: c. 1270; Kingdom of Croatia
- Died: c. 1340; Hungary
- Spouse: Helen
- Issue: Elizabeta; Katarina Šubić
- House: House of Šubić
- Father: Paul I Šubić of Bribir
- Religion: Catholic

Mladen II Šubić of Bribir (Croatian: Mladen II Šubić Bribirski, Hungarian: bribiri Subics Mladen; c.1270 – c.1341), a Croatian leader and member of the Šubić noble family, was a Ban of Croatia and Lord of all of Bosnia. After succeeding his father Paul, he further consolidated the Šubić domain, and brought Stephen Kotromanić to administer Bosnia under his overlordship. His subsequent rule marked the weakening of the Šubić and ended with a mutiny of Dalmatian cities and Croatian nobility in 1322. This further led to Mladen's defeat at the Battle of Bliska and subsequent imprisonment by Charles I of Hungary, whom the Šubićs had previously brought to take the throne in Hungary. Mladen continued to develop the state and court institutions, and his de facto rule led to the further development of the chivalric culture in Croatia.

== Background ==
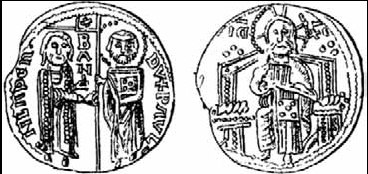
Coins issued by Paul I Šubić of Bribir. It reads: DVX PAVL – BAN –MLADEN.

Mladen II was christened as Ivan, in honour of John the Baptist, the patron saint of the Šubićs'.

Following a dynastic fracture in the monarchy of Hungary and Croatia, Mladen's father Paul emerged as a powerful oligarch who asserted sovereign rule over all of Croatia and Dalmatia, whose territories he distributed among his family members. He ruled from his seat in the fortified town of Bribir, where he erected, along with his castle, the three-aisled basilica of St. Mary inside the Franciscan convent.

After the extinction of the Árpád dynasty, Paul had the Angevins brought to the throne, although their power over the land held by the Šubić family was merely nominal throughout the entirety of their administration. Paul took extensive campaigns and significantly expanded his dominion eastward, over Bosnia and Hum, and also warred successfully against the Republic of Venice, taking the Dalmatian capital Zadar. He was the most powerful Croatian noble at the end of the 13th century and beginning of the 14th century. He also issued his own coin.

== Biography ==
=== Early years ===
Mladen II Šubić was an eldest son of Paul I Šubić of Bribir, who was the most powerful Croatian noble at the end of the 13th century and beginning of the 14th century, and his first wife whose name is not known. In regard to the date of his birth, there are no records available, but he is assumed to have been born around the year 1270. Mladen II had three brothers: George II Šubić, Gregory III Šubić and Paul II Šubić.

After the death of his uncle, the Bosnian Ban Mladen I Šubić in 1304, his father Paul I Šubić himself had to lead an army to crush the resistance in Šubić's Bosnia, after which in 1305 he took the title of "Lord of the all Bosnia" (totius Bosniae dominus), and passed the title of ban to Mladen. Upon the taking of the city of Zadar from the Venetians, he was elected Duke of Zadar by the commune and also assumed the title "Prince of Dalmatia". His troops also participated in the subsequent battle against the Venetian Republic, who attempted to take the city back. He ruled over Bosnia under his father, but after Paul's death in 1312, the situation in Bosnia and Croatia became more complicated.

=== Reign ===
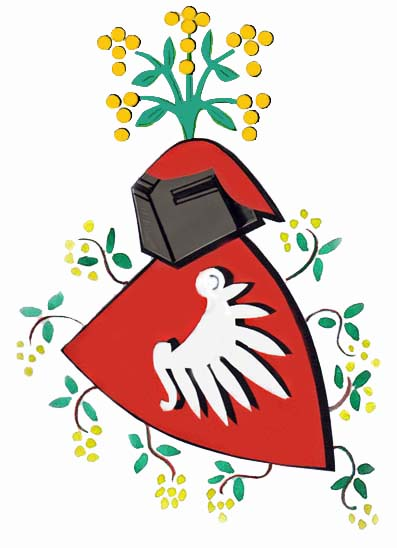
Coat of Arms of the Šubić noble family

He succeeded his father as Ban of Croatia in the aftermath of his death on 1 May 1312 and inherited a strongly-founded dominion encompassing all of Croatia, Bosnia, Zahumlje and the Dalmatian cities. His wife Helen, was a relative of the Capetian House of Anjou, and Mladen already made marriage contracts of their children to the counts of Gorizia, which could serve as valuable allies in the war against the Republic of Venice.

Mladen greatly weakened the Venetian attempts to take Zadar, by buying off the leader of their mercenaries, which greatly reduced their potential on land. However, in September 1313, he allowed the return of Zadar to Venice, under the condition of granting the city considerable autonomy. He relinquished the title Duke of Zadar, but was granted citizenship of Zadar under Venetian patronage by 1314. In doing this, he kept a strong and stable relations with the city and made status quo with Venice.

His rule was met with mutiny for the first time in spring of 1315 when the Captain and Potestat of the city of Trogir, Matthew of Zori, expelled members of the Andreis family in an internal struggle within the city. Although this was not an act directed against Mladen's rule, the expelled received his support and as a result, he answered with hostility. Mladen requested from the commune "to send him a blank piece of paper, on which he will write whatever he wants from the city" and forty hostages, which was rejected by the city council. Fearing Mladen's wrath, they also decided to destroy the monastery outside the city walls, to prevent it from being used as a military base against the city. Despite the incident, it did not escalate, and Mladen allowed Matej to keep his position. However, he imposed a large fine on the city. Matej Zori made contacts with the members of Mladen's court in order to secure better status. In 1317, Matej Zori was eventually ousted from his position and was driven into exile by certain outer elements, with the help of the city of Šibenik, an act which was supported by Mladen. He imposed further sanctions of the city and Matej's supporters in 1318.

Apart from Trogir, he also faced problems with the Croatian nobility. He inherited a dispute from his father regarding Jablanac, with the noble Frederick III (Frankopan) of Krk, although this did not pose any significant threat. A larger threat emerged from a rebellion of counts Nelipić and Kurjaković in the winter of 1316–1317, probably in connection with his conflicts against the Slavonian Babonić nobles. However, it was concluded shortly thereafter, and the mutineers did not seem to have fallen in his disfavor.

Following the death of Stephen Dragutin, he occupied the northern territories of today's Bosnia and Hercegovina, Usora and Soli. This act prompted a retaliation of the neighboring Raška, which attacked Šubić's territories from Ston. In 1318, he joined the crusade of Phillip of Taranto, titular Latin Emperor and cousin of his wife, against the King of Rascia, Milutin. Mladen invaded Raška from his territories in Zahumlje and was initially successful, but had to withdraw in the subsequent years. In the aftermath, his younger brother George II (who was the prince of Omiš) was given as a hostage to the opposing side as part of the peace negotiations, and was subsequently transferred to the city of Dubrovnik for safe keeping.

Mladen's rule was unpopular with Bosnia's nobility, specifically among the supporters of the former Bosnian ban Stephen Kotromanić. As a result, he placed Kotromanić under his patronage and arranged a marriage between him and one of the daughters of Meinhard of Ortenburg. He also took a tolerant stance towards Bosnia's krstjani (members of the Bosnian Church), which brought him into conflict with the Pope. Later, in order to restore and quiet situation in Bosnia, he appointed Stephen in 1322 as the Bosnian Ban.

=== Last years and fall ===
The dominion of Mladen in 1312, following Paul I's death

Another mutiny emerged within the city of Šibenik in 1319, the most loyal city towards the Šubić family. The causes of it are not known, but it is known that the commune requested mediation by Venice. The rebellion was taken very seriously by Mladen, as it offered an opportunity for Venice to meddle in Mladen's affair directly, although it was already crushed before they could act diplomatically. He imprisoned the leaders of the rebellion Koza of Ilija, under the accusations of conspiring against his life. Mladen's fall began with the second rebellion of Šibenik in 1321/1322, which was soon joined by Trogir. Mladen first attacked and pillaged Šibenik's surroundings, which was followed by laying siege to the city itself. He ordered Koza's brothers to be brought before the city and executed in clear sight. This act only deepened the conflict and provoked other members of the Croatian nobility to mutiny, including his younger brother Paul II, who was at the time Duke of Trogir. The rebellion of the cities received support from Venice and in March 1322, Šibenik accepted Venetian rule, who in turn sent a fleet to defend it from Mladen's attempts at retribution. Paul II and the city of Trogir made an alliance with the goal of deposing Mladen and replacing him with Paul. Despite this, Trogir also accepted Venice's supremacy, declaring that its loyalty belongs to Charles I of Hungary, its natural master. This forced Mladen to convene an assembly of the Croatian nobility in order to gain support and tone down the tensions with the Dalmatian cities. The attempt was unsuccessful, as the assembly ended with even more animosity of the rest of the nobility towards him.

The conflict gave pretext to king Charles, who eliminated the oligarchic powers in Hungary by then, in restoring royal power in Croatia, since he disputed Mladen's rule over these lands. The king named a new Ban of Croatia, John Babonić, and alongside him departed to face Mladen. The first battle took place in the vicinity of Šibenik, in which Mladen's troops were defeated, forcing him to withdraw to the south. The armies of Trogir, Šibenik and Venice pillaged the city of Skradin. The second and final battle occurred in Blizna near Klis Fortress. Mladen's army consisted of his own troops, those of his brother George II, as well as Vlachs' and those from lesser nobility of the Poljica region. The opposing army were royal troops under John Babonić in coalition with the Croatian nobility (including Paul II Šubić) and the militia of Trogir and Šibenik. The battle resulted in the victory for the coalition, forcing Mladen further south into Klis Fortress.

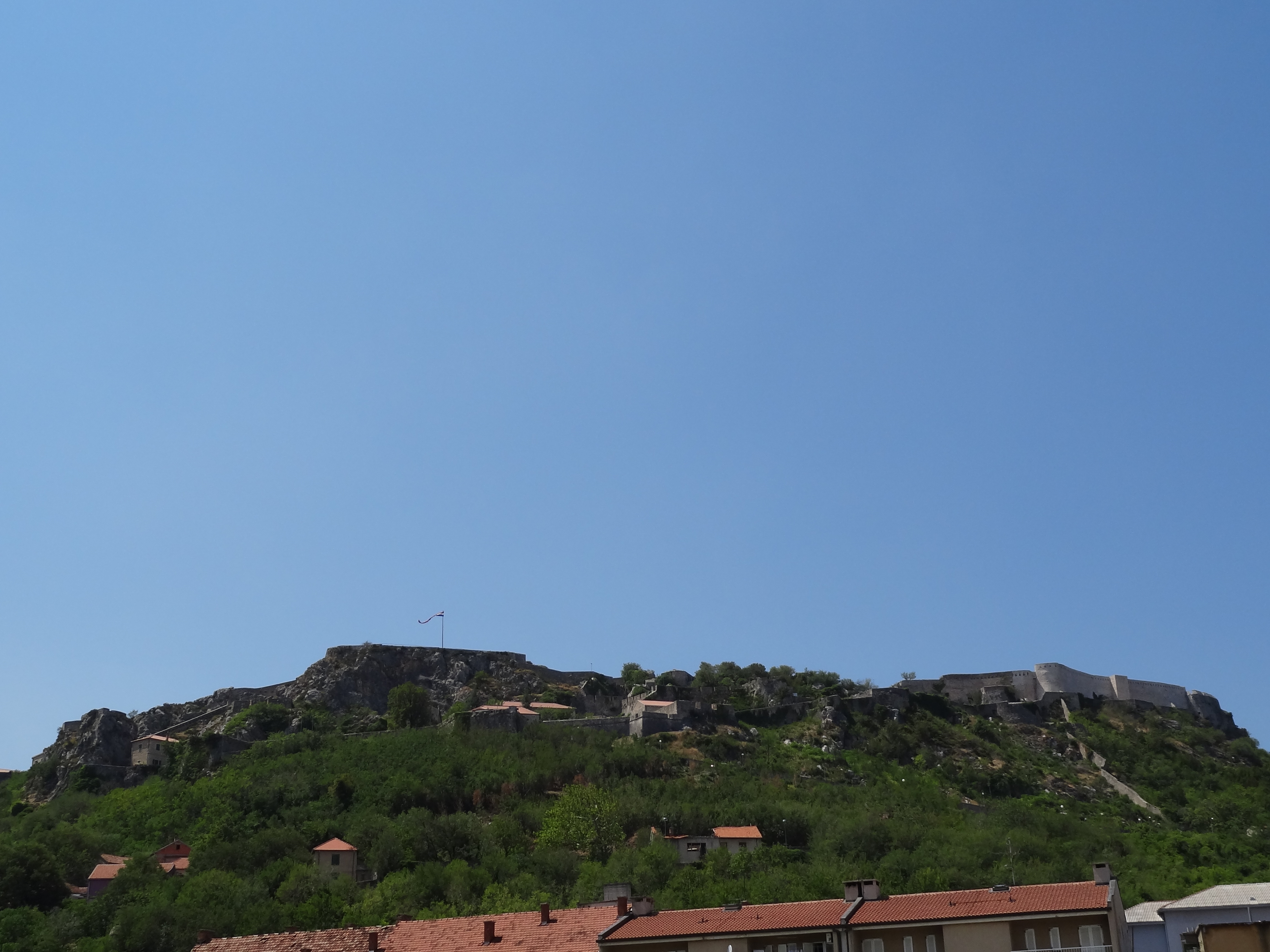
Knin Castle, medieval remnants

In the Klis Fortress, Mladen received news of the king's arrival in Knin, which prompted him to send his younger brother George II as a diplomat with intent to negotiate. Charles I received George very diligently and gave his assurance for Mladen to arrive personally to Knin. Despite the king's previous promises, when Mladen arrived, he was imprisoned and taken alongside the king to Hungary, where he lived in captivity under unknown circumstances. It is possible that his daughter Catherine was also taken. He is assumed to have died around the year 1341.

As a result, the king gave Stephen II Kotromanić Bosnia and Dalmatia from Cetina to Dubrovnik. Mladen's former court member and conspirator, Ivan Nelipić, used the opportunity to seize Knin from the royal forces. After Mladen II's defeat, the Šubić family not only lost Bosnia, but also lands in Croatia, and lost forever its previous influence. Mladen II was succeeded by his brother George and subsequently his nephew Mladen III Šubić as heads of the Šubić family, who continued to rule over Klis, Skradin and Omiš until 1348.

== Legacy and assessment ==
Historians give various reasons for Mladen's failure in relation to the career of his father, namely his violent tendencies and vanity, although those were not unusual traits for a ruler. At the same time, he was praised by his contemporaries for his chivalrous and intellectual virtues. Even the very negative description of chronicler Miha Madijev admits that he read the Holy Scripture often. He seems to have inspired his personal physician, William of Varignan (later also a professor of medicine), to write scientific tractates.

In the eyes of the Dalmatian cities and some of his other subjects, he was remembered as a tyrant. His power as an arbiter became a burden for the Dalmatian cities, whose aristocracy and citizens required more space for self-governing, which was impossible to do with the domination of Mladen's court members. Croatian nobility was also unhappy, since they wanted a larger share of the rule for themselves. Mladen's political and military failures only encouraged their appetites.

His fate caused sympathies in national tradition, and in 19th century two places in the Knin Castle were thought to be the places of his temporary captivity.

== Titles ==
In the document of 10 April 1318, Mladen II Šubić is called "Ban of the Croats and Bosnia and general lord of Hum country".

== See also ==
- House of Šubić
- Stephen II, Ban of Bosnia
- List of rulers of Croatia
- List of rulers of Bosnia

== Footnotes ==
Regnal titles
Preceded by Mladen I Šubić	Ban of Bosnia; 1304–1322	Succeeded by Stephen II Kotromanić
Preceded by Paul I Šubić	Ban of Croatia; 1312–1322	Succeeded by John Babonić
Preceded by Paul I Šubić	Lord of all of Bosnia; 1312–1322	Succeeded by Stephen II Kotromanić
