= Poljica, Marina =

Coordinates: 43°31′09″N 16°08′13″E

- Interactive map of Poljica, Marina

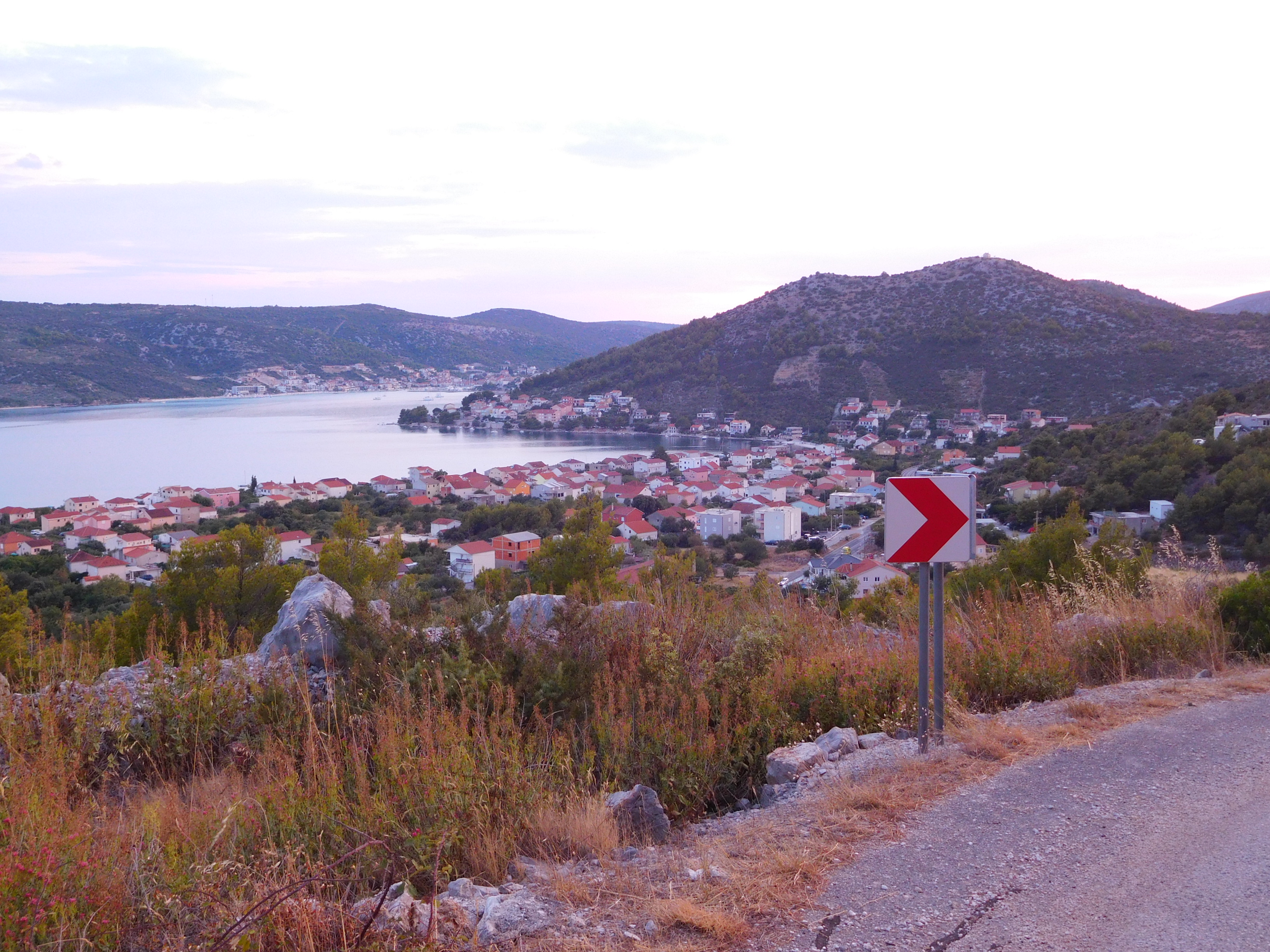
Poljica - view from the side of Gorač hill

Poljica is a village in the municipality of Marina, Croatia. In the 2011 census, it had 681 inhabitants.
