= Marina, Croatia =

Municipality in Split-Dalmatia County, Croatia

Marina
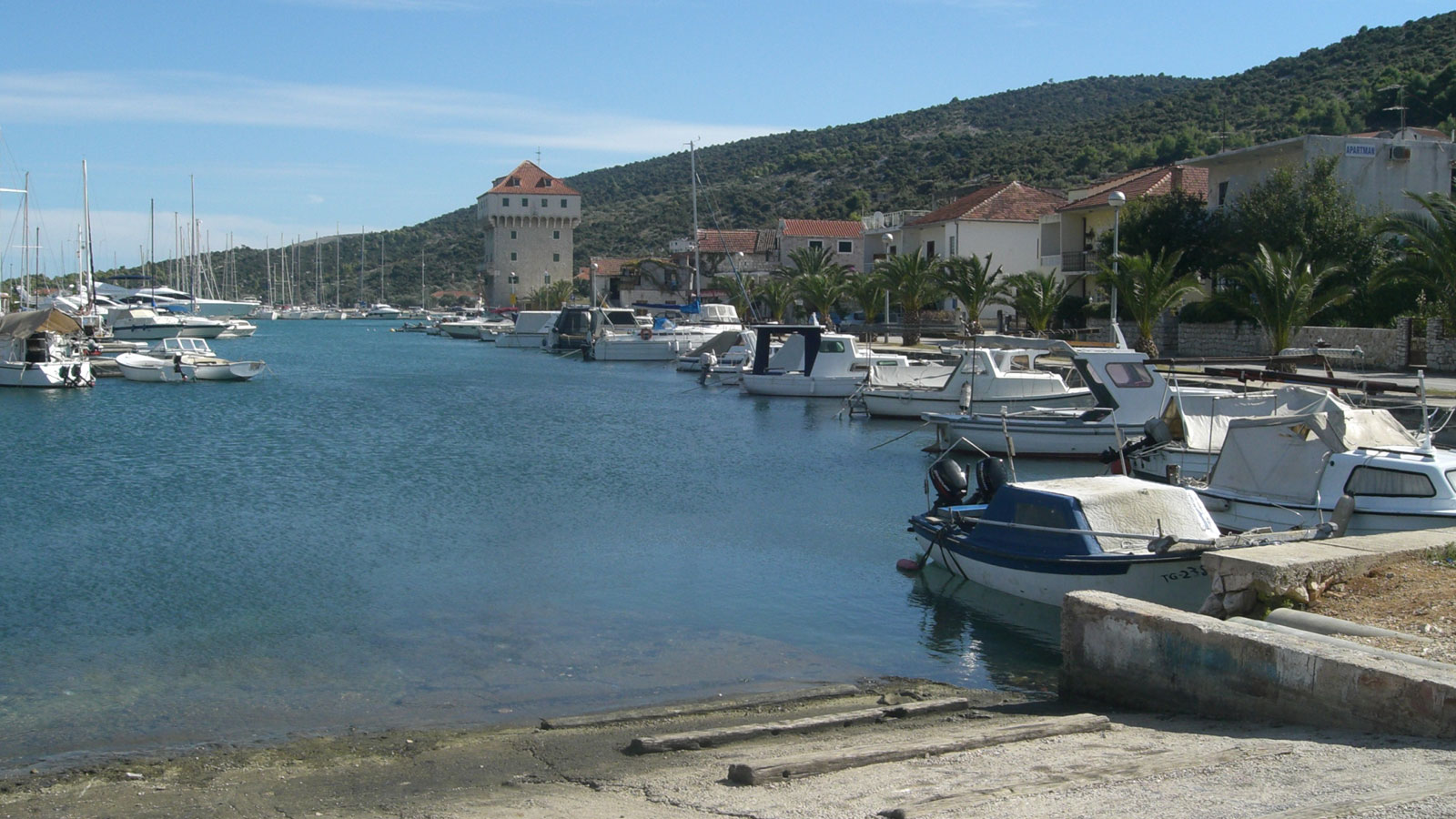
- Marina port and centre

- Location within Croatia
- Country: Croatia
- Region: Dalmatia
- County: Split-Dalmatia County

Area
  - Total: 118.4 km^{2} (45.7 sq mi)

Population (2021)
  - Total: 4,273
  - Density: 36.09/km^{2} (93.47/sq mi)
- Time zone: UTC+1 (CET)
  - Summer (DST): UTC+2 (CEST)
- Website: marina.hr

Marina is a village and a municipality in Split-Dalmatia County, Croatia. Marina is a tourist resort and a small harbor near the old Dalmatian town of Trogir. The town is dominated by a Venetian picturesque fort (tower), a former summer house of Trogir bishops from the 15th century, restored and adapted into an hotel. Place was mentioned in 1070 AC as Bosiljina.

== History ==
The settlement was planned in the 16th century. In the period 1495-1500 the bishops of Trogir built a quadrangular tower on the islet in the bay. The tower has console battlements. The channel between the mainland and the tower was filled up and levelled at the beginning of the 20th century. The structure was repaired during the Cretan war in 1657 and 1717 and reconstructed in 1971 to 1972. The church of St John has Gothic and Renaissance elements. In a field close to the village there is a small Gothic church of St. Luke with the coat of arms of the Sobota family.

== Geography ==
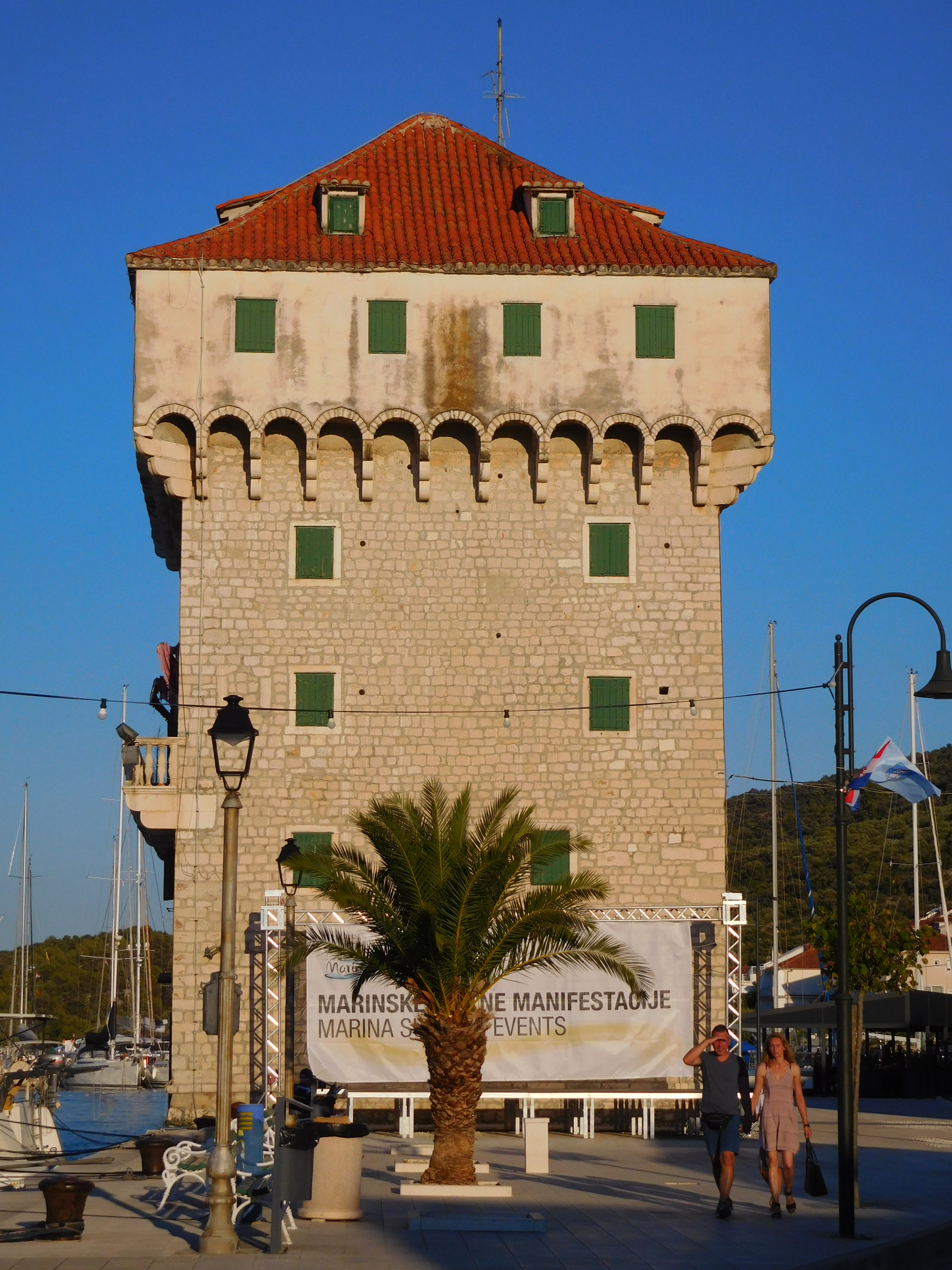
Venetian tower, most notable monument of Marina

It is the most western municipality in Split-Dalmatia County and is bordering Šibenik-Knin County.

Marina is located on the Adriatic Highway (D8). It is a tourist village with a pebble beach shaded by olive and pine trees.

== Tourism ==
Tourist also enjoy the atmosphere of ancient Dalmatian wine cellars, fresh fish and quality local wines, a blend of the ancient and the modern. Yachting, diving and fishing are practiced. Small yachts may dock within the small harbour and larger ones at the end of the bay, southeast of the chapel and south of the Plokata hill.

== Population ==
In the 2011 census, it had a total municipality population of 4,595, in the following settlements.

- Blizna Donja, population 258
- Blizna Gornja, population 93
- Dograde, population 194
- Gustirna, population 349
- Marina, population 1,117
- Mitlo, population 75
- Najevi, population 42
- Poljica, population 681
- Pozorac, population 137
- Rastovac, population 89
- Sevid, population 267
- Svinca, population 112
- Vinišće, population 774
- Vinovac, population 75
- Vrsine, population 332

In the 2011 census, 97.6% of the population were Croats.

Marina: Population trends 1857–2021
v

population	2811	2724	3088	3462	3770	3984	5279	6291	5719	6002	6020	5442	4775	4417	4771	4595	4273
	1857	1869	1880	1890	1900	1910	1921	1931	1948	1953	1961	1971	1981	1991	2001	2011	2021

Sources: Croatian Bureau of Statistics publications

== Notable people ==
Jakov Jerković (1607 – 1657), anti-Ottoman fighter and captain of Bosiljina (now Marina) in the Cretan War (1645–1669)
