= Battle of Bliska =

1322 popular revolt against the rule of Mladen II Šubić of Bribir, Ban of Croatia

Date	August/September 1322
Location	Bliska (present day Blizna), hinterland of Trogir, Kingdom of Croatia
Result	Victory of the coalition of noblemen and Dalmatian coastal towns against Mladen II Šubić of Bribir, Ban of Croatia

Belligerents
Royal forces of King Charles I Robert; Opposing Croatian nobility Dalmatian coastal towns	Allies of Mladen II Šubić of Bribir

Commanders and leaders
John Babonić, Ban of Slavonia; Paul II Šubić of Bribir; Ivan Nelipić, Stephen II Ban of Bosnia	Mladen II Šubić of Bribir, Ban of Croatia; George II Šubić of Bribir

Strength
Unknown	Unknown

Casualties and losses
Unknown	Unknown

The Battle of Bliska (present day Blizna in the hinterland of Trogir called Zagora, southern Croatia) was fought in 1322 between the army of a coalition of several Croatian noblemen and Dalmatian coastal towns (with the support of the king Charles I Robert of Anjou) and the forces of Mladen II Šubić of Bribir, Ban of Croatia, and his allies. The battle resulted in the defeat of Mladen II, who lost his power.

== Background ==
After the death of Paul I Šubić of Bribir (Croatian: Pavao I Šubić Bribirski), Ban of Croatia and Lord of all of Bosnia, on May 1, 1312, his properties and titles were passed to his eldest son Mladen II, who already ruled over Bosnia before as a Ban of Bosnia. The young Croato-Hungarian king Charles I Robert of Anjou dynasty, who did not yet have power over the country, tolerated an unlimited and intangible rule of Mladen II over his territory, because Mladen's father had helped Charles to come to the throne. Eventually, Mladen II came into conflict with the Croatian noblemen in his broader neighbourhood, like the counts of Krk (future Frankopans), Kurjakovićs (counts of Krbava) and Nelipićs, with some Dalmatian coastal towns (Šibenik, Trogir), with Stephen II Kotromanić (Croatian: Stjepan II Kotromanić), Bosnian nobleman, and again with the old adversary – the Republic of Venice.

The turbulent events that followed in the next few years (from 1317 until 1322) were marked by and full of revolts, rebellions, sieges, armed clashes, changes of sides (going over to the opponent's side), maneuvers, and tactical deceptions of both sides. John Babonić (Croatian: Ivan Babonić), Ban of Slavonia, was also involved, having received support of the king who was convinced that the time had come to weaken the power of the Šubić family.

== Troop deployment ==
The troops of Mladen Šubić were composed from his own men, as well as that of his brother Juraj (George), who also took part in the battle. It also included the Vlach troops as well as the lesser nobility of the Poljica region. The opposing army was composed primarily of forces loyal to the king, under Ban of Slavonia John Babonić, along with the coalition of the rebellious nobles, including Mladen's brother Paul II, who betrayed him with the intent of securing the position of ban for himself. These troops were also aided by reinforcements from the Dalmatian cities Trogir and Šibenik.

=== Battle ===
There are no detailed facts left about the battle itself, but it is known that Mladen II suffered a defeat. He himself, as well as his brother George II, saved his life and temporarily found shelter in Klis, George's fortress.

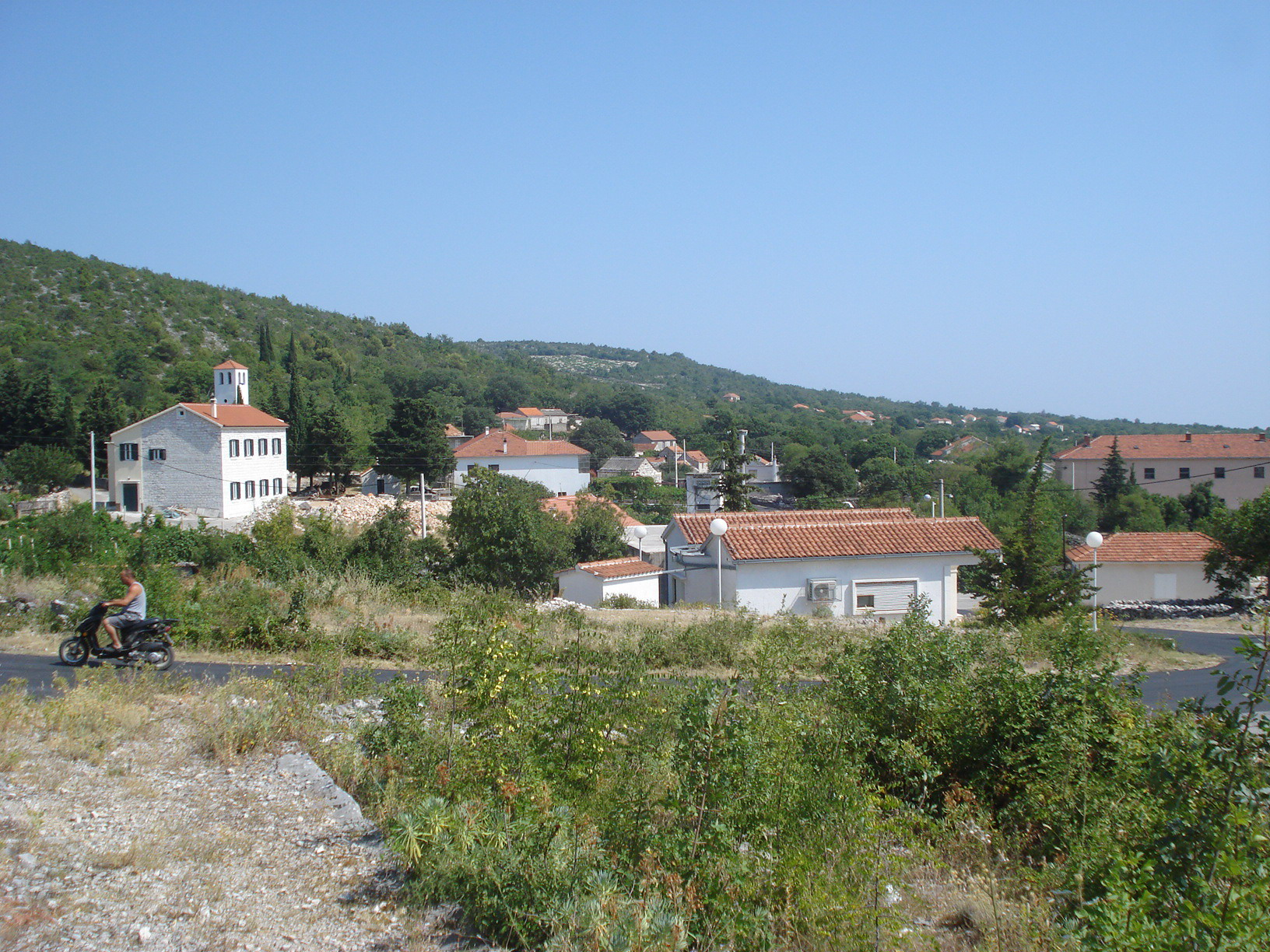
Blizna Donja – the present day look of the place of battle

== Aftermath and consequences ==
Not long after the battle, the king Charles I Robert appeared in southern Croatia, leading his army, trying to calm down the situation. At the assembly held in the Knin fortress on October 8, 1322, the winners of the battle of Bliska were given (or confirmed) the properties and privileges by the king, whereas Mladen II Šubić of Bribir lost his freedom and was taken to Hungary. There he spent the next twenty years or so in custody at the Court, until his death between 1341 and 1343.

The battle of Bliska meant the end of enormous power and influence of the main branch of the princes of Bribir led by Mladen II. He tried to maintain the hold over the other Croatian clans, but was unsuccessful. He lost a great part of the former estates, land, castles, and towns held by the Šubićs, and their hereditary right to be bans of Croatia as well. King Charles chose, namely, John Babonić to be the Ban, whereas Stephen II Kotromanić became the Ban of Bosnia. Further consequence was the strengthening of other Croatian noblemen, especially the members of Nelipić family and the princes of Krk (Frankopan).

However, the brothers of Mladen II (George II, Paul II, Gregory (Croatian: Grgur) and Mark (Croatian: Marko)) as well as their sons (Mladen III, George III (future George I Zrinski), Paul III, Božidar and Pribko), abode and kept their old properties for almost the next thirty years. It was only when the new Croato-Hungarian king Louis the Great started to reign in the 1340s, that he, by exchanging the estates, partially succeeded in displacing the members of Šubić family.

== Literature ==
- Karbić, Damir (February 2005). "Šubići Bribirski do gubitka nasljedne banske časti (1322.)" [The Šubići of Bribir until the Loss of the Hereditary Position of the Croatian Ban (1322)] (PDF). Zbornik Odsjeka za povijesne znanosti Zavoda za povijesne i društvene znanosti Hrvatske akademije znanosti i umjetnosti (in Croatian). 22. Zagreb: Croatian Academy of Sciences and Arts: 1–26.
- Battle of Bliska in „History of Croatia“ by Rudolf Horvat, Edition of 1924
- John V. A. Fine, Jr.: 'The late medieval Balkans' (a survey) – Battle of Bliska is on the page 212
