= Jakov Jerković =

Jakov Jerković (4 February 1607 – 27 June 1657) was a Croatian anti-Ottoman fighter and captain of Bosiljina (now Marina) during the War of Candia (1645–1669).

Jerković (also: Gercovich, Gerković, Giercovich, Hiercovich; Giacomo) was born on February 4, 1607, in the village of Bosiljina (now Marina) as the youngest child of Jerolim Jerković and his wife Urša.

== Cretan War and Battle for Marina in 1657 ==
During the War of Candia (Cretan War), also known as the fifth Ottoman-Venetian War, following an unsuccessful attack on the city of Split the Ottoman army concentrated its operations on the Venetian-controlled territory west of Trogir and the strategically important but poorly held settlement of Bosiljina (now Marina). Jerković was the local commander or captain of Bosiljina in Venetian service. The Ottoman army was led by Bosnian governor Seyid Ahmed Pasha (1656–1659).

According to chroniclers' reports, on June 27, 1657 after enduring an uneven struggle, Jerković refused to submit and was killed, along with most of his comrades, including one of his sons, while the other was captured. After capturing the settlement, Ottoman soldiers mutilated his corpse, impaled his heart on a spear, and displayed it in the local square.

In his 1756 notable work Razgovor ugodni naroda slovinskoga (Pleasant Conversation of Slavic People), 18th-century Croatian poet Andrija Kačić Miošić praised the heroism of captain Jakov Jerković in the Battle for Bosiljina (now Marina) against the much more numerous Ottoman army.

== Poem of the Battle for Marina ==
Poem number 78 of Andrija Kačić Miošić's notable work Pleasant Conversations of the Slavic People covers the Battle of Marina and mentions Jakov Jerković in 5 stanzas:

…

six hundred chosen heroes,
who welcomed the Turkish army,
and in front of them a young captain,
named Jakov Jerković.

…

So he called out to Jerković Jakov
the pasha quietly said to him:
»Surrender, young captain,
don't lose your head in vain!«

Jerković Jakov says to him:
»My loyalty, Segdijić Pasha,
I would rather lose my head,
than betray the Doge of Venice.«

…

and most of all Jerković Jakov
and his two sons beloved,
but they too, blood brother, perished
fighting in battle, cutting off the heads.

…

what a heart Jerković had
as young Marko Kraljević.
Jerković, your departed soul,
your name never dies!
