= Louis I =

Louis I may refer to:

== Cardinals ==
- Louis I, Cardinal of Guise (1527–1578)

== Counts ==
- Ludwig I, Count of Württemberg (c. 1098–1158)
- Louis I of Blois (1172–1205)
- Louis I of Flanders (1304–1346)
- Louis I of Châtillon (died 1346)
- Louis I, Count of Montpensier (1405–1486)
- Louis Günther I of Schwarzburg-Rudolstadt (1581–1646)

== Dukes ==
- Louis I Wittelsbach, Duke of Bavaria (1173–1231)
- Louis I, Duke of Bourbon (1279–1342)
- Louis I, Duke of Orléans (1372–1407)
- Louis I, Duke of Bar (died in 1430)
- Louis I, Grand Duke of Hesse (1753–1830), previously Louis X, Landgrave of Hesse-Darmstadt

== Kings ==
- Louis the Pious, Louis I of France, "the Pious" (778–840), king of France and Holy Roman Emperor
- Louis I of Hungary, Louis I of Poland and Hungary, (1326–1382)
- Louis I of Naples (1339–1384)
- Louis I of Spain (1707–1724)
- Louis I of Etruria (1773–1803)
- Louis Bonaparte (1778–1846), King of Holland 1806–1810 as Louis I
- Ludwig I of Bavaria (1786–1868)
- Luís I of Portugal (1838–1889)
- Louis VIII of France who claimed the throne of England as Louis I of England, (1216–1217)
- Louis X of France, also known as Louis I of Navarre (1289–1316)
- Louis Philippe I of France

== Landgraves ==
- Louis I, Landgrave of Thuringia (ruled 1123–1140)

== Princes ==
- Louis I, Prince of Condé (1530–1569)
- Louis I of Monaco (1642–1701)
- Louis Frederick I, Prince of Schwarzburg-Rudolstadt (1667–1718)
