= Blizna Donja =

Village in Croatia

- Village
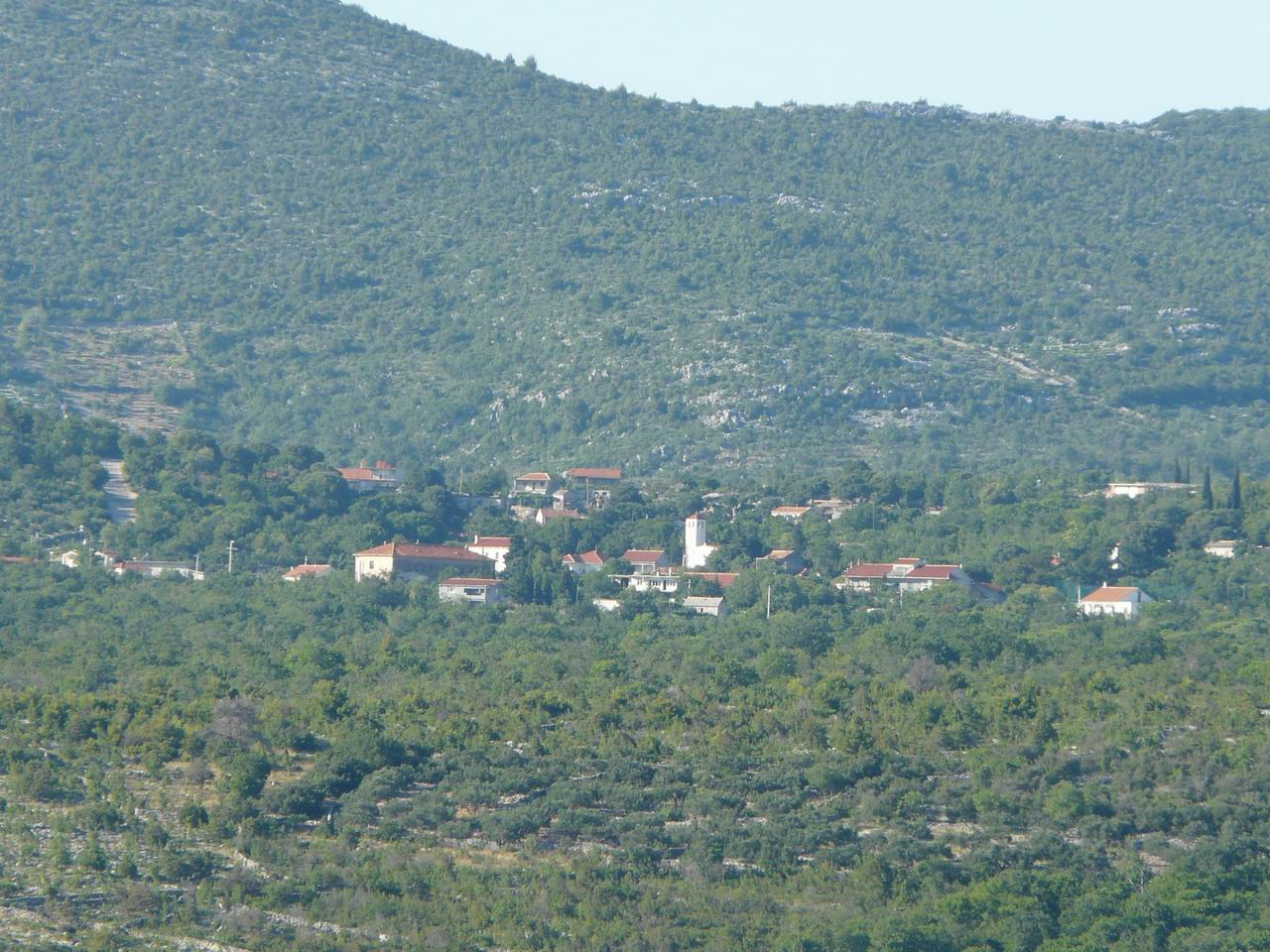
- The village of Blizna Donja
- Interactive map of Blizna Donja
- Location within Croatia
- Coordinates: 43.586°N 16.098°E
- Country: Croatia
- County: Split-Dalmatia

Population (2011)
  - Total: 258

Blizna is a village near Marina, Croatia. In the 2011 census, it had 258 inhabitants.
