= Paul II Šubić of Bribir =

Paul II Šubić of Bribir (Croatian: Pavao II Šubić Bribirski) (died 1346) was a Count of Trogir and Ostrovica and a member of the Croatian Šubić noble family.

== Biography ==
Paul II was the third son of Croatian Ban Paul I. He was first mentioned in contemporary sources in 1301, when he was the prince of Tropolje together with his brothers. He was also mentioned as the prince of Trogir in 1305, and of Skradin in 1311. Dissatisfied with the division of powers with his brothers, he led, together with other Croatian nobles, a rebellion against his brother, Mladen II, in a desire to gain further power. After his brother's defeat at the battle of Bliska in 1322, he however failed in his intention to inherit the position paramount power in the family, which went to his other brother, George II.

He subsequently supported Mladen III in the fight against other nobles and King Louis I, for which he received the administration of Ostrovica from Mladen III. Paul bequeathed Ostrovica to his underage son, George III, to whom he appointed his brother Gregory II as guardian.

He married the Krk princess Elizabeth Frankopan (Elizabeta Krčka) (date of birth unknown, died in 1347), with whom he had two sons, George III (also known as George I Zrinski) and Pribko, and daughter Katarina.

In 1347, Gregory II, in the name of George III, handed over Ostrovica and the Luka County to King Louis I, in exchange for the fort of Zrin and other estates in its vicinity. Both Gregory II and George III moved to Zrin, and the family was since then named after the newly acquired property of Zrin as the Zrinski family. George III was the first who used the name Zrinski.

== See also ==
- Zrinski
- Frankopan
