= Gregory III Šubić of Bribir =

Gregory III Šubić of Bribir (Croatian: Grgur III Šubić Bribirski; died c. 1235 CE) was a member of the Croatian Šubić noble family. He successfully fought wars against his uncle, Višan Šubić of Zvonigrad, and Count Domald. Victorious, he became Prince of Split.
