= Ferhad Pasha Sokolović =

Ottoman general and statesman from Bosnia

- Ferhad-paša Sokolović
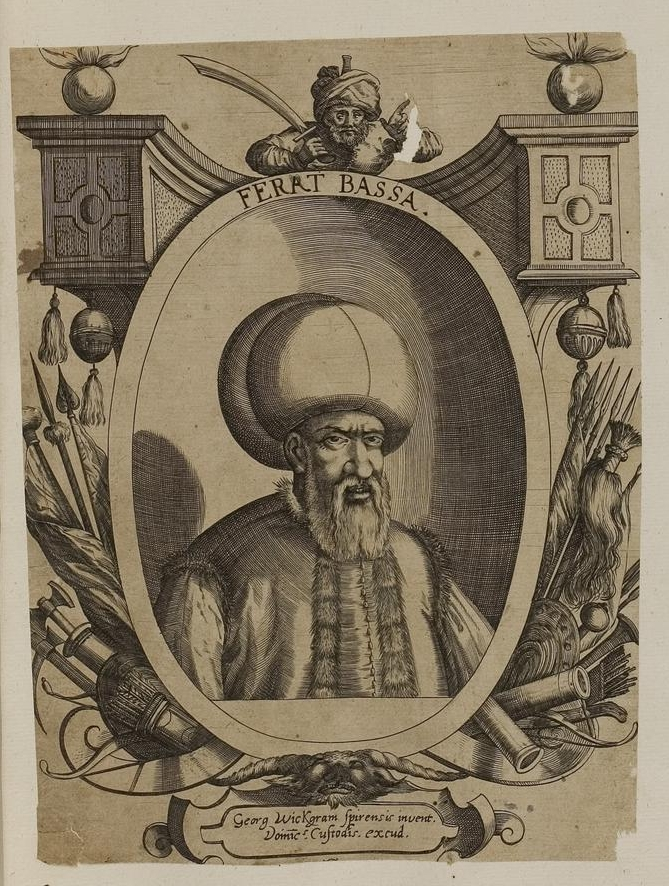
- Ferhad Pasha Sokolović
- Born: 1530; Sanjak of Bosnia, Ottoman Empire
- Died: 1590 (aged 59–60); Buda, Budin Eyalet, Ottoman Empire
- Cause of death: Murdered (stabbing)
- Burial place: Ferhat Pasha Mosque Banja Luka
- Relatives: Relative of Sokollu Mehmed Pasha
- Military career
- Allegiance: Ottoman Empire (Bosnia Eyalet)
- Commands: Siege of Gvozdansko and Ottoman expansion into Croatia
- Battles: Siege of Gvozdansko

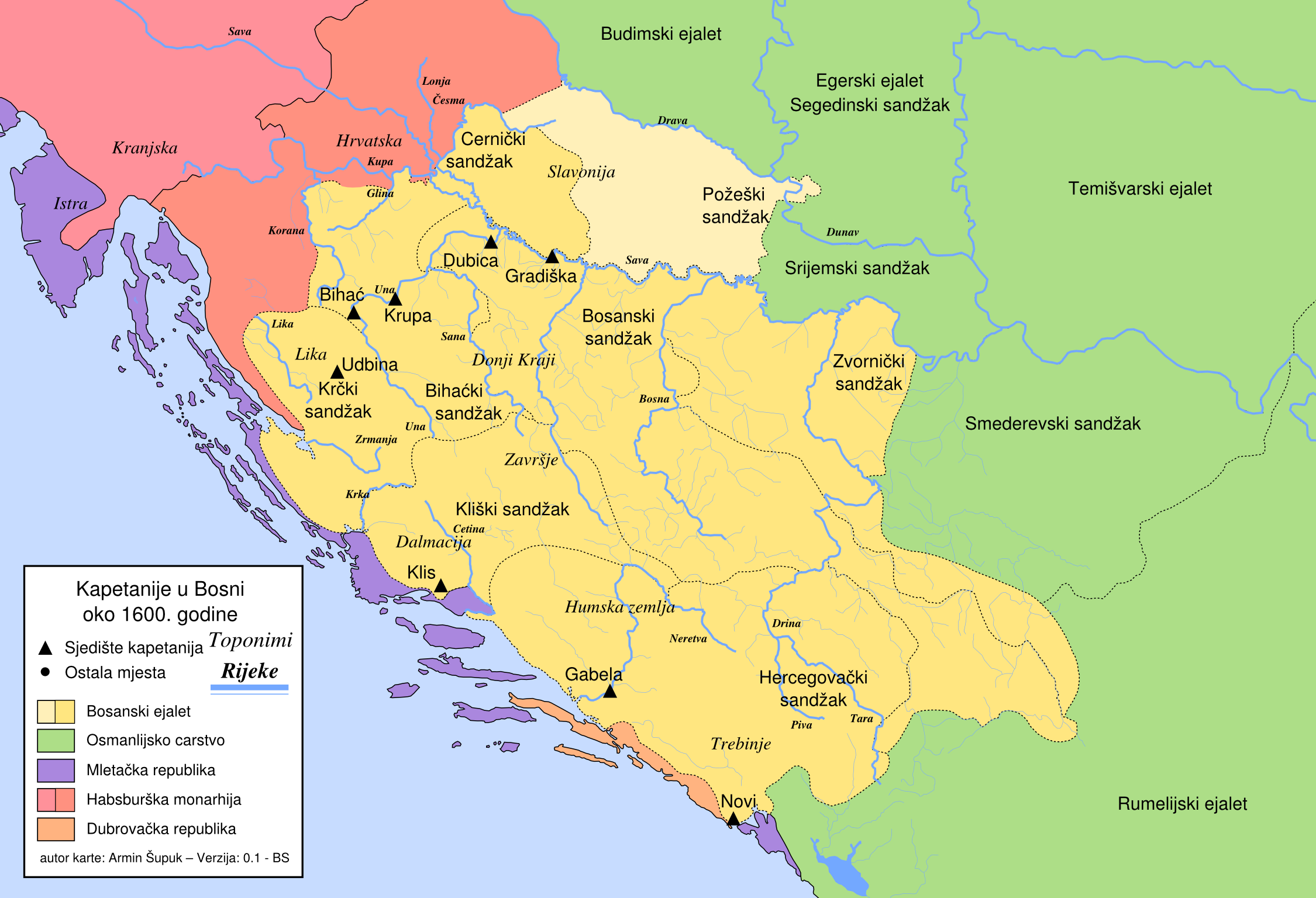
Bosnia Eyalet around the year 1600 at its height.

Ferhad Pasha Sokolović (Turkish: Sokollu Ferhat Paşa, Serbian Cyrillic: Ферхат-паша Соколовић, romanized: Ferhat-paša Sokolović) (died 1590) was an Ottoman general and statesman from Bosnia. He was the last sanjak-bey of Bosnia and first beylerbey of Bosnia.

== Origin ==
Born into the Sokolović family, he was, like his close relative Grand Vizier Sokollu Mehmed Pasha (Mehmed-paša Sokolović) abducted as part of the devşirme system of collection of Christian boys to be raised to serve in the janissary corps, Islamized and recruited into Ottoman service. While one part of the family became Islamized, the other stayed Christian; notably, another relative (possibly Mehmed's brother), Makarije Sokolović, was appointed as a Serbian Patriarch by Mehmed Pasha, who with the support of the Sultan had revived the Patriarchate of Peć. Ferhad was the son of Rustem-beg and had brothers Derviš-beg and Ali-beg Sokolović, the sanjakbey of Klis. His brother Derviš-beg died during an Ottoman battle in Georgia while he was serving as the beylerbey of the Diyarbekir Eyalet, Eastern Anatolia. He is first mentioned as the sanjakbey of Klis and was active in battles around Dalmatia.

== Sanjakbey of Klis ==
Ferhad Pasha was governor of the Sanjak of Klis between 1566 and 1574. Nothing much is known of him during his rule in Klis.

== Sanjakbey of Bosnia ==
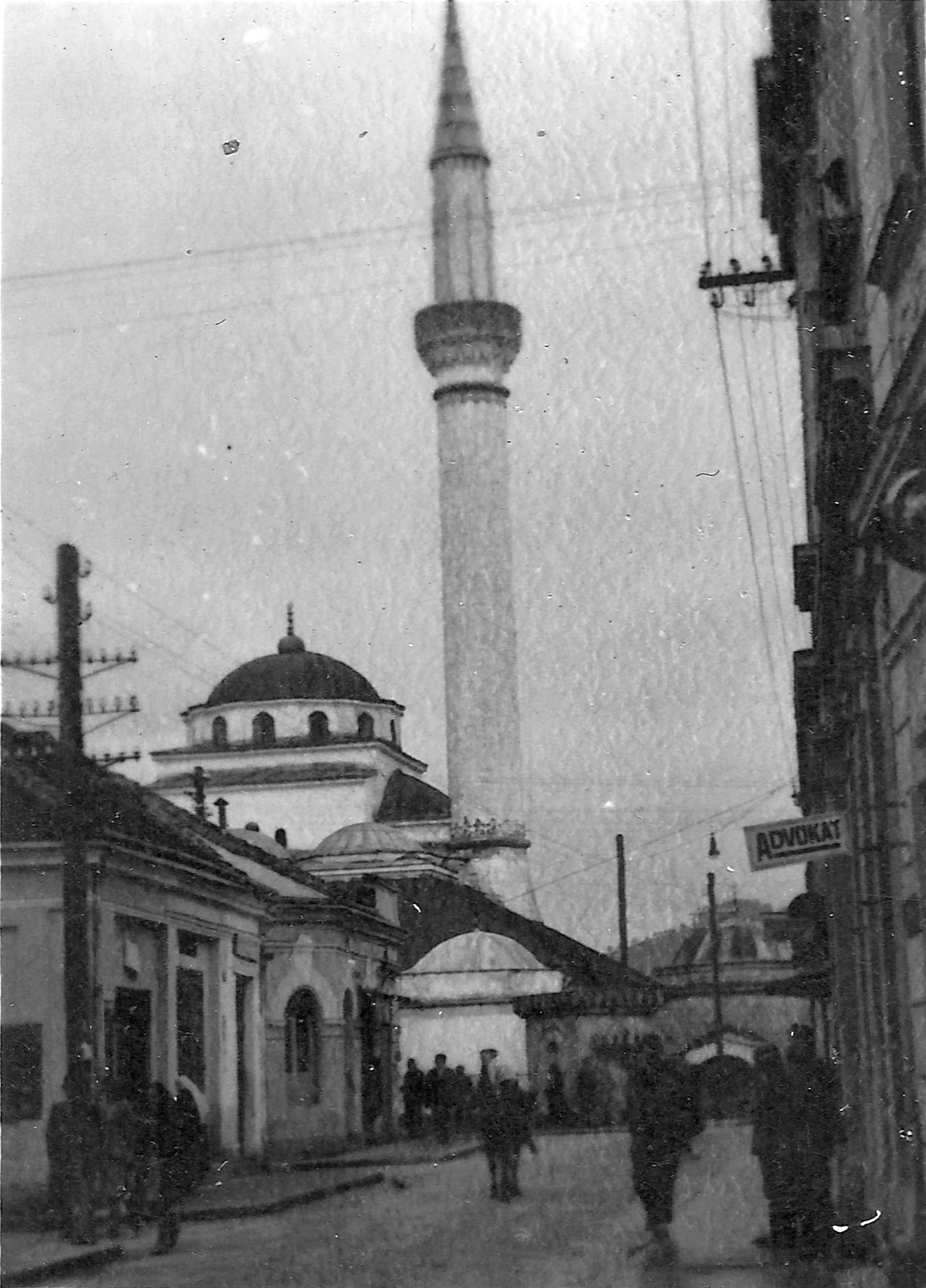
Ferhat Pasha Mosque was destroyed by Serb forces in the city of Banja Luka during the Bosnian War (1992-95).

Then he moved back to Bosnia, and was one of the founding fathers of Banja Luka, the second largest city in modern Bosnia and Herzegovina. There, he built over 200 buildings ranging from artisan and sales shops to wheat warehouses, baths and mosques. Among the more important commissions were the Ferhadija and Arnaudija mosques during whose construction a plumbing infrastructure was laid that served the surrounding residential areas. He moved the seat of Bosnia from Travnik to Banja Luka.

In 1576–77, he conquered the towns of Mutnica, Ostrožac, Podzvizd, Kladuša, Peći, and other towns up to the Kupa River. Already by springtime 1577, he settled Serb families from Serbia to Bosnia around reconstructed towns in those areas to boost the population.

Ferhad reformed Bosnia and made Banja Luka its capital for a couple of decades then it was returned to Sarajevo.

== Beylerbey of Bosnia ==
In 1580 Ferhad reformed Bosnia from a Rumelian Sanjak to its own Eyalet, he became the first governor of the newly formed Bosnia Eyalet, as beylerbey (also referred to as "pasha") which ceded from the Rumelia Eyalet as its own province. The Bosnia Eyalet (or Pashaluk) comprised a total of ten sanjaks: Sanjak of Bosnia (central province), Sanjak of Herzegovina, Sanjak of Vučitrn, Sanjak of Prizren, Sanjak of Klis, Sanjak of Krka, Sanjak of Pojega and Sanjak of Pakrac. The sanjakbey of the Sanjak of Pakrac was Ali-beg, brother of Ferhad Pasha Sokolović.

== Siege of Gvozdansko ==
Ferhad Pasha Sokolović with 10,000 soldiers organized three major assaults and tried to take Gvozdansko Castle in the Kingdom of Croatia in the Habsburg monarchy. Finally, when the Ottomans entered the castle gates, all the defending forces were already dead of wounds, hunger and cold. The Siege of Gvozdansko ended with an Ottoman victory on 13 January 1578. Ferhad Pasha was so moved by their bravery that they were conceded a Christian burial and the local population freed from taxes.

== Death ==
Ferhad died in Buda (Budapest) in the year 1590, he was murdered by one of his slaves. He requested when he died that his body must be moved to Banja Luka the city he himself built from the ground. He was probably buried near his Ferhadija mosque in Banja Luka.

== Annotations ==
1. He was possibly the male first cousin of Sokollu Mehmed Pasha.

== See also ==
- Mehmed Pasha Sokolović
- Mustafa Pasha Sokolović

Political offices
Preceded by Mehmed Bey Sokolović	Governor of the Sanjak of Bosnia (sanjakbey); 1574–1580	Succeeded by Šehsuvar Pasha
First	Governor of the Bosnia Eyalet (beylerbey); 1580–1588	Succeeded by Kara Ali Pasha
