= Province of Bosnia =

Province of Bosnia may refer to:

- Ottoman Empire's provinces of Bosnia:
  - Sanjak of Bosnia (1463–1520)
  - Eyalet of Bosnia (1520–1864)
  - Vilayet of Bosnia (1864–1908)
- Austria-Hungary's Condominium of Bosnia and Herzegovina (1878–1918)
