= Siege of Knin =

Part of the Ottoman wars in Europe Hundred Years' Croatian-Ottoman War

- Part of the Ottoman wars in Europe; Hundred Years' Croatian–Ottoman War
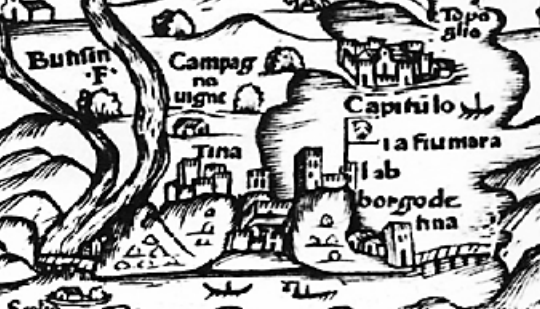
- Knin on a 1522 map
Date	May – 29 May 1522
Location	Knin, Kingdom of Croatia; 44°02′00″N 16°11′00″E
Result	Ottoman victory
Territorial changes	Knin and its surroundings captured by the Ottoman Empire

Belligerents
Ottoman Empire	Kingdom of Croatia

Commanders and leaders
Gazi Husrev-beg	Mihajlo Vojković (surrendered)

Strength
25,000 soldiers	Small garrison

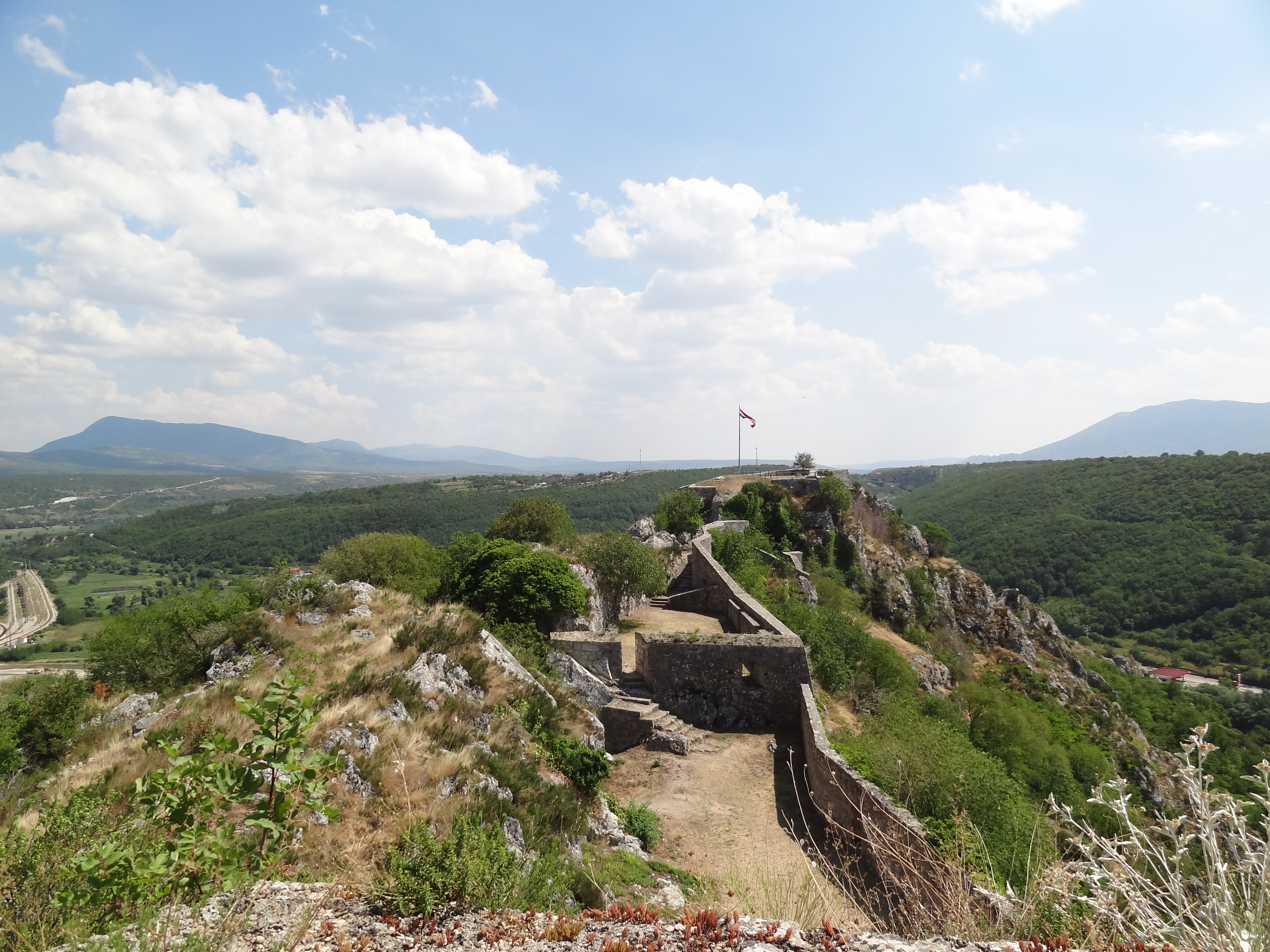
The Fortress of Knin in 2012

The siege of Knin (Croatian: Opsada Knina) was a siege of the city of Knin, the capital of the Kingdom of Croatia, by the Ottoman Empire in 1522. After two failed attempts in 1513 and 1514, Ottoman forces led by Ghazi Husrev Bey, sanjak-bey (governor) of the Sanjak of Bosnia, launched a major offensive on southern Croatia in the spring of 1522. In May, his forces, reinforced with troops from the Sanjak of Herzegovina and Constantinople, besieged the Knin Fortress.

Due to frequent raids of Knin and its surroundings, the fortress was already damaged and a large part of the local population fled to safer parts of Croatia. Croatian nobleman Mihajlo Vojković, the commander of Knin's garrison, only had a small force at his disposal. He surrendered the fortress on 28 May, in exchange for a free departure of his soldiers. The Ottomans entered the city on the following day. Croatian Ban Ivan Karlović, who was preparing a relief effort to help the besieged fortress, had Vojković imprisoned for surrendering the city. After its capture, the Ottomans incorporated Knin into the Croat vilayet within the Sanjak of Bosnia. Around 1580, Knin became the seat of the Sanjak of Krka and Lika, and remained under Ottoman rule until 1688.

== Background ==
In the early 16th century, the Kingdom of Croatia was in a personal union with the Kingdom of Hungary. Its border with the Ottoman Empire formed part of a larger defence system established by King Matthias Corvinus. The southern part of the Croatian sector of the frontier, under the authority of the ban of Croatia, was guarded by three major forts. Along with Skradin and Klis, the fortified city of Knin in northern Dalmatia, positioned on the upper Krka River, kept watch on the neighboring Sanjak of Bosnia. Following the death of King Matthias in 1490, the frontier zone came under increased Ottoman pressure, and frequent raids left the forts isolated.

The Croatian defeat at Krbava field at the hands of the Ottomans in 1493 was preceded by the first Ottoman siege of Knin. The Ottoman army was encamped near Knin prior to the siege. The garrison in Knin underestimated the strength of the Ottoman army, attacked it and suffered a heavy defeat. The Ottomans then besieged the city, but the defenders managed to hold off the attacks. That year saw a large wave of emigration from Knin and its surroundings to safer parts of Croatia. Knin, the capital city of Croatia and the seat of the ban, was slowly losing its status as the political and administrative center of the kingdom. Its supreme court ceased to function, ban's deputy no longer had civil duties, and all efforts were focused on the buildup of Knin's fortifications. The city was also the seat of a Roman Catholic diocese. Due to the Ottoman threat, the bishop of Knin moved to Cazin.

In 1501, Croatian Ban John Corvinus, with Venetian help, planned a larger offensive on the Sanjak of Bosnia from the direction of Knin. The plan was thwarted by a series of Ottoman attacks along the border. In the following year, the Croatian army stationed in Knin participated in a raid into Bosnia. The Ottomans responded with a raid into the area around Knin in September, with 2,600 cavalrymen. On 20 August 1503, King Vladislaus II, who succeeded Matthias Corvinus, concluded a seven-year peace treaty with Sultan Bayezid II. The armistice was used to strengthen Knin's defences in the following year. In 1505, Dalmatia experienced a period of severe famine that affected Knin as well. In 1510, an outbreak of the plague almost halved Knin's population.

A new five-year peace treaty was signed in 1511. Sanjak-beys from Herzegovina and Bosnia did not honour the new ceasefire and were often raiding the countryside of the Croatian border towns. In a report on 5 May 1511 to the parliament in Buda, the master of the treasury, Blaise Ráskai, stated that Knin was continuously targeted by Ottoman assaults and that the entire Kingdom of Croatia would be lost if the city fell. Hungary had its own financial troubles and could not allocate enough resources to help Croatia's defences. The Croatian nobles turned to the Holy See for aid in the war with the Ottoman Empire. Petar Berislavić, the ban of Croatia from 1513 to 1520, received around 50,000 ducats in subsidies from Pope Leo X during his tenure.

Some local Croatian nobles made accommodations with the Ottomans to protect their possessions from raids, in the form of annual tributes to the sanjak-bey of Bosnia. In the councils of 1507 and 1511, the Croatian nobility concluded that if the king did not provide more help, they would be forced to pay tribute to the sultan themselves. Venice reported that their coastal cities in the eastern Adriatic were no longer secure due to local agreements of Croatian forts in the hinterland with the Ottomans. These agreements were contained to a local level and did not lead to a cessation of hostilities.

With the accession of Selim I as sultan in 1512, all peace treaties were annulled. The entire Banate of Srebrenik, one of the defensive provinces established by Matthias Corvinus, was captured in the autumn of the same year. Berislavić, whose tenure was marked with continuous battles with the Ottoman Empire, focused on defending the area around the Una River. In August 1513, he won a great victory against the Ottomans at the battle of Dubica. In May 1520, he was killed in an Ottoman ambush at the battle of Plješevica. Most of the Croatian nobles supported Ivan Karlović, the head of the Kurjaković family, to replace Berislavić. King Louis II, who succeeded Vladislaus II, had second thoughts on that request and the position of ban remained vacant for another year.

== Failed siege attempts ==
Croatia and Ottoman expansion in the region in 1500

In 1510, the captain of Knin negotiated a joint defence with the captain of the Venetian-held coastal city of Šibenik. He reported that Knin was locked down due to the activities of Ottoman irregular soldiers and the lack of reinforcements. In the same year, around 1,000 Ottoman akinji (irregular light cavalry) raided the countryside of Knin. Some contemporary sources mention that the vice ban of Croatia was captured on that occasion. Three years later, in January 1513, there was another siege of Knin. The Croatian ban ordered vice ban Baltazar Baćan (Hungarian: Boldizsár Batthyány) to gather forces and lift the siege with help from the Archdiocese of Zagreb. The ban called for a general uprising in the country on that occasion. The Diocese of Pécs also provided aid. In February of the following year, a 10,000-strong Ottoman army besieged Knin, but was unable to take the fortress and lost 500 troops. The settlement beneath the fortress was burned on this occasion. The Bosnian sanjak-bey constructed two new forts on the border near Skradin in 1517, to aid him in future offensives.

The local population was decimated by war, hunger, plague, and migration to safer places, and the city's economy was hindered by the seizure of crops and livestock. The captains of Knin and Skradin traveled to Buda and offered their resignations in October 1521, explaining that they did not have enough resources to withstand Ottoman assaults. King Louis II and his council persuaded them to remain in their positions, and promised reinforcements of 1,000 infantry and 1,000 cavalrymen, though it is not known how many of these forces arrived to the two captains.

== Prelude and final siege ==
In November 1521, Karlović was named the new ban of Croatia. Shortly after assuming the position, he was faced with an Ottoman takeover of the town of Bužim, following a mutiny of imprisoned Ottoman soldiers. The town had been in possession of Petar Keglević, the ban of Jajce. Karlović led an army to recapture it, and negotiated the surrender of the town in exchange for a free departure of mutineers to Ottoman-held territory. The decision to let the Ottomans leave freely caused a quarrel with Keglević, who opposed such a move and complained about Karlović to King Louis. In March 1522, there were more conflicts on the border. Karlović expected an Ottoman attack on Krupa and Bihać or on the region of Lika. From a captured Ottoman soldier, the ban's forces learned that the Ottomans were preparing a larger offensive, ordered by the new sultan, Suleiman, following his capture of Belgrade in August 1521. The sultan saw the offensive as a punishment for the failure of negotiations with the Croatian nobles, whom he suspected of using the negotiations to gain time.

The offensive was entrusted to Ghazi Husrev Bey, the sanjak-bey of Bosnia, and Mahmud Bey, the sanjak-bey of Herzegovina. Mahmud Bey was the son of Ottoman general and statesman Hersekzade Ahmed Pasha. Husrev Bey was appointed sanjak-bey of Bosnia in September 1521, after he distinguished himself during the siege of Belgrade and earned the title Ghazi. Before coming to Bosnia, he was the sanjak-bey of Smederevo. The offensive began in early April, with coordinated attacks across the Croatian-Ottoman border, and a raid into the neighbouring Archduchy of Austria. Additional Ottoman troops from Constantinople were sent in aid to the two sanjak-beys. Karlović's forces, numbering 2,000 cavalrymen and reinforced with troops from Austria, intercepted and defeated one Ottoman group returning to Bosnia in mid April.

Husrev Bey first led his forces on a raid into Carniola. Other Ottoman units made probing attacks on Knin and Skradin, which were marked as the main targets in the first phase of the offensive. On their return from Carniola, Husrev Bey's forces raided the area around the towns of Grobnik, Ledenik, Brinje, and Modruš, in central Croatia. They reached Knin in May, where Husrev Bey was joined by Mahmud Bey. The two sanjak-beys had an army of 25,000 soldiers and a large amount of artillery. The fortress of Knin was defended by Mihajlo Vojković from Klokoč, a Croatian nobleman who had only a small garrison at his disposal.

Karlović was at the time of the siege located in Topusko, north of Bihać. When he heard the news of the Ottoman attack, he started gathering an army to relieve Knin. Karlović also asked the captains from Austria for assistance. While the ban was preparing an army, the Ottomans launched three assaults against the city. Vojković surrendered the fortress on 28 May, after negotiations with Husrev Bey. Under the agreement, he was granted permission to leave Knin with his men. Ottoman troops entered Knin on the following day. It is not known whether the free departure of the civilian population was part of the agreement. They were probably able to leave freely as well. The Ottomans allowed civilians to remain in their conquered territories if they paid land tax (haraç), which was levied on non-Muslims in the empire.

== Aftermath ==
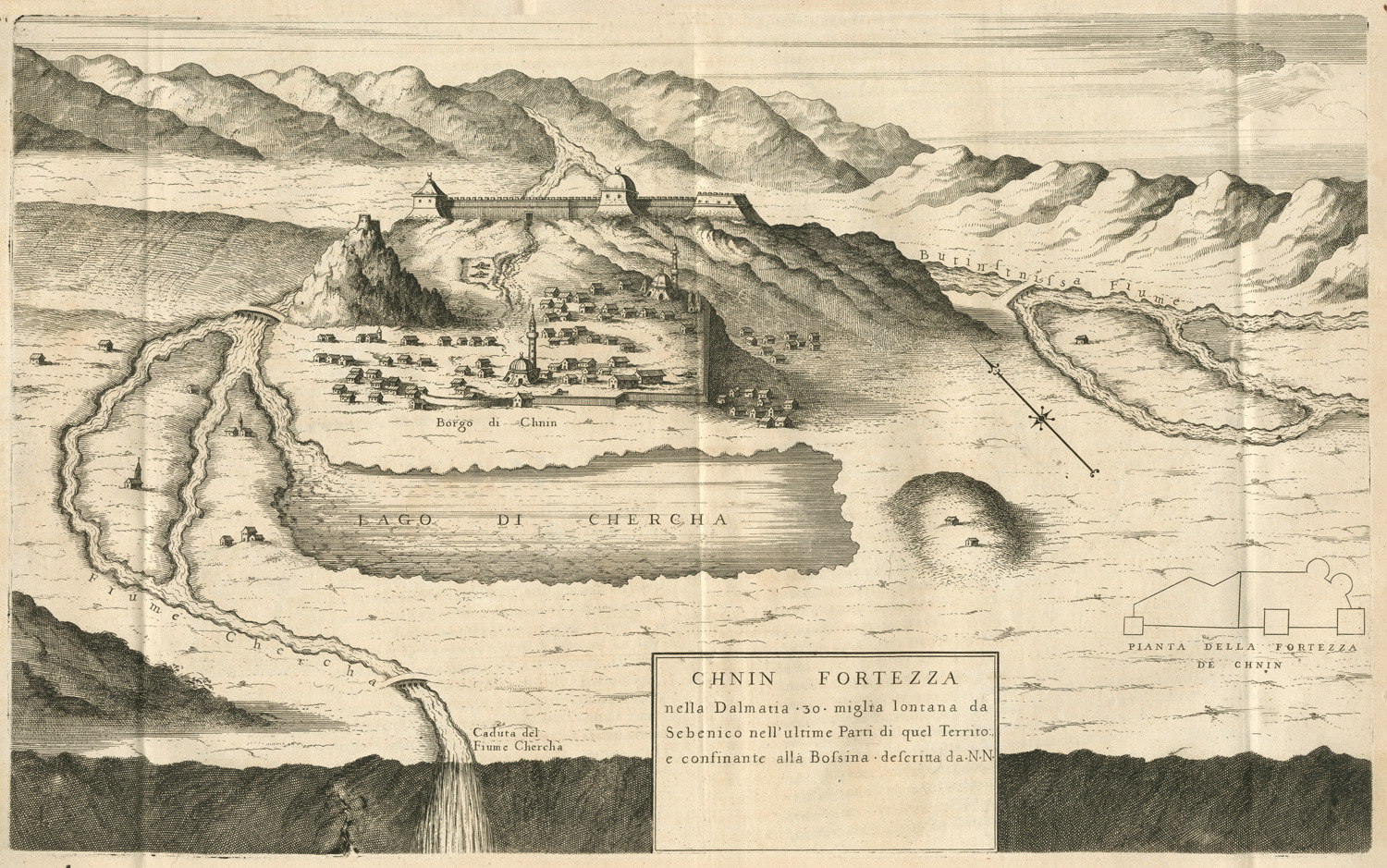
Vincenzo Coronelli's illustration of Knin from the late 17th century, during Ottoman rule

After hearing about the fall of Knin, the citizens of nearby Skradin fled and left the town undefended, which was then taken by the Ottomans without a fight. Husrev Bey did not allow reprisals or looting of the two towns. He remained in Skradin until it was properly fortified, leaving a garrison of 500 men. While in Skradin, Husrev Bey received gifts from the Venetians. He conveyed that the sultan desired peace with Venice. After conquering Knin, the Ottomans moved towards Klis, another important fortified city in southern Croatia. The fortress of Klis, which had a garrison of 300 soldiers, was besieged on 3 June. The garrison was strong enough to repel the attacks of Husrev Bey's men, who had to break the siege and withdrew on 18 June.

Information about the loss of Knin and Skradin arrived to Karlović with a considerable delay. When Karlović found out that Vojković surrendered Knin, he had him arrested and sent to a prison in Udbina. Karlović deprived Vojković of his estates, including the town of Klokoč. Two counts from the Frankopan family, Juraj II and Matija II, seized Klokoč on their own, where they found ammunition and cannons that were reportedly sent by the king to strengthen Knin's defences. Karlović denounced this action as unlawful, which led to an internal conflict with the Frankopans.

The fall of Knin was a huge shock in Croatia, and its loss accelerated the Ottoman advance in the southern part of the kingdom. Bihać now took the leading role in Croatia's defences south of the Sava River. The majority of the local population in the Dalmatian hinterland had already fled by the time of the 1522 offensive. Under Ottoman rule, the Vlach population from other Ottoman territories moved into Knin and its hinterland. They established new shepherd settlements and were recruited into the Ottoman armies as mercenaries. Some of the Vlachs joined the Uskoks, irregular soldiers that waged a guerrilla war against the Ottomans, and allied themselves with Venice when the Candian War broke out. Islamization in the western Dalmatian hinterland had less effect than in other regions, due to its distance, the activities of the Franciscans, and the special status of Vlachs in the Ottoman Empire.

There were several attempts to recapture Knin in the first years following its fall. In September 1522, Karlović gathered an army and attacked Ottoman forces in the vicinity of Knin, capturing several Ottoman soldiers, including the goldsmith of Husrev Bey. Aid was expected from Austrian Archduke Ferdinand, who pledged to help regain the lost forts and strengthen the ones still under Croatian control. In June, Ferdinand sent four hundred troops to Karlović, led by Nicholas, Count of Salm, who met with Karlović and helped in the organisation of the defence. While those forces enabled the Croatians to hold their ground, they were too weak to capture Knin. There were two more Croatian attacks in the area of Knin in 1529 and 1530. The first ended with the capture of 24 Ottoman soldiers, while in the second one in July 1530, around 100 cavalrymen from Bihać reached the area of Knin and the Cetina River, where local Christian troops had been gathered by harambaša Nikola Bidojević. The details of this attack are not known.

The Ottoman Empire made Knin the starting point of their offensives in the area. The city and its surroundings were incorporated into the newly formed Croat vilayet within the Sanjak of Bosnia. Around 1580, the Sanjak of Krka and Lika was formed with Knin as its seat. Knin remained under Ottoman rule until 1688, when it was captured by Venice during the Morean War.
