= Sinan Bey Boljanić =

Sinan Bey of Boljanići (Serbo-Croatian: Sinan-beg Boljanić, died in 1582) was an Ottoman Bosnian official who served as the sanjak-bey of Herzegovina (1552–57, 1563, 1564–67, 1569, 1574–80), and of Bosnia (1562–64). He was born in Boljanići, a village between Pljevlja and Čajniče, at the time part of the Herzegovina Sanjak. His father was Bajram Agha, and he had several siblings, including a younger brother Hüseyin Pasha Boljanić. He married the sister of Grand Vizier Sokollu Mehmed Pasha. He had construction works finished in Čajniče, Njegošević, Sopot, Cernik, Priboj, Međuriječje. He died in 1582 and was buried in his turbe at Čajniče.

Political offices
Preceded by ?	Sanjak-bey of Herzegovina; 1552–57	Succeeded by ?
Preceded by Hasan-beg Sokolović	Sanjak-bey of Bosnia; 1562–64	Succeeded by Mustafa-beg Sokolović
Preceded by Malkoč-beg	Sanjak-bey of Herzegovina; 1563	Succeeded by ?
Preceded by ?	Sanjak-bey of Herzegovina; 1564–67	Succeeded by Husein-paša Boljanić
Preceded by Husein-paša Boljanić	Sanjak-bey of Herzegovina; 1569	Succeeded by ?
Preceded by ?	Sanjak-bey of Herzegovina; 1574–80	Succeeded by ?
