= Hüseyin Pasha Boljanić =

Ottoman official (died 1595)

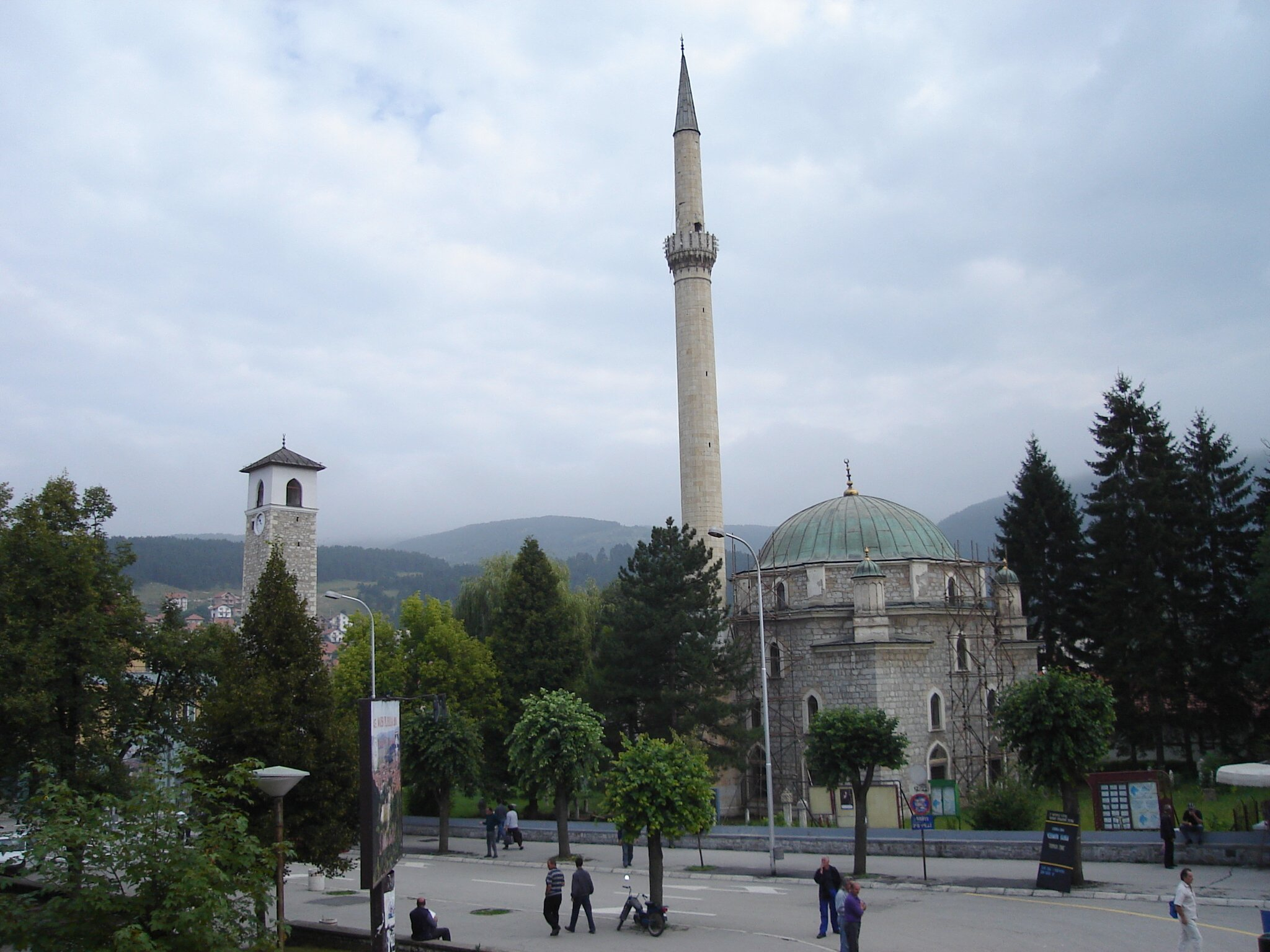
Husein-paša's Mosque in Pljevlja, built by Husein Paša Boljanić. It has the highest mosque minaret in the Balkans outside of Istanbul.

Hüseyin Pasha Boljanić (Turkish: Bodur Hüseyin Paşa, "the Short"; died 1595) was an Ottoman statesman and government official who served in many high-level positions in the Ottoman Empire, including as governor of Bosnia (1594–95), Damascus (1582–83), Diyarbekir, Budin, Aleppo, Van, Anatolia, and of Egypt (1573–74).

== Early life ==
Husein was born in the village of Boljanići close to the town of Pljevlja at the time part of the Sanjak of Herzegovina (now in Montenegro). The family was one of several notable recently converted families in the Herzegovina region. His father, known as Bajram-aga, was a petty lord in his village. He had three brothers, Sinan, Ali, and Daut, and two sisters, Maksuma and Zulkada. Sinan married the sister of Grand Vizier Sokollu Mehmed Pasha and rose in the state hierarchy, becoming sanjak-bey of Bosnia in 1562.

Owing to Mehmed Pasha, who had sent him to be educated at the Enderun, Husein also rose; beginning as the subaşi of the Popovo field, he was the governor of the Sanjak of Herzegovina from March 1567 to March 1569.

He was described and nicknamed as bodur, meaning "short" in Turkish.

== Career ==
After serving as governor of Herzegovina, in March 1569 he became the governor (sanjak-bey) of the Sanjak of Bosnia. He then became the beylerbey of Diyarbekir in 1572. Before long, he became a vizier and was appointed the governor of Egypt Eyalet in 1573. Succeeding Koca Sinan Pasha as the governor of Egypt and only holding the office for around a year, he was described by a European source as "affectionate to men of learning, of a mild and modest disposition, and highly averse to all cruelty."; however, such qualities were anachronistic for that time, as tensions in Egypt between the governor, the sipahis of the army, and the local Mamluks were rising; the same source recounts that violent property crime was common during his term. He then returned to Istanbul in 1574.

Little is known about his life for the ten years between 1575 and 1585, but in 1585, Husein Pasha was appointed the governor of Baghdad Eyalet. In 1594, he was made the beylerbey (or pasha) of the Bosnia Eyalet. After retiring within a few months, he died in 1595.

== Legacy ==
He had the famous Husein-paša's Mosque in Pljevlja built between 1573 and 1594, which still holds the distinction of being one of the largest mosques in Montenegro and having the highest minaret of any mosque in the Balkans, although that was a later addition after his original minaret was struck down by lightning in 1911.

== See also ==
- Husein-paša's Mosque
- List of Ottoman governors of Egypt
- List of Ottoman governors of Damascus
- List of Ottoman governors of Bosnia

== Annotations ==
1. He is known in Serbo-Croatian as Husein-paša Boljanić (Serbian Cyrillic: Хусеин-паша Бољанић). S. Bašagić used the surname Bajramagić.

== Sources ==
- Zlatar, Behija; Pelidija, Enes (1984). "Prilog kulturnoj istoriji Pljevalja Osmanskog perioda" (PDF). Prilozi Za Orijentalnu Filologiju. 34. Archived from the original (PDF) on 2018-02-04.
- Bašagić, Safvet-beg (1900). Kratka uputa u prošlost Bosne i Hercegovine. Sarajevo: Vlastita naklada.
- Sidney, Philip (2012). The Correspondence of Sir Philip Sidney. Oxford University Press. p. 359. ISBN 978-0-19-955822-3.
- Fijuljanin, Muhedin (2010). Sandžački Bošnjaci: monografija. Centar za Bošnjačke Studije. ISBN 978-86-85599-14-9.
- Süreyya, Mehmet (1996) [1890]. Nuri Akbayar; Seyit A. Kahraman (eds.). Sicill-i Osmanî. Beşiktaş, Istanbul: Türkiye Kültür Bakanlığı and Türkiye Ekonomik ve Toplumsal Tarih Vakfı. ISBN 9789753330411.
- Yılmaz Öztuna (1994). Büyük Osmanlı Tarihi: Osmanlı Devleti'nin siyasî, medenî, kültür, teşkilât ve san'at tarihi. Vol. 10. Ötüken Neşriyat A.S. pp. 412–416. ISBN 975-437-141-5.

Political offices
Preceded by Sinan-beg Boljanić	Sanjak-bey of Herzegovina; 1567–69	Succeeded by Sinan-beg Boljanić
Preceded by ?	Sanjak-bey of Bosnia; 1569–1572	Succeeded by ?
Preceded by Koca Sinan Pasha	Beylerbey of Egypt; 1573–1574	Succeeded by Hadim Mesih Pasha
Preceded by ?	Wali of Damascus; 1582–1583	Succeeded by ?
Preceded by Hasan Pasha Predojević	Beylerbey of Bosnia; 1594–1595	Succeeded by Ismail Pasha
