= Sanjak of Travnik =

Sanjak of Travnik (Serbo-Croatian: Travnički sandžak) was a sanjak of the Eyalet of Bosnia during the Ottoman rule in Bosnia and Herzegovina. It was divided into kazas: Travnik, Jajce, Glamoč, Duvno, Livno and Prusac, with the latter changing its capital to Donji Vakuf.

According to the 1870 census, it had a population of 260,199, of which the majority were Muslims, 122,251 or 47,0%, followed by Eastern Orthodox Christians, 70,547 or 27.1%, and Catholics, 65,110 or 25,0%.

== Bibliography ==
- Ramčilović, Zećir (2019). "Demografske promjene nakon Berlinskog kongresa (1878) u Bosni i Hercegovini" [Demographic changes in Bosnia and Herzegovina after the Congress of Berlin (1878)]. Historijski Pregledi (in Bosnian). Tuzla: Centar za istraživanje moderne i savremene historije Tuzla.
