= Sanjak of Krka =

- sanjak of the Ottoman Empire
- 1580–1688
- Coat of arms
- Capital: Knin
- History
  - Establishment of the Bosnia Eyalet: 1580
  - Disestablished: 1688
Preceded by
Sanjak of Klis
Sanjak of Bosnia
Succeeded by
Venetian Republic
Croatian Military Frontier
Sanjak of Bosnia
- Today part of: Croatia; Bosnia

Sanjak of Krka (Turkish: liva Krka, Serbo-Croatian: Krčki sandžak) was a frontier sanjak (serhad) of the Ottoman Empire.

== History ==
In 1580, Ferhad Pasha Sokolović became the first governor (beylerbey or simply pasha) of the Beylerbeylik of Bosnia. The Bosnia Eyalet (or Pashaluk) comprised a total of ten sanjaks: Sanjak of Bosnia (central province), Sanjak of Herzegovina, Sanjak of Vučitrn, Sanjak of Prizren, Sanjak of Klis, Sanjak of Krka, and Sanjak of Pakrac.

The sanjak had territory from Lika to Krbava, and the areas between Zrmanja and Krka, and had its seat in Knin. It was formed out of territories that had been part of the Sanjak of Klis and Sanjak of Bosnia.

The sanjak had c. 30 nahiye.

== Governors ==
- Arnaud Mehmed Memi-beg, first
- stari Memi-beg (?)
- Jusuf-alajbeg (?)
- Halil-beg (?)
- Rustem-beg (?)
- Mustaj-beg/Mustafa-beg (?)
- Halil-beg Alajbegović (?–1647)
- Muhamed Durakbegović (fl. 1675)

== Annotations ==
Sometimes known in Serbo-Croatian historiography as "Sanjak of Krka and Lika" (Krčko-lički sandžak).
