= Siege of Klis =

1536–37 Ottoman victory in Croatia

Siege of Klis Battle of Klis
- Part of the Croatian–Ottoman wars and Ottoman–Habsburg wars
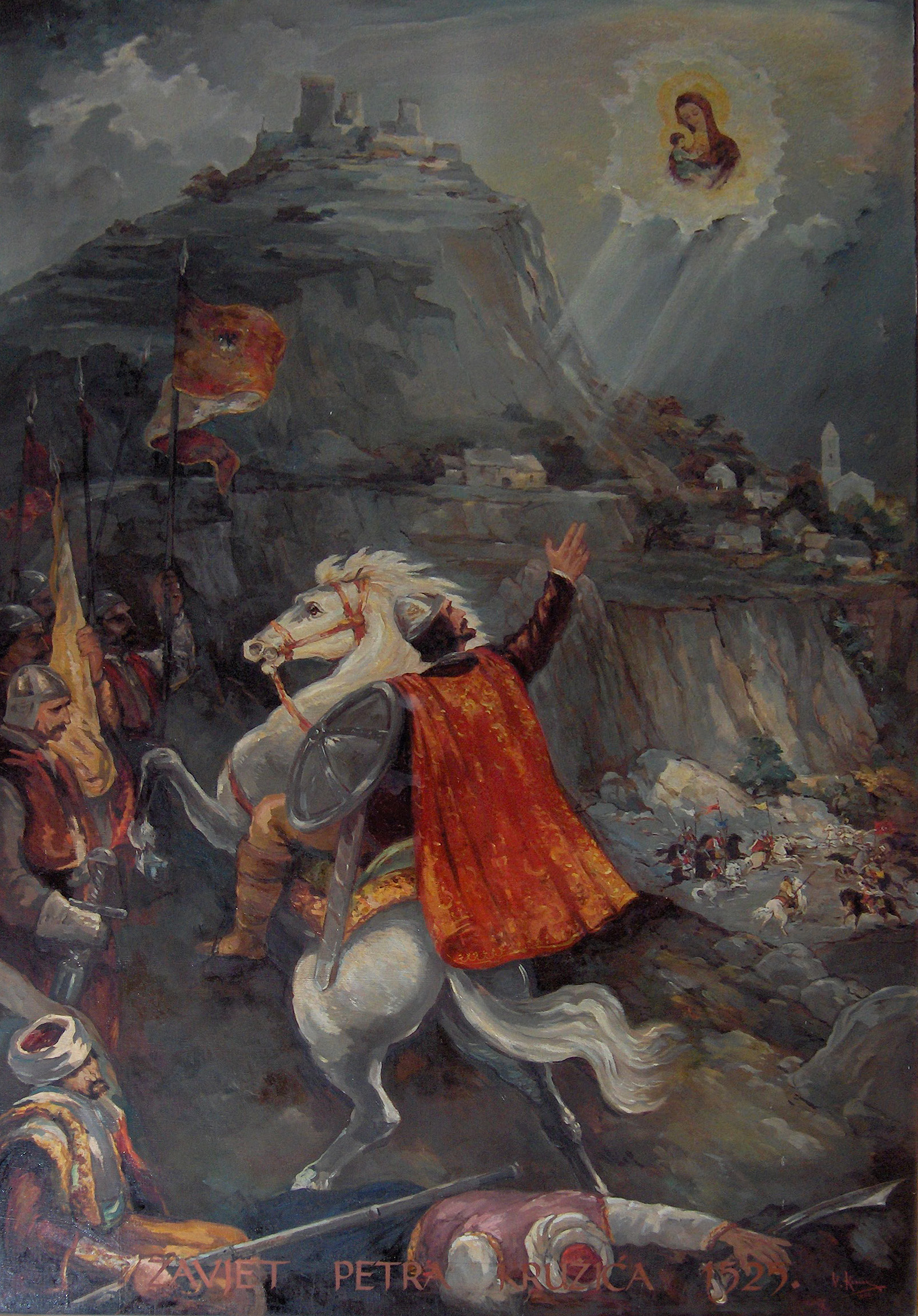
- Petar Kružić fighting the Ottomans
Date	31 August 1536 – 12 March 1537
Location	Klis Fortress, Kingdom of Croatia within Habsburg monarchy (today's Croatia) 43°33′36″N 16°31′26″E
Result	Ottoman victory

Belligerents
Garrison under siege: Kingdom of Croatia; Reinforcements: Kingdom of Croatia (Holy Roman Empire) Holy Roman Empire; Papal States	Siege army: Ottoman Empire Reinforcements: Ottoman Empire

Commanders and leaders
Petar Kružić †; Niccolo dalla Torre; Jacomo Dalmoro d'Arbe	Murat-beg Tardić; Malkoč-beg

Strength
2,300	8,000

Casualties and losses
1,500 killed	1,000 killed

The siege of Klis or Battle of Klis (Croatian: Opsada Klisa, Bitka kod Klisa, Turkish: Klise Kuşatması) was a siege of Klis Fortress in the Kingdom of Croatia within Habsburg monarchy. The siege of the fortress, which lasted for more than two decades, and the final battle near Klis in 1537, were fought as a part of the Ottoman–Habsburg wars between the defending Croatian–Habsburg forces under the leadership of Croatian feudal lord Petar Kružić, and the attacking Ottoman army under the leadership of the Ottoman general Murat-beg Tardić.

After the decisive Ottoman victory at the Battle of Krbava Field in 1493, and especially after the Battle of Mohács in 1526, the Croats continued defending themselves against the Ottoman attacks. The Ottoman conquest during the early years of the 16th century prompted the formation of the Uskoks, which were led by Croatian captain Petar Kružić, also called Prince of Klis. As a part of the Habsburg defensive system, Uskoks used the base at Klis as an important defensive position. They fought almost alone against the Ottomans, and for more than two decades defended the fortress against the Ottoman attacks.

After the final battle, which resulted in an Ottoman victory and in Petar Kružić's death, the Klis defenders, who were lacking in water supplies, finally surrendered to the Ottomans in exchange for their freedom on 12 March 1537. Citizens fled the town, while the Uskoci retreated to the city of Senj, where they continued fighting the Ottoman army. Klis became an administrative centre or sanjak (Sanjak of Klis) of the Bosnia Eyalet, and would remain so for a century.

== Background ==
After the fall of the Kingdom of Bosnia into Ottoman hands in 1463, the southern and central parts of the Kingdom of Croatia remained unprotected, the defense of which was left to Croatian gentry who kept smaller troops in the fortified border areas at their own expense. The decisive Ottoman victory at the Battle of Krbava Field in 1493 shook all of Croatia. However, it did not dissuade the Croats from making more decisive and persistent attempts at defending themselves against the attacks of the much larger enemy. A new wave of Ottoman conquest began in 1521, after which a good portion of Croatia was conquered or pillaged.

On 29 August 1526, at the Battle of Mohács, the Christian forces led by King Louis II were defeated by Ottoman forces led by Sultan Suleiman the Magnificent. Louis was killed in the battle, which resulted in the end of the independent Kingdom of Hungary as he died without an heir. Both the Kingdoms of Hungary and Croatia became disputed territories with claims from both the Habsburg and Ottoman empires. Ferdinand I, Archduke of Austria, a member of the House of Habsburg, the brother of Holy Roman Emperor Charles V and a future Holy Roman Emperor himself, married the sister of Louis II and was elected King by the nobles of both Hungary and Croatia. (Note: The Croatian nobles had convened the 1527 election in Cetin to confirm Ferdinand as their king. The Kingdom of Hungary was embroiled in the Little War at the time.)

Owing to its location, Klis Fortress was an important defensive position during the Ottoman conquest of the Balkans. The fortress stands along the route by which the Ottomans could penetrate the mountain barrier separating the coastal lowlands from around Split, from Ottoman-held Bosnia. The Croat feudal lord Petar Kružić gathered together a garrison composed of Croat refugees, who used the base at Klis both to hold the Ottomans at bay, and to engage in marauding and piracy against coastal shipping. Although nominally accepting the sovereignty of the Habsburg Emperor Ferdinand, who obtained the Croatian crown in 1527, Kružić and his freebooting Uskoks were a law unto themselves.

== Siege ==
=== Failed attempts ===
From 1513, Petar Kružić was one of the commanding officers of Klis Fortress. The Ottomans attempted to conquer the Klis Fortress on several occasions. The first major attempt was by Skender-beg Ornosović in 1515. The Ottomans captured Klis, a village just below the fortress bearing the same name, but the garrison in the fortress above held. Kružić was promoted to captain of the Klis Fortress by the ban Petar Berislavić in 1520. The second major attempt was in 1520, and a year later another attempt was made by Makut-paša, with an additional 2,000 infantry, 50 horsemen, and siege equipment. Another unsuccessful attempt was made in 1522, by Hasan-paša from Mostar and Mehmed-beg Mihalbegović. Later that year, Mihalbegović made another attempt at a siege with 3,000 men, but failed again. During 1523, Klis Fortress was again under attack by the Sultan's army. Attempts were also made by Gazi Husrev-beg in 1526 and 1528, and later in 1531 and 1532.

In 1534, the Ottomans under Mihalbegović laid a months-long siege with a constant concentrated cannonade. Ferdinand urged the Pope to send ships to relieve the Ottoman siege. Although the Ottomans eventually lifted the siege, Ferdinand was displeased that the Pope had provided no assistance in the defense of the fortress. In 1535, the Ottomans tried to seize the fortress by treachery, and again in 1536, but they failed on both occasions. During that year the Ottomans started a new siege which would last until the final fall of the fortress.

When a large Ottoman force threatened the fortress, Kružić appealed to Ferdinand for help, but the Emperor's attention was diverted by an Ottoman attack in Slavonia. Kružić led the defense of Klis, and with his soldiers fought almost alone against the Ottomans, as they repeatedly hurled armies against the fortress. No troops from the Hungarian king arrived, as they were slaughtered by the Ottomans at the Battle of Mohács in 1526, and the Venetians balked at sending any help. Only the pope was willing to provide some men and money.

=== Final battle ===
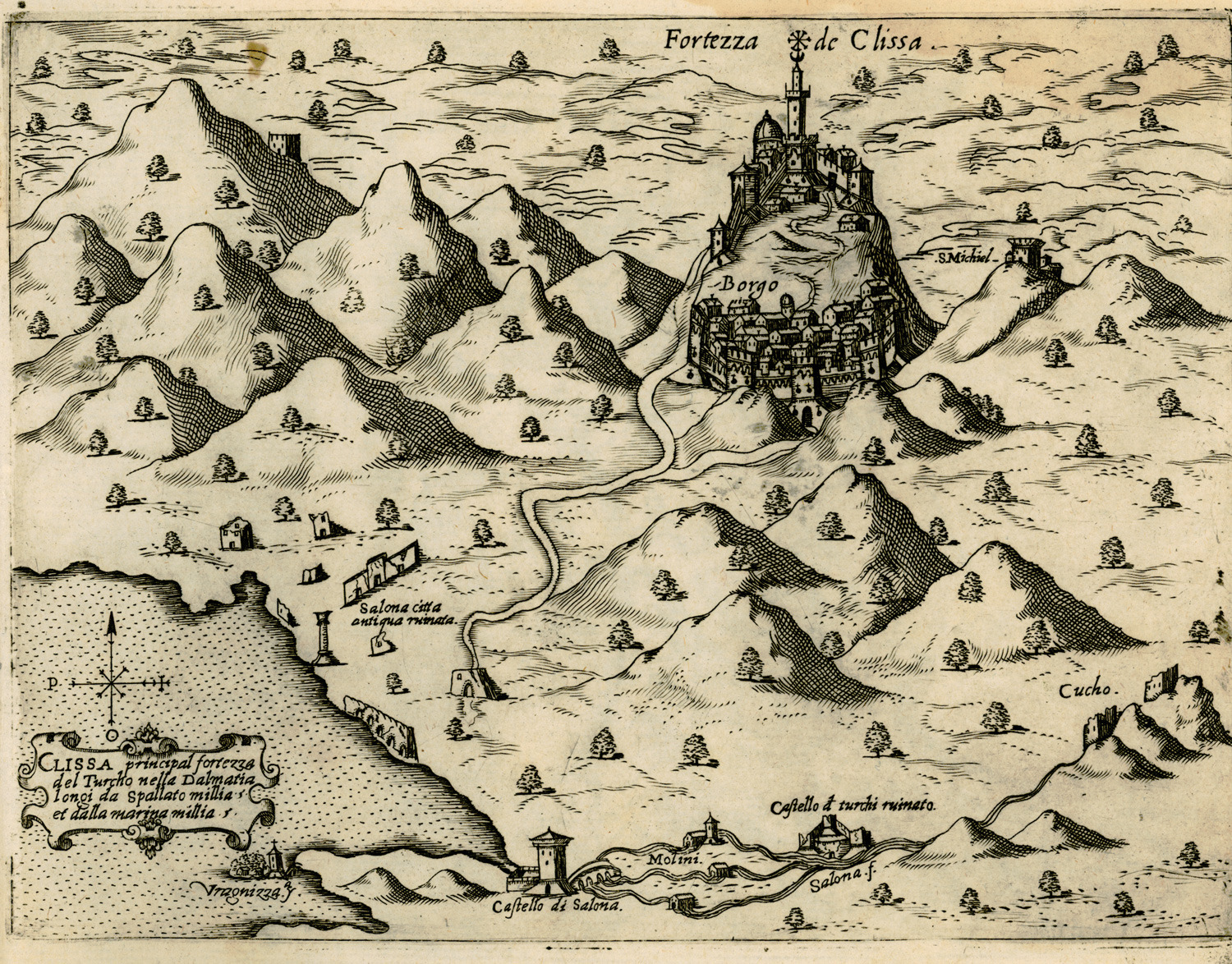
Klis Fortress (16th century)

Pope Paul III claimed some rights in Klis, (Note: According to Theodōros Spandouginos, Papal concern for Klis safety was expressed in a number of documents.) and in September 1536, there was talk in the Curia of strengthening the defenses of the fortress. The Pope notified Ferdinand that he was willing to share the costs of maintaining a proper garrison in Klis. Ferdinand did send aid to Klis and was apparently hopeful of holding the fortress, when the Ottomans again laid siege to it. Ferdinand recruited men from Trieste and elsewhere in the Habsburg lands, and the Pope sent soldiers from Ancona. There were about 3,000 infantry in the reinforcements, which made a sizeable relief force, that were commanded by Petar Kružić, Niccolo dalla Torre, and a papal commissioner Jacomo Dalmoro d'Arbe. On 9 March 1537 they disembarked near Klis, at a place called S. Girolamo, with fourteen pieces of artillery. After Ibrahim's death, Suleiman sent 8,000 men under the command of Murat-beg Tardić (Amurat Vaivoda), a Croatian who had been born in Šibenik, to go and lay siege to Klis fortress (Clissa), and fight against Kružić. An initial encounter of the Christian relief force with the Ottomans was indecisive, but, on 12 March they were overwhelmed by the arrival of a great number of Ottomans.

The attempts to relieve the citadel ended in farce. Badly-drilled reinforcements sent by the Habsburgs fled in fear of the Ottomans, and their attempts to re-board their boats at Solin Bay caused many vessels to sink. Niccolo dalla Torre and the papal commissioner managed to escape. Kružić himself – who had left the fortress to make contact with the reinforcements - was captured and executed; the sight of his head on a stick overwhelmed the remaining defenders of Klis, who were now willing to give up the fortress in return for safe passage north. After Kružić's death, and with a lack of water supplies, the Klis defenders finally surrendered to the Ottomans in exchange for their freedom, on 12 March 1537. Many of the citizens fled the town, while the Uskoci retreated to the city of Senj, where they continued fighting the Ottoman army.

== Aftermath ==
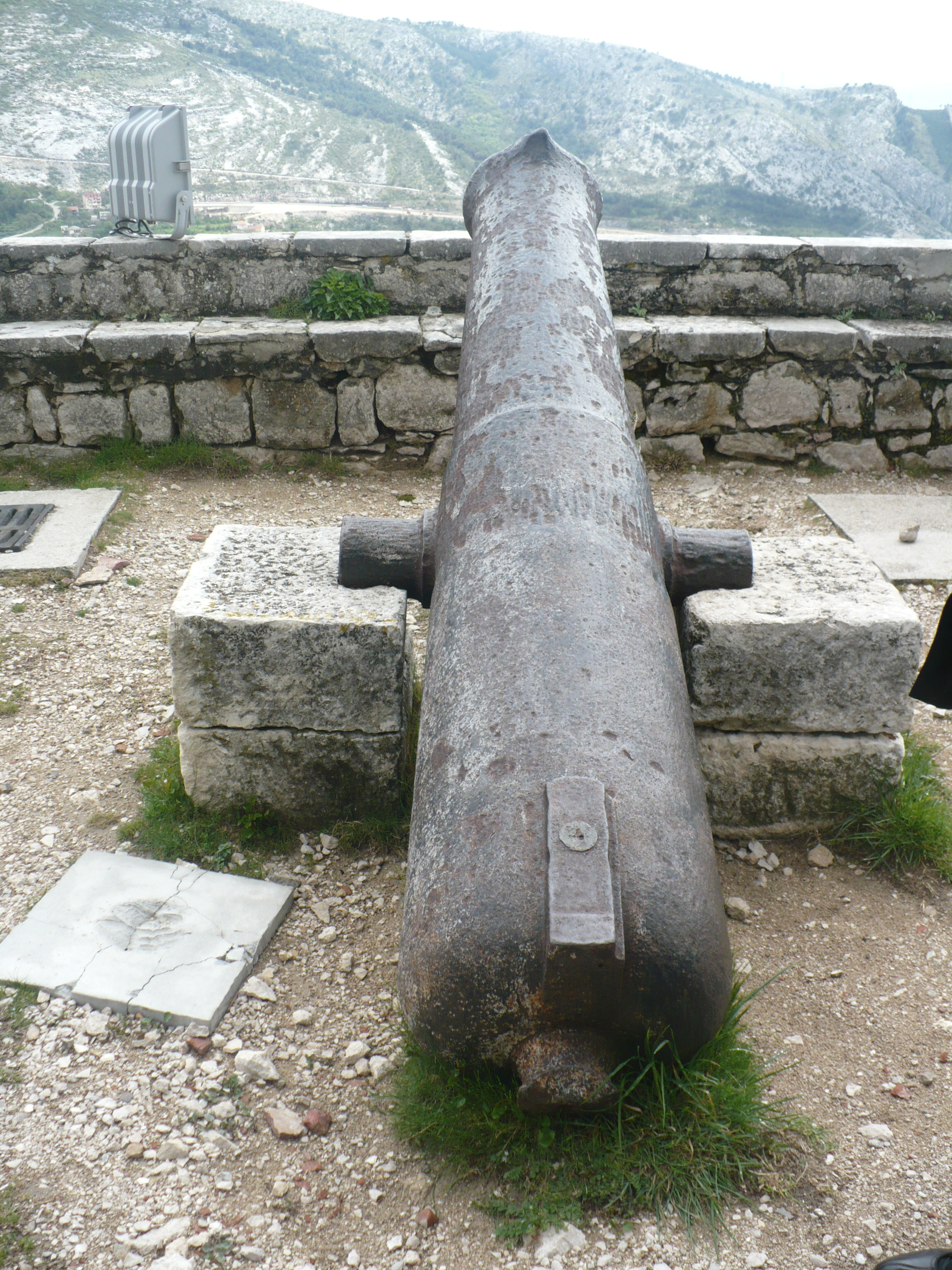
Cannon in the Klis Fortress

During the Ottoman wars in Europe, Klis Fortress became an administrative centre or sanjak (Kilis Sancağı) of the Bosnia Eyalet, and would remain so for a century. As the first Sanjak-Beg of Klis, Murat-beg Tardić built a notable mosque inside the Klis Fortress. That same year, the Ottoman forces took Vrana, while Nadin and Perušić fell in 1538.

Months after the fall of Klis, the Ottoman–Venetian War of 1537-1540 started, and in that war, as well as the Ottoman–Venetian War of 1570-1573, the Ottomans took much of the Dalmatian hinterland near Šibenik and Zadar. On 7 April 1596, Split noblemen Ivan Alberti and Nikola Cindro, along with Uskoci, Poljičani, and Kaštelani irregulars, organized a liberation of Klis. Assisted by dissident elements of the Ottoman garrison, they succeeded. Mustafa-beg responded by bringing more than 10,000 soldiers under the fortress. General Ivan Lenković, leading 1,000 Uskoci, came in relief of the 1,500 Klis defenders. During the battle, Ivan Lenković and his men retreated after he was wounded in battle, and the fortress was lost to the Ottomans on 31 May. Nevertheless, this temporary relief resounded in Europe and among the local population.

The Venetians fought for decades before they finally managed to re-take Klis. During the Cretan War of 1645-1669, the Venetians in Dalmatia enjoyed the support of the local population, particularly the Morlachs (Morlacchi). Venetian commander Leonardo Foscolo seized several forts, retook Novigrad, temporarily captured the Knin Fortress, and managed to compel the garrison of Klis Fortress to surrender.

== See also ==
- Timeline of Croatian history
- Battle of Klis (1596)

== Notes ==
Footnotes

Citations
