= Sanjak of Klis =

Sanjak of Klis Kilis Sancağı
- Sanjak of the Ottoman Empire
- 1537–1826
- Coat of arms
- Capital: Klis (1537–1648); Livno (1648–1826)
- History
  - Siege of Klis: 12 March 1537
  - Disestablished: 1826
Preceded by
Vilayet Croats
Kingdom of Croatia (Habsburg)
Succeeded by
Republic of Venice
Sanjak of Bosnia
Sanjak of Krka
- Today part of: Croatia; Bosnia and Herzegovina

The Sanjak of Klis (Turkish: Kilis Sancağı; Serbo-Croatian: Kliški sandžak) was a sanjak of the Ottoman Empire with its seat being the Fortress of Klis (modern-day Croatia). The town of Livno became its capital after the fortress was captured by Republic of Venice in 1648.

== Background ==
The Sanjak of Klis was established on 12 March 1537, after Ottoman victory in the Siege of Klis. Klis was stronghold of Uskoks and thorn in both Venetian and Ottoman side. It was captured by Ottoman forces commanded by Murat Beg Tardić on behalf of Gazi Husrev-beg who was the sanjakbey of the Sanjak of Bosnia.

== Administrative division ==
The territory of the Sanjak of Klis was composed of the newly captured territories of western Bosnia, Dalmatia (with rivers Cetina, Krka and Zrmanja), Lika and Krbava. The former Croatian vilayet disappeared after being incorporated into the newly established Sanjak of Klis in 1537.

The first land survey of the Sanjak of Klis was done in 1540 within the survey of the Sanjak of Bosnia. The defter of 1550 is the oldest preserved defter of the Sanjak of Klis. This early 15th century defters show that the territory of this sanjak was depopulated. The Ottomans populated barren lands with fresh wave of herdsmen.

The Sanjak of Klis was part of the Bosnia Eyalet since it was established in 1580, as described by famous Ottoman traveler Evliya Çelebi.

== Governors ==
Murat-beg Tardić was appointed as the first sanjakbey of the Sanjak of Klis. Tardić remained on that position until 1544 when he was appointed to position of the sanjakbey of the Sanjak of Požega. Malkoč-beg died in 1545 as sanjakbey of Klis. Sinan, a son of sultan's wife and sanjakbey of the Sanjak of Klis, died in 1593 in a battle. In 1596 sanjakbey was Mustafa-pasha Pijade-pašić. In period 1609 — 1615 sanjakbey was Zulfikar-pasha Atlagić whose successor Piri-pasha killed him in 1616. In 1645 sanjakbey was Miralem who was Albanian. In 1648 sanjakbey was Mehmed Mustajbegović who lost Klis to Venetians.
