= Husein-paša's Mosque =

Mosque in Pljevlja, Montenegro

Huseyin-pasha's Mosque
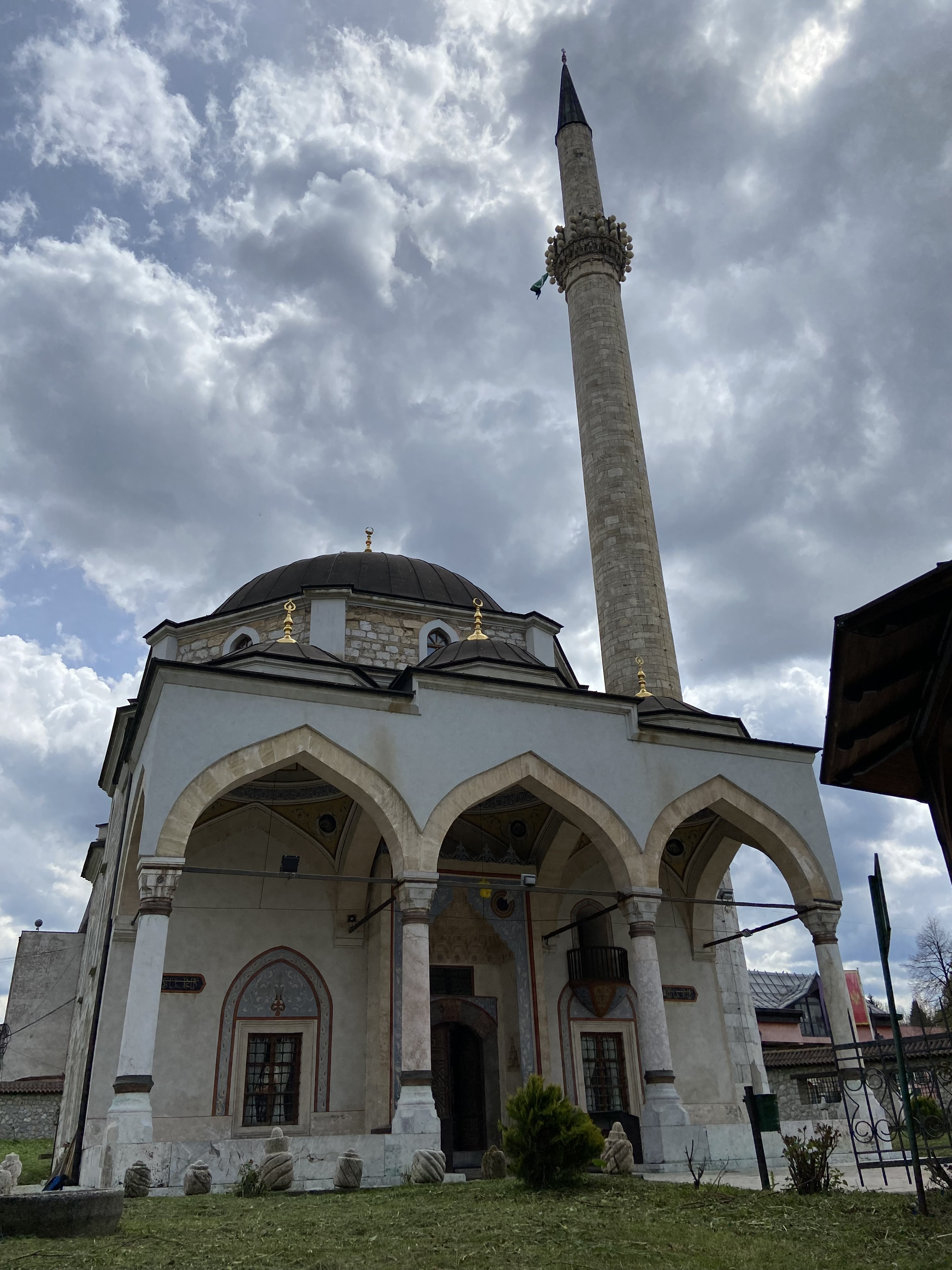

- Location within Montenegro

Location
- Location: Pljevlja, Montenegro
- Interactive map of Huseyin-pasha's Mosque
- Coordinates: 43°21′24.0″N 19°21′30.0″E

Architecture
- Type: Mosque
- Style: Ottoman architecture

Husein-paša's Mosque (Bosnian: Хусеин-пашина џамија, romanized: Husein-pašina džamija) is a well-known mosque in Pljevlja, Montenegro. It was built between 1573 and 1594. It was named after Husein-paša Boljanić who was born in the village of Boljanići, which is close to Pljevlja. It has one of the highest minarets in the Balkans. It is regarded as one of the most beautiful sacral monuments of Islamic architecture in Montenegro.

== Design ==
The mosque has a square basis above which there rises a low-pitched dome set on a cubiform pedestal. An open porch covered with three small domes was formed in front of the main façade. A minaret was added close to the southern side. After it being struck by lightning in 1911, it was rebuilt into a slimmer and higher one, which is now the highest minaret in the Balkans.

== Interior ==
The interior of the mosque and the porch are decorated with rich, in polychrome painted ornaments with floral motifs and quotations from Quran. Mihrab, mimber and mahvil abound in ornaments made in stalactites and in customary Turkish perforations.

== Sources ==
- Historical Lexicon of Montenegro, Book 3, - "Daily News-Press", Podgorica 2006.
