= Duganli Malkoç Bey =

Malkoç Bey
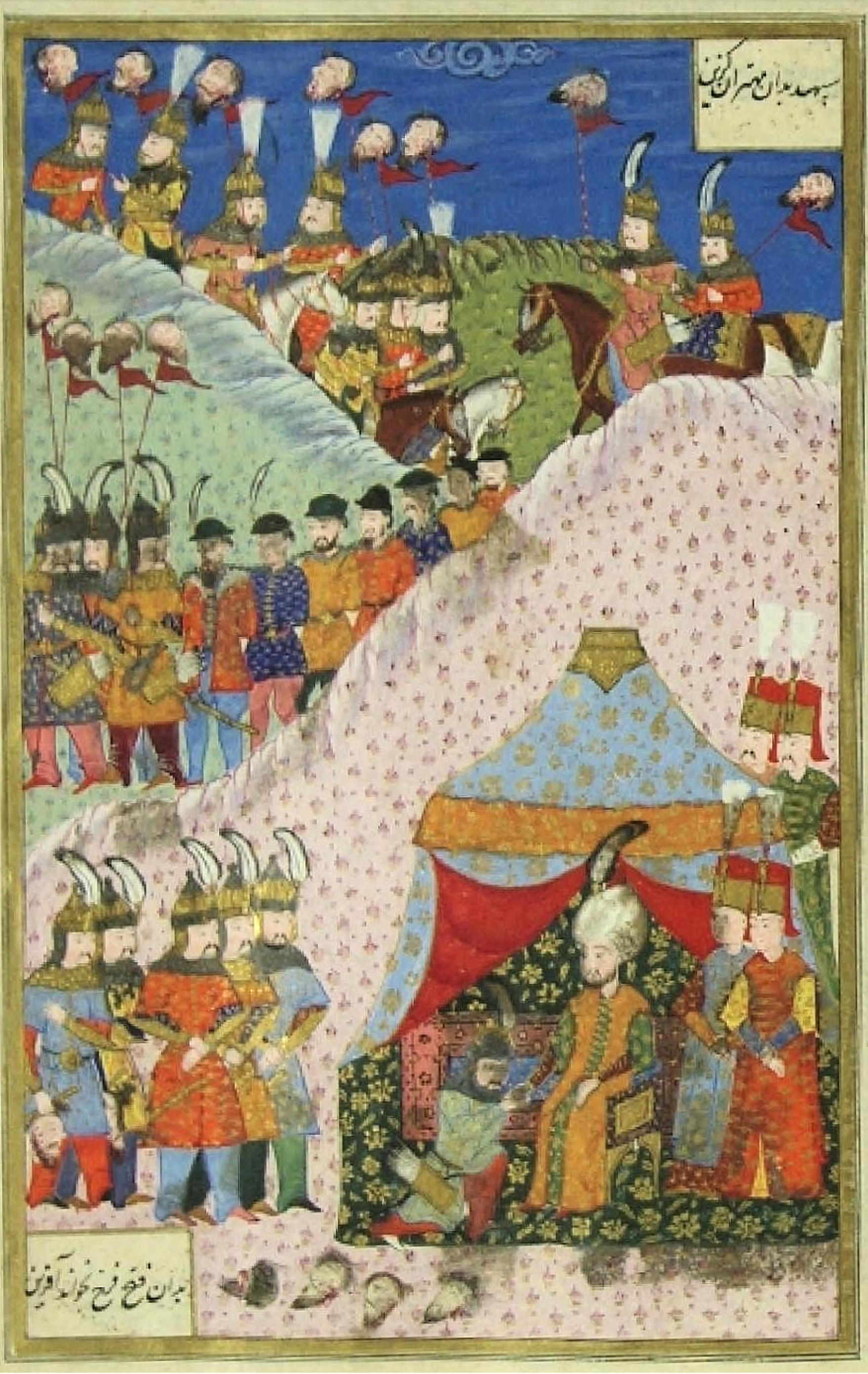
- Malkoč Bey pays his respects to Sokollu Mehmed Pasha in 1552. Futūhāt-i jamīla, 1557-58 (TSMK H.1592).
- Born: Malkoç
- Died: 1565
- Military career
- Allegiance: Ottoman Empire
- Rank: sanjak-bey
- Nickname: Duganli

Duganli Malkoç Bey (Serbo-Croatian: Malkoč-beg Karaosmanović; died in 1565) was an Ottoman Bosnian military officer, the first governor of the Croatian vilayet. He participated in the siege of Klis, and was later appointed as sanjak-bey of the Sanjak of Klis.

== Family ==
Malkoč-beg was the son of Kara Osman-beg, captain of the Ottoman cavalry military units and sanjakbey of the Sanjak of Herzegovina whose türbe is in Kopčić near Bugojno.

Some authors adopted view of Safvet-beg Bašagić that Malkoč-beg Karaosman, originally from a village near Prozor, which is disputed by some other authors. According to some incomplete documents some of the descendants of Malkoč-beg received ziamet in Duge, hence the last name, or Dulali which was how their descendants were referred to.

Malkoč-beg had seven sons (Džafer, Osman, Omer, Ibrahim, Alija, Husein and Hasan) and one daughter (Hani).

In the 1563 defter of the Sanjak of Pakrac it is mentioned that the captain of the region around river Sava was Husein, son of Malkoč-beg. According to Evliya Çelebi, Ibrahim built a mosque in Donji Vakuf. Together with his sons Džafer and Husein, Malkoč-beg fought against Christian armies on the territory between rivers Una and Kupa. Because of his successful conquests he was promoted to the position of sanjakbey. In 1562 he personally wrote a document in Dubrovnik, as sanjakbey of the Sanjak of Herzegovina.

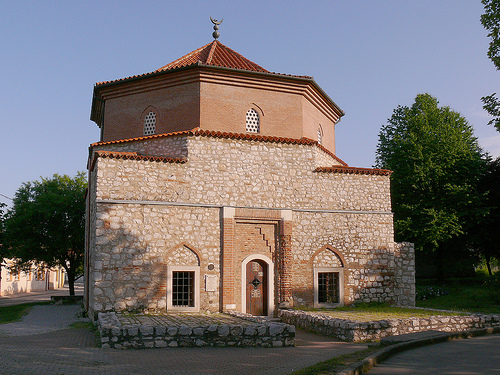
Mosque built by Malkoč-beg in Siklós, Hungary

According to Šabanović, Malkoč-beg died on 26 October 1565 in Banja Luka, where he was buried beside his son Džafer-beg who died five years earlier. According to Mazalić, Malkoč-beg died in 1562 in Pécs and was buried in the grave of his father Kara Osman-beg.

== Annotations ==
- Malkoč-beg Karaosman. He is also known as Karaosmanović.

== See also ==
- Malkoçoğlu family
