= Croatian vilayet =

European polity

Croatian Vilayet Vilayet-i Hırvat
- Borderland of the Ottoman Empire
- 1520s–1537
- Coat of arms
- Capital: Sinj
- History
  - Ottoman conquest of parts of Dalmatia: 27 June
  - Annexation to the Sanjak of Klis: 1537
Preceded by	Succeeded by
Kingdom of Croatia; Republic of Venice	Sanjak of Klis
- Today part of: Croatia

The Croatian Vilayet (Croatian: Vilajet Hrvati, Ottoman Turkish: vilâyet-i Hırvat) was a temporary borderland entity in Dalmatia in the 16th century. Its capital was Sinj.

== Establishment and territory ==
Immediately after the Ottoman capture of the Dalmatian hinterland and Lika from the Kingdom of Croatia and the Republic of Venice in the 1520s, they organized it as a borderland entity and named it the Vilayet of "Croats" (Turkish: Hırvat, Croatian: Hrvati). The southern border of the territory of this vilayet was river Cetina while north-western border was Lika and river Zrmanja. It also included region around river Krka. This territory was administratively governed as the Croatian vilayet which belonged to the Sanjak of Bosnia and listed as such in its 1530 defter (tax registry).

== Administration ==
The capital of the vilayet was Sinj. Its territory was under the jurisdiction of the Skradin kadiluk. Aličić claimed that territories of the Croatian vilayet and Skradin kadiluk were the same and that the official Ottoman administrative unit, Croatian vilayet, was under administrative-judicial jurisdiction of Skradin.

In 1528 the Croatian vilayet and kadiluk of Skradin had the following nahiyahs:

- Sinj and Cetina
- Dicmo
- Zminje Polje
- Vrhrika
- Petrovo Polje and Petrova Gora (with seat in Drniš)
- Kosovo
- Nečven
- Strmica
- Plavna Popina
- Knin
- Grahovo
- Zečevo
- Skradin
- Zrmanja
- Ostrovica
- Benkovac
- Bukovica
- Kličevac
- Karin
- Nadin
- Obrovac
- Podgorje

The first governor of the Croatian vilayet was Malkoč-beg. Around 1537 the governor of the Croatian vilayet was Mahmud Bey. Many soldiers from the vilayet participated at the Battle of Mohács. Most of the Ottoman soldiers registered before the battle were labelled as Bosnians or Croats, designating the territory they were recruited at. All of them had Muslim names, which proves that the process of Islamization of the newly conquered population was much faster than earlier assumed.

The Croatian vilayet was disestablished when it was annexed by the newly established Sanjak of Klis in 1537.

== Annotations ==
1. In Turkish, it was named vilayet-i Hırvat. In English translation, it is called "Croatian vilayet" or "Croat vilayet". It is also called "vilayet Croats" in a Croatian English-language journal. In Serbo-Croatian, it is called vilajet Hrvati.

== Sources ==
- Fine, John V. A. (2010). When Ethnicity Did Not Matter in the Balkans: A Study of Identity in Pre-Nationalist Croatia, Dalmatia, and Slavonia in the Medieval and Early-Modern Periods. University of Michigan Press. ISBN 978-0-472-02560-2.
- Moačanin, Nenad (2006). Town and Country on the Middle Danube: 1526-1690. BRILL. ISBN 90-04-14758-6.
