= Murat Bey Tardić =

Murat Bey Tardić or Murad-beg Tardić (Croatian: Murat-beg Tardić or Murad-beg Tardić; also Amurat Vaivoda) was an Ottoman general.

== Biography ==
Tardić was born to a Croatian family in Šibenik, where he had a brother called Zorzi or Juraj. As a young man he became a prisoner of war. After being released he converted to Islam and entered the Ottoman military serving under Gazi Husrev Bey as his vojvoda, where he quickly rose through the ranks. As a close associate of Gazi Husrev Bey, he led numerous military conquests against the Croatian army in northern Bosnia and Croatia. In 1528, Murat Bey led the conquest of Jajce.

In 1536, Murat Bey Tardić was charged by Suleiman the Magnificent with 8,000 men to lay siege to the Klis Fortress under Petar Kružić. He was successful in the Siege of Klis, occupying it in 1537. For his military services he was put in charge of the Klis Sanjak with the title Beg. As the first Sanjak-Bey of Klis, he built a notable mosque in the town which still stands today.

He was later made the beg of the Sanjak of Pojega in 1541 or in 1543. He is believed to have died in May 1545. He was buried in one of the two mausoleums (türbe) next to the Gazi Husrev Bey Mosque in Sarajevo. Bosnian-American author Aleksandar Hemon and others infer a lover relationship between Tardić and Gazi Husrev Bey.
