= Sanjak of Pojega =

Administrative territorial entity in the Ottoman Empire, in present-day Croatia

Sanjak of Pojega Pojega Sancağı Požeški sandžak
- Sanjak of the Ottoman Empire
- 1538–1699
- Coat of arms
- Capital: Pojega (Požega)
- History
  - Established: 1538
  - Disestablished: 1699
| Succeeded by |
| Kingdom of Slavonia; Slavonian Military Frontier |
- Today part of: Croatia

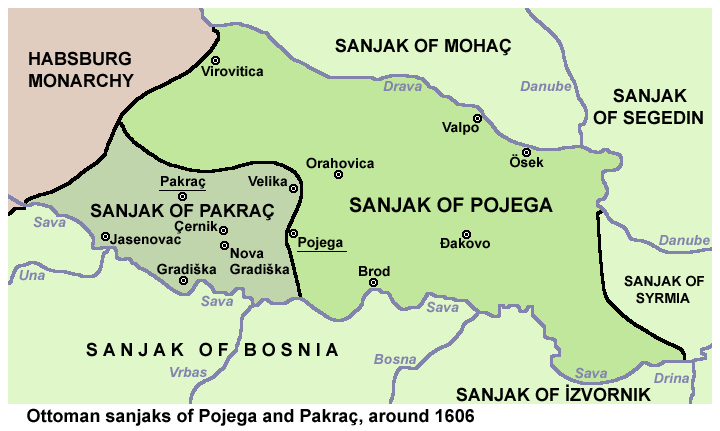
Map of the Sanjak of Pojega in 1606

The Sanjak of Pojega (Turkish: Pojega Sancağı; Croatian: Požeški sandžak) was an administrative territorial entity of the Ottoman Empire formed around 1538. It existed until the Treaty of Karlowitz (1699), when the region was transferred to the Habsburg monarchy. It was located in present-day eastern Croatia, in the Slavonia region. The capital of the sanjak was Pojega (Croatian: Požega).

== History ==
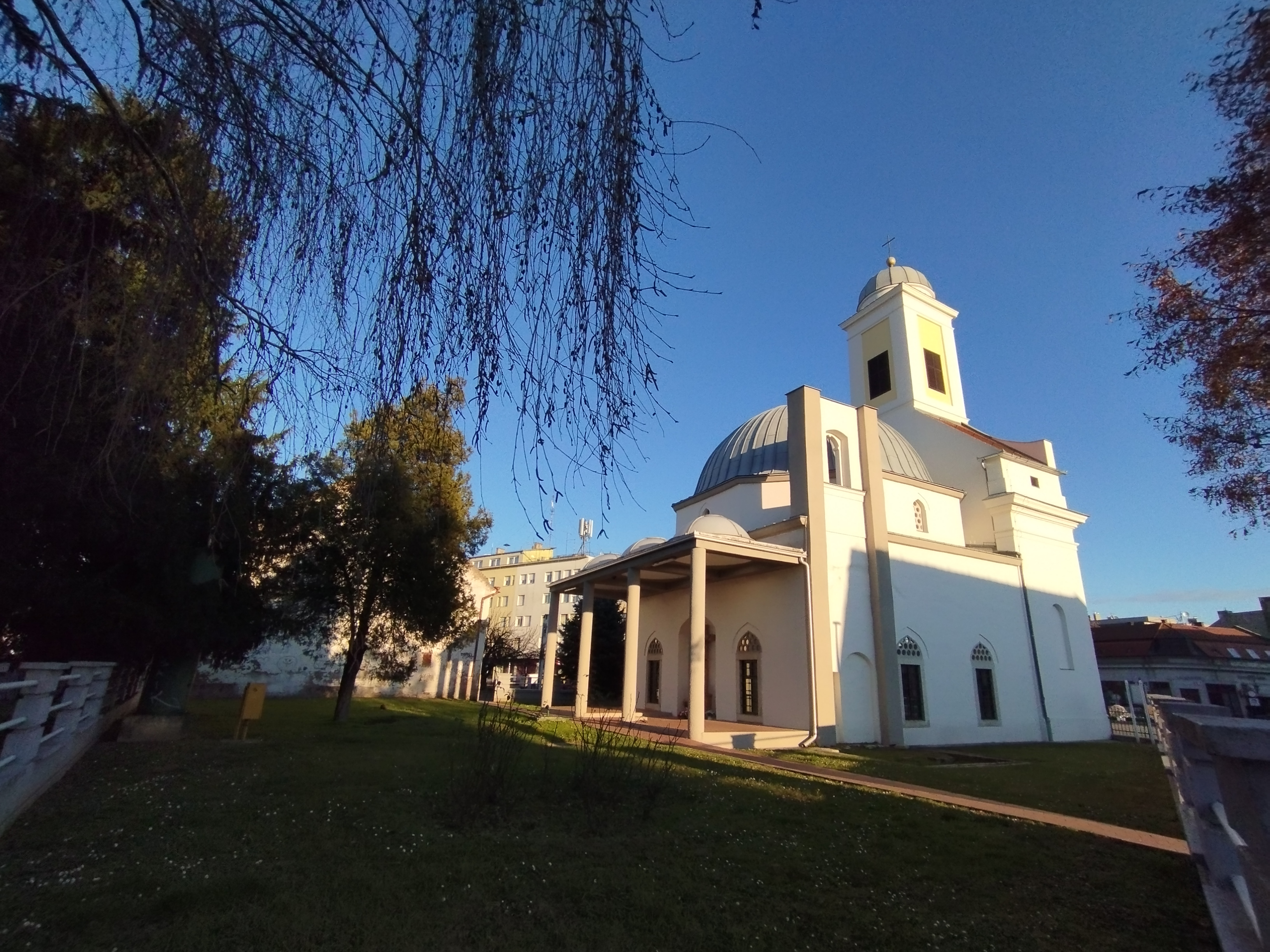
Church of the All Saints (former Ottoman era mosque) in Đakovo

The city of Požega was taken by Yahyapaşazade Mehmed Bey [tr], the Sanjakbey of Semendire (Smederevo), most likely on January 15, 1537, and the citadel was taken ten days later. By early 1538, the Sanjak of Pojega was created and, after the Battle of Gorjani, Mehmed Bey's son Arslan [tr] was appointed the first sanjakbey. The first defter in the sanjak was held in 1540.

The Sanjak of Pojega included territory between Sava and Drava rivers and at first was part of the Rumelia Eyalet. In 1541, it was included into Budin Eyalet, in 1580 into Bosnia Eyalet, in 1596 into Zigetvar Eyalet, and in 1600 into Kanije Eyalet. The Sanjak of Požega was one of six Ottoman sanjaks with most developed shipbuilding (besides sanjaks of Smederevo, Nicopolis, Vidin, Zvornik and Mohács). Toward Croatian and Slavonian border the Ottomans populated numerous Christian Vlachs, who either already lived there or who were brought from Ottoman (Serbian) territories, to live between their border garrisons. Turks to deserted area of Požega Valley settled Orthodox Vlachs from Bosnia. Part of the Croats who remained in that area converted to Islam while part accepted the Ottoman rule without converting to Islam. Indigenous Croatian population and Hungarians as taxpayers in Srijem and Slavonia 1555 are called Vlachs. Part of the colonists came from area south of the Sava, especially from the Soli and Usora areas, continuing the process which already started after 1521. At beginning of the 17th century it seems that there was a new wave of colonization, about 10,000 families which are assumed to come from Sanjak of Klis or with less possibility from area of Sanjak of Bosnia. Because of the substantial number of Vlachs, parts of the Sanjak of Pakrac and Sanjak of Požega were referred to as Mala Vlaška (English: Little Wallachia). It is estimated that in year 1600 were 15,000 Muslims in that area. According to academician Mirko Marković most of Požega Muslims come from Islamized Croats.

However, triggered by the last administrative changes, a mutiny started in Pojega in 1611. Mutineers requested that Sanjak of Pojega should be returned to the jurisdiction of the Bosnia Eyalet. Because of the mutiny, the decision from 1600 was changed and Sanjak of Pojega became a condominium shared between Bosnia and Kanije eyalets.

After the Ottoman defeat in the Battle of Slankamen (1691), the 1699 Treaty of Karlowitz transferred territory of the sanjak to the Habsburg monarchy, thus the Sanjak of Pojega ceased to exist. The last sanjak-bey of the Sanjak of Pojega was Ibrahim-pasha.

== See also ==
- Subdivisions of the Ottoman Empire
