= Sanjak of Pakrac =

Ottoman subdivision

Pakrac Sancağı Pakrački Sandžak
- Sanjak of the Ottoman Empire
- 1552/1557–1699
- Coat of arms

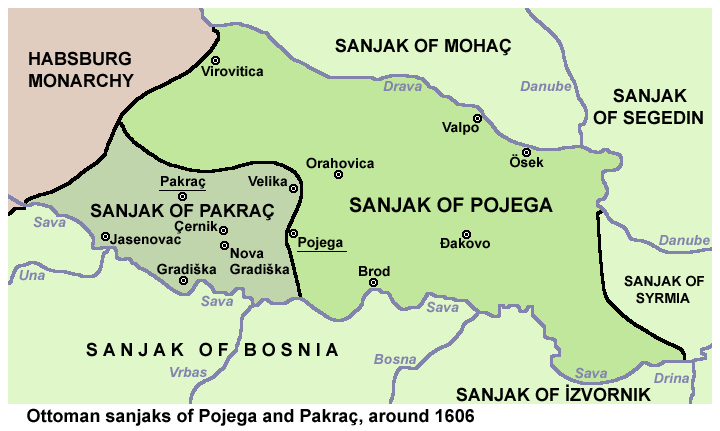
- Map of the Sanjak of Pakrac in 1606
- Capital: Zaçasna (1552–1559); Pakrac (1559–1601); Çernik (1601–1691)
- History
  - Solidification of the Ottoman conquest of Slavonia: 1552/1557
  - Habsburg annexation of Slavonia after the Treaty of Karlowitz: 1699
Preceded by	Succeeded by
Habsburg monarchy	Habsburg monarchy
- Today part of: Croatia

The Sanjak of Pakrac (Croatian: Pakrački sandžak) or Sanjak of Čazma or Sanjak of Cernica was one of the sanjaks of the Ottoman Empire whose capital was first Zaçasna and then Pakrac and Cernik in Ottoman Slavonia. It was established after the Ottomans captured Slavonia in the mid 16th century.

== Background ==
The Ottomans captured Pakrac in 1543. Its territory was not immediately established as separate sanjak. Until 1544 it first belonged to the Kobašu kadiluk of Bosnian sanjak by 1544. In 1544 the Ottomans established kadiluk in Velika to which this territory was ceded. Only in second half of the 16th century they established a kadiluk in Pakrac.

== History ==
The Sanjak of Pakrac was established in 1552 or 1557. Its first capital was Čazma. In 1559 Čazma was destroyed and seat of this sanjak was moved to Pakrac. The earliest document which refer to this sanjak as Sanjak of Pakrac is defter from 1565. The first sanjakbey of this sanjak was Ferhad-beg Desisalić-Vuković from Herzegovina. The Sanjak of Pakrac belonged first to Rumelia Eyalet and since 1580 to Bosnia Eyalet. Initially, its western frontier was river Česma. In 1591 the frontier moved and stabilized more eastward. Toward Croatian and Slavonian border the Ottomans populated numerous Christian Vlachs, who either already lived there or who were brought from Turkish (Serbian) territories, to live between their border garrisons Because of the substantial number of Vlachs, parts of the Sanjak of Pakrac and Sanjak of Požega were referred to as Mala Vlaška (English: Little Wallachia). Ottomans settled Pakrac and its surroundings with Vlachs from Bosnia in the middle of the 16th century while in Pakrac mainly lived Croatian and Bosnian Muslims. Many of Muslim settlers were ethnic Turks, but also they were and islamized south Slavs and Albanians.

According to one defter of second half of the 16th century, this sanjak had 13 nahiyahs. There were 15 defters of the Sanjak of Pakrac, all in the second half of the 16th century. In the defter of 1563 it is mentioned that captain of the region around river Sava was Husein, a son of Malkoč-beg. In 1586 forces under command of Ali-beg, sanjakbey of the Sanjak of Pakrac and brother of Ferhad Pasha Sokolović. were defeated near Ivanić Grad. In 1593 the Ottoman forces from the Sanjak of Pakrac under command of its sanjakbey Džafer-beg participated in the Battle of Sisak. Centre of Pakrac Sanjak was moved to Çernik in 1601. Sanjak of Pakrac existed till Austrian capture in 1691 (nominally to 1699). Finally Austrian conquest was finalized with Treaty of Karlowitz and existence of it was ended in 1699.

== Bibliography ==
- Klaić, Vjekoslav (1974). Povijest Hrvata od najstarijih vremena do svršetka XIX stoljeća. Nakladni zavod Matice hrvatske.
