= Mutnica =

- Village
- Location within Bosnia and Herzegovina
- Coordinates: 44.1773155°N 17.9800441°E
- Country: Bosnia and Herzegovina
- Entity: Federation of Bosnia and Herzegovina
- Canton: Zenica-Doboj
- Municipality: Zenica

Area
  - Total: 0.94 sq mi (2.44 km^{2})

Population (2013)
  - Total: 200
  - Density: 210/sq mi (82/km^{2})
- Time zone: UTC+1 (CET)
  - Summer (DST): UTC+2 (CEST)

Mutnica is a village in the City of Zenica, Bosnia and Herzegovina.

== Demographics ==
According to the 2013 census, its population was 200.

Ethnicity in 2013
Ethnicity	Number	Percentage
Bosniaks	170	85.0%
Croats	3	1.5%
Serbs	2	1.0%
other/undeclared	25	12.5%
Total	200	100%
