= Bosnia vilayet =

Administrative division of the Ottoman Empire from 1867 to 1878 (officially in 1908)

Bosnia Vilayet ولايت بوسنی (Ottoman Turkish) Vilâyet-i Bosna Bosanski vilajet / Босански вилајет / بۉسانسقٖى وٖىلايەت (Serbo-Croatian)
- Vilayet of the Ottoman Empire
- 1867–1878 de facto, 1908 de jure
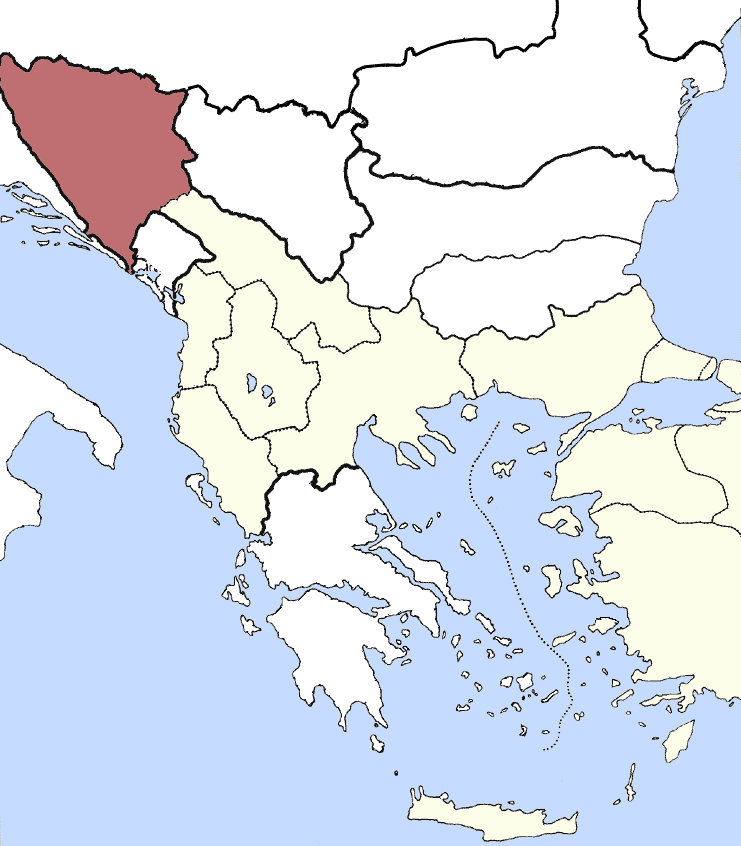
- The Bosnia Vilayet after the Congress of Berlin
- Capital: Sarajevo
- Area
  - Coordinates: 43°52′N 18°25′E
  - 1879: 46,000 km^{2} (18,000 sq mi)
- Population
  - 1879: 1,158,440
- History
  - Vilayet Law: 1867
  - Treaty of Berlin: 1878
  - Bosnian Crisis: 1908
Preceded by	Succeeded by
Bosnia Eyalet	Condominium of Bosnia and Herzegovina
- Today part of: Bosnia and Herzegovina; Montenegro
- Sources for population; area

The Bosnia Vilayet (Serbo-Croatian: Bosanski vilajet / Босански вилајет; Ottoman Turkish: ولايت بوسنی, Vilâyet-i Bosna) was a first-level administrative division (vilayet) of the Ottoman Empire, mostly comprising the territory of the present-day state of Bosnia and Herzegovina, with minor parts of modern Montenegro and Serbia.

It was formed in 1867 following the administrative reforms of the Tanzimat period, which transformed the former Bosnia Eyalet into a vilayet. It effectively ceased to exist as an Ottoman-administered province after the Austro-Hungarian campaign in Bosnia and Herzegovina in 1878, though it formally remained part of the Ottoman Empire for thirty more years until 1908. During this period, it was governed by Austria-Hungary as a condominium. In 1908, during the Bosnian Crisis, Austria-Hungary formally annexed the territory.

== Administrative divisions ==
Sanjaks of the Vilayet:

1. Sanjak of Bosnia (Kazas of Visoka, Foyniça, Çayniça, Vişegrad, Çelebipazar and Kladine)
2. Sanjak of Izvornik (Its center was Tuzla, included kazas of Maglay, Gradçaniça, Gradaçaç, Breçka, Belene, İzvornik and Birçe)
3. Sanjak of Banaluka (Kazas of Berbir, Derbend and Teşene)
4. Sanjak of Hersek (Its center was Mostar, included kazas of Foça, Koniça, Dumna, Liyubuşka, İstolça, Trebin, Bileke, Nikşik and Gaçka)
5. Sanjak of Travnik (Kazas of Yayçe, Akhisar, Belgradçık and İhlivne)
6. Sanjak of Bihke (Kazas of Köluyc, Novosel, Sazın, Krupa, Kostayniça and Pridor)

== Languages ==
Bosnian language was used as the second official language of this vilayet.

== See also ==
- List of Ottoman governors of Bosnia
- Ottoman Bosnia and Herzegovina
- Pashaluk of Herzegovina
- Sanjak of Novi Pazar
