= Ottoman Bosnia and Herzegovina =

Period of Bosnian and Herzegovinian history from the 15th–19th centuries

Ottoman Bosnia and Herzegovina Bosna i Hercegovina u Osmanlijskom Carstvu (Serbo-Croatian)
- 1463–1908
- Flag

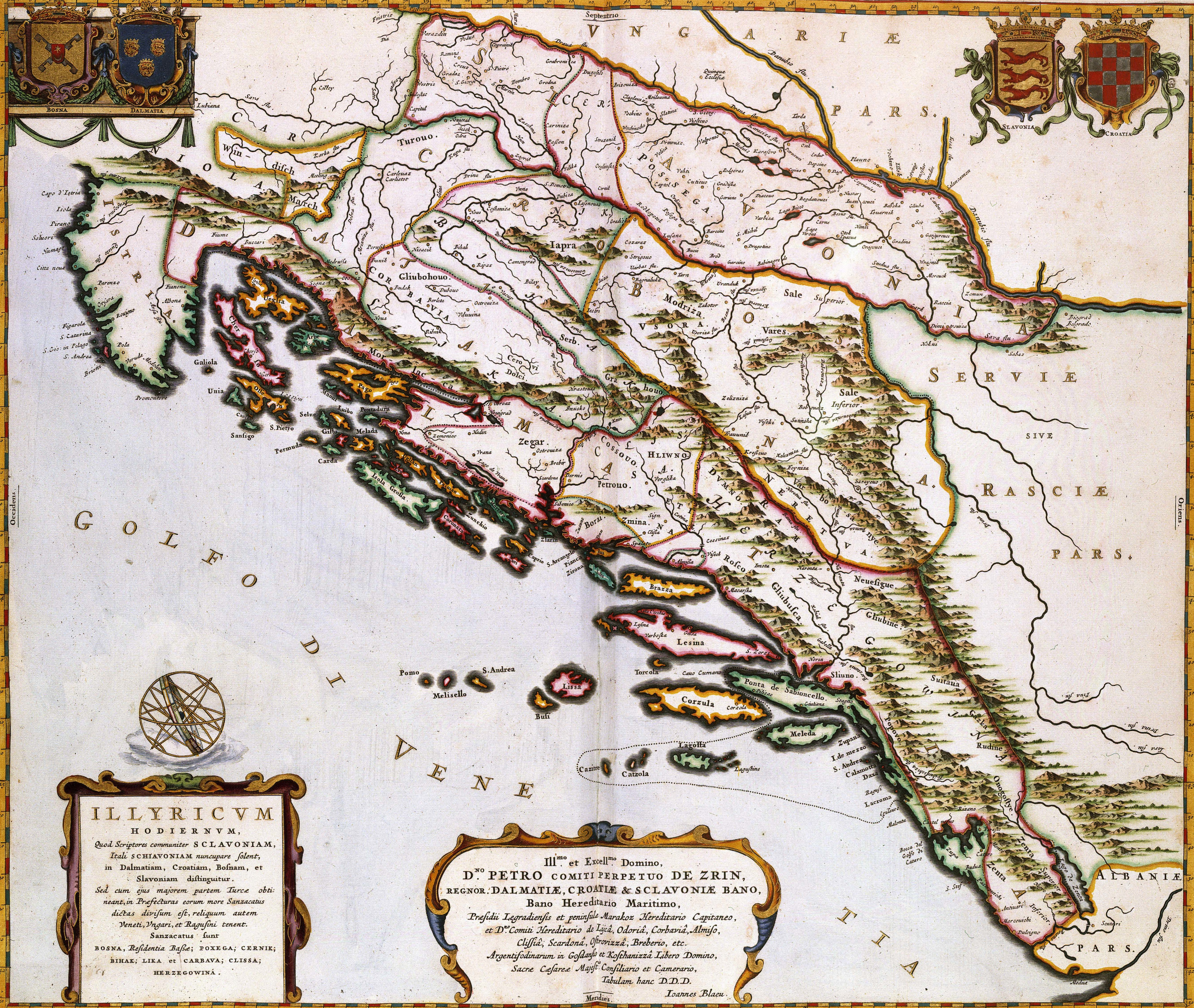
- Common languages: Serbo-Croatian
- Religion: Sunni Islam (official); Christianity
- Demonym: Bosnian/Herzegovinian

Government
- Beylerbey, Pasha, Agha, Militia
- History
  - Ottoman conquest of Bosnia and Herzegovina: 1463
  - Herzegovina uprising: 1875–1877
  - Austro-Hungarian occupation: 1878
  - Bosnian Crisis: 1908
Preceded by	Succeeded by
Kingdom of Bosnia	Austro-Hungarian rule in Bosnia and Herzegovina
- Today part of: Bosnia and Herzegovina; Serbia; Montenegro; Croatia

The Ottoman Empire era of rule in Bosnia (first as a sanjak, then as an eyalet) and Herzegovina (also as a sanjak, then eyalet) lasted from 1463/1482 to 1908.

== Ottoman conquest ==
The Ottoman conquest of Bosnia and Herzegovina started in 1384, and subsequently the Ottoman invasion expanded into the so-called Bosansko Krajište. The Kingdom of Bosnia finally fell in 1463. Herzegovina fell to the Turks in 1482. It took another century for the western parts of today's Bosnia to succumb to Ottoman attacks. Bosnia continued legally under the royal House of Berislavić, and fell finally in 1527 with the fall of its capital Jajce. The first occupation administration was established that same year.

A significant number of Bosnians converted to Islam after the conquest by the Ottoman Empire in the second half of the 15th century, giving it a unique character within the Balkan region. This conversion appears to have been not sudden but a gradual process based on various rules imposed by the Ottomans — it took more than a hundred years for the number of Muslims to become the majority religion. The general view among scholars is that the Islamization of the Bosnian population was not the result of violent methods of conversions but was, for the most part, peaceful and voluntary.

== Ottoman Rule ==
The Turks had conquered Slavonia and most of Hungary by 1541. In the next century, most of the Bosnian province wasn't a borderland and developed in relative peace. It was administered by the Ottoman Bosnia Eyalet and Herzegovina Eyalet.

However, when the Empire lost the war of 1683–1697 with Austria, and ceded Slavonia and Hungary to Austria at the Treaty of Karlowitz, Bosnia's northern and western borders became the frontier between the Austrian and Ottoman empires.

In 1716, Austria occupied northern Bosnia and northern Serbia, but this lasted only until 1739 when they were ceded to the Ottoman Empire at the Treaty of Belgrade. The borders set then remained in place for another century and a half, though the border wars continued.

The wars between the Ottomans and Austria and Venice impoverished Bosnia, and encouraged further migration and resettlement; Muslim refugees from Hungary and Slavonia resettled in Bosnia, assimilating into the native Bosniak population, whilst many Eastern Orthodox Christians, mostly from Kosovo but also including those from Serbia and Bosnia, resettled across the Bosnian border in Slavonia and the Military Frontier at the invitation of the Austrian Emperor.

According to an Ottoman Muslim account of the Austro-Russian–Turkish War (1735–39) translated into English by C. Fraser, Bosnian Muslim women fought in battle since they "acquired the courage of heroes" against the Austrian Germans at the siege of Osterwitch-atyk (Östroviç-i âtık) fortress. Bosnian Muslim women and men were among the casualties during the Battle of Osterwitchatyk. Bosnian Muslim women fought in the defense of the fortress of Būzin (Büzin). Women and men resisted the Austrians at the Chetin (Çetin) Fortress. The women of the Bosnians were deemed to be militaristic according to non-Ottoman records of the war between the Ottomans and Austrians and they played a role in the Bosnian success in battle against the Austrian attackers. Yeni Pazar, Izvornik, Östroviç-i âtık, Çetin, Būzin, Gradişka, and Banaluka were struck by the Austrians. A French account described the bravery in battle of Bosnian Muslim women who fought in the war.

The Ottoman Sultans attempted to implement various economic and military reforms in the early 19th century in order to address the grave issues mostly caused by the border wars. The reforms, however, were usually met with resistance by the military captaincies of Bosnia.

Flag of Bosnia Vilayet gathered thousands of Bosniaks to seek independence in 1878.

The most famous of these insurrections was the 1831–1832 one, headed by Captain Husein Gradaščević (Zmaj od Bosne, the Bosnian Dragon), who raised a full-scale rebellion in the province, joined by thousands of native Bosnian soldiers. Despite winning several notable victories, the rebels were eventually defeated in a battle near Sarajevo in 1832. Internal discord contributed to the failure of the rebellion, because Gradaščević was not supported by much of the Herzegovinian nobility. The rebellion was extinguished by 1850, but the Empire continued to decline.

Ottoman rule lasted for over four hundred years, until 1878. Although nominally Bosnia-Herzegovina remained Ottoman territory (without actual effective rule) until 1908, when it officially became part of Austria-Hungary.

== Governing structure ==
The Ottoman rule also saw many architectural investments in Bosnia and the creation and development of many new cities including Sarajevo and Mostar. This is mostly because of the high esteem the Bosniaks held in the eyes of the Sultans and the Turks. The Empire also promoted close relations between Turks and Bosniaks, and many Turks during Ottoman times felt a trust for and a kinship with the Bosniaks.

=== Administrative ===
The area of the current Bosnia and Herzegovina was initially part of the Ottoman Rumelia Province (beylerbeylik) and was divided between the three sanjaks (second-level administrative units) of Bosnia (Bosna), Herzegovina (Hersek), and Zvornik (İzvornik). In 1580, the Ottomans created the Bosnia Eyalet which was subdivided into the sanjaks of Bosnia and Herzegovina, among others. They also introduced the so-called spahi system (actually the timar holder system) which changed the local administration and the agriculture, but was generally an arrangement similar to European feudal fiefs. Bosnia and Herzegovina was also the only Ottoman province that had a captaincy system in place.

Later as part of the Ottoman Tanzimat reforms, the region became the Bosnia Vilayet which encompassed entire present-day Bosnia and Herzegovina along with the Sandžak region (then the Sanjak of Novi Pazar), parts of Serbia and Montenegro.

=== Religion ===
All of the Bosnian Church adherents eventually converted to Islam. There are conflicting claims on the exact ratios or whether or how much of it was voluntary or not. Since earliest Turkish defters clearly distinguish Bosnian Christians from Catholics or Orthodox, it is now general consensus that the number of Christians adherents in the times during Ottoman rule did not exceed a few hundred people, due to mainly Islamic converts.

Ottoman rule also changed the ethnic and religious makeup of Bosnia and Herzegovina. Many Catholic Bosnians retreated to Croatia, which was controlled by Habsburg Austria after the Ottoman conquest of most of the Kingdom of Hungary, and to Dalmatia, which was controlled by the Republic of Venice after the fall of Hungary. Conversely, during the couple of centuries Croatia was under Austro-Hungarian rule and Bosnia under Ottoman rule, Muslims from the north and west migrated into Bosnia, forming a heavily-Muslim pocket in its northwest corner around Bihać. The Ottoman period also saw the development of a Sephardic Jewish community in Bosnia, chiefly in Sarajevo. The Sephardic Jews were persecuted in and expelled from Catholic Spain at the end of the 15th century, and many resettled in the Ottoman Empire because of its tolerance towards other religions (especially towards People of the Book), mainly in and around Istanbul. The first synagogue was built in Sarajevo in 1581.

=== Taxation ===
During the Ottoman period, Christians were treated as "dhimmis" by the Ottoman authorities but were otherwise subject to the same restrictions as Muslim subjects. Dhimmis were not required to join the army, but they paid a special tax called jizya (glavarina in Bosnia).

During Ottoman rule, many children of Christian parents, regardless of whether Orthodox or Catholic, were separated from their families and raised to be members of the Janissary Corps (this practice was known as the devşirme system, 'devşirmek' meaning 'to gather' or 'to recruit'). However, this practice was heavily resented by most of the people of the area. This was because of the very high position a Janissary held in Ottoman society. Owing to their education (for they were taught arts, science, maths, poetry, literature and many of the languages spoken in the Ottoman Empire, such as Arabic, Bosnian, Croatian, Serbian, Greek and Turkish), Janissaries could easily work their way up to becoming governors or even Grand Viziers.

== Sources ==
- Būsnavī, 'Umar (1830). History of the War in Bosnia During the Years 1737 - 1739. Oriental Translation-Fund.
