= Boljanići =

Boljanići Бољанићи Bolehnići
- Village
- Location within Montenegro
- Country: Montenegro
- Region: Northern
- Municipality: Pljevlja

Population (2011)
  - Total: 62
- Time zone: UTC+1 (CET)
  - Summer (DST): UTC+2 (CEST)

Boljanići (Montenegrin: Бољанићи) is a small village in the municipality of Pljevlja, Montenegro. It was historically known as Bolehnići (Болехнићи).

== Demographics ==
According to the 2003 census, the village had a population of 60 people, 48,33% declaring as Serbs and 46,66% as Montenegrins.

According to the 2011 census, its population was 62.

Ethnicity in 2011
Ethnicity	Number	Percentage
Serbs	46	74.2%
Montenegrins	10	16.1%
other/undeclared	6	9.7%
Total	62	100%
