= Bosnia Eyalet =

Administrative division of the Ottoman Empire from 1580 to 1867

Bosnia Eyalet ایالت بوسنه (Ottoman Turkish) Eyālet-i Bōsnâ Bosna Eyaleti (Turkish) Bosanski pašaluk (Serbo-Croatian)
- Eyalet of the Ottoman Empire
- 1580–1867
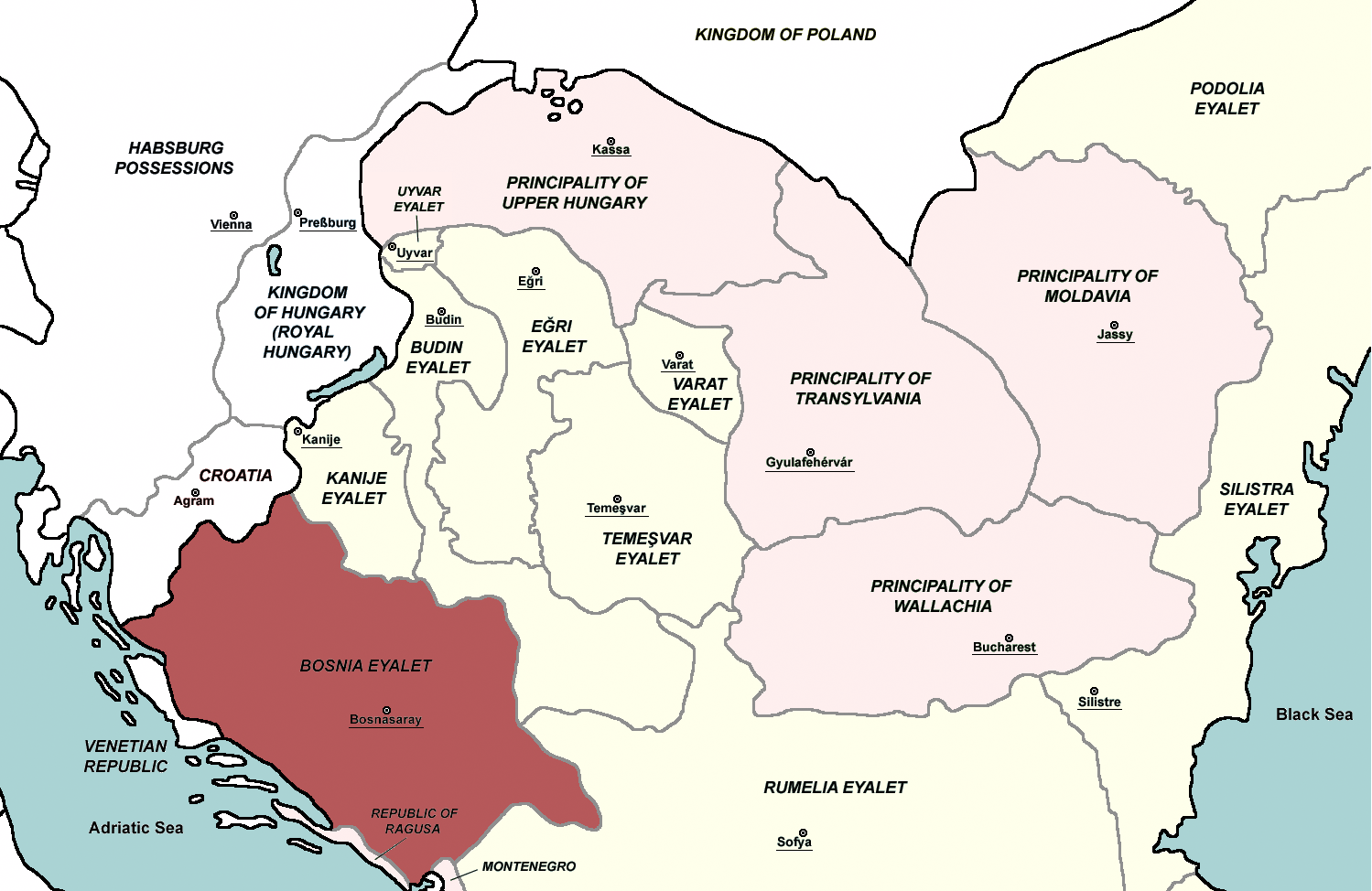
- The Bosnia Eyalet in 1683
- Capital: Bosna-Saray (1520–1533); Banja Luka (1553–1639); Bosna-Saray (1639–1699); Travnik (1699–1832)
- Population
  - 1732: 340,000
  - 1787: 600,000
- History
  - Established: 1580
  - Disestablished: 1867
Preceded by	Succeeded by
Sanjak of Bosnia	Bosnia Vilayet
- Today part of: Bosnia and Herzegovina; Croatia; Serbia; Montenegro

The Eyalet of Bosnia (Ottoman Turkish: ایالت بوسنه, romanized: Eyālet-i Bōsnâ; Turkish: Bosna Eyaleti; Serbo-Croatian: Bosanski pašaluk), was an eyalet (administrative division, also known as a beylerbeylik) of the Ottoman Empire, mostly based on the territory of the present-day state of Bosnia and Herzegovina. Prior to the Great Turkish War, it had also included most of Slavonia, Lika, and Dalmatia in present-day Croatia. Its reported area in 1853 was 52,530 square kilometres (20,281 sq mi).

== Background ==
After the execution of King Stephen Tomašević in 1463, the central part of the Kingdom of Bosnia was transformed into the sanjak of Bosnia. The Duchy of Herzegovina was added in 1483.

== History ==
=== Establishment ===
In 1580, Ferhad Pasha Sokolović became the first governor of the Bosnia Eyalet, as beylerbey (also referred to as "pasha"). The Bosnia Eyalet (or Pashaluk) included the Sanjak of Bosnia (central province), Sanjak of Herzegovina, Sanjak of Viçitrina, Sanjak of Prizren, Sanjak of Klis, Sanjak of Krka, and Sanjak of Pakrac.

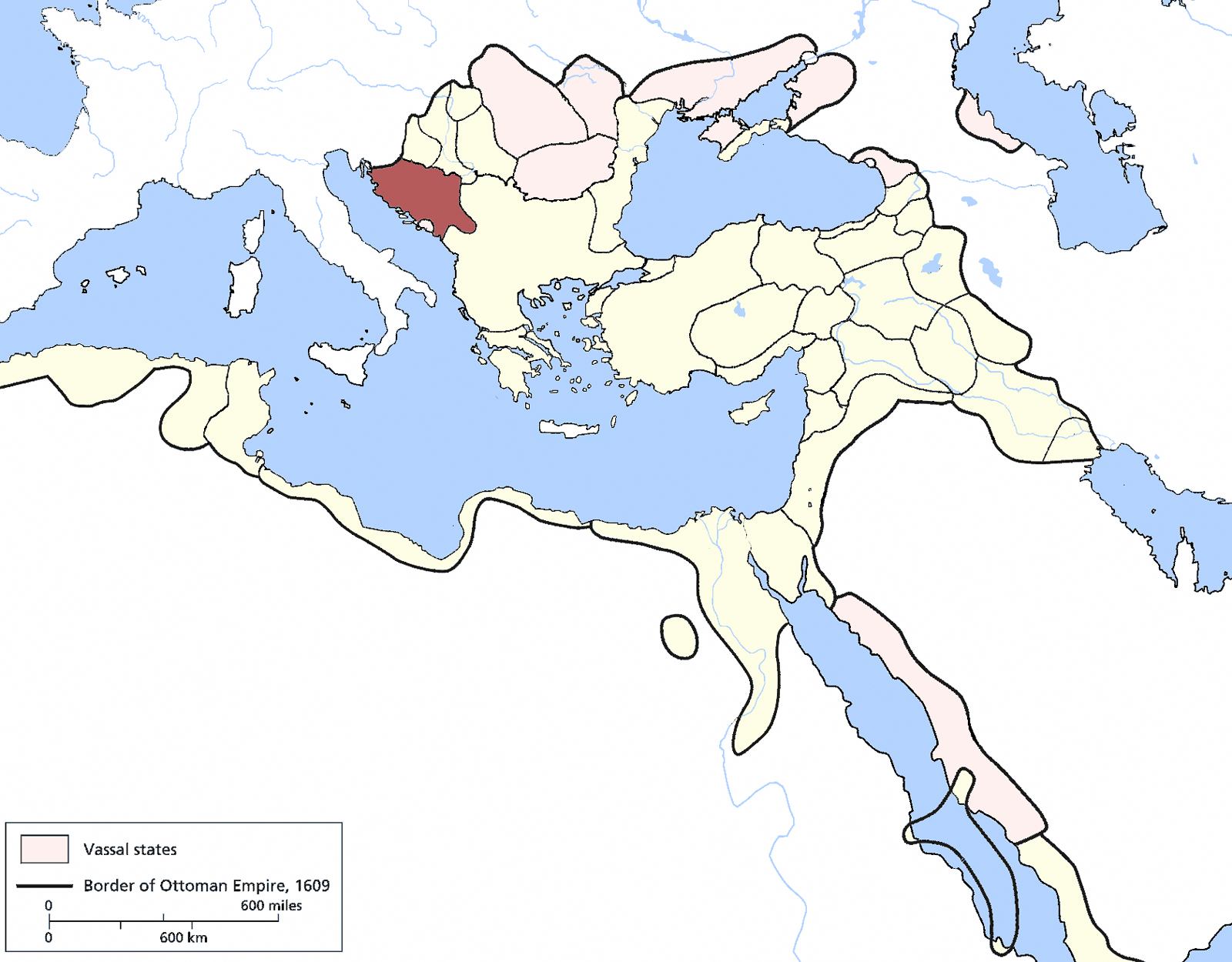
Bosnia Eyalet in 1609

The Ottoman wars in Europe continued throughout the period, and the province reached its territorial peak in 1683.

=== Decline ===
The Great Turkish War that ended in Ottoman defeat in 1699 led to a significant decrease in the territory of the Eyalet, losing all the Slavonian sanjaks ("Požeški sandžak" and "Pakrački sandžak"), the sanjak of Lika and big parts of the Dalmatian coast from the sanjaks of Klisa and Herzegovina. The Eyalet lost three sanjaks and suppressed one (the sanjak of Bihać): after the Treaty of Karlowitz, the province was down to four sanjaks (three of them diminished in size as well) and twelve captaincies. Before the Treaty of Passarowitz, another 28 military captaincies were formed, more than half of them along the frontier. This kind of intensive military administration corresponded to the Austrian Military Frontier on the other side of the same border. In 1703 the seat of the pasha was moved from Sarajevo to Travnik, because Sarajevo had been destroyed by fire in the war; it wouldn't be moved back until 1850.

=== Bosnian uprising ===
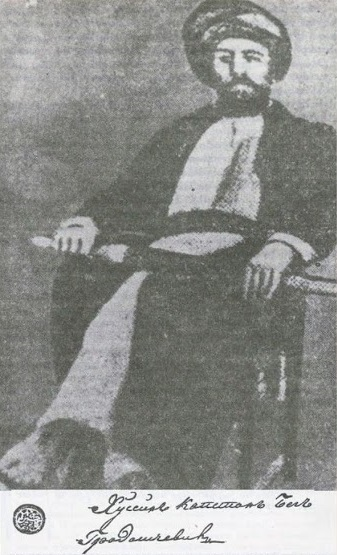
Husein Gradaščević was declared the governor of the Eyalet of Bosnia in 1831 and revolted against the Ottomans in a bid to secure Bosnian independence.

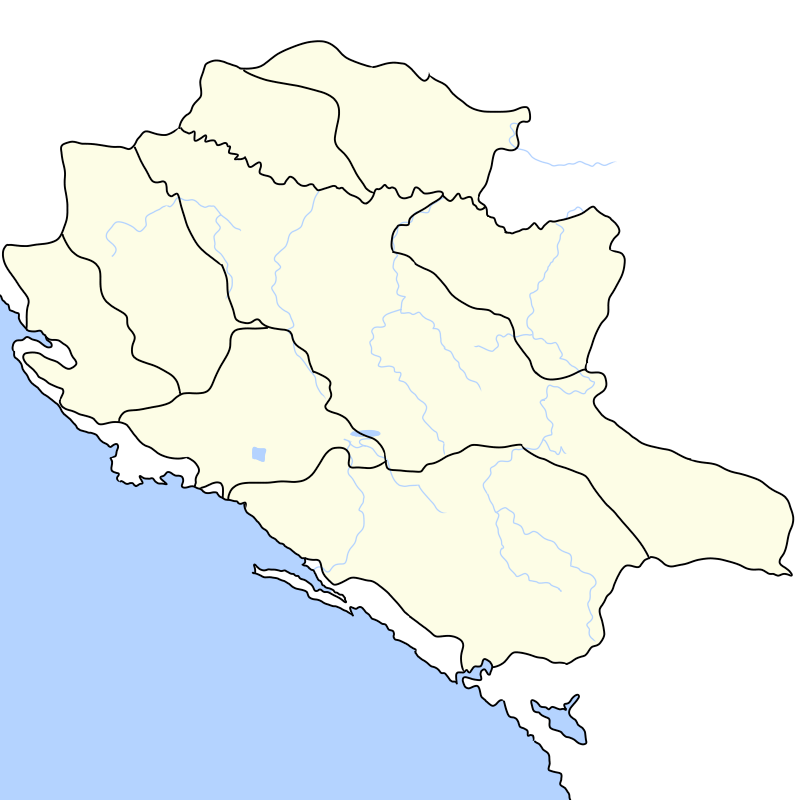
Map of the Bosnia Eyalet in 1609. with its Sanjak's.

At the beginning of the 19th century, Bosnia was one of the least developed and more autonomous provinces of the Empire. In 1831, Bosnian kapudan Husein Gradaščević, after meeting in Tuzla with Bosnian aristocrats from 20 January to 5 February for preparations, finally occupied Travnik, demanding autonomy and the end of military reforms in Bosnia. Ultimately, exploiting the rivalries between beys and kapudans, the grand vizier succeeded in detaching the Herzegovinian forces, led by Ali-paša Rizvanbegović, from Gradaščević's. The revolt was crushed, and in 1833, a new eyalet of Herzegovina was created from the southern part of the eyalet of Bosnia and given to Ali-paša Rizvanbegović as a reward for his contribution in crushing the uprising. This new entity lasted only for a few years: after Rizvanbegović's death, it was reintegrated into the Bosnia eyalet.

It was one of the first Ottoman provinces to become a vilayet after an administrative reform in 1865, and by 1867 it had been reformed into the Bosnia Vilayet.

== Administration ==
=== Administrative divisions ===
Sanjaks of the Bosnia Eyalet during the 17th century, according to Evliya Çelebi:

1. Sanjak of Sarajevo (Seráï, Saraybosna)
2. Sanjak of Herzegovina (Hersek, Hersek)
3. Sanjak of Klis (Kilís, Klis)
4. Sanjak of Zvornik (Zvorník, İzvornik)
5. Sanjak of Pojega (Pozegha, Pojega)
6. Sanjak of Cernica (Záchina, Zaceşne)
7. Sanjak of Krka (Kírka, Kırka)
8. Sanjak of Orahovica (Ráhovícha, Rahoviçe)
9. Sanjak of Banja Luka (Banalúka, Banaluka)

Administrative division of the eyalet of Bosnia before 1699 were as follows:
1. Sanjak of Bosnia (Paşa Sancağı, Sarajevo (Sarabosna))
2. Sanjak of Herzegovina (Hersek Sancağı, Mostar)
3. Sanjak of Zvornik (İzvornik Sancağı, Zvornik)
4. Sanjak of Krka-Lika (Kırka Sancağı, Krka-Lika)
5. Sanjak of Klis (Kilis Sancağı, Klis (Kilis), after mid-16th century Livno (İhlevne))
6. Sanjak of Cernica (Zaçesne Ocaklılığı, Cernik)
7. Sanjak of Bihke (Bihke Sancağı, Bihać)
At the beginning of the 19th century, Bosnia was composed of 7 sanjaks:
1. Sanjak of Sarajevo
2. Sanjak of Zvornik
3. Sanjak of Travnik
4. Sanjak of Bihać
5. Sanjak of Novi Pazar
6. Sanjak of Banja Luka
7. Sanjak of Herzegovina

=== Capitals ===
Bosnia Eyalet's capital city moved several times:

- Travnik (1553; 1697–1833; 1839/40–1851)
- Banja Luka (Banyaluka or Banaluka) (1553–1638)
- Sarajevo (Saray Bosna) (1639–1697; 1833–1839/40; 1851–1878)

=== Governors ===
- Sarı Süleyman Pasha
- Osman Gradaščević
- Abaza Mehmed Pasha
- Hasan Predojević
- Husein Gradaščević
- Husein Boljanić
- Ali-paša Rizvanbegović
- Mehmed-beg Kulenović
- Bekir Pasha (1800–01)

== See also ==
- List of Ottoman governors of Bosnia
- Ottoman Bosnia and Herzegovina
- Pashaluk of Herzegovina
- Sanjak of Novi Pazar

== Sources ==
- Ibrahimagić, Omer (1998). Constitutional development of Bosnia and Herzegovina (PDF). Sarajevo: Vijeće kongresa bošnjačkih intelektualaca. ISBN 9958-47-030-6. Archived from the original (PDF) on 2018-04-17.
