= Sanjak of Bosnia =

Ottoman sanjak from 1463 to 1878

Sanjak of Bosnia Bosna Sancak (Turkish) Bosanski sandžak/Босански санџак (Serbo-Croatian)
- Sanjak of the Ottoman Empire
- 1463–1878
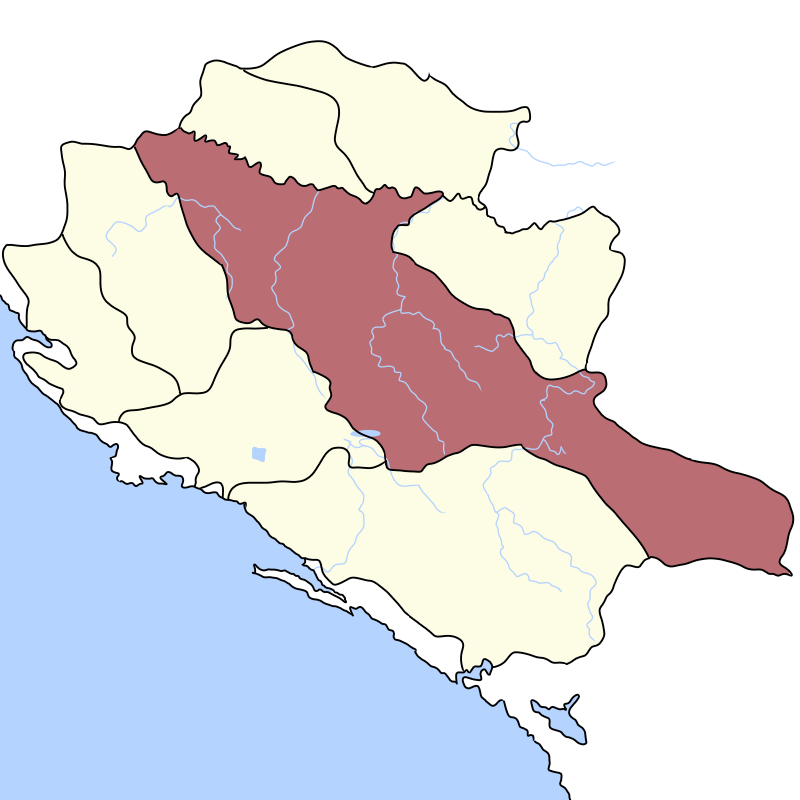
- Map of the Sanjak of Bosnia at its height.
- Capital: Sarajevo (1463–c. 1554); Banja Luka (c. 1554–1580)
- Demonym: Bosnian
- Government
- Sanjak-bey
  - 1463–1470 (first): Isa Bey Ishaković
  - 1574–1580 (last): Ferhad Bey Sokolović
- History
  - Conquered from the Kingdom of Bosnia: 1463
  - Became central province of the Eyalet of Bosnia: 1580
  - Austro-Hungarian occupation: 1878
Preceded by	Succeeded by
Bosansko Krajište; Kingdom of Bosnia	Bosnia Eyalet
- Today part of: Bosnia and Herzegovina; Croatia; Serbia; Montenegro; Kosovo

The Sanjak of Bosnia (Turkish: Bosna Sancak; Serbo-Croatian: Bosanski sandžak / Босански санџак) was one of the sanjaks of the Ottoman Empire. It was established in 1463, after the lands conquered from the Kingdom of Bosnia were transformed into a sanjak. Its first sanjakbey was Isa Bey Ishaković.

Between 1463 and 1580, it was part of the Rumelia Eyalet. Due to its strategic position on the border, it functioned as a krajište (frontier province), serving as a military base for Ottoman raids into Hungary and Croatia.

After the Bosnia Eyalet was established in 1580, the Sanjak of Bosnia became its central and main province. Between 1864 and the Austro-Hungarian occupation in 1878, it was part of the Bosnia Vilayet. Although the Bosnia Vilayet formally remained part of the Ottoman Empire until 1908, the Sanjak of Bosnia de facto ceased to exist in 1878.

== History ==
=== Establishment and role of Isa Bey Ishaković (1463–1480) ===
The sanjak was formed immediately after the Ottoman conquest of the medieval Kingdom of Bosnia in 1463. Its first sanjakbey was the prominent Ottoman general and administrator Isa Bey Ishaković. Isa Bey was tasked with establishing Ottoman rule and creating a new urban centre. He accomplished this through his waqf (endowment), recorded in his waqf-nama (deed of endowment) from 1462. With his waqf, he built key objects: a mosque (the Emperor's Mosque), a hammam (public bath), a bridge, a caravanserai, and numerous shops that formed the new bazaar. Through this act, the existing village of Vrhbosna was transformed into the kasaba (town) of Sarajevo, which became the first seat of the sanjak.

=== Expansion as a Krajište (Frontier) (1480–1580) ===
For the first 120 years of its existence, the Sanjak of Bosnia was a krajište—a militarised frontier province facing Hungary and the Republic of Venice. The sanjakbeys held broad military powers and led akinji (light cavalry) raids into neighbouring territories. The rule of Gazi Husrev Bey (who governed the sanjak in multiple terms between 1521 and 1541) represents the "golden age" of the sanjak. He led successful military campaigns, conquered Jajce (in 1527) and Knin, and simultaneously used his massive waqfs to build the Gazi Husrev Bey Mosque, Madrasa, and Bezistan (covered market), transforming Sarajevo into a major Ottoman city.

As the Ottoman frontier shifted further north and west, Sarajevo began to lose its central strategic position. Sometime before 1554, the seat of the sanjak was moved to Banja Luka, which was more suitable as a base for military operations against Croatia.

=== Period of stability and stagnation (1580–1878) ===
With the establishment of the Bosnia Eyalet in 1580, under the rule of Ferhad Pasha Sokolović from Banja Luka, the Sanjak of Bosnia lost its frontier status and became a central internal unit of the new eyalet. Its role as a "krajište" ended. After the Great Turkish War and the Treaty of Karlowitz in 1699, the Eyalet's borders shrank dramatically. The raid by Eugene of Savoy in 1697, which left Sarajevo burned, marked the beginning of a long period of stagnation and border conflicts that would last until the Austro-Hungarian occupation in 1878.

== Administration ==
=== Role of the Sanjakbey ===
The sanjak was headed by a sanjakbey, who was subordinate to the Beylerbey of the Rumelia Eyalet (until 1580). The sanjakbey was the chief military commander (commanding the sanjak's spahis) and the highest administrative authority. For his services, the sanjakbey received a large personal land grant (hass).

=== Internal division ===
The Ottoman administrative system was hierarchical. Sanjaks were further divided into kadiluks (judicial districts, headed by a kadi) and nahiye (smaller territorial units). The kadi, in addition to judicial functions, also held administrative power within his district.

=== Timar system ===
The foundation of Ottoman rule and its economy in the Sanjak of Bosnia was the timar-spahi system. This was a form of military feudalism where the Sultan granted land revenues (timars) to spahis (cavalrymen) in exchange for their military service. The spahis were obligated, depending on the size of the timar, to go to war and bring a number of armed horsemen (djebelu) with them.

=== Devshirme (Blood Tax) ===
Besides the timar system, a key mechanism for military and administrative recruitment was the Devshirme (known as the "blood tax") system. Through this system, Ottoman authorities periodically levied Christian boys from the provinces, converted them to Islam, and trained them in Istanbul. The most capable became elite soldiers (Janissaries) or high-ranking state officials at the Sultan's court.

This system represented one of the few paths of upward social mobility for the sanjak's inhabitants. Many of the most powerful Ottoman officials of Bosnian origin, including the Grand Vizier Sokollu Mehmed Pasha, were a product of the devshirme system.

=== Sanjakbeys ===
Over its 415 years of existence, the Sanjak of Bosnia was governed by numerous sanjakbeys. In the period up to 1580 (when the Bosnia Eyalet was established), prominent figures included Isa Bey Ishaković, Gazi Husrev Bey, and Ferhad Pasha Sokolović.

== Economy ==
The economy was based on the agrarian timar system and developed urban craftsmanship.

=== Urban economy: Çarşı and Esnafs ===
The centre of economic life in cities like Sarajevo and Banja Luka was the čaršija (bazaar district). The čaršija was divided into dozens of smaller streets (sokaks), each dedicated to a specific craft (e.g., blacksmiths, coppersmiths, bootmakers).

Craftsmen were organised into strict guild organisations known as esnafs (guilds). The esnafs had precise statutes (nizam) that regulated all aspects of the craft: the relationships between masters (usta), journeymen (kalfa), and apprentices (šegrt); quality standards; prices; and the election of the guild leadership (ćehaja).

== Demographics ==
=== Process of Islamization and the fate of the Bosnian Church ===
Following the Ottoman conquest in 1463, a long-term and complex process of Islamization of the local population began. A key factor in this process was the disappearance of the medieval Bosnian Church. This church organisation, already weakened by long-term persecution from the Catholic Church, effectively ceased to exist with the Ottoman conquest.

According to the dominant historical theory (e.g., John Fine), the adherents of the Bosnian Church (krstjani), left without their own religious structure and facing a choice between Catholicism, Orthodoxy, and Islam, were significantly more receptive to conversion to Islam than the members of the other two, firmly organised churches. This, combined with economic and social motives (such as the abolition of the jizya tax and gaining rights within the timar system), explains the high rate of Islamization in Bosnia.

=== Millet system and the Fojnica Ahdnama ===
The Ottoman Empire organized its non-Muslim population (Ahl al-Kitab or "People of the Book") through the Millet system. This system granted non-Muslim communities (Catholics, Orthodox, and Jews) a certain degree of legal and judicial autonomy to handle their own internal affairs, through their religious leaders.

The status of the Catholic millet in Bosnia was uniquely defined by the Fojnica Ahdnama. According to tradition, this charter (Ahdnama) was issued by Sultan Mehmed II the Conqueror in 1463 at Milodraž to Friar Anđeo Zvizdović. The Ahdnama guaranteed the Franciscan Order, as the only remaining Catholic institution in Bosnia, personal safety and freedom of religious practice. It thus became the foundational legal act for the survival of the Catholic community in the Sanjak of Bosnia.

=== Migrations ===
The Ottoman period was marked by significant migrations. Following the expulsion of Jews from Spain in 1492, Sephardic Jews began to arrive in Ottoman cities, including Sarajevo, where they formed a significant community during the 16th century. Simultaneously, Ottoman authorities encouraged the settlement of semi-nomadic Vlach populations into depopulated frontier areas (krajišta) in exchange for military service.

=== Demographic snapshot (1624) ===
According to a 1624 report by the apostolic visitor Peter Masarechi, the population of the broader area of Bosnia (likely the Bosnia Eyalet, not just the Sanjak of Bosnia) consisted of 450,000 Muslims, 150,000 Catholics, and 75,000 Orthodox.

== Language and culture ==
Although Ottoman Turkish was the official language of administration, in practice, particularly during the sanjak's early phase, the local vernacular, written in Bosančica (Bosnian Cyrillic), persisted. This is evidenced by the Slavonic text found beneath the tughra of Sultan Selim I on a 1519 document addressed to the inhabitants of Bosnia.

Cultural and architectural development in the cities was almost exclusively tied to the waqf system. Wealthy governors like Isa Bey Ishaković and Gazi Husrev Bey invested their personal fortunes to build the mosques, madrasas, libraries, hammams, bridges, and caravanserais that formed the nucleus of Ottoman urban civilisation.

== See also ==
- Ottoman Bosnia and Herzegovina
- Bosnia Eyalet
- Pashaluk of Herzegovina
- Sanjak of Novi Pazar
