= Literature of Bosnia and Herzegovina =

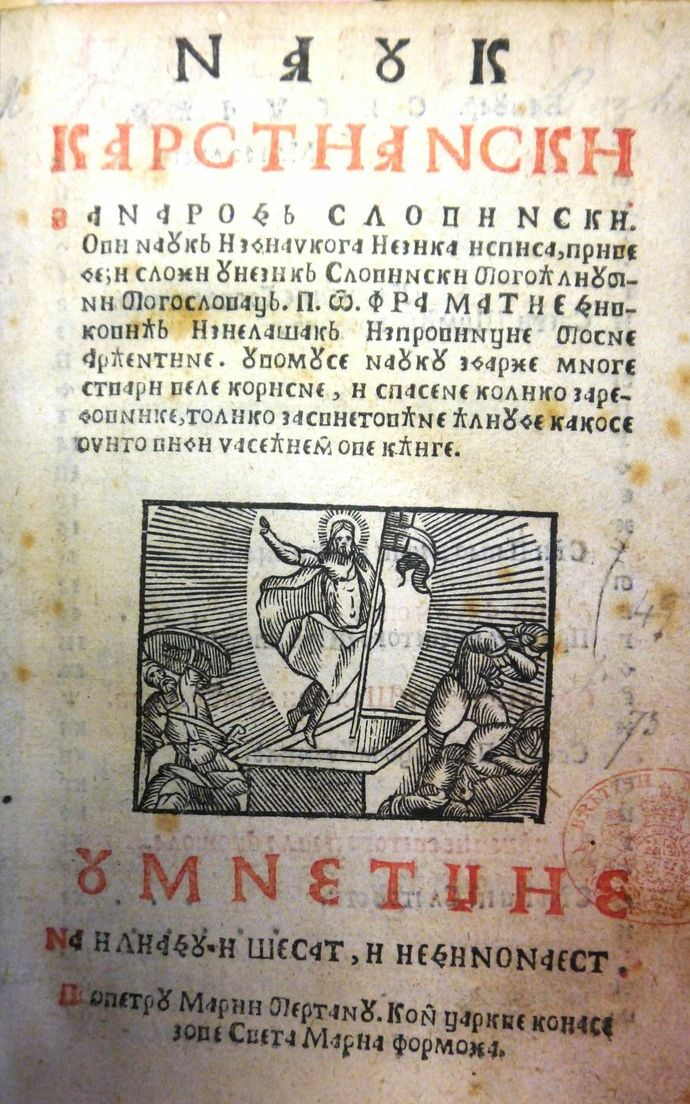
The title leaf of the first Bosnian book printed in 1611, Nauk krstjanski za narod slovinski, also known as Mali nauk (Christian Doctrine for Slavonic People, aka. Little Doctrine) by the "father of Bosnian literature", Matija Divković.

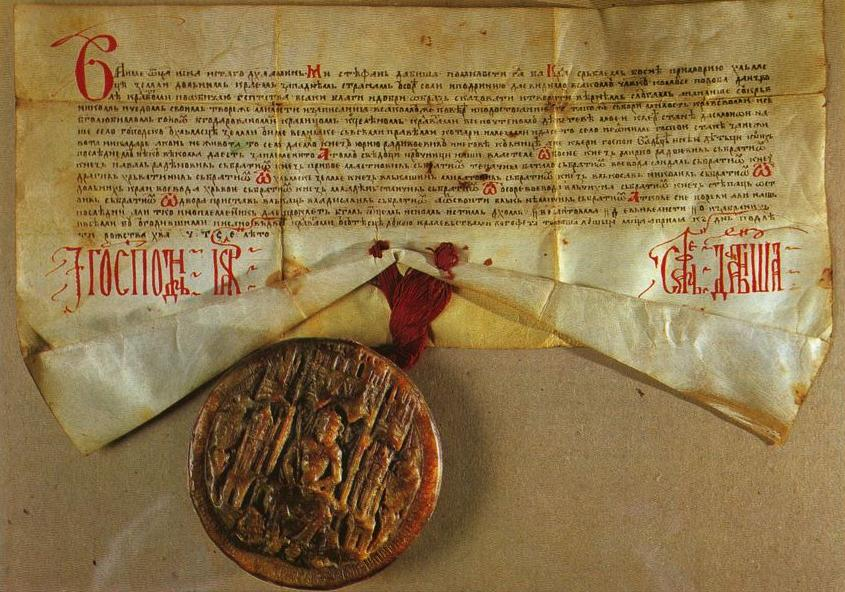
Charter of the King Dabiša, at the turn of the 14th to the 15th century.

The literature of Bosnia and Herzegovina (Bosnian: Bosanskohercegovačka književnost) is a complex literary production within Bosnia and Herzegovina, which is seen as a unique, singular literature of Bosnia and Herzegovina (Bosnian and Herzegovinian literature, or Bosnian literature), consisting of literary traditions of the people of Bosnia and Herzegovina.

In various times and periods in history, it is written in Serbo-Croatian, Bosnian, Croatian, and Serbian languages, using both Latin and Cyrillic scripts. Historically, it also used Ladino, Arabic, Persian and Ottoman-Turkish, with a use of peculiar form known as Aljamiado and Arebica. Hence, the literature of Bosnia and Herzegovina was realized within the framework of multicultural-civilizational paradigm. It is closely related to other South Slavic literature.

The most important representatives of modern literature are writers such as Ivo Andrić, Meša Selimović, Enver Čolaković, Branko Ćopić, Derviš Sušić, poets such as Mak Dizdar, Aleksa Šantić, Antun Branko Šimić, Izet Sarajlić, essayists such as Hamdija Kreševljaković, and present-day contemporaries such as poet Marko Vešović, playwright Abdulah Sidran, novelists Aleksandar Hemon, Miljenko Jergović, Saša Stanišić, and Andrej Nikolaidis, essayist Ivan Lovrenović, Željko Ivanković, Dubravko Lovrenović, Predrag Matvejević, and many others.

Going back to the medieval times, literature was predominantly ecclesiastical, with literacy revolving around a production of the Bosnian Church, and other religious liturgical, diplomatic and trade texts, based in Bosnian vernacular, an old form of Shtokavian dialect, Ijekavian dialect, in some cases Old Slavic, and using Bosančica (transl. Bosnian Cyrillic) and Glagolitic scripts. One specific peculiarity of this period in Bosnia and Herzegovina are written monuments in form of stećaks. The international trade agreement between Republic of Ragusa and the Bosnian medieval state of Ban Kulin, the Ban Kulin's charter, written in Bosnian vernacular using Bosančica, is the first such document among South Slavs, which appeared half a century earlier than first charter of any kind in Germany (the first one was from 1238/9), and just a little later than first such document in Christian Spain and southern France.

From late medieval and early modern times onward, the role of the Bosnian Franciscans became crucial for the literary developments, and their production in the same Bosnian vernacular Narodni jezik (transl. peoples language), written in Bosančica, became an integral part of the Bosnia and Herzegovina literature, with Matija Divković, the first Bosnian typographer who in 1611 printed the first Bosnian book, written in Bosnian using Bosančica, being dubbed the founding father of Bosnia and Herzegovina literature.

== Background and theoretical basis ==
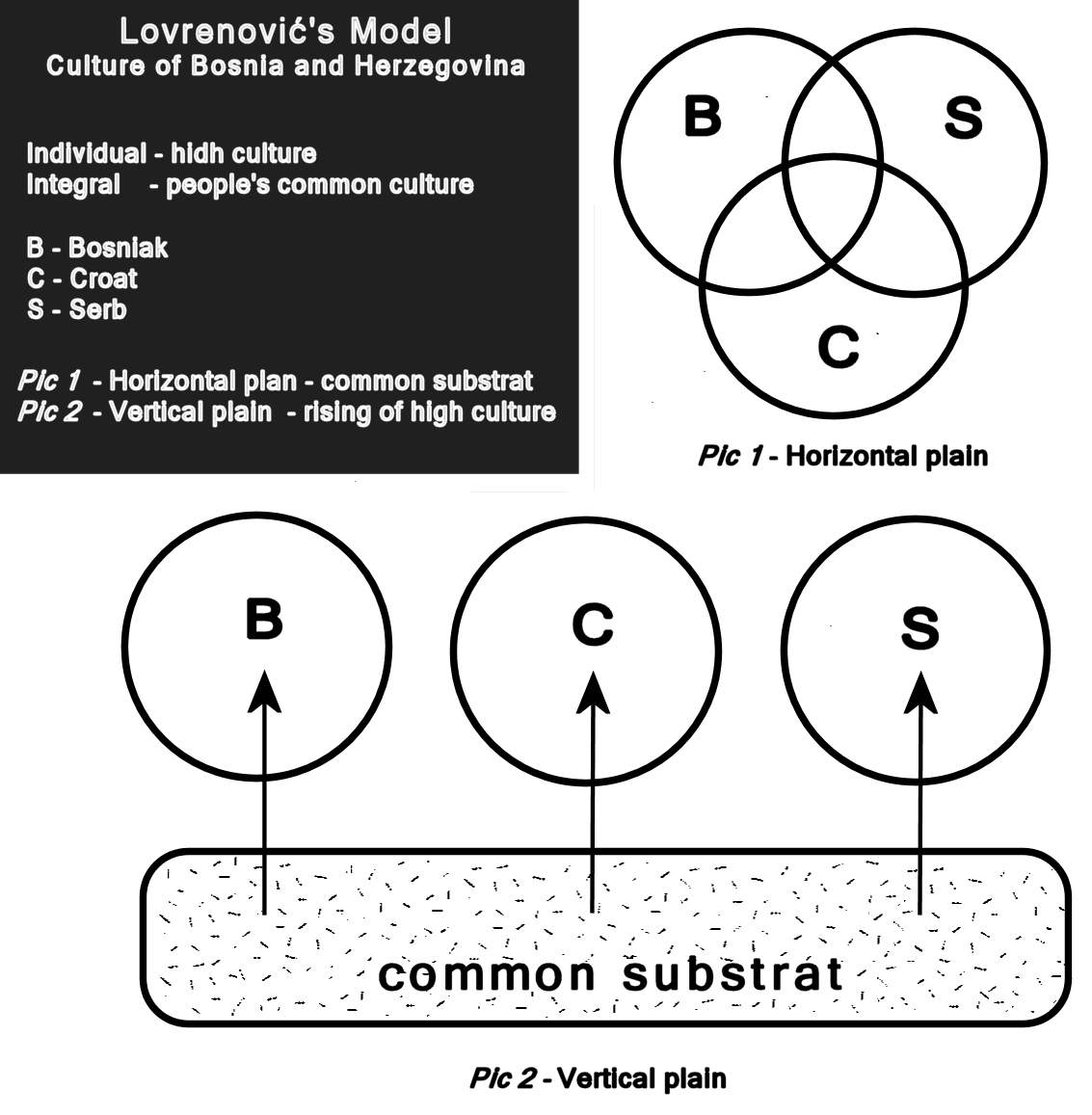
Ivan Lovrenović's diagram of Bosnian integral and particular culture.

The literature of Bosnia and Herzegovina is a complex literary production within Bosnia and Herzegovina, which is seen as a unique, singular literature of Bosnia and Herzegovina (Bosnian and Herzegovinian literature, or Bosnian literature), which consists of literary traditions of the people of Bosnia and Herzegovina, including parallel literature of Bosniaks, literature of Bosnian Croats, literature of Bosnian Serbs. and literature of minority groups such as literature of Jews of Bosnia and Herzegovina, literature of Romani of Bosnia and Herzegovina. Depending on the period in history, it is written in Serbo-Croatian, Bosnian, Croatian, and Serbian language, and uses both Latin and Cyrillic scripts, and historically, it used Ladino, Arabic, Persian and Ottoman-Turkish, with a use of peculiar form known as Aljamiado and Arebica. Hence, literature of Bosnia and Herzegovina was realized within the framework of multicultural-civilizational paradigm. It is closely related to other South Slavic literature.

The cultural identity of Bosnia and Herzegovina should be understood through its "composite integrity". The cultural traditions of the Bosnia and Herzegovina peoples are in a specific relationship, which is characterized by a constant oscillation between integral Bosnian identity and national peculiarities. Regardless of social circumstances, periodically even cultural isolationism, neither of these two characteristics have been completely suppressed. Based on this legacy of the contemporary cultural context, the conceptual determinant that is the "literature of the people of Bosnia and Herzegovina" gains the scope which transcends national and state framework when it comes to the possibility of including integral literary traditions of all people historically, and three constituent peoples of Bosnia and Herzegovina in modern sense. The essence is that individual national literature, Croatian, Serbian, Montenegrin and Bosniak, cannot be tied to the borders of nation states anyway, as all these peoples, in the status of a constitutive or national minority, live in all four countries, with a cultural spaces overlapping and interfere with each other.
Such circumstances justify the multiple affiliation of some authors to more than one literature, and the best example is Ivo Andrić, who equally belongs to Bosnian, Serbian and Croatian literature, respectively.

Bosnian literature, which includes literary traditions originated in Bosnia and Herzegovina, according to Muhsin Rizvić is based on:

- awareness of each literary tradition about itself and its own continuity;
- awareness of the Bosnian and Herzegovinian community and commonality which arises from evident tolerance towards other literary traditions, and from knowledge of the autochthonous position of each tradition on Bosnian and Herzegovinian soil;
- awareness of mutual relations that are necessary on the line of common language, on the line of historical destiny of common life and interests of maintenance, on the line of common mutual themes, ideology of social survival, and, finally, on the line of interest of stylistic-aesthetic commonalities and permeation;
- awareness of the innate venturing into the Serbian and Croatian literature of Serbian and Croatian writers - taking Serbian and Croatian literary works as a model in the line of literary and stylistic features of the common language and South Slavic reciprocity.

=== Name ===
Until the middle of the last century, the term "literature in Bosnia and Herzegovina" was in use, but as early as 1950 the literary theory adopts the term "Bosnian and Herzegovinian literature" (or "Bosnian-Herzegovinian literature"; Serbo-Croatian: Bosanskohercegovačka književnost). Author after author argue for its natural application, rejecting criticism that appeared outside of Bosnia and Herzegovina, in Serbia and Croatia. Theorist of literature and other scholars in related fields produced numerous works on the subject, such as 1950 Collection of Contemporary Bosnian-Herzegovinian Prose by Salko Nazečić, Ilija Kecmanović and Marko Marković, 1961 Panorama of Bosnian-Herzegovinian Poetry by Risto Trifković and Panorama of Bosnian-Herzegovinian Prose by Mak Dizdar. In 1970, Radovan Vučković wrote a study On some issues of approach to Bosnian-Herzegovinian literature, while in 1974, Vojislav Maksimović published the anthology Bosnian-Herzegovinian Literary Review 1910-1941, Ivan Kordić published the Anthology of Bosnian-Herzegovinian Poetry, and a three-volume Bosnian-Herzegovinian Literary Chrestomathy was published. Outside Bosnia and Herzegovina in neighboring Croatia and Serbia, the term was not always welcomed, but scholars such as Professor Zvonko Kovač fully embraced it, making clear in 1987 Interpretive Context that the term is "gaining more and more weight as an integral literary-historical concept".

key prerequisite for understanding
Bosnia and Herzegovina's cultural
identity is respect for its composite
integrity.

=== Inter-literary community ===
The interliterary, as part of the study of Literary Comparison, is a study of the concept of interliterariness and interliterary communities.

== History ==
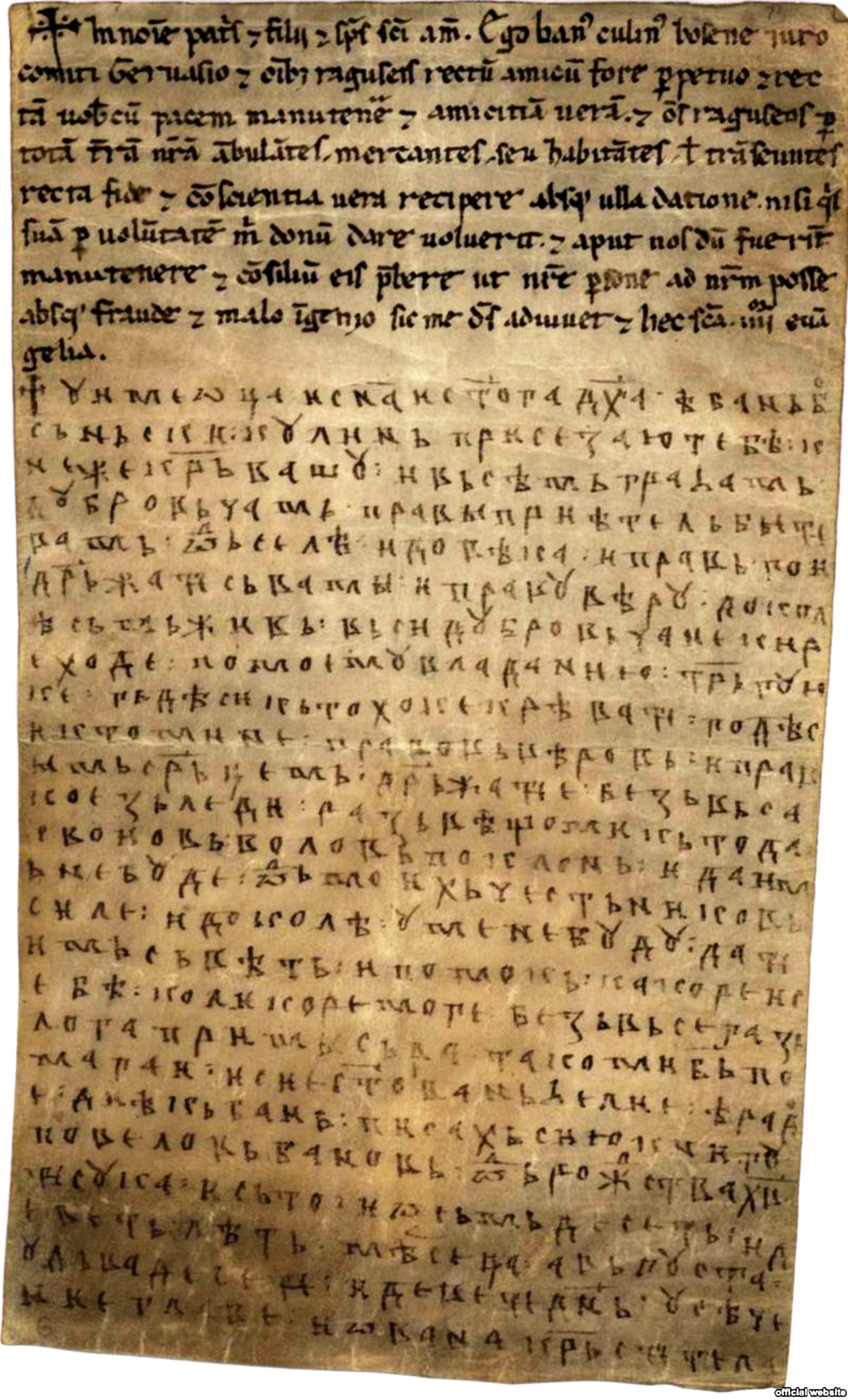
The Ban Kulin Charter dates from 29 August 1189, which is half a century earlier than the first charter of any kind among Germans (1238/9), and just a little later than first such document in Christian Spain and southern France.

Bosnia and Herzegovina literary heritage can be assessed starting back from the Middle Ages. It is closely related to other South Slavic literature, and sometime has been even treated as part of the Serbian and Croatian literature, respectively. Although, not as notable as medieval Serbian, Ragusan or Dalmatian, in terms of quantity, it is, however, among oldest. The first monuments of South Slavic literacy appeared at the Bosnian-Herzegovinian soil. Among the oldest inscriptions, are two written in Bosnian Cyrillic, and both from Bosnia and Herzegovina, the first is grave inscription of the župan of Trebinje, Župan Grd from around 1180, and the second is the church inscription of Ban Kulin from around 1185, found near Visoko, and today it is kept in the Sarajevo Museum. The oldest known charter among South Slavs also originates from Bosnia, and is written in Bosnian vernacular, so-called Narodni jezik (transl. Peoples Language), and in Bosančica (transl. Bosnian Cyrillic). It was the trade agreement between Republic of Ragusa and the Bosnian medieval state of Ban Kulin from 29 August 1189, the Ban Kulin's charter, which appeared half a century earlier than the first charter of any kind among Germans (the first one was from 1238/9), and just a little later than first such document in Christian Spain and southern France.

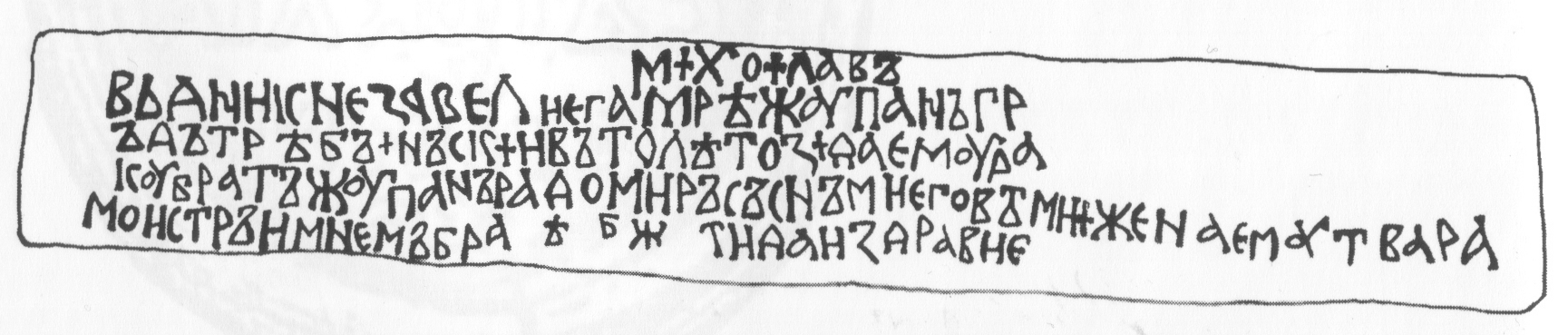
Inscription from stećak of župan Grd, found in Police near Trebinje, the oldest found stećak.

The oldest preserved Bosnian inscriptions are considered to be the Humac tablet (Serbo-Croatian Latin: Humačka ploča, Хумачка плоча, Хумска плоча), Tablet and Charter of Ban Kulin, and stećak inscription of Grdeša, the župan of Trebinje, now in the church in Police near Trebinje, written around 1180. Humac Tablet is inscribed into stone tablet between the 10th and 12th century, which puts it at older date than Tablet of Ban Kulin (cca. 1185) and Charter of Ban Kulin written on 29 August 1189. The text is written is an Old Slavic epigraph in Bosnian Cyrillic script, and dated to the end of the 10th or the beginning of the 11th century, possibly to the beginning of the 12th century.

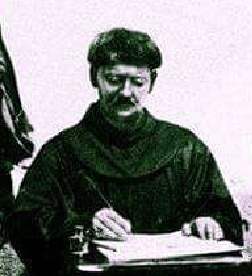
Fra Antun Knežević in 1870, the role of the Bosnian Franciscans became crucial, and their production integral part of the Bosnia and Herzegovina literature.

Sometime between 16th and 17th century Bosnian Muslims, who previously wrote in Arabic and Turkish, now began writing in the spoken local vernacular (Narodni jezik), but used Arabic writing system (also known as Arebica or Arabica), unlike Christians, especially Bosnian Franciscans, who continued to use Bosnian Cyrillic. During 17th century, a more extensive literary activity began to emerge. Also, the three largest religions (Islam, Orthodoxy and Catholicism) began solidifying toward ethnic identity during the late 18th, 19th and early 20th centuries, which pushed the literature in Bosnia and Herzegovina to develop in three directions, all linked to church texts and institutions, but despite differences, the three orientations remained similar in character.

=== Medieval literacy ===
Such medieval writings, found in Bosnia and Herzegovina, produced during medieval period in Bosnian history, which included parts of Dalmatia, Old Herzegovina, revolve around liturgical literature production, such as Divoševo jevanđelje (transl. the Divoš's Gospel), Grškovićev odlomak Apostola (transl. the Gršković's fragment of the Acts of the Apostles), the Hrvoje's Missal, Hval's Codex (Hvalov zbornik, or Hvalov rukopis / Хвалов рукопис; transl. Hval's Codex or Hval's Manuscript), Mletačka apokalipsa (transl. the Venetian Apocalypse), Čajniče Gospel (Čajničko jevanđelje), belong to the Bosnian literature, and are considered the written heritage, but not a literature in the strict modern sense.
The manuscripts belonging to the Bosnian Church, are important part of the literary production during this period. Some of these manuscripts have some iconographic elements which are not in concordance with the supposed theological doctrine of the Christians, like the Annunciation, the Crucifixion and the Ascension. All of the important Bosnian Church books, such as Nikoljsko jevanđelje (transl. the Gospel of St. Nicholas), Srećkovićevo jevanđelje (transl. the Srećković's Gospel), Hvalov zbornik (transl. the Manuscript of Hval), Radosavljeva bosanska knjiga (or Rukopis krstjanina Radosava, or Zbornik krstjanina Radosava; transl. the Manuscript of Krstjanin Radosav), are based on Glagolitic Church books.

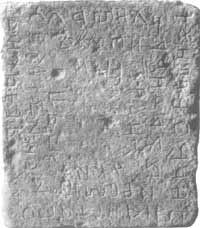
Humac tablet

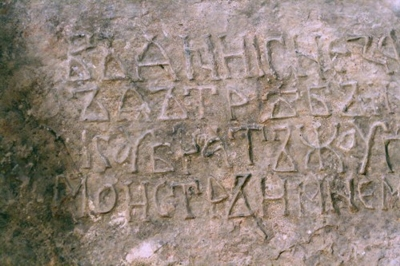
Tablet of Župan Grd, kept in Trebinje

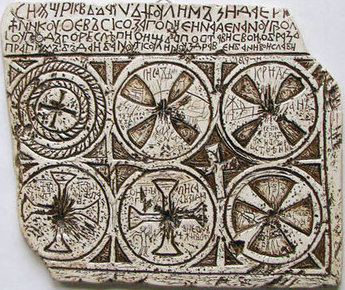
Ban Kulin's tablet, kept in Sarajevo

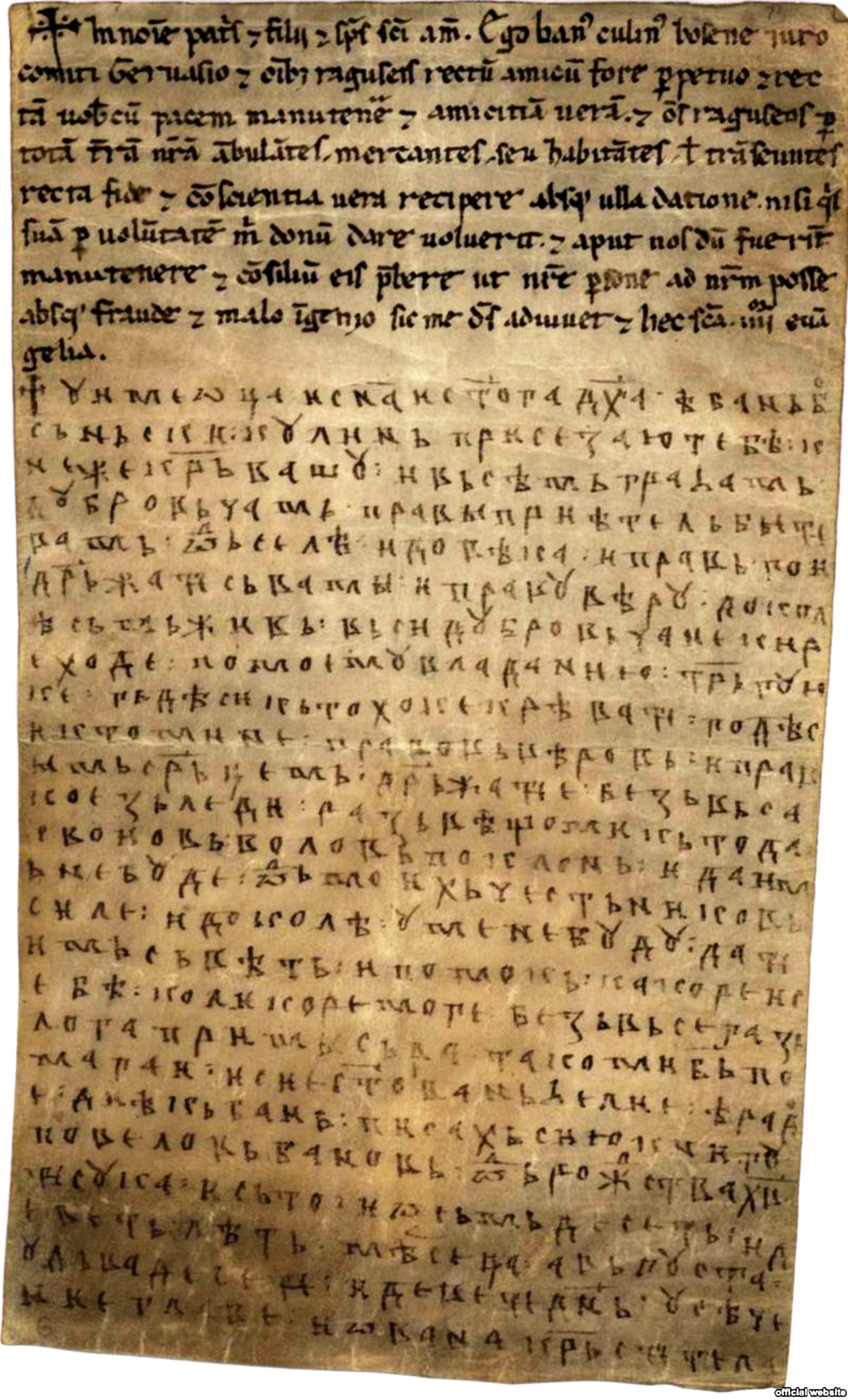
Ban Kulin's Charter, kept in Russia

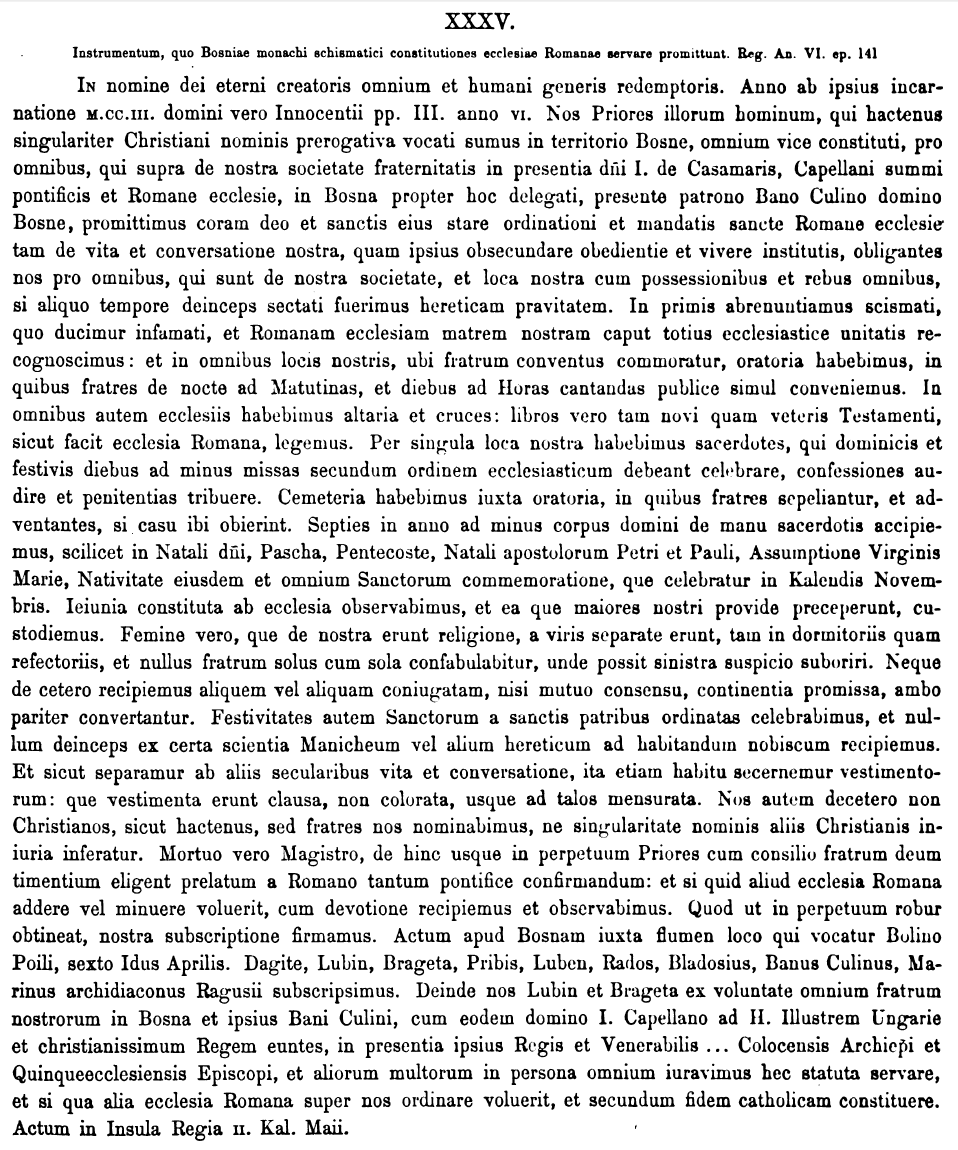
Statement of Bilino Polje

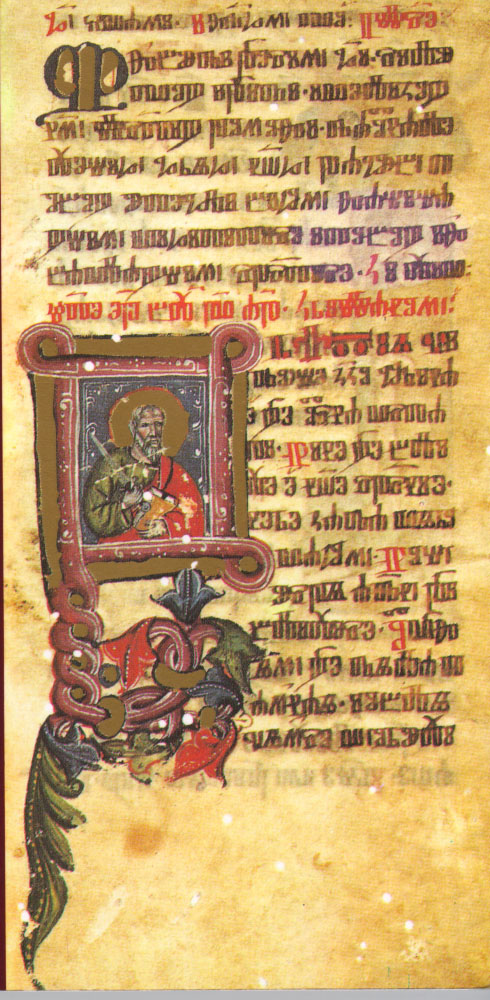
Hrvoje's Missal, kept in Topkapı Palace Manuscript Library

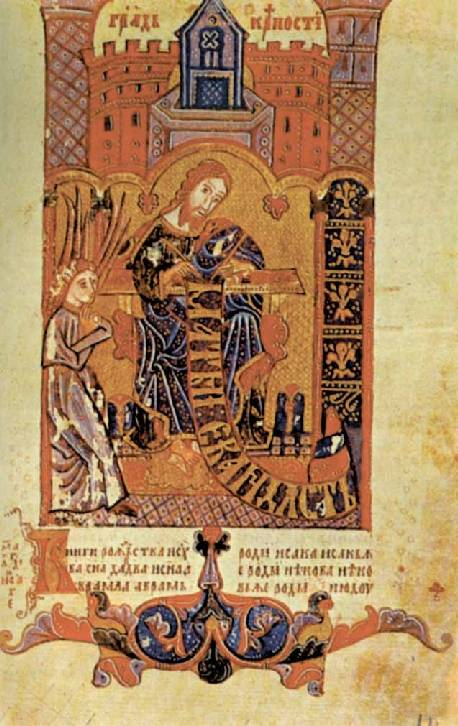
A miniature from the Hval Manuscript, kept in the Bologna's University Library

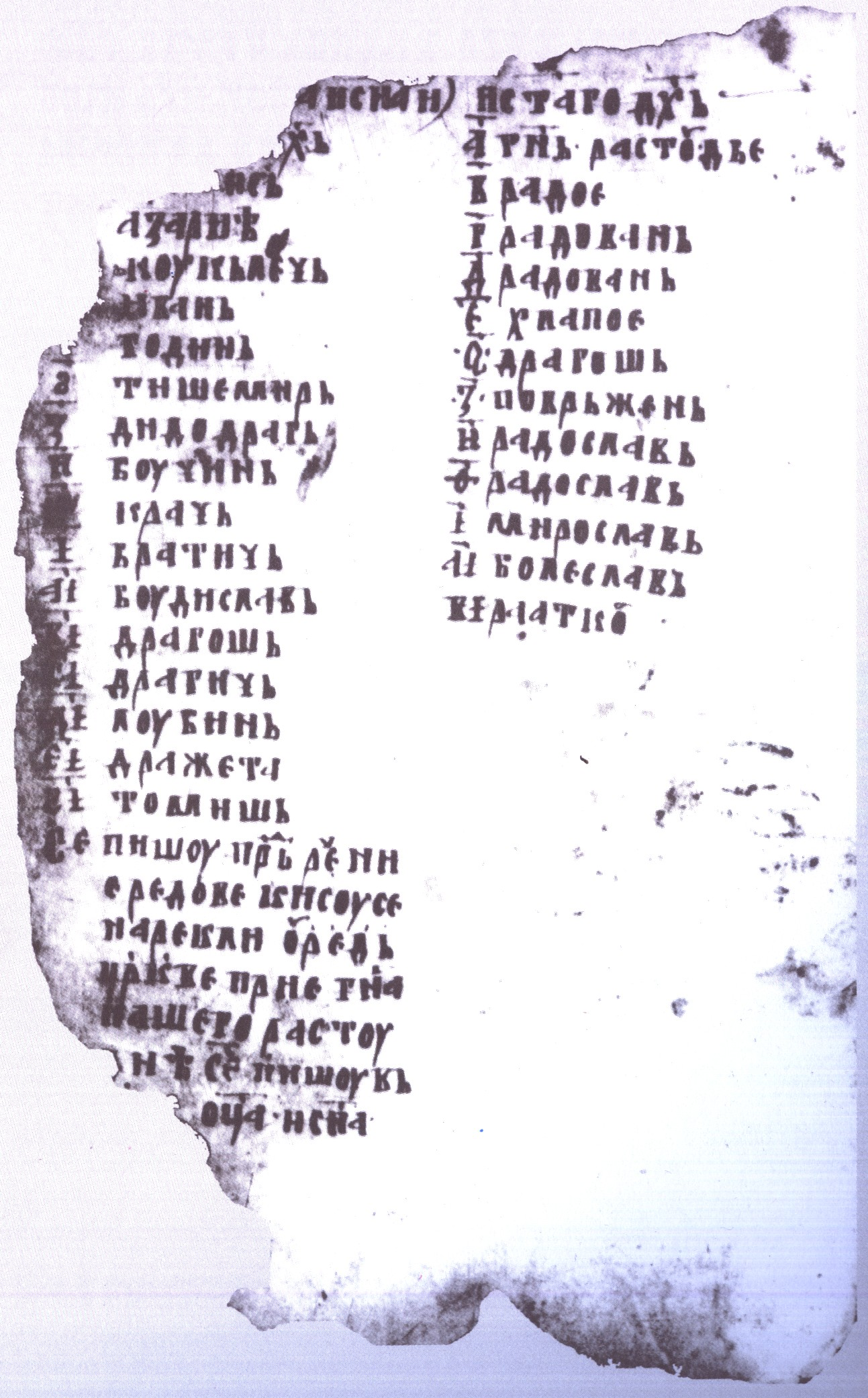
List of Bosnian Church Djed from Batalo's Gospel, kept National Library of Russia

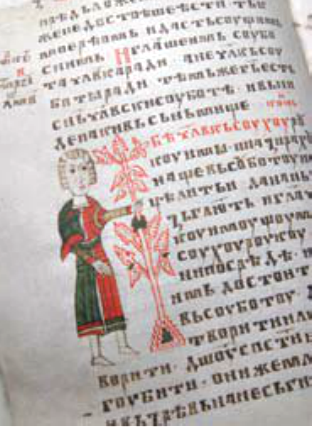
Divoš's Gospel

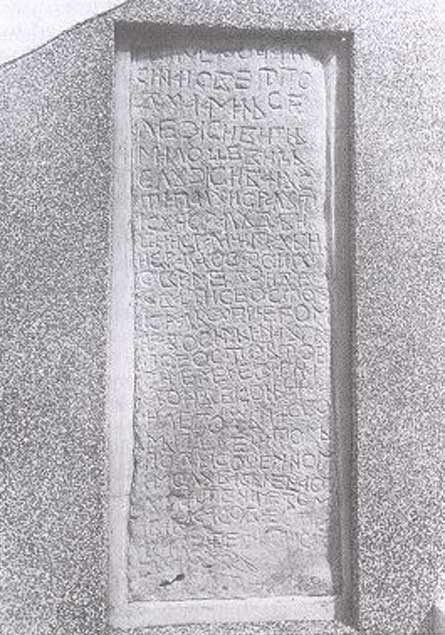
Kočerin tablet

Humačka ploča (Humska ploča / Хумачка плоча, Хумска плоча; transl. the Humac Tablet) is an Old Slavic epigraph in the form of a stone tablet, written in Bosnian Cyrillic script, and carved into a stone slab. It is thought to have originated between the 10th and 12th centuries, making it the oldest surviving Bosnian text, older even than Charter of Ban Kulin It is the oldest Cyrillic epigraph found in Bosnia and Herzegovina, and it was found in the village of Humac in Bosnia and Herzegovina. The tablet was never precisely dated, but some attempts included Yugoslav and Bosnian epigrapher and medievalist, Marko Vego, who dated it to the end of the 10th or the beginning of the 11th century, same dating suggested linguist Jovan Deretić, while historian Dimitrije Bogdanović dated it to the beginning of the 12th century. The text of the tablet tells the story about the act of building a church by Krsmir (also rendered Uskrsimir or Krešimir) and his wife Pavica, which was dedicated to the Archangel Michael. The inscription is carved in form of a quadrangle in Bosnian Cyrillic script among which five Glagolitic letters can be identified, four E-like letters resembling Ⰵ and a Ⱅ letter alongside a conventional Cyrillic Т. It was first noted by a French diplomat to the Bosnia Vilayet. Today, tablet is kept at the local museum of the Franciscan friary in the same village where it was found, namely Humac.

Ploča župana Grda (transl. Župan Grd's Tablet) is another inscribed stone tablet from Trebinje, today's Herzegovina. It was cut around 1180 as a gravestone tablet for Župan Grd, during the rule of the Grand Prince of Duklja Mihailo. The tablet is kept in the church in Police near Trebinje.

Ploča Kulina bana (transl. Tablet of Ban Kulin) is the church inscription of Ban Kulin from around 1185, found near Visoko, and today kept in the National Museum of Bosnia and Herzegovina.

Povelja Bana Kulina (Serbo-Croatian: Povelja Kulina bana / Повеља Кулина бана; transl. the Charter of Ban Kulin) is the first diplomatic document written by the scribe named Radoje in the old Bosnian language, and represents the oldest work written in the Bosnian Cyrillic script (Bosančica), and one of the oldest written state documents in the region. It was written on 29 August 1189 as a trade agreement between the Banate of Bosnia and the Republic of Ragusa. The charter is written in two languages: Latin and an old form of Shtokavian dialect, with the Shtokavian part being a loose translation of the Latin original.
As such, it is of particular interest to both linguists and historians. Apart from the trinitarian invocation (U ime oca i sina i svetago duha), which characterizes all charters of the period, the language of the charter is completely free of Church Slavonic influence. The language of the charter reflects several important phonological changes that have occurred in Bosnian until the 12th century:
Linguistic analysis however does not point to any specific characteristics of the Dubrovnikan speech, but it does show that the language of the charter has common traits with Ragusan documents from the first half of the 13th century, or those in which Ragusan scribal offices participated.

Statement of Bilino Polje, is the statement from 1203, in which Bosnian ban Kulin and high prelates of the Bosnian Church declared that they were renouncing heretical teachings of the Bosnian Church.

Hrvojev misal (transl. Hrvoje's Missal) is liturgical book, written in Split by the resident calligrapher and glagolitic scribe Butko in 1404 for Hrvoje Vukčić Hrvatinić sometime around 1403–1404. Missal found its way to Istanbul and is currently kept at the Topkapı Palace Museum Manuscript Library. The knowledge of its existence was lost, until it was mentioned by linguists Vatroslav Jagic, L. Thallóczy and F. Wickhoff in the 19th Century. The book's location in the Topkapi Palace was determined by the art historian Mara Harisijadis in 1963. Once bound in precious covers, from 19th century Hrvoje's Missal is in leather binding, is considered as one of the most beautiful Glagolitic books. It contains 247 folios, which includes 96 miniatures and 380 initials and many more small initials. Some details are made of golden leaves. It is written in two columns on 488 pp (22.5x31 cm), and contains also some music notation. Some initials contain architectural elements of the Dalmatian city of Split. The peculiarity and particular value of the Hrvoje's Missal lies in its combination of eastern and western principles in terms of composition and contents, thus making it a truly invaluable work with a place in the regional and transregional history of art.

Hvalov zbornik (Hvalov zbornik, or Hvalov rukopis / Хвалов рукопис; transl. Hval's Codex or Hval's Manuscript) is a Bosnian Cyrillic manuscript of 353 pages, written in Split in 1404, for Duke Hrvoje Vukčić Hrvatinić. It was illuminated by Gothic artists from the Dalmatian littoral. It was written by krstjanin Hval in Bosnian Cyrillic in the Ikavian accent, with a Glagolitic alphabet introduction, and is decorated with miniatures and other artistic elements. The codex contains parts of the Bible, hymns and short theological texts, and it was copied from an original Glagolitic text, also evident from Glagolitic letters found in two places in the book. The codex is one of the most famous manuscripts belonging to the Bosnian Church, in which there are some iconographic elements which are not in concordance with the supposed theological doctrine of Christians (Annunciation, Crucifixion and Ascension). New analyses of style and painting techniques show that they were inscribed by at least two miniaturists. One painter was painting on the blue background, and the other was painting on the gold background in which the miniatures are situated in a rich architectonic frame. The codex is kept in the University Library in Bologna, Italy.

Radosavljeva bosanska knjiga (or Rukopis krstjanina Radosava, or Zbornik krstjanina Radosava; transl. the Manuscript of the Christian Radosav or the Anthology of the Christian Radosav) is the youngest, different in content and scarce in relation to the other two anthologies of medieval Bosnian literature - the Hval's from 1404 and the Venetian's from the beginning of the 15th. It consists of 60 sheets of paper, size 14, 3x11 cm. It was named after the scribe Radosav the Christian, who wrote it for Gojsav the Christian, during the reign of the Bosnian king Tomaš (1443-1461). The main content is the Apocalypse of John the Apostle. It is written in Bosnian Cyrillic, with the Glagolitic alphabet used in two places. It is decorated with two flags and a series of decorative initials. It is kept in the Vatican Library.

Mletačka Apokalipsa (transl. Venetian Apocalypse) was written at the end of the 14th or the beginning of the 15th century. The exact dating has never been determined because interruptions and gaps the manuscript, with a missing the colophon, which probably existed, which means that both the writer or the patron remain unknown. Approximate dating is based on palaeographic and linguistic analysis of the manuscript. It very closely resembles to Hval's Codex in terms of language, but even more so in terms of individual chapters and their layout. The manuscript was first mentioned in 1719, and in 1794 it was already studied by Josef Dobrowsky, who described its contents. The manuscript is written more beautifully and legibly than Hval's, and the letters are slightly larger. It is kept in Venice in the Library of St. Mark.

Čajniče Gospel is the oldest gospel written in medieval Bosnia at the end or the beginning of the 15th century, which probably belonged to the Bosnian noble family, the Pavlovićs, and is the only medieval Bosnian gospel that has been preserved in country to this day. Analyzing the language characteristics and its Ijekavian dialect, it is certain that it originate from ijekavijan eastern Bosnia. The codex was written in shorthand, with a semi-constitution of the Bosnian type, also known as Bosnian Cyrillic. It is estimated that five main scribes took turns, continuously writing the text. The Čajniče Gospel is a four-gospel, and only parts of the Gospel of Matthew, the Gospel of Mark, and most of the Gospel of Luke have been preserved, while the Gospel of John, the beginning and end of the manuscript, and a certain number of pages in the middle, are lost, so that in present condition the manuscript has 167 pages. The codex is declared a National monument of Bosnia and Herzegovina. The museum of the Church of the Assumption of the Blessed Mother of God, of the Čajniče Monastery, in Čajniče, Bosnia and Herzegovina, keeps the book

Kočerinska ploča (or Natpis Vignja Miloševića; transl. Kočerin tablet or Inscription of Viganj Milošević), is a medieval tablet with an inscription cut in 1404 or 1405 on the stone tablet placed on the stećak tombstone of Viganj Milošević, written in Bosnian Cyrillic, in an archaic West Stokavian dialect of Serbo-Croatian, using ikavian subdialect. It was discovered in 1983 in a necropolis of Lipovac, in village Kočerin, near Široki Brijeg, Bosnia and Herzegovina, where it is now exhibited in the parochial premises in Kočerin. The tablet contains 25 rows of script, with 9-15 characters on each line. There are 300 characters in total and represents the largest known text in Bosnian Cyrillic, and displays a large number of ligatures. It is written in a Shtokavian Ikavian dialect, without nasal vowels, in a single-yer script, with some apparent Glagolitic influence. The form svetago shows influence from Church Slavonic, but the rest of the inscription is free of Church Slavonicisms in its morphology. The text says how Viganj Milošević served five Bosnian rulers, Banus Stjepan, King Tvrtko, King Dabiša, Queen Gruba, and King Ostoja, and ends with a message: имолꙋвасьненаст ꙋпаитенамеѣсмь билькаковиесте виꙉетебитикако вьсмьѣ (transl. And I beg you do not step on me because I was as you are and you shall be as I am).

Batalovo jevanđelje (transl. Batalo's Gospel) is dated to 1393. The gospel was written by the scribe (in medieval Bosnia called dijak) Stanko Kromirijanin. The tepčija Batalo Šantić was the scribe's patron. Four pages of the gospel are preserved, and are held in National Library of Russia in Saint Petersburg. On the third preserved page the scribe Stanko states that he was writing an ornate gospel for Batalo, dating its completion to 1393, during the reign of Dabiša. On page two, there is a list of djed of the Bosnian Church. Researchers call this list „Red gospodina Rastudija“ (Order of Bishop Rastudije), and is understood as a list of names of all Bosnian Church bishops before and after him.

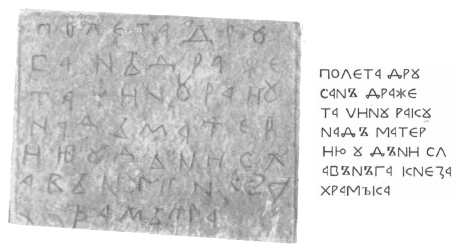
12th century inscription from Bosnia and Herzegovina: "Poleta, Drusan, Dražeta buried their mother in the days of the glorious prince Hramko".

==== Stećak inscriptions ====
Earliest stećak inscriptions could be traced back to 12th century medieval Bosnia.

=== Ottoman period ===
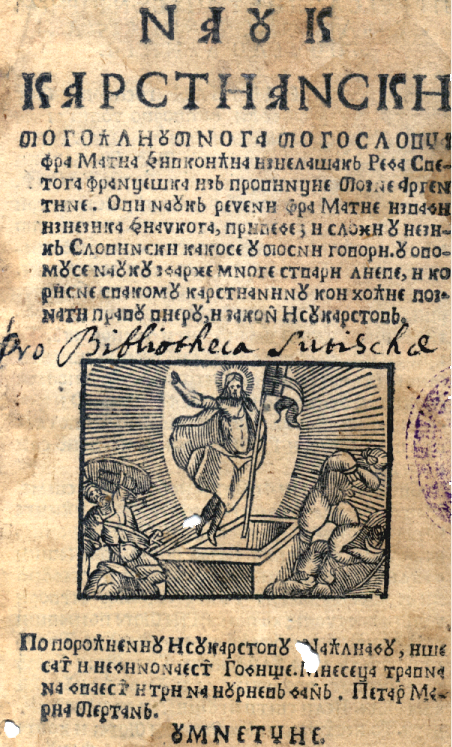
Divković's Nauk krstjanski

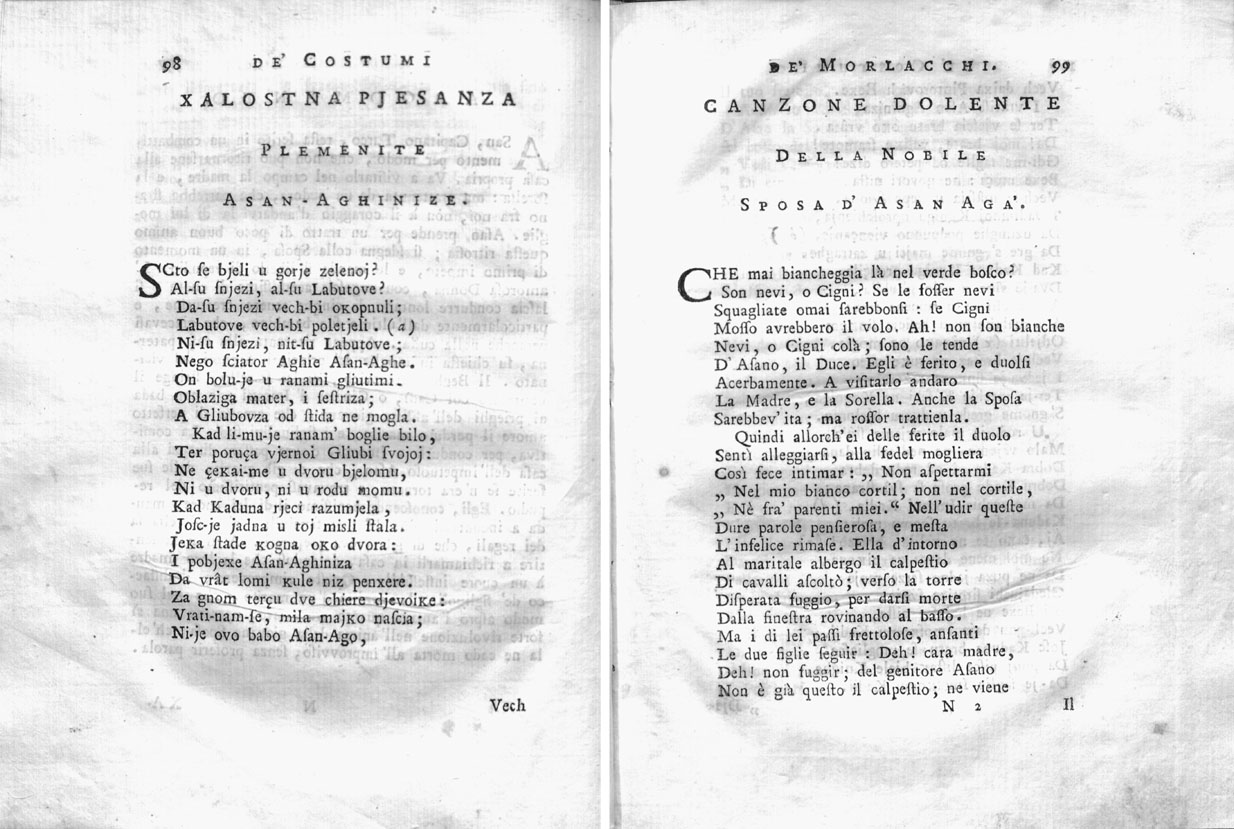
First addition of Hasanaginica

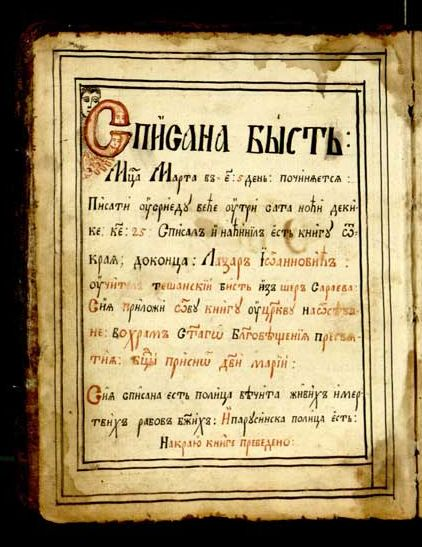
Epistle

Free Will and Acts of Faith

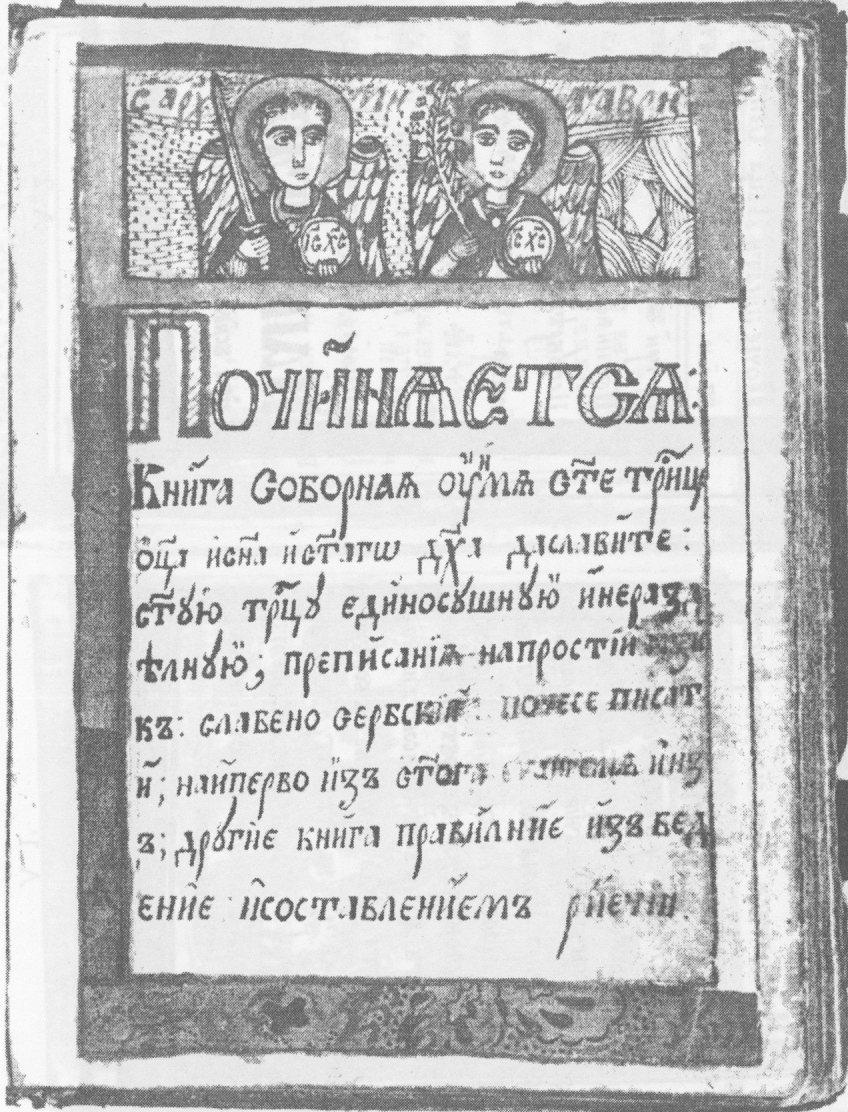

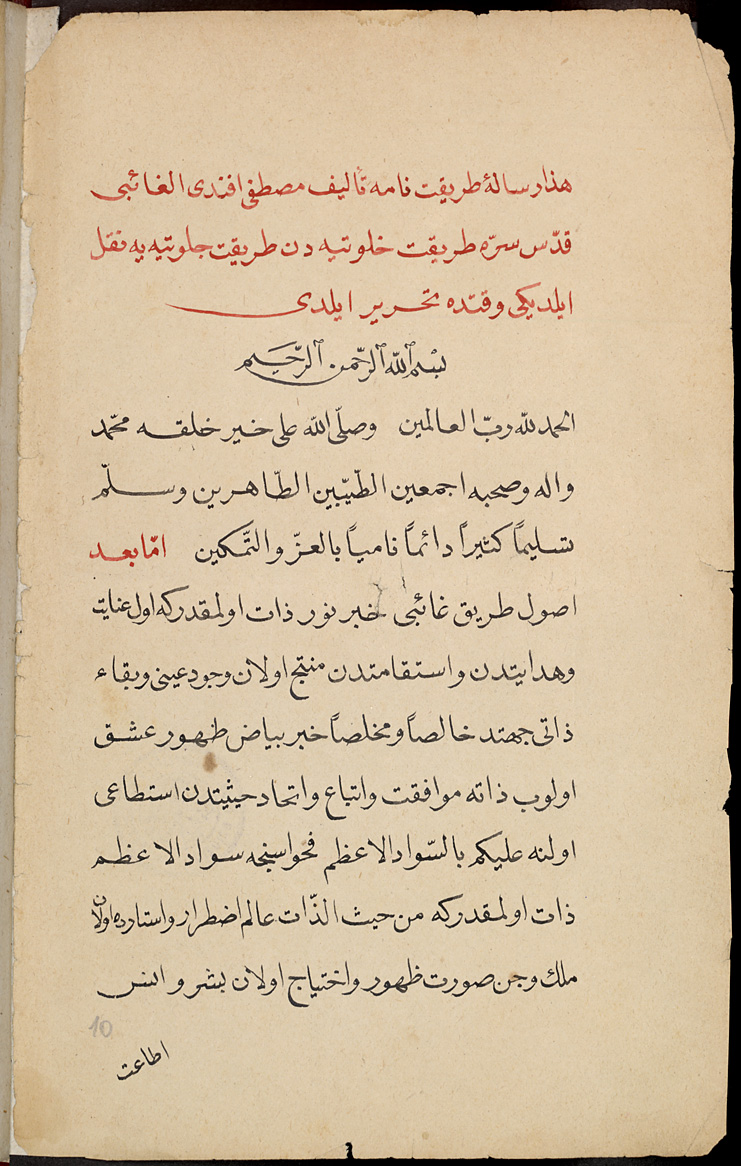
Risāle-i tarīkatnāme

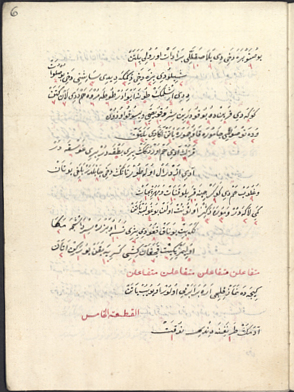
The first dictionary of:Bosnian language, complied in 1631 by Muhamed Hevaji Uskufi Bosnevi.

The Bosnian Book of the Science of Conduct, published in 1831 by Abdulvehab Ilhamija Žepčevi.

Bosnian Franciscan and writer, Matija Divković (1563 – 1631), is considered to be the founder of modern Bosnia and Herzegovina literature. He wrote in narodni jezik (transl. Peoples Language), which was, beside Bosnian, at the time, a common name among Bosnians for the South Slavic language, Štokavian dialect. As a translator, he was not meticulous about being faithful to his sources, which means that he modified them to bring them closer to the folk mixed idiom of the Eastern-Bosnian Štokavian dialect and Ikavian–Ijekavian accent, spoken between Olovo and Kreševo in Bosnia.

Martin Nedić was prominent 19th century poet, who wrote historical poems as well as commemorative, with eventful and often sacramental content. He also wrote memos from Bosnia, compiled reports about the state of Catholic schools, and collected and published historical materials and national treasures.

The Bosnian author and poet, Abdulvehab Ilhamija's final work, the Bosnian Book of the Science of Conduct, is a work that lists 54 religious duties, followed by advises on what a religious person should and should not do. It was published posthumously in 1831, a decade after his death. The book is printed in Arebica, the variant of Perso-Arabic script used to write Bosnian language.

Mustafa Ejubović was born in a Bosnian family in Mostar in 1651. His father Jusuf was a distinguished professor. He finished maktab and madrasa in Mostar before departing for Constantinople to study in 1677. There he listened to lectures on philosophy, astronomy and mathematics, and after he graduated, he got a professorship at a lower madrasa in Constantinople, becoming famous for his lectures. Ejubović wrote 27 treatises on logic during his lifetime. In addition to his native Bosnian language, he was fluent in Arabic, Turkish and Persian.

Muhamed Hevaji Uskufi Bosnevi is noted as the author of the first "Bosnian-Turkish" dictionary in 1631, Magbuli 'ari, one of the earliest dictionaries of the Bosnian language. A hand-copy dating from 1798 is currently kept at the City Archive of Sarajevo. The dictionary, written in verse, contains more than 300-word explanations and over 700 words translated between Bosnian and Turkish. He is also the author of the religious and moral writing "Tabsirat al-'arifin" which is written partly in Turkish and partly in Bosnian, and the number of poems in Turkish and Bosnian. Other prominent authors of the ear were Mustafa Gaibi, Lazar Jovanović, Safvet-beg Bašagić.

==== Hasanaginica ====
Some of widely acclaimed folk ballads are written during Ottoman period in Bosnia and Herzegovina history, namely Hasanaginica (lit. English: Hassan-Aga's Wife; transl. the Mourning Song of the Noble Wife of the Asan Aga), written in "narodni jezik" before 1646, translated into European languages by figures such as Goethe, Walter Scott, Pushkin and Mérimée. It has also been translated into Latin, Czech, Polish, Ukrainian, Swedish, Hungarian, Slovenian and many other languages. It was picked up by Alberto Fortis and reordered in Italian in his travelogue Viaggio in Dalmazia (transl. The Road through Dalmatia), published 1774. Many translations followed, in 1775 in German, in Herder's collection Voices of the People, first translated by Clemens Werthes and later by Goethe. Walter Scott translated it into English in 1799 (published in 1924), Mérimée in 1827, Nerval in 1830, and Fauriel in 1832 into French, Pushkin in 1835 into Russian.

==== Bašagić Collection ====
Safvet-beg Bašagić was a Bosnian intellectual and erudite, who was a collector, writer, journalist, poet, translator, professor, bibliographer, curator of a museum, politician. He collected and preserved a significant segment of Bosnian literature and Muslim literary heritage of Bosnian Ottoman period. His collection of Islamic manuscripts and prints comprises Arabic, Persian and Turkish works and rare Bosnian texts written in Arabic script. Bašagić's collection contains, at the same time, unique manuscripts and essential works of medieval Islamic scholarly literature and belles-lettres, spanning the interval from 12th to 19th century, and prints from two centuries, starting from 1729. The 284 manuscript volumes and 365 printed volumes portray the more than a thousand year long development of Islamic civilization from its commencement to the beginning of 20th century. Especially the authorship and language aspect of the collection represents a bridge between different cultures and a certain overlap thereof. The very history of the journey of Bašagić's collection of Islamic manuscripts and prints was dramatic. Bašagić tried to deposit the collection in a more secure place than was the Balkan region of his time. In the turmoil of the turbulent development of Balkan nations in 19th and 20th centuries, his valuable collection eventually ended in the funds of the University Library in Bratislava.

=== Modern period ===
Probably the most well known author, described as an "illustrative product of the ‘syncretic culture of Bosnia’" is the Nobel Prize in Literature laureate Ivo Andrić, for whom Ivan Lovrenović concluded, "(i)f Bosnia and Herzegovina, in its entire cultural history, has something that is truly of a planetary cultural value, then it is Ivo Andrić". who received the Nobel Prize in Literature in 1961 at age 69, for his "Bosnian trilogy" which includes novels Na Drini ćuprija (1945) The Bridge on the Drina, Travnička Hronika (1945) (transl. Travnik Chronicle) and Gospođica (1945) (transl. Little Miss), mentioning his narrative work in Pripovijetke (1947). He used his prize-money, monetary part of the award in amount of around 30 million dinars estimated to excess of 1 million euros in today value, and donated the entire sum to Bosnia and Herzegovina for the construction of libraries and the purchase of books. Andrić did the same with all prize-money he received as monetary part of the awards, such as the AVNOJ Award from 1967 and the 27 July Award from 1970, all of which were given and used for the development of Bosnia and Herzegovina librarianship and increase of the library fund.
Thanks to Andrić wish that the original manuscript of the novel The Bridge on the Drina be kept in Sarajevo, the current Museum of Literature and Theater Arts was established in the city. The museum is located in the Baščaršija neighborhood in the heart of Sarajevo, in the old Skarić family traditional mansion, built in the middle of the 19th century, which was donated to City of Sarajevo by later owners the Despić family.

Meša Selimović is another prominent Bosnian novelist, whose novel the Death and the Dervish is one of the most important literary works in post-World War II Bosnia and Herzegovina and Yugoslavia. Just like in case of Andrić, his main themes are related to his native country, Bosnia. Also, he was concerned with the relations between individuality and authority, life and death, and existential realities of everyday life. Selimović is representative of the new historical type of prose which had strongest impact and has left the strongest trace in contemporary Bosnian literature. The motives of the writers' turn to the past rested in an effort to tell the truth about the present age and its dramas, through the lens and decor of bygone historical era as allegorical backdrop. The most important such Selimović novels are the Dervish and Death, in 1966, and the Fortress, in 1970.

Branko Ćopić is considered to be the favorite writer of Children's literature. Mak Dizdar, as a young poet, showed a distinct social charge with a collection of poems "Vidovopoljska noć", for which it was censored by the regime in Yugoslavia during interwar period. With this collection, Dizdar has joined a whole generation of poets who understand literature as a field of revolutionary struggle.

==== Romani Bosnian literature ====
Romani Bosnian culture and literature is represented by authors such as Rade Uhlik, who was prominent Bosnian-Herzegovinian romologist, linguist, academic and writer.

== Bosnian Franciscans contribution and influence ==
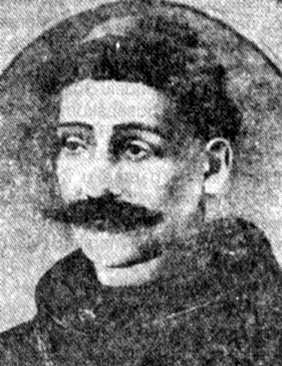
Marijan Šunjić

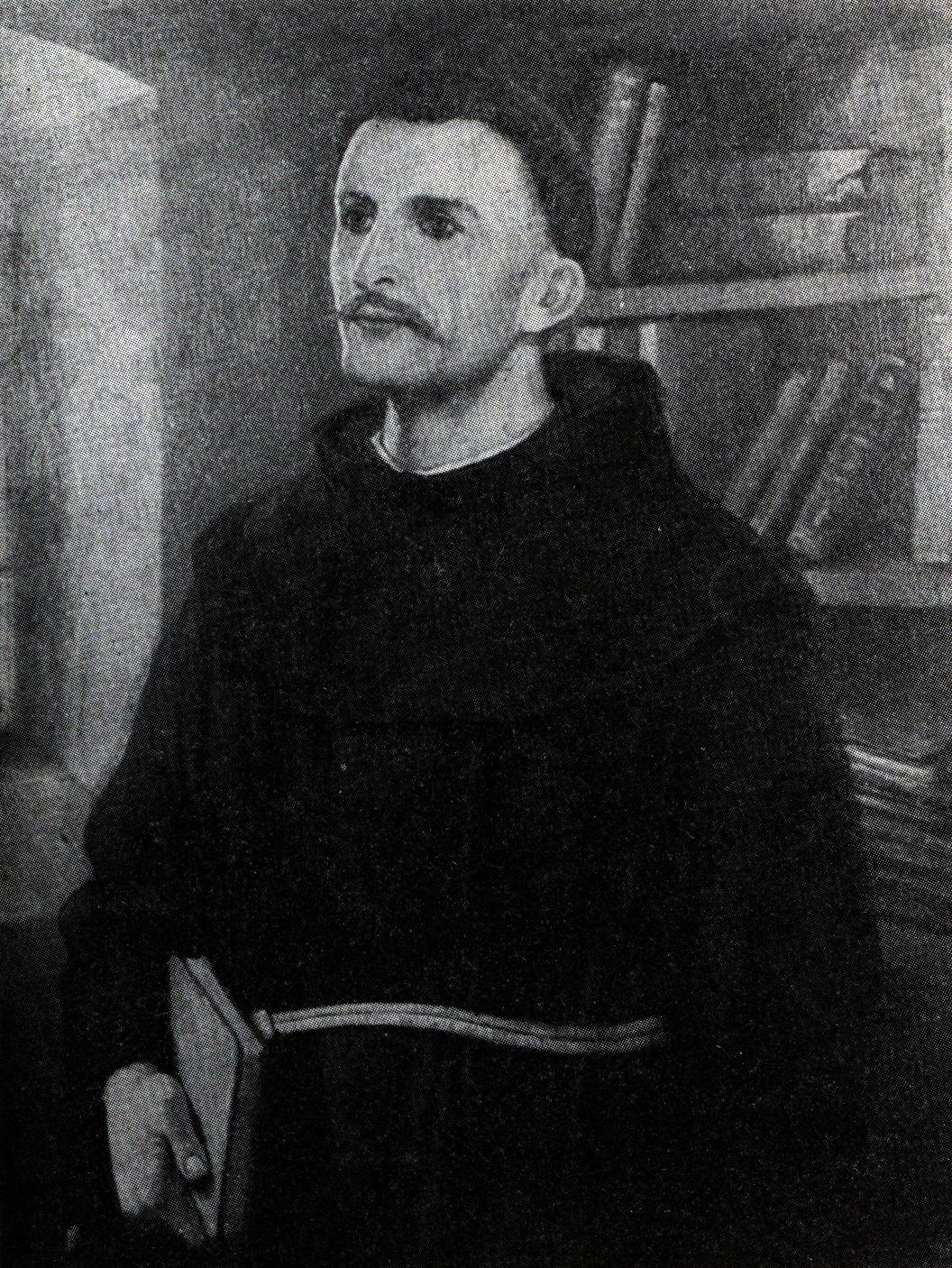
Ivan Frano Jukić

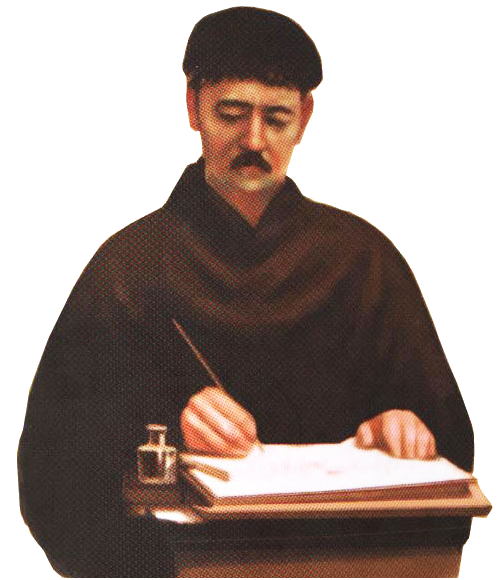
Fra Antun Knežević

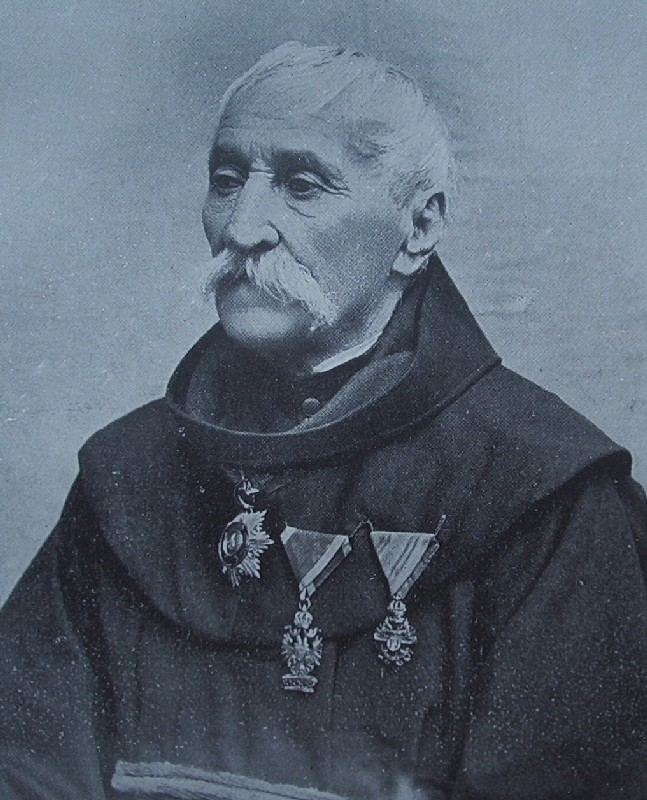
Grgo Martić

Matija Divković, Filip Lastrić, Bono Benić, Marijan Šunjić, Antun Knežević, Ivan Frano Jukić, Grgo Martić are but few of most prominent Bosnian Franciscans who wrote in various periods of Bosnian history. Matija Divković is distinguished with the historical title of the founding father of the Bosnia and Herzegovina literature.

This means that he was Bosnian Franciscan who wrote in narodni jezik (transl. Peoples Language), which, beside Bosnian, was a common name for the South Slavic language, Štokavian dialect, among Bosnians at the time. Divković was not always an original writer, but a translator and compiler. As a translator, he was not meticulous about being faithful to his sources, which means that he modified them to bring them closer to the folk mixed idiom of the Eastern-Bosnian Štokavian dialect and Ikavian–Ijekavian accent, spoken between Sarajevo, Olovo and Kreševo in Bosnia. His works and his style have been widely and continually researched as part of the Bosnian and Herzegovinian, Croatian, Montenegrin and Serbian written heritage, as the Shtokavian-Iekavian dialect of his native language eventually became the basis of the literary languages developed in all these countries in the 19th century. In his homeland Bosnia and Herzegovina, Divković's legacy and importance, beside the religious doctrine and church teachings that he spread, is signified by his reputation as the first Bosnian typographer who printed the first Bosnian book, written in Bosnian using Bosančica, the language and the alphabet people in Bosnia spoke and could read. Divković wrote his books to meet the needs of the Catholic folk. His Veliki nauk (transl. Greater Doctrine – transl. Greater Christian Doctrine) from 1611 was intended for clerics, while Mali nauk (transl. Lesser Doctrine – transl. Lesser Christian Doctrine) from 1616 became a textbook for the people. The former is made up of several unidentified Latin works (the sermons of John Herolt, Bernardine Bastio, etc.), while the latter is in form of a dialog between a teacher and a student, mixing verses and prose, with various religious and educational themes. Mali nauk (transl. Lesser Doctrine) was one of the most popular books in Bosnia and Herzegovina and widely used in neighboring Dalmatia, and had as many as eight editions. Divković wrote his first work, Christian Doctrine for the Slavic People, while serving as a chaplain in Sarajevo and started to translate One Hundred Miracles or Signs of the Blessed and Glorious Virgin. In 1611 he traveled to Republic of Venice, where he first had the Bosnian Cyrillic letters molded, and then printed both works. In 1612, Divković came back to Bosnia to the friary of Kreševo and started writing his most important book, Divković's Words on Sunday Gospel All Year Round, completed in Olovo in 1614. It was also printed in bosančica in Venice 1616 (2nd edition in 1704), as well as Christian Doctrine with Many Spiritual Matters (1616, several later editions).

Anto Knežević, as a writer and historian, was one of the main proponents of Bosniak nationhood, and a major theme of his works was fierce advocating against imminent Croatization of Bosnian Catholics on one side, as well as imminent Serbianization of Bosnian Orthodox people on the other. His position and doctrine clearly reflected in his literary works was that all Bosnians or Bosniaks are one people of three faiths, and that up to the late 19th century no Croats and Serbs lived in Bosnia and Herzegovina. This is most visible in his Rieč popa Gojka Miroševića svojem Bošnjakom i Hercegovcem, Rieč Hodže bosanskog Hadži Muje Mejovića, Rieč hodže Petrovačkog bratiji Turcima, Suze bošnjaka nad grobnicom kralja svoga u Jajcu, Krvava knjiga, Opet o grobu bosanskom, Kratka povjest kralja bosanski, and Pad Bosne, but most notably in his Letter to Kallay, in which Anto Knežević communicate his stances to the Austro-Hungarian Empire governor for Bosnia, Béni Kállay. He also opened the first public school in Bosnia in his own house. Another proponent of Bosnian or Bosniak identity of all three faiths in Bosnia was Ivan Frano Jukić, who was Knežević's mentor. Jukić was a founder and editor of the very first literary magazine in Bosnia and Herzegovina, Bosanski prijatelj (Bosnian Friend), Jukić was an advocate of the religion-independent cultural identity for all the people in the country, which put in practice the idea of universal civic education not tied to religious affiliation. For him, as Ivan Lovrenović observed in his seminal work Bosanski Hrvati, ethnic and denominational borders of the Bosnian microcosm were neither absolute, nor God-given.

== Jewish, Aljamiado and Arebica ==
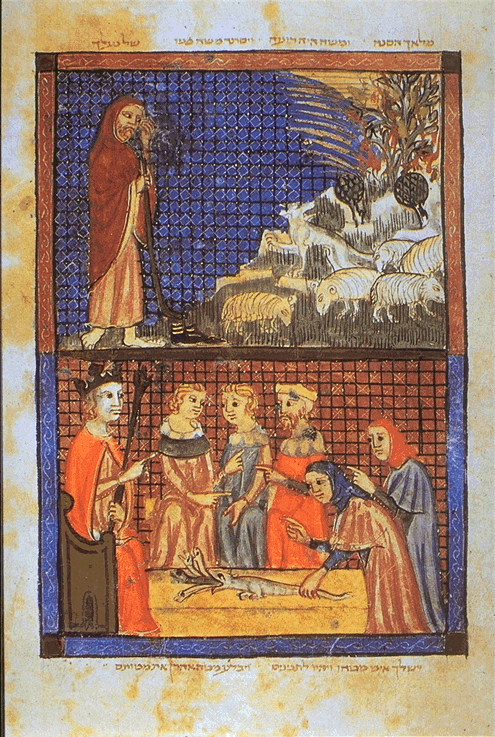
An illustrated page from the Sarajevo Haggadah, written in 14th century Catalonia..

Appearance of Aljamiado literature coincide with an influx of Sephardi Jews populations, during expulsion from Spain. The practice of Jews using the Arabic script and/or Hebrew script for transcribing European languages, especially Romance languages such as Ladino, Aragonese or Catalans is referred to as aljamiado.

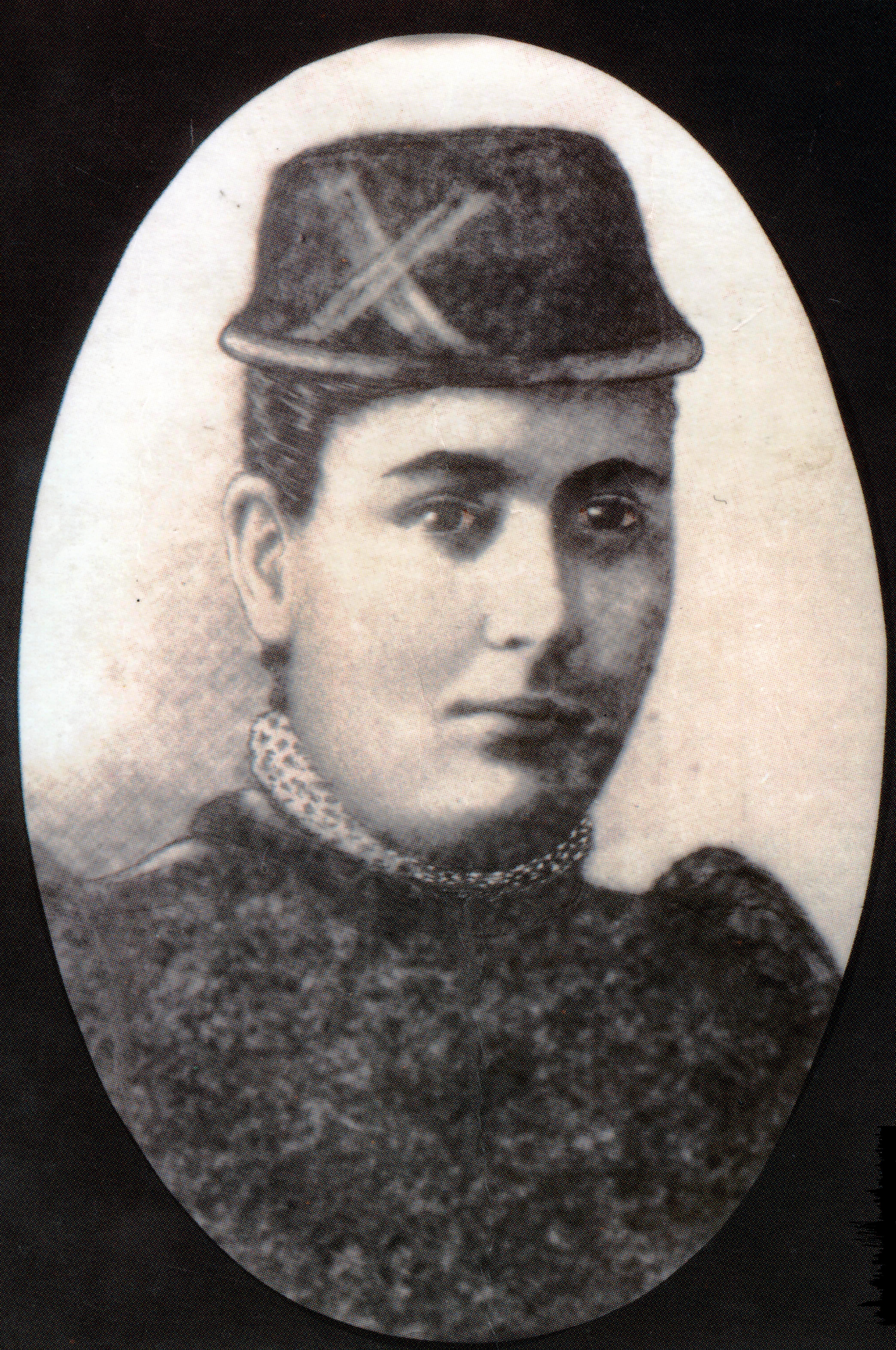
Laura Papo Bohoreta (1891–1942) was a prominent Bosnian-Jewish writer and the first Bosnian feminist.

It was adopted by Bosnian Muslims, who previously wrote in Arabic and Turkish, now began writing in the spoken local vernacular (Narodni jezik), but used Arabic writing (Arebica or Arabica), unlike Christians, especially Bosnian Franciscans, who continued to use Bosnian Cyrillic. This happened sometime between 16th and 17th century, coinciding with the development of post-medieval folk-oriented literature of Bosnian Franciscans. Both phenomenons initiated native Bosnian language, or Narodni jezik (transl. People's Language, Folk Language) as a literary language for the first time since the medieval period. However, appearance and development of Aljamiado literature, written in vernacular language in Arabic script. also coincided with the social upheavals, resulting in reduced chances for people getting education, especially in border regions. Relying on modest educational resources, together with discontinuity of Bosnian Muslim literacy in relation to medieval legacy and isolation of cultural background from local and foreign language traditions, makes Aljamiado authors autodidacts. The phenomenon of Bosnian Aljamiado poetry depended completely on tradition and individual talent.

=== Arebica ===
The handbook, Bosnian Book of the Science of Conduct published in 1831 by the Bosnian author and poet Abdulvehab Ilhamija, is printed in Arebica.

The word aljamiado is also used for other languages, such as Bosnian (Serbo-Croatian), written with Arabic letters. This practice flourished during Ottoman period, although, some linguists prefer to limit the term to Romance languages and using name Arebica to refer to the use of Arabic script for Bosnian language instead. It was used mainly between the 15th and 19th centuries and is frequently categorized as part of Aljamiado literature. Before World War I there were unsuccessful efforts by Bosnian Muslims to adopt Arebica as the third official alphabet for Bosnian alongside Latin and Cyrillic. Arebica was based on the Perso-Arabic script of the Ottoman Empire, with added letters which are not found in Arabic, Persian or Turkish. Full letters were eventually introduced for all vowels, making Arebica a true alphabet, unlike its Perso-Arabic base. The final version of Arebica was devised by Mehmed Džemaludin Čaušević at the end of the 19th century. His version is called Matufovica, Matufovača or Mektebica.

The first literary work to be published in Arebica for 64 years (since 1941) was a comic book "Hadži Šefko i hadži Mefko" in 2005 (authors Amir Al-Zubi and Meliha Čičak-Al-Zubi). The authors made slight modifications to Arebica. The first book in Arebica with an ISBN was "Epohe fonetske misli kod Arapa i Arebica" ("The Age of Phonetic Thought of Arabs and Arebica") in April 2013 in Belgrade by Aldin Mustafić, MSc. This book represents the completion of the standardization of Mehmed Džemaludin Čaušević's version, and is also a textbook for higher education.

=== Islamic manuscripts ===
Following the Islamization of Bosnia, there has been an important Islamic literature produced by Bosniak authors, from works in logic to works in the interpretation of the Qur'an. While most of these works were written in Bosnian, Arabic or in Ottoman Turkish there were also a few works in Persian. These were mostly in the form of Islamic manuscripts.

During the Bosnian War (1992–1996), significant cultural and literary heritage in Bosnia and Herzegovina suffered devastating losses. Among the most tragic was the destruction of the National and University Library in Sarajevo, which was set ablaze in 1992 by Serbian paramilitary forces. The fire resulted in the loss of thousands of books and numerous manuscripts. The event has drawn comparisons to historical acts of cultural destruction, such as Nazi book burnings. The Institute for Oriental Studies also suffered major losses due to sustained shelling, including its extensive collections of Arabic, Turkish, and Persian manuscripts. Fortunately, a two-volume catalogue of these holdings, compiled by Lejla Gazić and Salih Trako, was preserved. In contrast, the Gazi Husrev Bey's Library manuscript collection was successfully protected during the conflict. Its most valuable holdings were moved multiple times for safekeeping and were eventually housed in the Central Bosnian National Bank's treasury.

Today, the Ghazi Husrev-bey Library holds a collection of approximately 200,000 items, including over 10,000 manuscript codices written in Arabic, Turkish, Persian, and Bosnian. These manuscripts encompass around 20,000 works spanning a wide range of disciplines such as Islamic theology, oriental languages, literature, philosophy, logic, history, medicine, veterinary science, mathematics, and astronomy.

== Folklore ==
Bosnian and Herzegovinian folklore is represented mainly through oral tradition. There are also short forms of this type of poetic expression (riddles, proverbs) and voluminous epic works. In addition to epics, poetic folklore is represented by lyric poetry and ballads. In prose, there are stories about funny events, beast fable, fairy tales, anecdotes, as well as legends and traditions.

=== Lyrical poems ===
A special place in the genre of lyrical poetry of Bosnia and Herzegovina is occupied by sevdalinka (love poem, from the Arabic word sevda - love, passion), which was created under the influence of oriental culture, which came to Bosnia after the conquest of the Ottoman Empire. In sevdalinka, oriental motifs overlap with Slavic traditions, resulting in an independent genre. One of the most well-known sevdalinka is Emina, written by Aleksa Šantić who wrote a number of poems in the style of these Bosnian love songs.

In addition to sevdalinka, wedding songs, lullabies and co-known sevdalinka is Emina, written by Aleksa Šantić who wrote a number of poems Intangible Cultural Heritage.

=== Romances and ballads ===
Thematically, ballads of Bosnia and Herzegovina can be divided into six groups: about an unhappy girl, the death of separated lovers, unhappy newlyweds, unhappy spouses, grieving parents, and various conflicts in the family. The most famous Bosnian and South Slavic ballad is Hasanaginica. Songs about the death of the Morić brothers, about the death of the condemned Ibrahim-beg, and about the death of Hifzi-beg Dumišić also gained wide popularity.

=== Tales and poems of epic heros ===
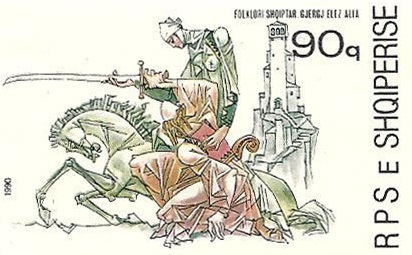
Postage stamp issued by Albanian post-office with the image of Bosnian folk hero, Alija Đerzelez.

One of the most famous Bosnian epic hero is Alija Đerzelez, It has been written more about him and his exploits than about any other hero form Bosnia and Herzegovina. It is said that he slept for centuries only to wake up and come to aid of his homeland in its most difficult moment. He is also depicted as a dragon, a benevolent force in the Bosnian context. The first written record of the epic figure of Đerzelez (in the form of "Ali-beg") was a form of South Slavic bugarštica (long form epic and ballad poem), The Marriage of Vuk the Dragon-Despot, recorded by Đuro Matei at the end of 17th or beginning of 18th century. In songs recorded in the Erlangen Manuscript, Đerzelez is mentioned in the form of "Turk elder Balibeg". Ivo Andrić also featured Alija Đerzelez in his short story Put Alije Đerzeleza (Alija Đerzelez's Journey), which explores the disintegration of the heroic figure in a modern context. The legendary character is believed to have been a popular Muslim epic hero of the Bosnian Krajina (frontier region) as early as the end of 15th century. Of the other heroes of the epic poem in Bosnia and Herzegovina, it is also worth mentioning are the Hrnjica Brothers.

In modern tales of a hero such as Tale the Fool appear, adapted for TV as miniseries Tale (miniseries), based on the novel by Derviš Sušić, (Budalina Tale; Bosnian: budalina = fool) Tale's image contradicts the fairy-tale appearance of the classic epic hero: he also has disheveled clothes and is without special weapons, and is not endowed with any kind of magical properties, while his image is much closer to the image of a simple folk. Tale is a joker and a merry fellow, and can afford to say something that is usually forbidden or not accepted.

Notable researchers and collectors of the Bosnian epic were Alberto Fortis, Friedrich Salomon Krauss, Luka Marjanović and Kosta Hörmann as well as Gerhard Gesemann, Milman Parry, Alois Schmaus, and Đenana Buturović.

=== Oral prose ===
Islam and Islamic literature have had a serious influence on the oral prose of Bosnia and Herzegovina, especially in terms of recognizable themes and motifs. One such example is the famous oriental hero Nasreddin Hodža has firmly taken his place in Bosnian narratives. Bosnian oral prose, however, has not been sufficiently studied, and research in this area is still ongoing. Among the famous collectors and researchers are Nikola Tordinac, Kamilo Blagaić, Vuk Vrčević and Alija Nametak.

== Sevdalinka ==
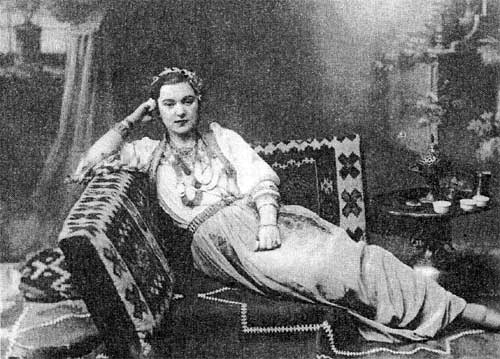
A later staged photograph from the late 19th or early 20th century depicting Umihana Čuvidina, Bosnian poetess of Sevdah, and Bosniak costume and setting.

Sevdalinka is a traditional genre of folk ballad, originating from Bosnia and Herzegovina, since 2024 inscribed into UNESCO Intangible Cultural Heritage Lists. Although, sevdalinka is an integral part of the Bosniak culture, and as such integral part of Bosnia and Herzegovina song-writing and singing, it is also spread and sang across the ex-Yugoslavia region.

The actual composers of many sevdalinka ballads are largely unknown, and they are part of traditional folk poetry, often written during Ottoman period. However, with a beginning of the 19th century authors were becoming increasingly known. The earliest Bosnia and Herzegovina woman author, whose work survives to this day, was Umihana Čuvidina (c. 1794 – c. 1870), a Bosnian Muslim poetess of the Ottoman period. Čuvidina sang her poems and contributed greatly to the traditional genre of Bosniak folk music, sevdalinka.

She wrote about sadness and mourning for her dead lover. The only full poem that can be attributed to Čuvidina without doubt is the 79-verse-long epos called "Sarajlije iđu na vojsku protiv Srbije" (transl. The Men of Sarajevo March to War Against Serbia), which was written in Arebica script.

Aleksa Šantić wrote a number of love songs in the style of these Bosnian love songs, and one of his most well known poem-turned-sevdalinka is Emina, to which music was composed.

== Notable authors and selected works ==
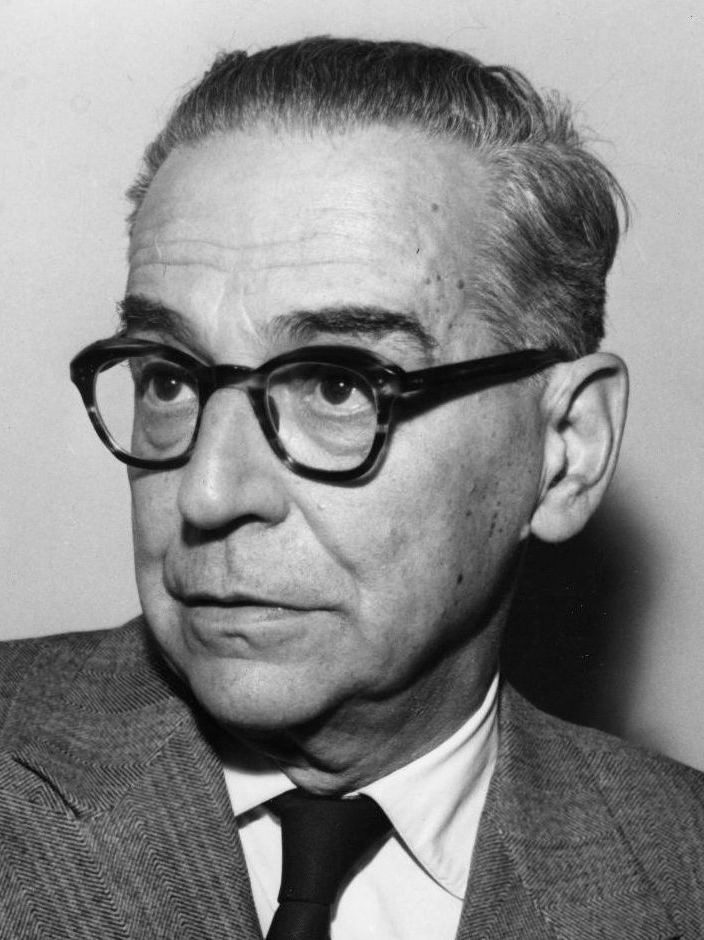
Ivo Andrić

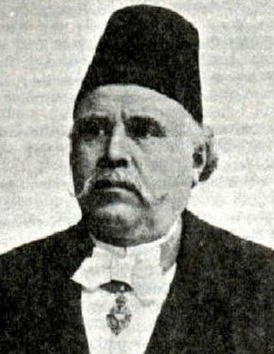

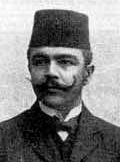

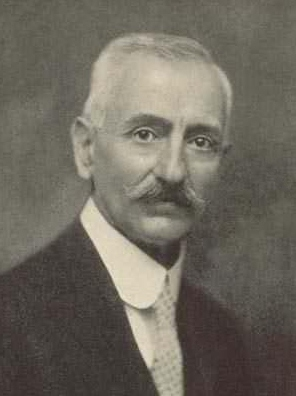
Aleksa Šantić

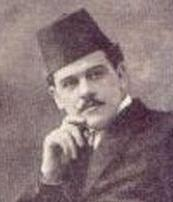
Osman Đikić

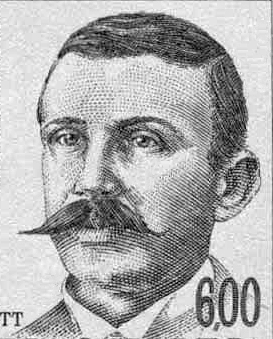

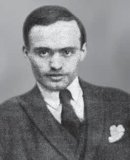
Antun Branko Šimić

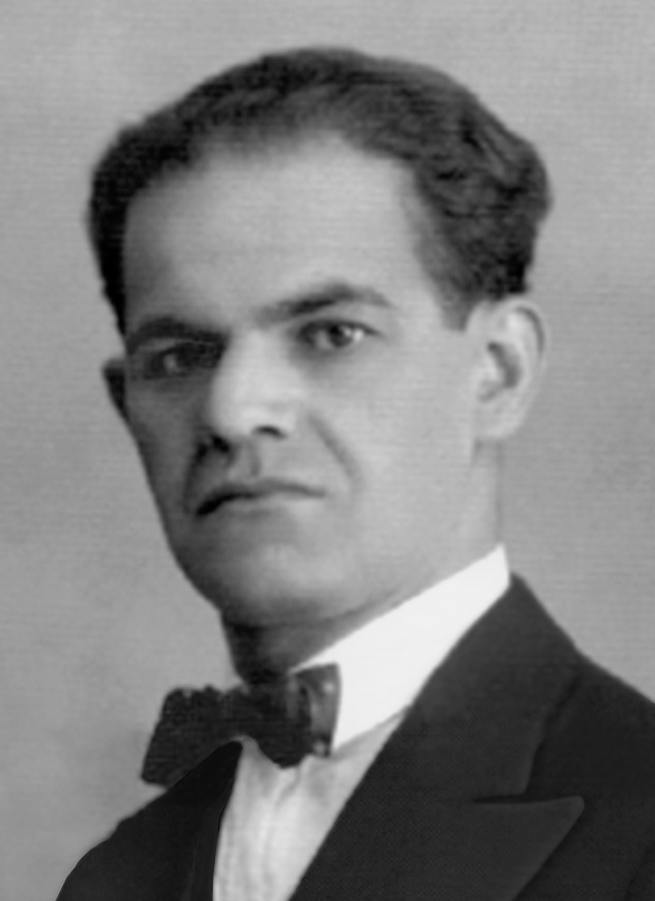
Kalmi Baruh

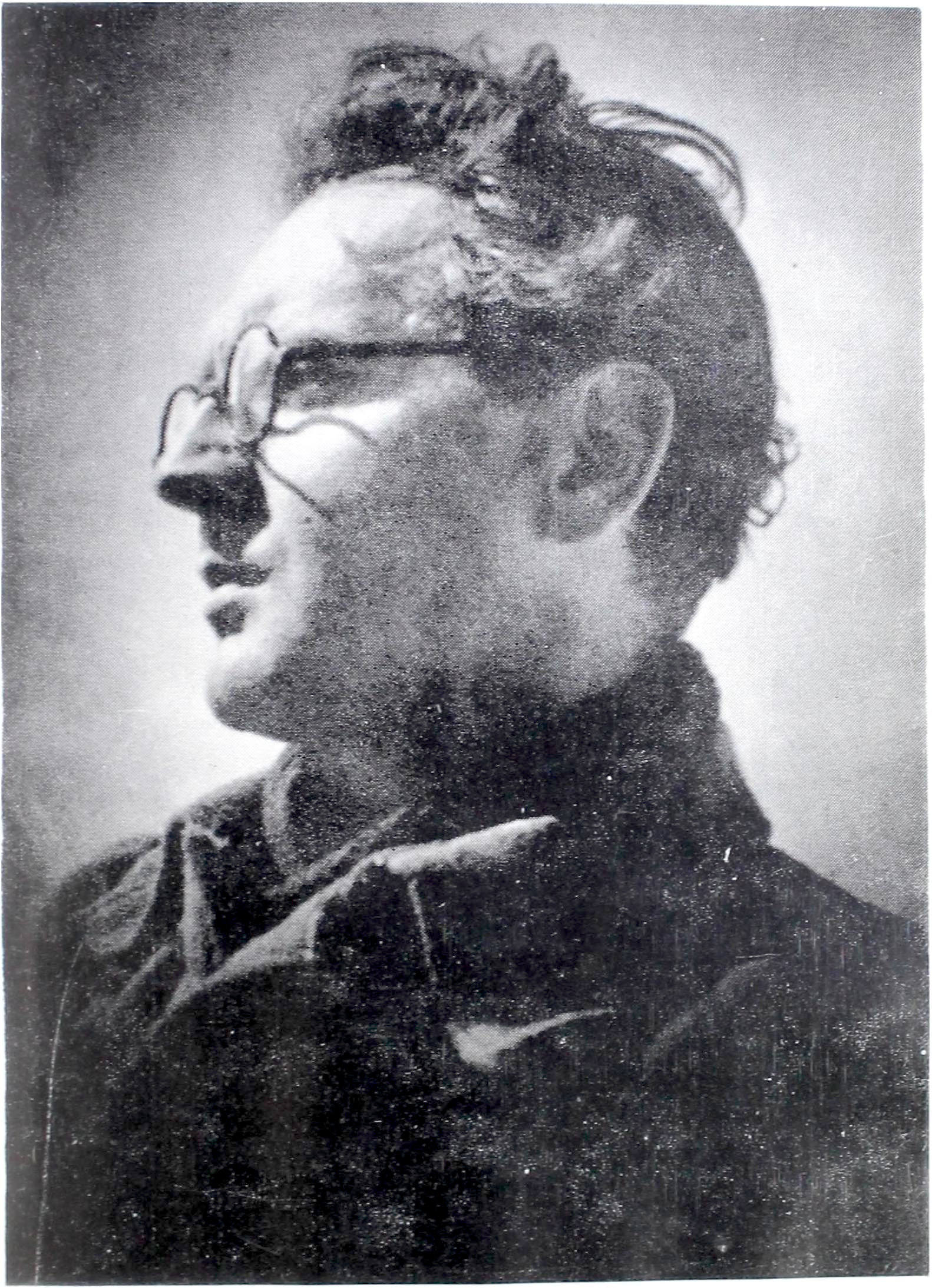

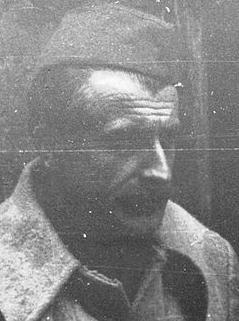

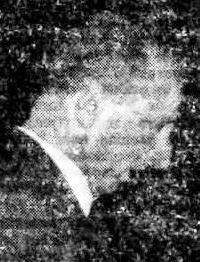

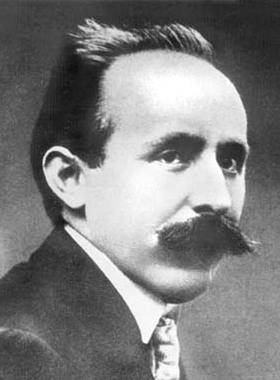
Petar Kočić

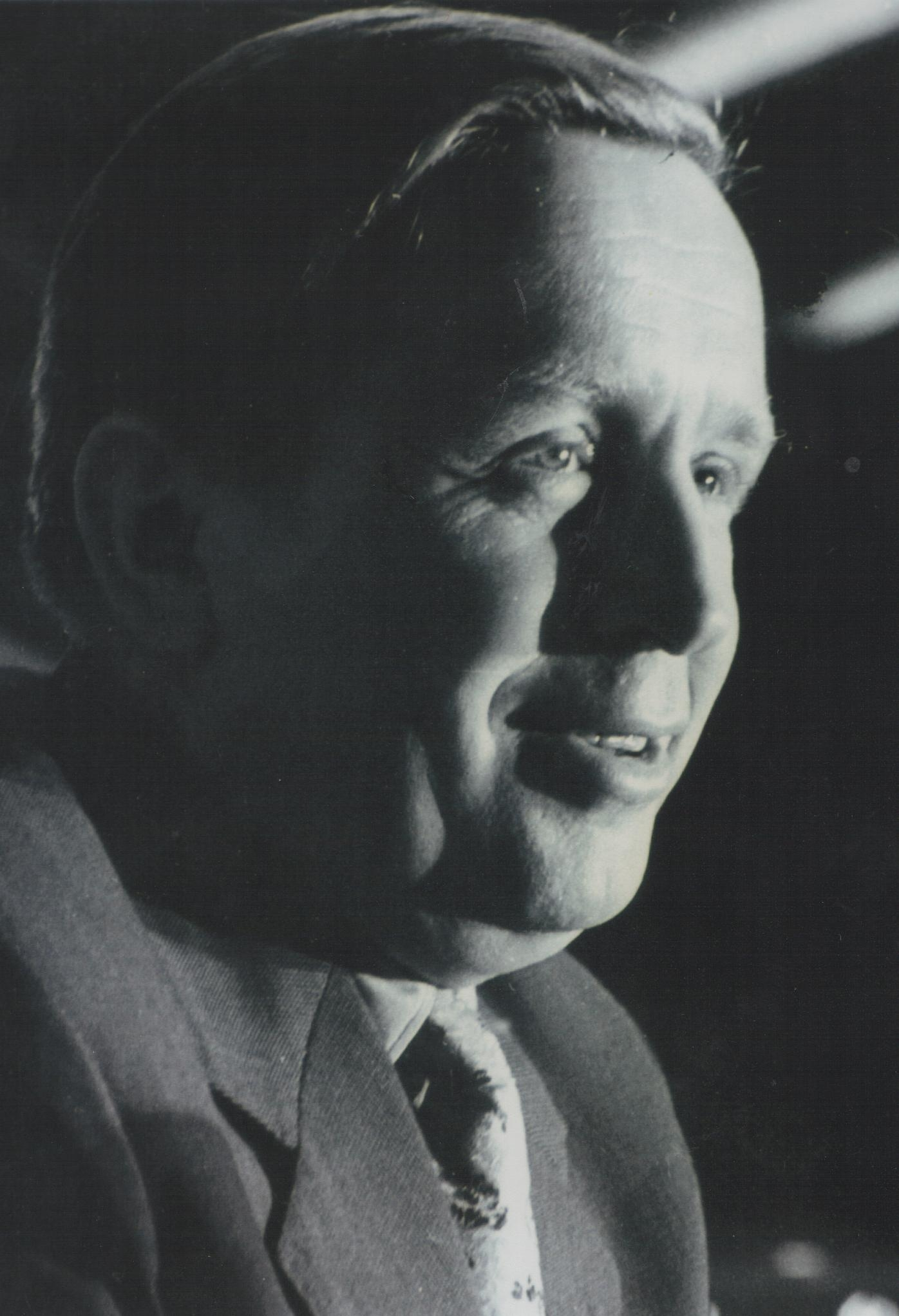
Branko Ćopić

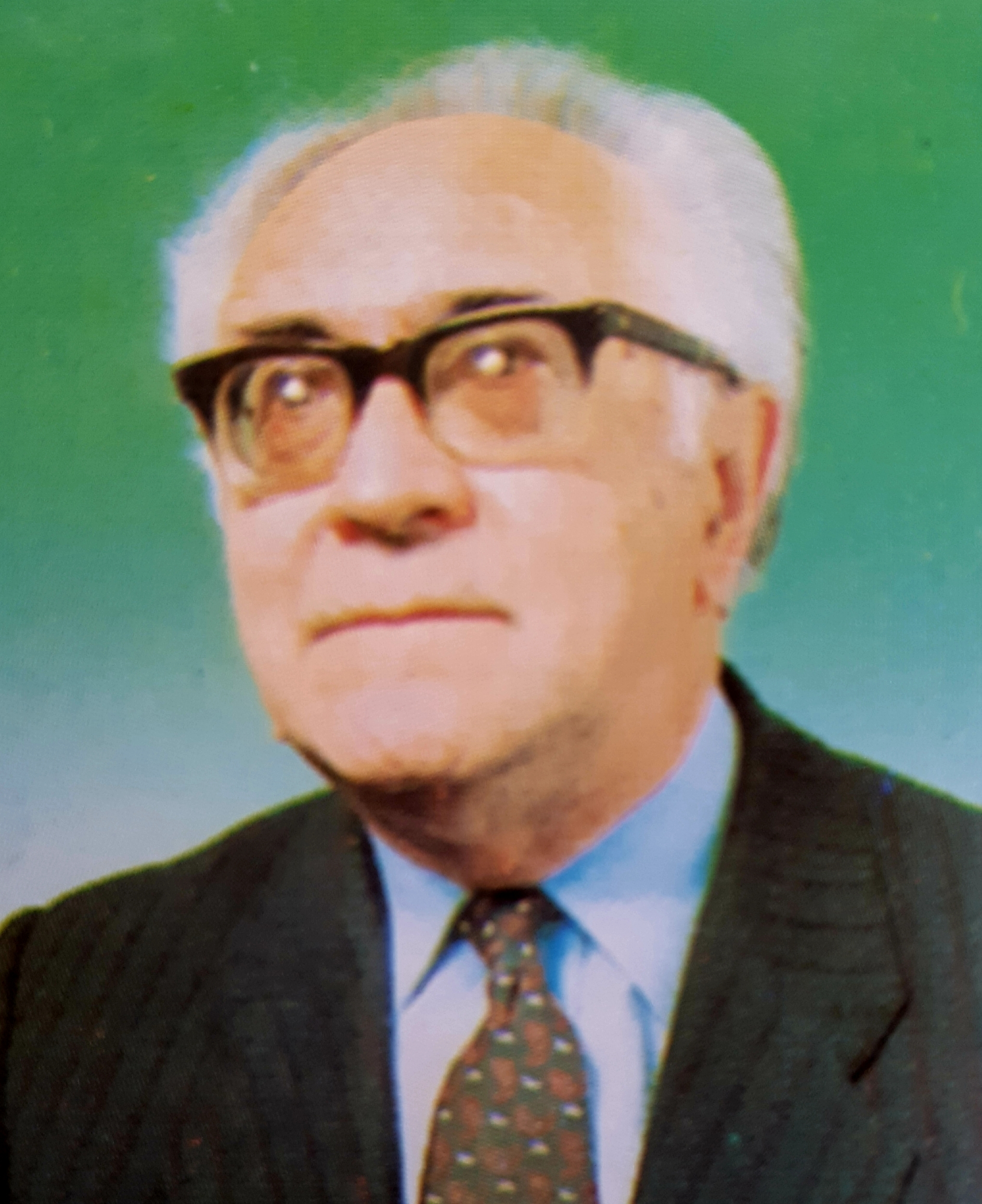
Zaim Topčić

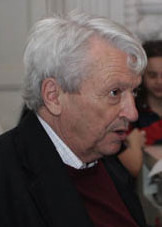
Predrag Matvejević

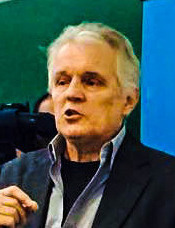
Ivan Lovrenović

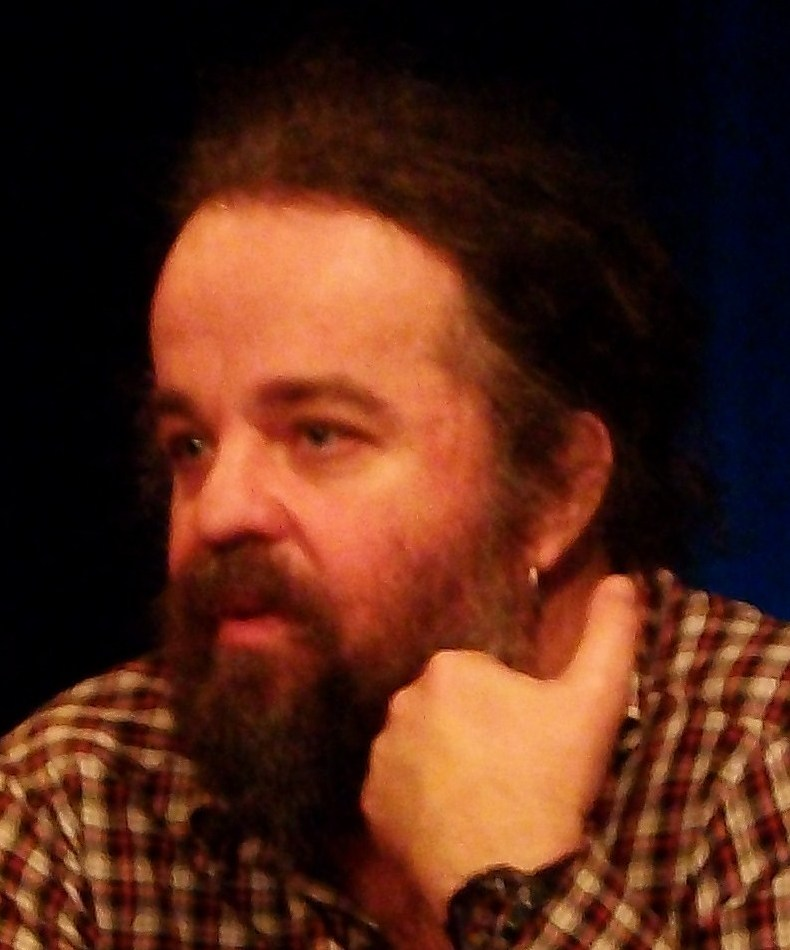
Miljenko Jergović

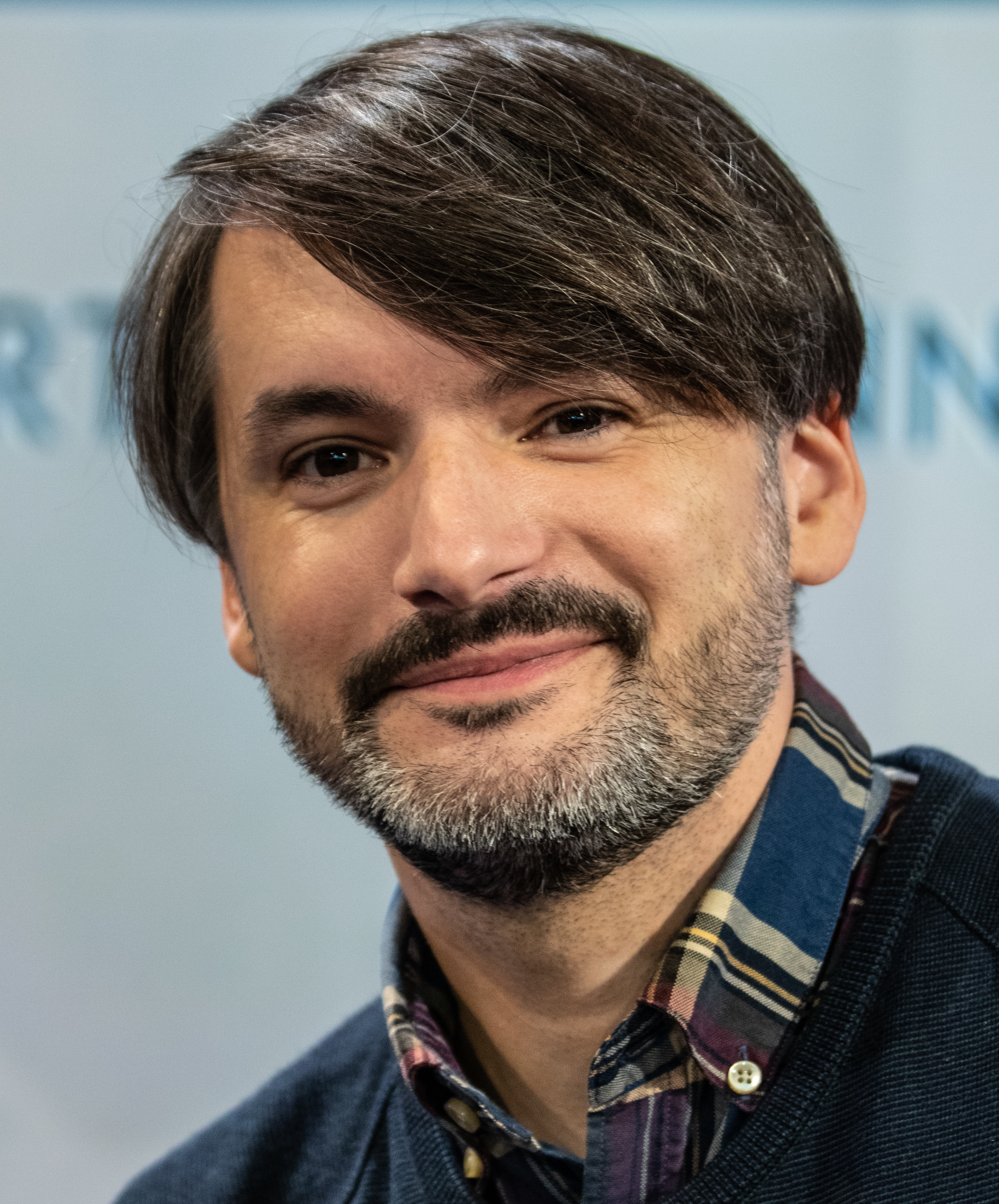
Saša Stanišić

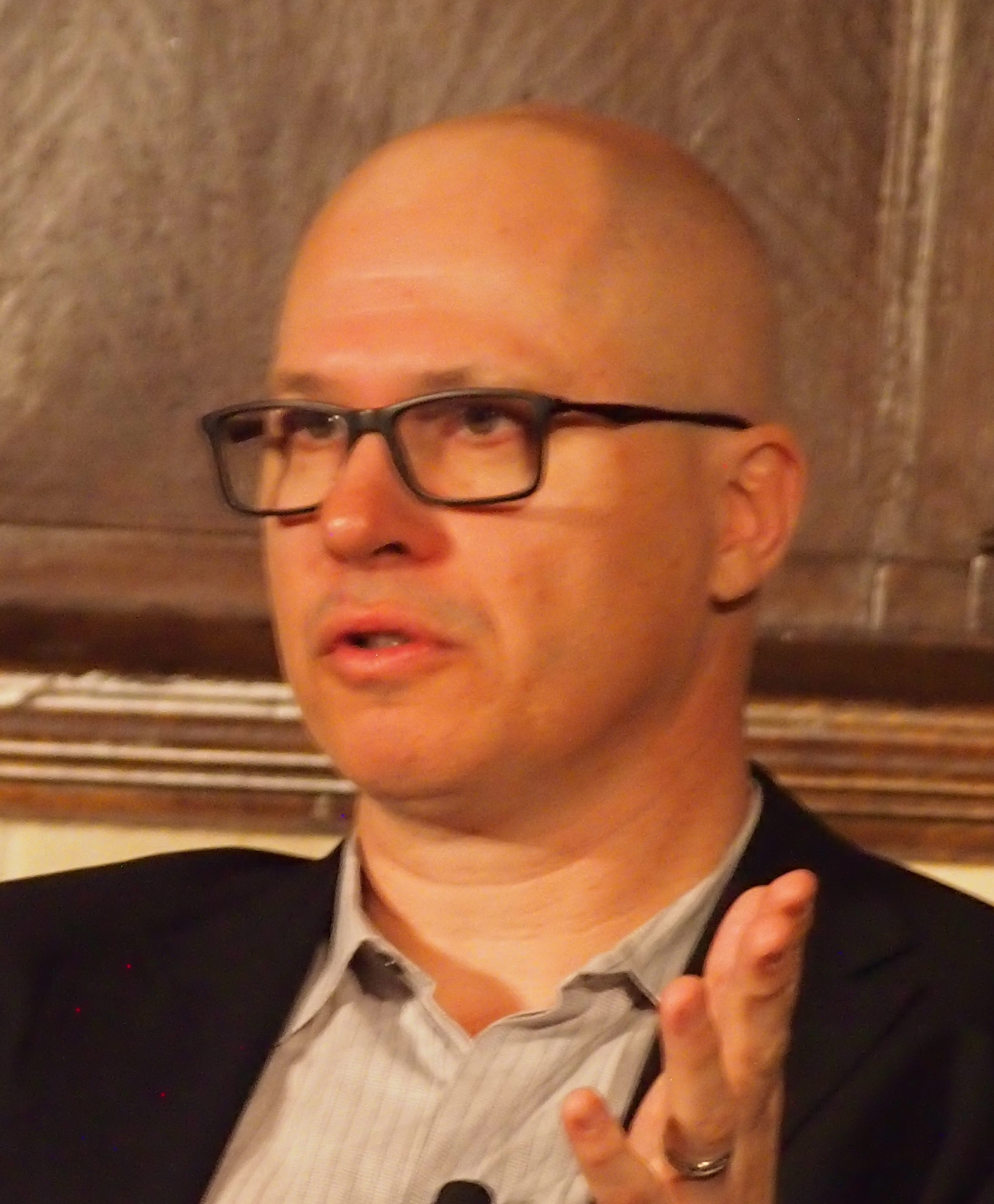
Aleksandar Hemon

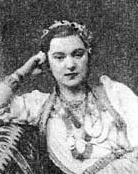

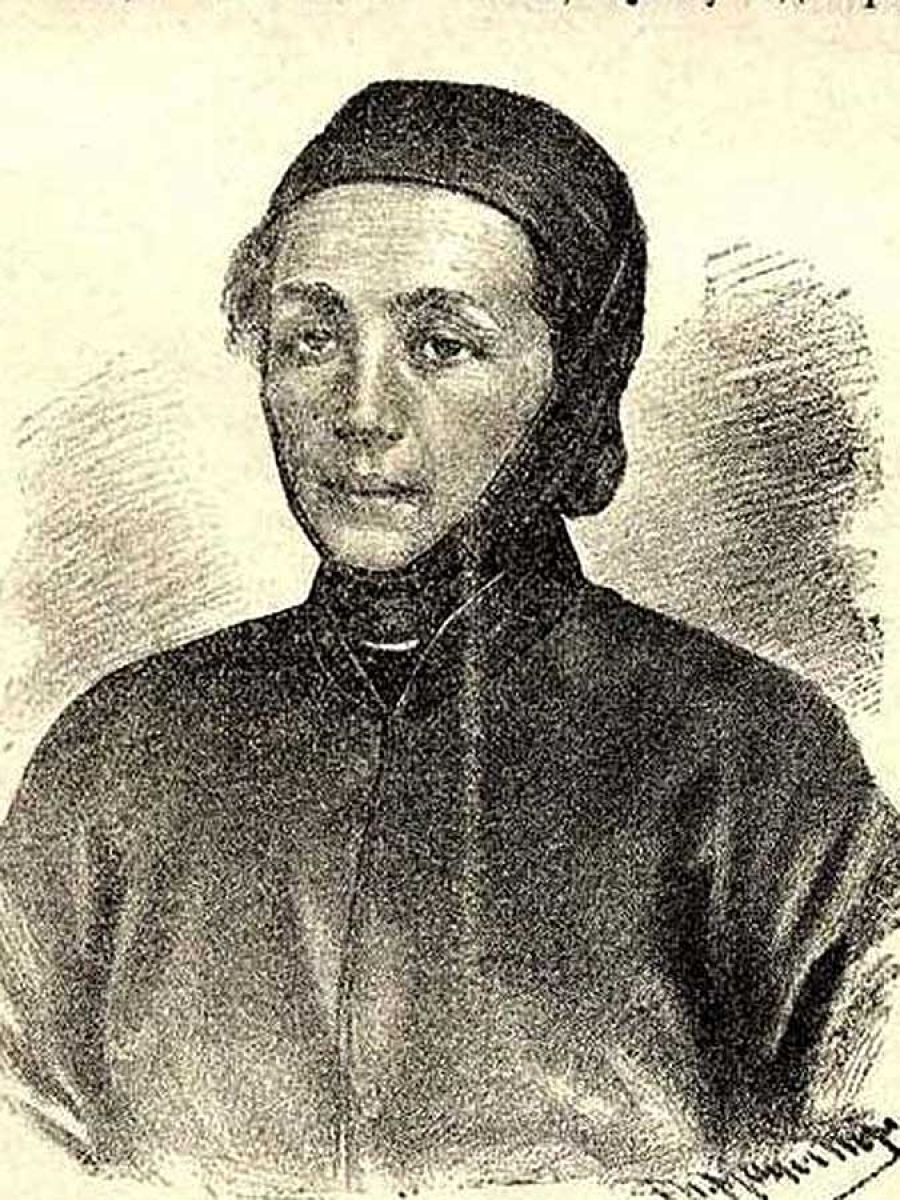

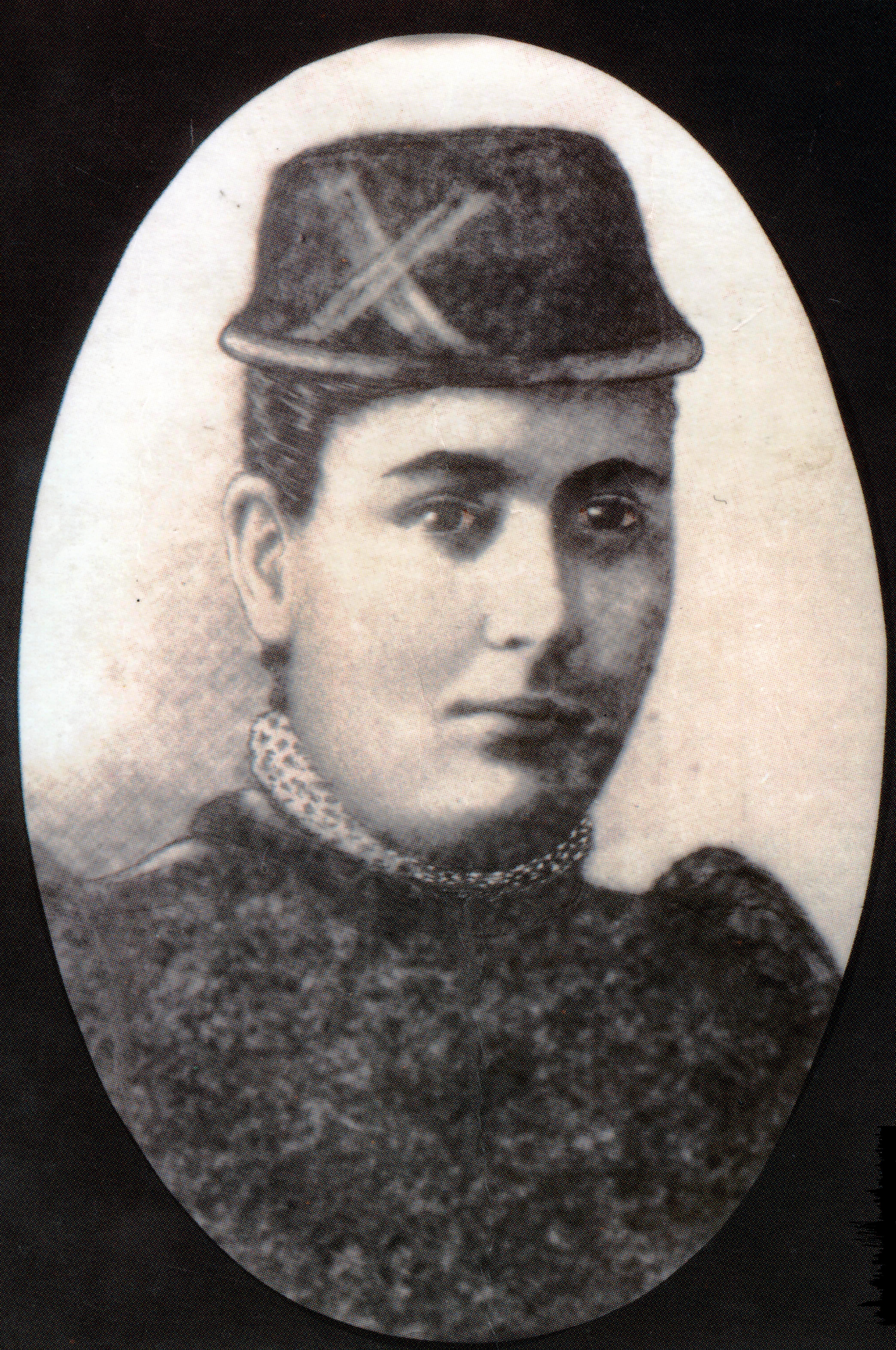

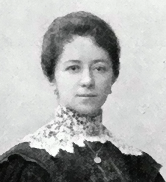

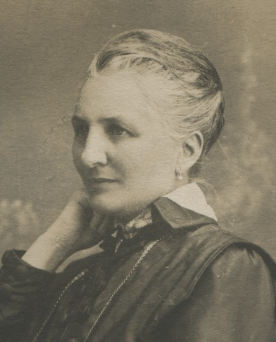

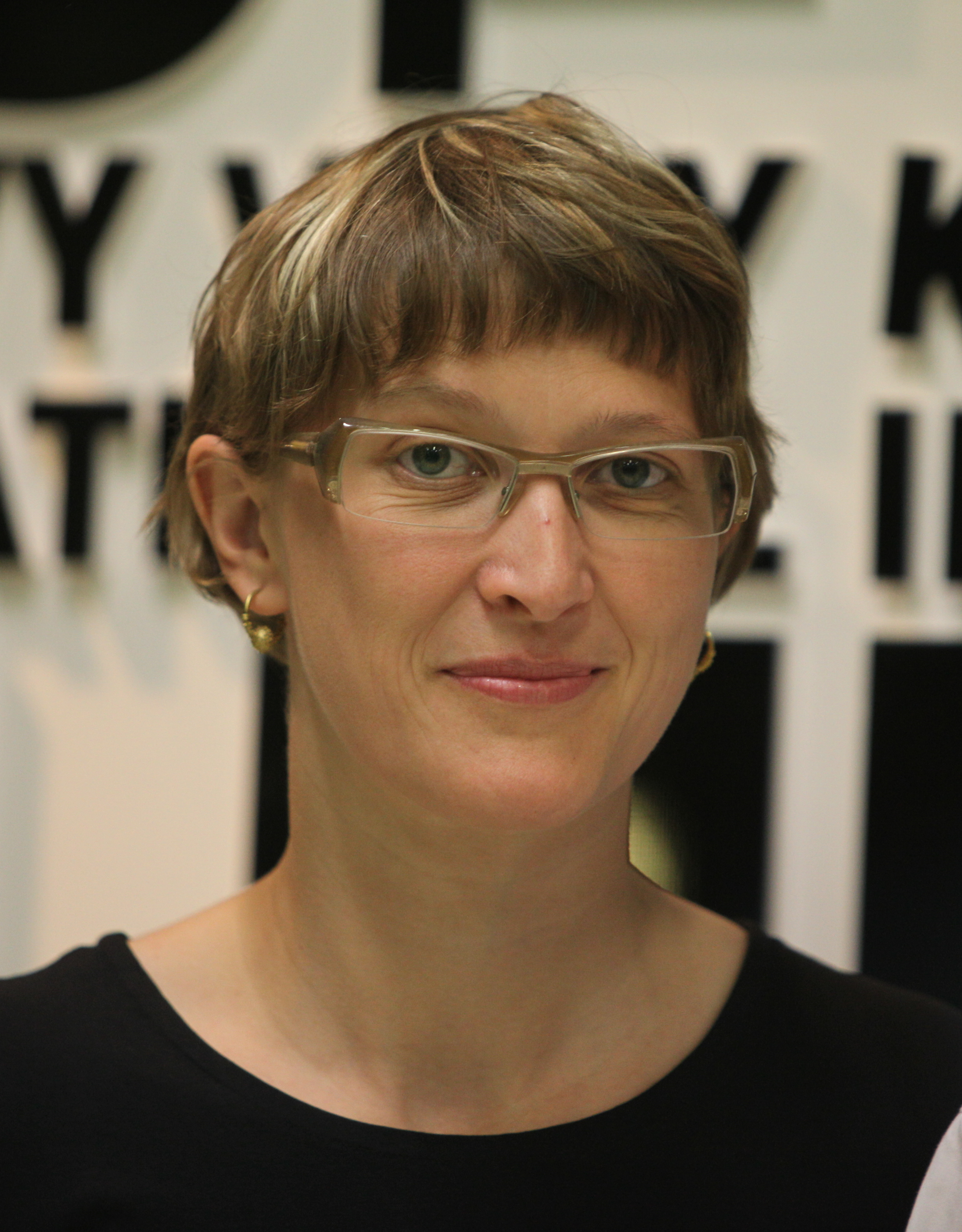

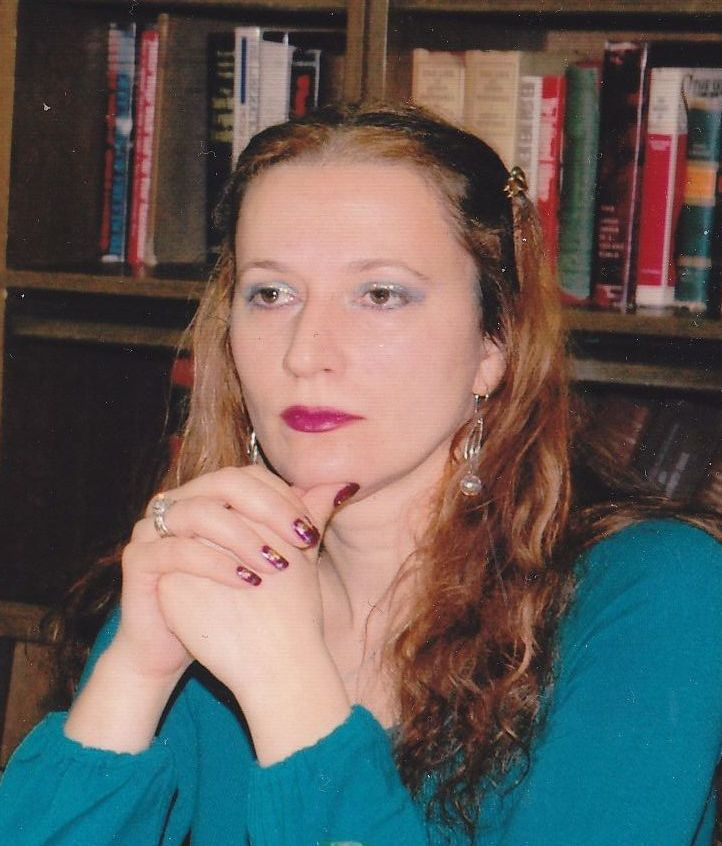

=== Nobel Laureate and notable authors ===
Prominent prose writers include the Nobel laureate Ivo Andrić, Meša Selimović. Notable poets such as Osman Đikić, Izet Sarajlić, Antun Branko Šimić, Aleksa Šantić, Jovan Dučić, Hasan Kikić, Veselin Masleša, Mak Dizdar. Other prominent authors include Mehmed Kapetanović, Safvet-beg Bašagić, Petar Kočić, Skender Kulenović, Enver Čolaković, Kalmi Baruh, Derviš Sušić, Svetozar Ćorović, Zaim Topčić, Zlatko Topčić, Midhat Begić, Rade Uhlik, Alija Isaković, Branko Ćopić, Avdo Humo, Hamza Humo, Isak Samokovlija, Vitomir Lukić, Zuko Džumhur, Duško Trifunović, Abdulah Sidran, Ivan Lovrenović, Predrag Matvejević, and Nedžad Ibrišimović. The new wave of authors include names such as Mehmed Begić, Marko Tomaš, Ivica Đikić, Saša Stanišić, Miljenko Jergović, Semezdin Mehmedinović, Nenad Veličković, Andrej Nikolaidis, Aleksandar Hemon, Muharem Bazdulj, and others. Prominent women writers include Umihana Čuvidina, Staka Skenderova, Laura Papo Bohoreta, Jagoda Truhelka, Nafija Sarajlić, Milena Mrazović, Nasiha Kapidžić-Hadžić, Ljubica Ostojić, Ognjenka Milićević, Bisera Alikadić, Nura Bazdulj-Hubijar, Aleksandra Čvorović, Tanja Stupar-Trifunović, Alma Lazarevska, Jasmila Žbanić, Zlata Filipović, Lejla Kalamujić, Senka Marić, Lana Bastašić, and others.

=== Selected works ===
- Na Drini ćuprija (The Bridge on the Drina), Ivo Andrić,
- Prokleta avlija i druge priče (Damned Yard and Other Stories), Ivo Andrić,
- Derviš i smrt (the Death and the Dervish), Meša Selimović,
- Tvrđava (the Fortress), Meša Selimović, (1970)
- Legenda o Ali-paši (The Legend of Ali Pasha), Enver Čolaković, Zagreb (1944)
- Jauci sa zmijanja, Petar Kočić, Srpska štamparija, Zagreb (1910)
- Sudanija, Petar Kočić, Islamska dioničarska štamparija, Sarajevo (1911)
- Pod maglom, Aleksa Šantić, Belgrade (1907)
- Emina (poem), Aleksa Šantić (1902)
- Na starim ognjištima, Aleksa Šantić, Mostar (1913)
- Pobune, Derviš Sušić, Sarajevo (1946)
- Uhode, Derviš Sušić, Sarajevo (1989)
- Nosač Samuel (Samuel the Porter), Isak Samokovlija (1946)
- Hanka (Hanka), Isak Samokovlija
- Plava Jevrejka (The Blond Jewess), Isak Samokovlija
- Gluvi barut (Silent Gunpowder), Branko Ćopić (1957)
- Ne tuguj, bronzana stražo (Bronze Guards, Don't Mourn), Branko Ćopić (1958)
- Orlovi rano lete (Eagles Fly Early), Branko Ćopić (1957)
- Kameni spavač (Stone Sleeper), Mak Dizdar (1966–71)
- Modra rijeka (Blue River), Mak Dizdar (1971)
- Zašto tone Venecija (Why is Venice Sinking), Abdulah Sidran
- The Question of Bruno, Aleksandar Hemon (2002)
- The Lazarus Project, Aleksandar Hemon (2008)
- Sarajevski Marlboro, Miljenko Jerdović (1994)

== In other media ==
=== Theatre ===
The National Theater was founded in 1919 in Sarajevo and its first director was famous playwright Branislav Nušić.

In 2000, an opera based on Hasanaginica premiered at the National Theatre of Sarajevo and was later released on CD. The libretto was written by Nijaz Alispahić and the composer was Asim Horozić.

=== In film and television ===
Numerous TV films and series were based on the novels and stories by Branko Ćopić, such as, Nikoletina Bursać, TV film (1964), Eagles Fly Early, TV film (1966), Silent Gunpowder, film (1990), Ježeva kućica, animated film (2017). Abdulah Sidran has written screenplays for world renowned award-winning films, such as When Father Was Away on Business and Do You Remember Dolly Bell?, directed by Emir Kusturica, and Kuduz, directed by Ademir Kenović.

In 1967, based on the motifs of a Bosnian folk ballad, Hasanaginica, the feature film of the same name is written and directed by Mića Popović, followed by 1974 Zdravko Velimirović's adaptation of Meša Selimović's novel for the feature film with a same name, Death and the Dervish.
While in the United States, Aleksandar Hemon started working as a screenwriter, and collaborated with Lana Wachowski (the Wachowskis) and David Mitchell on the finale of the TV show Sense8, and The Matrix Resurrections.

Hasanaginica was adapted for the TV film and series by TV Sarajevo, with Nada Đurevska in the title role, Josip Pejaković as Hasan Aga and Miralem Zupčević as Beg Pintorović.

=== Magazines ===
Magazines such as Novi Plamen, Most and Sarajevske sveske are some of the more prominent publications covering cultural and literary themes.

== Literary institutions ==
=== Museum of literature ===
The current Museum of Literature and Theater Arts of Bosnia and Herzegovina was opened, in a way, thanks to Ivo Andrić's wish that the original manuscript of his novel The Bridge on the Drina be kept in Sarajevo. The museum is located in Stari Grad, more precisely Baščaršija neighborhood in the heart of Sarajevo, Sime Milutinovića Sarajlije 7 street. An old family house, built in the middle of the 19th century, which was originally owned by the Skarić family and then by the Despić family, houses the museum. It was Despić's who donated their house to City of Sarajevo (not to be confused with another Despić family house known as Despić House Museum). The museum was founded in 1961 as the Museum of Literature, by the writer Razija Handžić, also the first director of the museum, who decided to take advantage of the fact that Ivo Andrić was awarded the Nobel Prize in Literature and that he donated valuable original manuscript of his novel. A decade later, in 1970, it expanded its activities to theatrical arts. Museum's collection is distributed in 67 literary and 17 theater collections, which contain more than 20,000 items. Among the many valuable exhibits is the most important among them - the original manuscript of the Nobel Prize-winning novel The Bridge on the Drina.

=== PEN Bosnia and Herzegovina ===
PEN Center of Bosnia and Herzegovina (P.E.N. Centar u Bosni i Hercegovini / П.Е.Н. Центар у Босни и Херцеговини) is one of the 148 centers of PEN International. It is based in Sarajevo, Bosnia and Herzegovina. and it was founded in the first year of the war in Bosnia, on 31 October 1992. Being part of Yugoslavia, Bosnia and Herzegovina did not have the right for membership at the International PEN as an independent center. The center serves on the association and for the benefit of its members – writers, journalists, editors, publishers, publicists, literary critics and historians, literary translators, and other intellectuals and authors, representing their interests in cooperation with an authorities and organizations in the country and abroad, with the aim of "affirming and promoting literature, tolerance, culture of dialogue and freedom of expression in accordance with the Charter of the International P.E.N. Organizations".

=== Literary prizes ===
The "Meša Selimović" Award is a literary award for best novel published during the previous year in the region of Bosnia and Herzegovina, Croatia, Montenegro and Serbia. It was established in 2001 and is awarded as a part of the "Cum grano salis literary meeting" in Tuzla, Bosnia and Herzegovina.

The "Skender Kulenović" Award is a literary award given as part of the cultural event "Days of the Giants of Bosanski Petrovac" (Serbo-Croatian: Dani bosanskopetrovačkih velikana), during which numerous events are held in the memory of artists from the region of Bosanski Petrovac, such as Ahmet Hromadžić, Skender Kulenović, Mersad Berber and Jovan Bijelić.

The "Mak Dizdar" Award is an award given by the "Slovo Gorčina" literary event in Stolac for the best first unpublished book of poems. It aims to affirm young poets and encourage their further creativity.

The "Svetozar Ćorović" Award or simply "Ćorović's Award" is a Bosnia and Herzegovina literary award that has been awarded since 1997 at the "Ćorović meeting of writers", held in Bileća annually.

The Annual Award of the Writers' Society of Bosnia and Herzegovina is a literary award that is awarded every year for the best newly published literary work by members of the Writers' Society of Bosnia and Herzegovina.

The "Bosnian Stećak" Award is a literary award, founded by Zlatko Topčić, and has been awarded since 1999 as part of the "Sarajevo Poetry Days". The prize consists of a stećak sculpture, a plaque and a cash sum of 5,000 km.

The "Kočićevo pero" Award (transl. "Kočić's Quill pen") is a Serbian and Bosnian literary award of the Petar Kočić Endowment, Banja Luka and Belgrade. The award is given by the Endowment by the Petar Kočić Endowment or the Ministry of Culture of the Republic of Srpska and Serbia.

== Literary studies ==
At the Faculty of Philosophy in Sarajevo, the Department of Literature of the Peoples of Bosnia and Herzegovina is established in autumn of 1950, first as the Chair of Serbo-Croatian Language and Yugoslav Literature and then as the faculty the same year. Following several renaming, re-organisations and reforms (in 1959, 1971, 1979), this department was renamed the Department of Literature of the Peoples and Nationalities of Yugoslavia, and again with more significant reforms following country's independence, department became the Department of Literature of the Peoples of Bosnia and Herzegovina, adding Bosniak, Croat and Serb literature as separate courses. The curriculum significant changes was reflected in these reforms and renaming. Significant scholarly projects, under the patronage of the Academy of Sciences and Arts of Bosnia and Herzegovina, include : Istorija književnosti Bosne i Hercegovine (transl. History of the Literature of Bosnia and Herzegovina) and Prilozi za istoriju književnosti Bosne i Hercegovine (transl. Contributions to the History of the Literature of Bosnia and Herzegovina). Department was involved in establishment of the Institute for Literature in Sarajevo (at first called the Institute for the Study of Yugoslav Literatures). The Language Institute of the University of Sarajevo is also active. From 1954 to 1958 the department published an academic journal, Pitanja jezika i književnosti (transl. Issues in Language and Literature).

== See also ==
- Oriental Institute in Sarajevo
- Association of Writers of Bosnia and Herzegovina
- Association of Writers of Republika Srpska
- List of archives in Bosnia and Herzegovina
- List of libraries in Bosnia and Herzegovina
  - Gazi Husrev-beg Library
  - National and University Library of Bosnia and Herzegovina
  - National and University Library of the Republika Srpska
  - Vijećnica
- List of Glagolitic manuscripts
- List of Glagolitic printed works

== Sources ==
- Bogićević, Vojislav (1975). Pismenost u Bosni i Hercegovini: od Pojave slovenske pismenosti u IX v. do kraja austrougarske vladavine u Bosni i Hercegovini 1918. godine. Veselin Masleša.
- Čopra, Zerina (2019). Književnost i kultura srednjovjekovne Bosne u istraživačkom i publicističkom djelu Maka Dizdara (pdf) (in Bosnian) (Završni diplomski rad ed.). Sarajevo: ff.unsa.ba.
- Deretić, Jovan (2001). Kratka istorija srpske književnosti. Svetovi.
- Deretić, Jovan (1983). Историја српске књижевности. Нолит.
- Dizdar, Mak (1971). Stari bosanski tekstovi. Svjetlost.
- Hadžijahić, Muhamed (1934), Narodne pjesme o Djerzelez Aliji [Folk songs about Djerzelez Alija] (in Croatian), Sarajevo: Št. O. Šehić, OCLC 444780203
- Kuna, Herta (1974). "Хумачка плоча". Босанскохерцеговачка књижевна хрестоматија: Старија књижевност. Zavod za izdavanje udžbenika. pp. 27–.
- Nosić, Milan (1985). Humačka ploča. 100 godina muzeja na Humcu. Ljubuški. pp. 159–164.
- Vego, Marko (1956). "Humačka ploča" [Humac Tablet]. Glasnik Zemaljskog muzeja. 11. Sarajevo: 41–61.
- Vego, Marko (1962). "Humac". Zbornik srednjovjekovnih natpisa Bosne i Hercegovine. Vol. 1. Sarajevo: Zemaljski muzej. pp. 30–31.
- Vego, Marko (1964). Zbornik srednjovjekovnih natpisa Bosne i Hercegovine. Vol. Knjiga III. Sarajevo.
- Vrana, Josip (1966), "Da li je sačuvan original isprave Kulina bana, Paleografijsko-jezična studija o primjercima isprave iz g. 1189." [Has the original of the Charter of Ban Kulin been preserved? A Paleographic-linguistic study of the copies of the monument from the year 1189.], Radovi Staroslavenskog instituta (in Croatian), 2, Old Church Slavonic Institute: 5–57
- Suarez, S.J., Michael F.; Woudhuysen, H.R. (2013). "The History of the Book in the Balkans". The Book: A Global History. Oxford University Press. pp. 506–07. ISBN 978-0-19-967941-6.
- "The Charter of Kulin Ban, 1189" (PDF).
- Fejzić, Fahira. "Povelja Kulina bana–međunarodna zakletva, diplomatsko-trgovinski ugovor i svjedok vremena." Godišnjak Bošnjačke zajednice kulture» Preporod « 1 (2009): 143-148.
- Sivrić, Ivan. "Povelja Kulina bana Dubrovniku." Suvremena pitanja 6 (2008): 174–177.
- Jalimam, Salih. "O latinskom tekstu u Povelji bana Kulina." Istrazivanja: Casopis Fakulteta Humanistickih Nauka 11 (2016).
- Peco, Asim. "Povelja Kulina bana u svjetlosti štokavskih govora XII i XIII vijeka–u." Osamsto godina Povelje bosanskog bana Kulina, 1189-1989 (1989).
- Vukomanović, S. "Leksika i gramatička značenja u Povelji Kulina bana, u: Osamsto godina Povelje bosanskog bana Kulina 1189–1989." Posebna izdanja ANUBiH, knj 23 (1989): 77–97.
- Karavdić, Zenaida. "O Povelji Kulina bana–“Bez’v’sega z’loga primysla”."
