= Mustafa Ejubović =

Bosnian scholar

- Born: 1651; Mostar, Bosnia Eyalet, Ottoman Empire
- Died: 16 July 1707 (aged 56); Mostar, Bosnia Eyalet, Ottoman Empire
- Occupation: Historian

Mustafa Ejubović (1651 – 16 July 1707), also known as Šejh Jujo, was a Bosnian Hanafi philosopher, historian, writer and Mufti of Ottoman Bosnia and Herzegovina.

== Biography ==
Mustafa Ejubović was born in a Bosnian family in the Herzegovinian town of Mostar in 1651. His father Jusuf Ejubović was a distinguished professor. Young Mustafa taught maktab and madrasa in Mostar before departing for Constantinople to study in 1677. There he listened to lectures on philosophy, astronomy and mathematics. When he graduated, he got a professorship at a lower madrasa in Constantinople, became famous for his lectures, and soon began to teach. Ejubović wrote 27 treatises on logic during his lifetime. IHe contributed to Bosnian literature on his native Bosnian language, but he was also fluent in Arabic, Turkish and Persian.

Upon his return to Bosnia, Ejubović became the Mufti of Mostar in 1692. He died on 16 July 1707 in his hometown.
