= Ivaniš Dragišić Hrvatinić =

15th century Bosnian nobleman

Ivaniš Dragišić (died before August 22, 1446) was a vojvoda from the Hrvatinić family. He had estates in the župas of Sana, Banjica and Glaž in the zemlja of Donji Kraji.

== Biography ==
Ivaniš was the son of Dragiša Hrvatinić, one of the four sons of Vukac Hrvatinić. His uncle was Duke Hrvoje Vukčić Hrvatinić. Vukac also had sons Vuk and Vojislav. Dragiša appears in historical sources for the last time in 1401. Ivaniš Dragišić is mentioned as one of the witnesses in the charter of Juraj Vojsalić, son of Vojislav Vukčić Hrvatinić, dated August 12, 1434. With this charter, Juraj confirmed to the Radivojevićs all the territories they held and placed them under the protection of Fra Juan. Juraj was Ivanish's uncle's brother. Ivaniš's sons held: Ključ with the Banjica župa, the town of Glaž with the Glaž župa, the town of Mrin and Kijevac in the Sana župa, a village that belonged to the town of Gradiška and two villages in the Uskoplje župa. It is assumed that these territories were gathered by Ivaniš, and that his sons inherited them as an indivisible inheritance. Ivaniš Dragišić was certainly faithful to the Catholic Church. This is shown by the Christian names of his sons (Pavle, Marko, Juraj/Đurađ), as well as the fact that there was a Catholic church of St. Nicholas in Glaž.

Duke Ivaniš died before August 22, 1446. Then the Bosnian king Stjepan Tomaš confirmed to Ivaniš's sons, Pavle, Marko and Juraj, the fortress of Ključ with 60 villages in the župas of Mrin, Banjica, Glaž and Uskoplje.

== Family tree ==
Stjepan (Prince of Donji Kraj)
Hrvatin Stjepanić
Vukac Hrvatinić
Dragiša Vukčić Hrvatinić
Ivaniš Dragišić

== Bibliography ==
- Мргић, Јелена (2002). Доњи Краји: Крајина средњовековне Босне. Београд: Филозофски факултет.
- Мргић, Јелена (2008). Северна Босна: 13-16. век. Београд: Историјски институт.
- Хрватски биографски лексикон, Hrvatin Stjepanić
