= Hrvatin Stjepanić =

13th and 14th century Bosnian nobleman and magnate

Hrvatin Stjepanić (Latin: Horvatinus, Huruatin; fl. 1299–1304), was a Bosnian magnate with the title of Knez of Donji Kraji in Bosnia (de inferioribus Bosne confinibus). In historiography, Hrvatin's surname is spelled Stjepanić or Stipanić. Hrvatin is a namesake for the Hrvatinić noble family.

== Life ==
Hrvatin Stjepanić was a Bosnian magnate, who ruled in Donji Kraji, in medieval Bosnia with the title of knez de inferioribus Bosne confinibus (lit. 'of the borderlands of lower Bosnia'). He was a relative and vassal of Paul I Šubić of Bribir, a Ban of Bosnia at the time. Medievalist Ferdo Šišić believed that Hrvatin died around the same time as Paul I in 1312. He had three sons. Hrvatin is a namesake for the Hrvatinić noble family, made prominent in the Banate of Bosnia and later Kingdom of Bosnia by his son, Vukac Hrvatinić, at first as a knez and later vojvoda (transl. duke), and even more so by his grandson, the Grand Duke of Bosnia, Hrvoje Vukčić Hrvatinić.

== Issue ==
Hrvatin had three sons:

- Vukoslav Hrvatinić (Latin: Vlkosslaus; fl. 1315–1326), issued a charter in 1315 in Sanica. In a c. 1326 land grant, Stephen II mentioned that Vukoslav "had left the Croatian lord" (that is, had ceased alliance with Paul I's heir, Mladen II Šubić of Bribir, and Croatian nobility more generally, so is now considered loyal to Stephen). Vukoslav served as Knez of Ključ (c. 1325). He married Jelena, the daughter of Knez Kurjak.
- Pavao Hrvatinić (fl. 1323–1332)
- Vukac Hrvatinić (fl. 1357–1366, died after 1377), defended c. 1363 the Sokol Fortress in the Pliva county against the Hungarians, for which he was awarded an entire župa Pliva and a title of vojvoda (transl. duke) by Ban Tvrtko I.
