= Donji Kraji =

Medieval region of Bosnia and Herzegovina

Donji Kraji Bosne Donji Kraji
- Zemlja of Bosnian Banate then Kingdom
- earliest mention 1230–1463
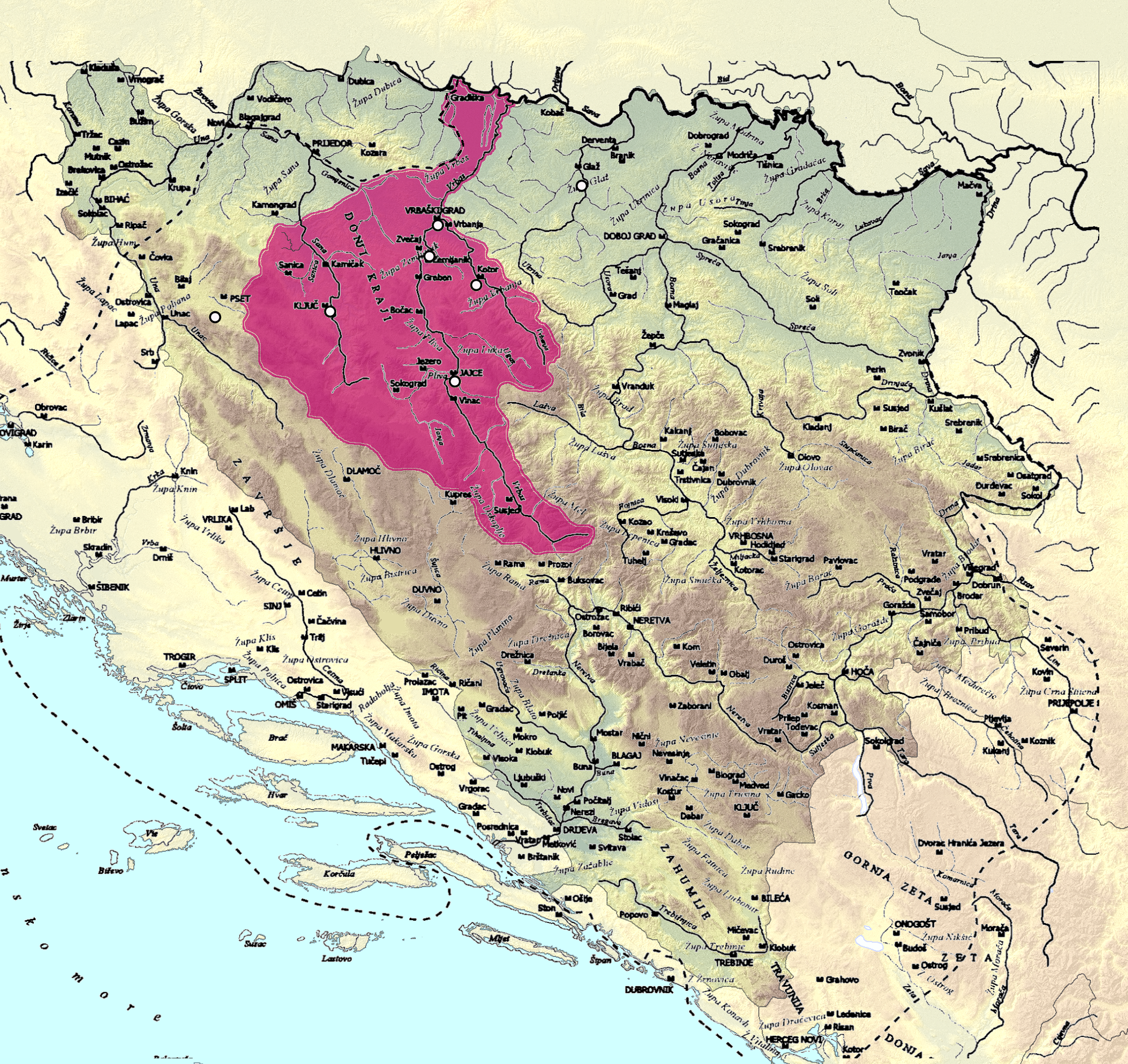
- Donji Kraji, zemlja of medieval Bosnian state (shown within modern borders) per Mrgić-Radojčić seminal work (2002)
- Capital: Kotor, Jajce, Ključ
- Area
  - Coordinates: 44.341667°N 17.269444°E
- Status: Zemlja
- Government
  - Type: Feudal
  - HQ: Kotor; Jajce
- Knez
  - 1299–1304: Hrvatin Stjepanić
  - 1350–1378: Vukac Hrvatinić
  - 1380–1388: Hrvoje Vukčić Hrvatinić
- Legislature
  - noble family: Hrvatinić
  - cadet branch: Vukčić
- Historical era: Medieval Bosnia
  - Established: earliest mention 1230
  - Disestablished: 1463
- Contained within
  - Banate: Banate of Bosnia
  - Kingdom: Kingdom of Bosnia
- Subdivisions
  - Type: Župas
  - Units: Pliva, Glaž, Sana, Uskoplje, Luka, Vrbas, Zemljanik (Resnik), Vrbanja, Tribava (Trijebovo), Mel, Lušci and Banjica, and on occasions Dubica
Succeeded by
Banate of Jajce; Sanjak of Bosnia
- Today part of: Bosnia and Herzegovina

Donji Kraji or Donji Krajevi (Lower Regions or Lower Ends, Latin: Partes inferiores, Hungarian: Alföld), was a small medieval zemlja of medieval Bosnian state. Its territory was mostly laid within the boundaries of today's Bosanska Krajina in northwestern Bosnia and Herzegovina.

== Name and geography ==
Medieval Bosnian State Expansion

At first, Donji Kraji referred to a region around Ključ on the Sana. Marko Vego derives the name of Donji Kraji from the name of Roman province Lower Pannonia, or later Lower Slavonia, while Pavao Anđelić deduces that the name Donji Kraji (Lower Ends) "also has a certain relation to the rest of (highland) Bosnia", where the terms "Lower" and "End" refers to a border area that is below from the geographical point of view, and in terms of altitude and terrain configuration, in relation to the rest of Bosnia. Jelena Mrgić reject existence of "Donji Kraji Slavonije" altogether, and reject previous etymological discussions among historians, such as Klajić, Jiriček and even Vego, and derives the name, similarly to Pavao Anđelić, from geography (altitude and topography) and political demarcation as a product of solely local Bosnian origin. From the 13th century, texts referring to it as "Donji kraji Bosne" or "Donji kraji Bosanski, or "Donji kraji bosanske zemlje". During the reign of Hrvatinić family, since the beginning of 13th century, the territory of Donji Kraji included areas and župas around Sana river, Glaž, to Grmeč mountain on the west and to the middle course of the Vrbas river on the east, thus covering entire region of Sanica, and later included Uskoplje, Pliva, Luka, Vrbas, Zemljanik (Resnik), Vrbanja, Tribava (Trijebovo), Mel, Lušci and Banjica, and on occasions Dubica and sometimes even Usora. Vjekoslav Klaić by invoking primary sources and document from 1244, as well as Mrgić, placed the territory of Donji Kraji in northern Bosnia, west from zemlja Usora. This is confirmed by Konstantin Josef Jireček who said: "The Lower Ends (das Unterland) lies in the northwestern (Bosnia) toward Croatia, encompassing Kotor on the Vrbanja, Jajce and Ključ on the Sana [above modern town of Ključ] (Kotor ander Vrbanja, Jajce, Ključ an der Sana u. S. W.)". From the Bosnian Cyrillic scripts of the written monuments, we know that Lušci village was in the Donji Kraji but this place is not known today.

== History ==
=== Early history ===
In the 2nd half of the 12th century, the Banate of Bosnia, governed by Ban Borić, a Hungarian vassal, was confined to the regions of central Bosnia. By 1167, the Banate of Bosnia and parts of the Croatian Kingdom were captured by the Byzantine Empire, including the Croatian-Hungarian župas of Pliva, Luka, and Vrbanja, where the zemlja of Donji Kraji would later develop. With the death of Emperor Manuel I Komnenos in 1180, the Byzantines lost the acquired lands. The area of Donji Kraji was granted to Bosnian Ban Kulin by King Bela III for his assistance in the wars with the Byzantines. Kulin's influence was restricted to the centre of his banate, as the regions to which he expanded have retained de facto independence.

The first indirect mention of Donji Kraji was in 1230, when Ban Matej Ninoslav granted the right of tithe collection to the Bishop of Bosnia. That was mentioned in a bull (decree) by King Bela IV of Hungary dated 20 July 1244, where he emphasized that it was previously granted by Matej Ninoslav. Later, other rulers such as Ban Prijezda had estates in these lands. Prijezda granted the Zemljanik župa to his son-in-law and the oldest son of Slavonian Ban Stephen Babonić in 1287. At the end of the 13th century, the Babonić family also had the Vrbanja župa in Donji Kraji in their possession. It is not known when they obtained this župa.

Following the death of King Ladislaus IV in 1290, a war of succession broke out between the Árpád dynasty, supported by most of the Hungarian nobles, and the House of Anjou, with the support of most of the Croatian nobility. During the succession crisis, Croatian Ban Paul I Šubić greatly expanded his holdings, including the Banate of Bosnia in 1299, where he replaced Stephen I as Lord of Bosnia. The local Hrvatinić family of Donji Kraji submitted to Paul I Šubić. The eponymous founder of the Hrvatinić clan, Hrvatin Stjepanić who was also a blood relative of the Šubić family, held the title of "Knez of Donji Kraji Bosanske zemlje" (transl. Count of the Lower Ends of Bosnian country). The title was mentioned in a charter from 1299, issued by King Charles II of Naples of the Capetian of Anjou family to the Hrvatinić and Šubić families, in which he named Hrvatin Stjepanić and his brothers as feudal owners of Donji Kraji. In order to secure Hrvatin's loyalty, Paul I Šubić issued a charter in 1301 in which he committed to protect Hrvatin and his holdings. Hrvatin was referred to in the charter as the "Knez of Donji Kraji of Bosnia" (transl. Count of the Lower Ends of Bosnia) (de inferioribus Bosne confinibus). Paul I Šubić appointed his brother, Mladen I Šubić, as Ban of Bosnia in 1302. However, Hrvatin Stjepanić and Mladen I Šubić were finding themselves constantly quarreling over Hrvatin's holdings in Donji Kraji and other affairs. In 1304, Paul I Šubić had to intervene and sided with Hrvatin, so the Šubić family gave additional assurances to Hrvatin for his possessions in Donji Kraji –at the time, Hrvatin held the Lušci and Banjica župas there.

=== 14th century ===
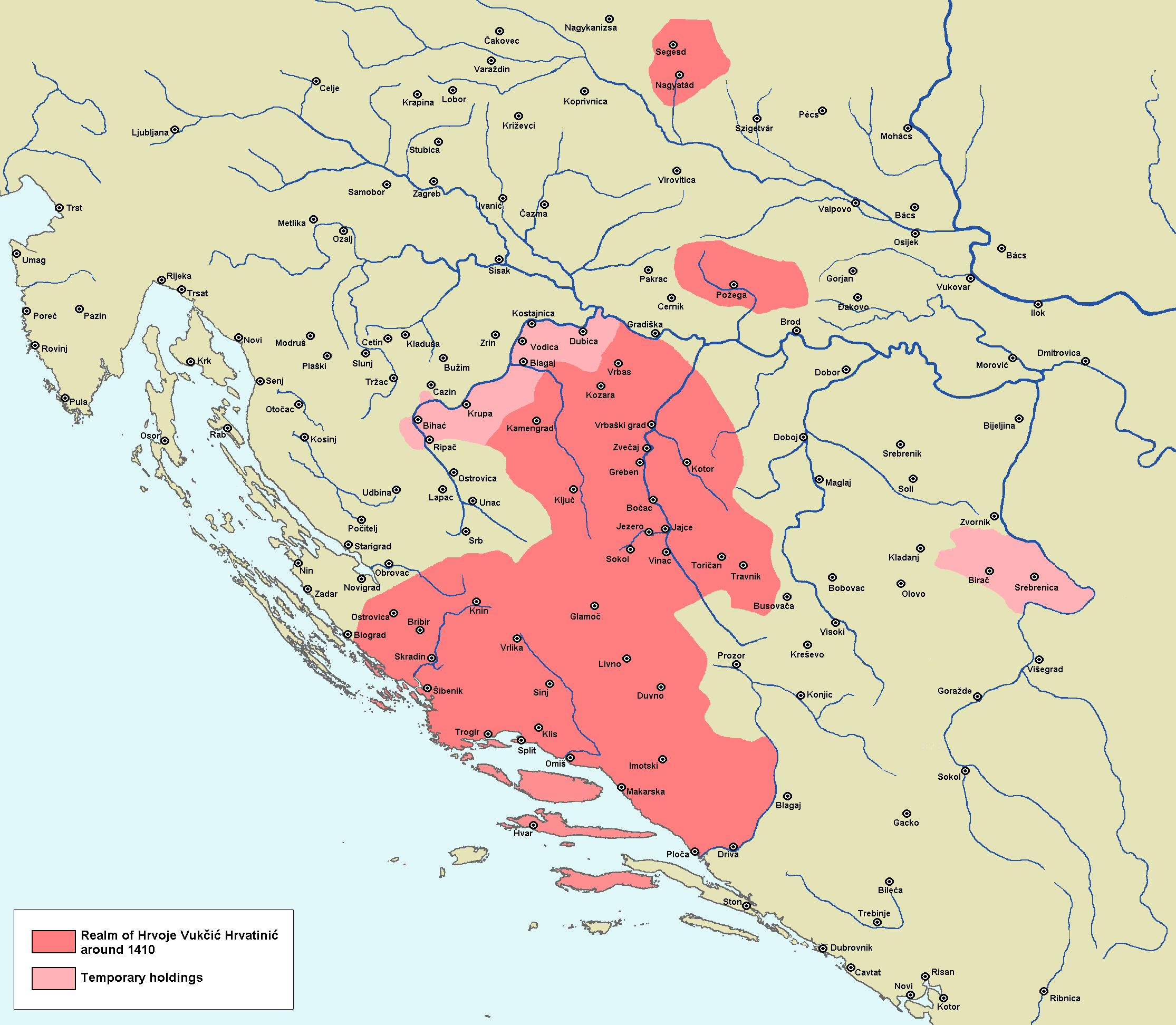
Realm of Hrvoje Vukčić Hrvatinić in the early 15th century

Knez Hrvatin died sometime before 1315, and was succeeded by his sons Vukoslav, Pavao, and Vukac. Hrvatin's sons sided with the Croatian nobles who revolted against Mladen II Šubić, who in 1312 also succeeded his father Paul I as the Ban of Bosnia since 1304. The revolt ended with Mladen's defeat at the Battle of Bliska in 1322 at the hand of Slavonian Ban John Babonić. From that point John Babonić took-over as a new Ban of Croatia, whereas in Bosnia Stephen II Kotromanić, a formerly Šubić's vassal, restored Kotromanić dynasty as the lords of medieval Bosnian state.

Stephen II was the Bosnian Ban from 1314, but in reality from 1322 to 1353 together with his brother, Vladislav Kotromanić in 1326–1353. Since the 2nd half of 1322, Stephen II regained control over Donji Kraji, and called himself "lord of all Bosnian lands, Soli, Usora, Donji Kraji, and Hum". After 1322 and before 1325, the Hrvatinići recognized the authority of Stephen II. As a result of that, around 1326, Stephen II granted Vukoslav Hrvatinić the župas of Vrbanja with the town of Ključ, which was until 1322 owned by the Babonići, and Banjica with the town of Kotor. The local nobles of the Banjica and Vrbanja župas previously sided with Mladen II and did not want to accept Stephen II as Ban. Thus, the charter confirmed Vukoslav his ancestral župas, and in the following years, the Hrvatinići gained control over almost the entire territory of Donji Kraji. During the short period between death of Ban Stjepan II and ascension of new ban in Tvrtko I, the zemlja handled affairs more or less autonomously for a few years, although still nominally a part of the Banate of Bosnia.

In the coming years, Ban Stephen granted Hrvatinić brothers several župas in Donji Kraji, but they were never lords of the whole Donji Kraji zemlja, instead, in the example of Vukoslav, who called himself as "Knez of Ključ", they were regional lords overseeing parts of the zemlja granted to each of them. Third Hrvatin son, Vukac, ruled the župa of Vrbanje. This trend of granting the brothers župas and towns continued in the last charter of Ban Stephen II in 1351, which confirms to Paul and Vuk, heirs of Knez Vukoslav, the inherited estates. The town of Ključ was attributed to his third son, Vlatko Vukoslavić. In addition to Vukoslavić, Pavlović (sons of Knez Paul) and Vlatko Vukoslavić also later claimed their rights over župa Banjica. Vukac Hrvatinić was granted župa Luka by a new Bosnian ban Tvrtko I in a charter issued in 11 August 1366 for his loyalty during battles he waged against Hungarian king Louis I.

=== Donji Kraji under Hrvoje Vukčić ===
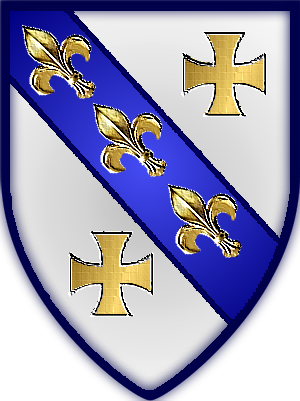
Coat of Arms of Hrvatinić

After Vukac supported Tvrtko I against Hungary, they quickly came up through the ranks in Bosnia, while their most prominent member, Hrvoje Vukčić, along with major new possessions in Donji Kraji and Tropolje was awarded with the title Grand Duke of Bosnia. Hrvoje was the eldest son of Duke Vukac Hrvatinić. He was married to Jelena Nelipčić, granddaughter of the powerful Croatian noble Ivan I Nelipac (Prince Nelipić) and sister of Ivan III Nelipac (Ivaniš Nelipić). He is first mentioned in 1376 as being knez and knight during the reign of Hungarian king Louis I. He titled himself Knez of Donji Kraji.

With the help of Hrvoje, King Ostoja came to the throne in 1398. Sigmund broke into the Donji Kraji, but was suppressed by Hrvoje army. Ladislaus of Naples in 1403 awarded him the title of Duke of Split, giving him the islands of Brač, Hvar and Korčula. He was awarded administration of large territories on the Adriatic coast as his Viceroy in Dalmatia, and the title of Herceg of Split, grand Duke of Bosnia and Knez of Donji Kraji. In doing so, he became Sigmund's largest opponent in Bosnia.

In 1407, Sigmund led the Hungarian army and attacked Donji Kraji, but was stopped. The turning point came after the Sigmund victory in the Battle of Dobor (1408). Hrvoje did not personally participate in the battle, but the disaster of the Bosnian forces led him to reconcile with the Hungarian king. In doing so, he lost all the privileges he received from Ladislaus and his power declined. Hrvoje turned to the Ottomans and brought them to Bosnia resulting in the Battle of Doboj (1415) where Hungarians were defeated. He died at the beginning of 1416 after which his possessions disintegrated rapidly, and while parts remained within the family other were integrated into royal demesne. His widow Jelena later married the Bosnian king Ostoja. A major fortified castle of Jajce, which was built in the 14th century and initially was seat of Hrvoje Vukčić, now became one of the capital cities of the Kingdom of Bosnia as Jajce too, in the aftermath of Hrvoje's death, has passed back to the royal domain. It was royal domain located in Donji Kraji, as Stephen Thomas refers to it as "royal seat", and its citadel has a portal decorated by his Kotromanić royal coat of arms.

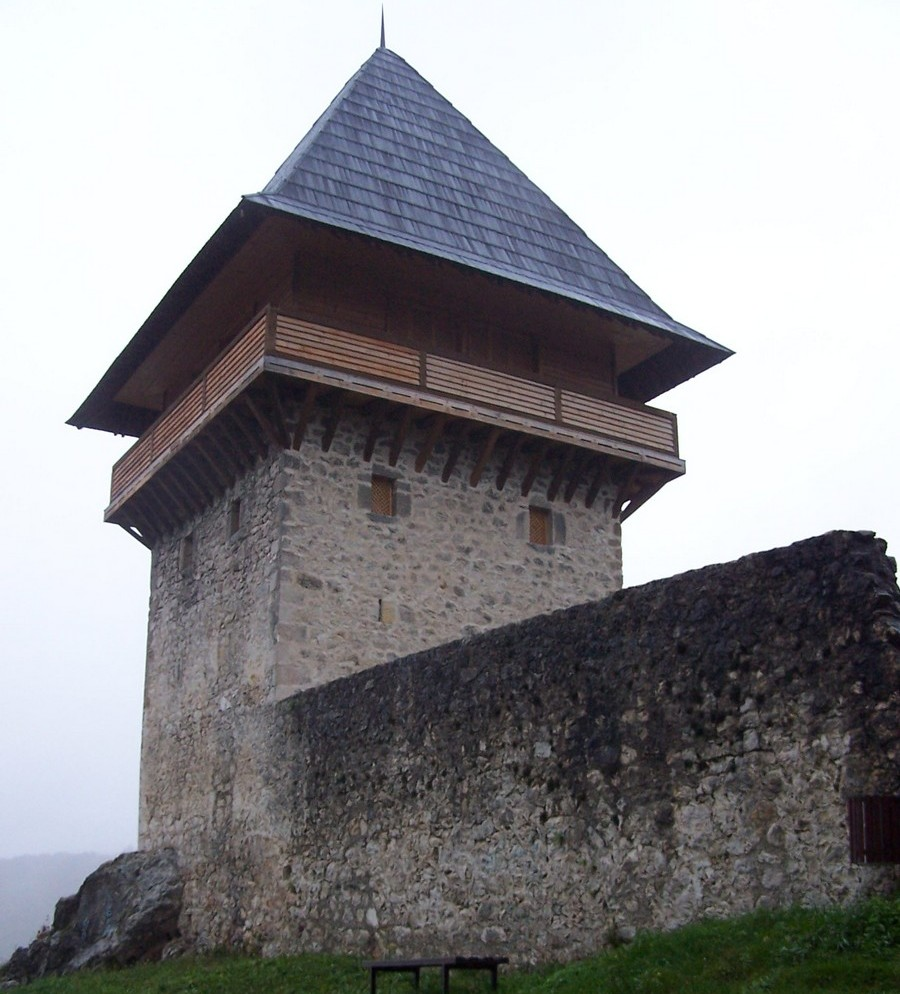
Ključ fortress, last stronghold of the last Bosnian King Stephen Tomašević.

=== Internal struggles and Ottoman incursions ===
Hrvoje left behind his son Balša who bore the title of Knez of Donji Kraji, but he died in 1416 so the bulk of the Donji Kraji went to his cousin Juraj Vojsalić. Even before 1386, it is possible to see the effects of the Ottomans' influence in medieval Bosnia, after numerous raids. Events during the 1410s marked the beginning of their active engagement. The Ottoman Empire supported the local nobility, led by Tvrtko II. After the Battle of Lašva on the Lašva river (in 1415), the Ottomans and Hungary became the most powerful factor in the local affairs. Navigating between these two forces, bans and kings in Bosnia resisted pressures from both sides. In the civil war that broke between the Bosnian King Tvrtko II and Grand Duke of Bosnia, Sandalj Hranić, in 1434 Juraj sided with his king.

Juraj was succeeded by his son Peter. The reign of Peter was marked by improved connections with the Pope who has repeatedly taken the Knez of Donji Kraji for protection, pointing out that he is the only one among the schismatic Bosnian rulers who has maintained true faith. Petar Vojsalić actively supported Vladislav Hercegović in the fight against his father, Stjepan Vukčić Kosača, and also sided with the Bosnian King during the civil war between Stjepan Vukčić and King Tomaš. Peter was last mentioned as alive in a Venetian document from 1456.

Ottomans launched a surprise attack on Bosnia, when they re-directed their troops from their supposed attack towards Hungary. The fortresses were quickly overrun, and Stephen Tomašević fled from Jajce towards Donji Kraji, while Queen Catherine fled to the coast via Kozograd royal castle and reached Dubrovnik. The Ottomans caught up to the king's forces at the fortress of Ključ on the Sana, where they imprisoned him and brought him back to Jajce, where he was beheaded in front of Mehmed the Conqueror.

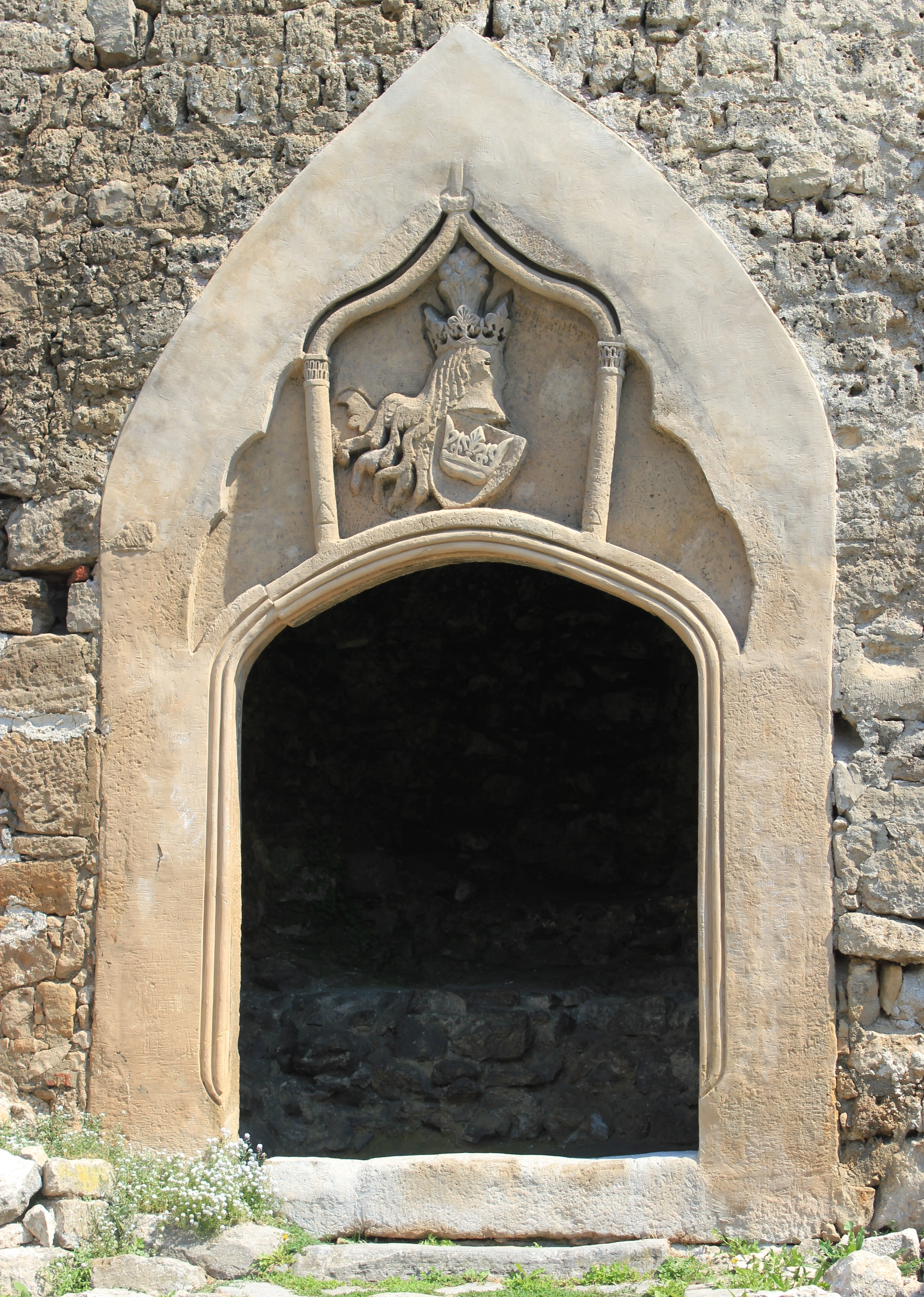
Jajce – Castle gate showing Kotromanić royal coat of arms of Stephen Thomas.

== Aftermath ==
After the fall of the Kingdom of Bosnia under the rule of the Ottomans, Hungarian King Matthias Corvinus captured northern Bosnia in late 1463, including Donji Kraji, where he formed the Banate of Jajce around the walled city of Jajce which was held until 1528. In this period the Banate of Jajce covered the entire area of Donji Kraji, except the župa of Uskoplje, which then was under Ottoman rule. After the fall of Jajce in early 16th century, the region became part of the Sanjak of Bosnia.

Since then the land was also known as Bosanska Krajina (first mentioned in 1594), and as Turkish Croatia on some 16-19th century maps although since medieval times never returned to be part of Croatia.

== List of župas ==
- Uskoplje
- Pliva
- Luka
- Vrbas
- Zemljanik
- Vrbanja
- Tribava (Trijebovo)
- Mel
- Lušci
- Banjica
- Sana
- Glaž
- Dubica

== See also ==
- History of Bosnia
- Ottoman conquest of Bosnia and Herzegovina

== Sources ==
- Anđelić, Pavao (1982). Studije o teritorijalnopolitičkoj organizaciji srednjovjekovne Bosne. Sarajevo: Svjetlost.
- Benac A., Ed. (1986): Bosna i Hercegovina / Bosnia and Herzegovia / Bosnien und Herzegowina. Svjetlost, Sarajevo.
- Brković, Milko (2002). Srednjovjekovna Bosna i Hum: identitet i kontinuitet. Mostar: Crkva na kamenu. ISBN 953-154-329-1.
- Brković, Milko (2005). "Bosansko-humski kršćani u križištu papinske i ugarske politike prema Bosni i Humu". In Šanjek, Franjo (ed.). Fenomen "krstjani" u srednjovjekovnoj Bosni i Humu. Sarajevo: Institut za istoriju. ISBN 9789958964251.
- Ćirković, Sima (1964). Istorija srednjovekovne bosanske države. Beograd: Srpska književna zadruga.
- Enciklopedija Jugoslavije, Ed. (1983): Socijalistička Republika Bosna i Hercegovina – Separat iz II izdanja Enciklopedije Jugoslavije. Jugoslavenski leksikografski zavod, Zagreb.
- Fine, John Van Antwerp Jr. (1994) [1987]. The Late Medieval Balkans: A Critical Survey from the Late Twelfth Century to the Ottoman Conquest. Ann Arbor, Michigan: University of Michigan Press. ISBN 0472082604.
- Hadžijahić, Muhamed (2004). Povijest Bosne u IX i X stoljeću. Sarajevo: Preporod. ISBN 9789958820274.
- Klaić, Vjekoslav (March 1880). "Topografske sitnice (I)". Journal of the Zagreb Archaeological Museum (in Croatian). 2 (1). Archaeological Museum, Zagreb: 68–69. ISSN 0350-7165.
- Klaić, Nada (1994). Srednjevjekovna Bosna - Politički položaj bosanskih vladara do Tvrtkove krunidbe. Zagreb: Eminex. ISBN 953-6112-05-1.
- Macan, Trpimir (1992). Povijest hrvatskoga naroda. Zagreb: Nakladni zavod Matice hrvatske. ISBN 9788640100588.
- Malcolm N. (1996): Bosnia: A Short History. New, Updating Edition, New York University Press, ISBN 0814755615.
- Mrgić, Jelena (2002). Donji Kraji: Krajina srednjovekovne Bosne. Belgrade: Filozofski fakultet. ISBN 978-86-80269-59-7.
- Mrgić, Jelena (2008). Severna Bosna: 13-16. vek [North Bosnia from 13th-16th century]. Belgrade: Filozofski fakultet.
- Raukar, Tomislav; Mirošević, Franko (1997). Hrvatsko srednjovjekovlje: prostor, ljudi, ideje. Zagreb: Školska knjiga. ISBN 9789530307032.
- Šišić, Ferdo (1902). Vojvoda Hrvoje Vukčić Hrvatinić i njegovo doba. (1350-1416). Zagreb: Izdanje "Matice hrvatske".
- Vego, Marko (1982). Postanak srednjovjekovne bosanske države. Sarajevo: Svjetlost.
- Vukičić, Gošić, Dragomir, Nevenka (1985). Collection of papers and materials of the fifth Yugoslav onomastic conference. Sarajevo: Akademija nauka i umjetnosti Bosne i Hercegovine.
