= 1363 =

1363 in various calendars
- Gregorian calendar: 1363; MCCCLXIII
- Ab urbe condita: 2116
- Armenian calendar: 812; ԹՎ ՊԺԲ
- Assyrian calendar: 6113
- Balinese saka calendar: 1284–1285
- Bengali calendar: 769–770
- Berber calendar: 2313
- English Regnal year: 36 Edw. 3 – 37 Edw. 3
- Buddhist calendar: 1907
- Burmese calendar: 725
- Byzantine calendar: 6871–6872
- Chinese calendar: 壬寅年 (Water Tiger); 4060 or 3853 — to — 癸卯年 (Water Rabbit); 4061 or 3854
- Coptic calendar: 1079–1080
- Discordian calendar: 2529
- Ethiopian calendar: 1355–1356
- Hebrew calendar: 5123–5124
- Hindu calendars
- Vikram Samvat: 1419–1420
- Shaka Samvat: 1284–1285
- Kali Yuga: 4463–4464
- Holocene calendar: 11363
- Igbo calendar: 363–364
- Iranian calendar: 741–742
- Islamic calendar: 764–765
- Japanese calendar: Jōji 2 (貞治２年)
- Javanese calendar: 1276–1277
- Julian calendar: 1363; MCCCLXIII
- Korean calendar: 3696
- Minguo calendar: 549 before ROC 民前549年
- Nanakshahi calendar: −105
- Thai solar calendar: 1905–1906
- Tibetan calendar: ཆུ་ཕོ་སྟག་ལོ་ (male Water-Tiger); 1489 or 1108 or 336 — to — ཆུ་མོ་ཡོས་ལོ་ (female Water-Hare); 1490 or 1109 or 337

"Leonardo Dandolo courageously attempting to quell the rebels of Candia, 9 August 1363", as rebels in Crete confront the Venetian Governor at the beginning of the Revolt of Saint Titus (1863 engraving by Giuseppe Gatteri and Antonio Vivian)

Year 1363 (MCCCLXIII) was a common year starting on Sunday of the Julian calendar.

== Events ==
=== January–March ===
- January 4 – The Lombardy towns of Magenta and Corbetta are captured from the control of Galeazzo Visconti by British mercenaries hired by the Marquis of Monferrato, Guglielmo VII Aleramici.
- February 21 – Simon Langham is appointed by King Edward III as the new Lord Chancellor of England after the retirement of the Chancellor William Edington.
- March 14 – Gabriele Adorno is elected as the new Doge of the Republic of Genoa following the sudden death of the Doge Simone Boccanegra.

=== April–June ===
- April 9 – King Haakon VI of Norway marries Princess Margrethe of Estridsen, the daughter of King Valdemar IV of Denmark in a ceremony at the Copenhagen Cathedral. Margrethe will become Queen of Denmark in 1387 after Haakon's death.
- May 7 – (12 Pashons 1080 AM) In Egypt, the bishop Youhanna of Damascus is elected as the new Pope of the Coptic Orthodox Christians and takes the regnal name of Pope John X of Alexandria. He serves until his death on July 13, 1369.
- May 8 – Charles IV, Holy Roman Emperor and his former son-in-law, King Lajos of Hungary meet at Uherské Hradiště (now in the Czech Republic) to conclude a peace agreement to avoid a battle over control of Bohemia.
- May 29 – Al-Ashraf Sha'ban is installed as the Sultan of Egypt at the age after the Emir Yalbugha al-Umari leads a coup d'état against the Sultan Al-Mansur Muhammad, who had reigned for two years.
- June 1 – King Edward III of England summons the English Parliament, directing the members to assemble at Westminster on October 6.
- June 15 – at the age of 2, Prince Wenceslaus of Luxembourg, the son of Charles IV, Holy Roman Emperor, is crowned at St. Vitus Cathedral in Prague as Vaclav IV, King of Bohemia, the position formerly held by his father. The Archbishop of Prague, Arnošt of Pardubice, places the crown on the head of the child, despite his protest that crowning an infant is a mockery of the coronation ceremony.
- June 29 – Edward, the Black Prince, son of King Edward III of England and heir to the English throne, arrives in Bordeaux to become the new administrator of the Duchy of Aquitaine, a principality that had been ceded by France to England under the Treaty of Bretigny.

=== July–September ===
- July 1 – Louis, Duke of Anjou, the son of the French King John the Good, arrives in France after having been held a hostage in London since 1360 in exchange for King John's release from captivity as a prisoner of war. The escape leads to a crisis that ends with King John's voluntary return to imprisonment in England six months later.
- July 2 – An envoy of Pope Urban V, Jean de la Grange, arranges the signing of the Peace of Morvedre (now Sagunto in Spain) to end the "War of the Two Pedros between King Pedro of Castile (aided by England and other nations) and King Pedro IV of Aragon (aided by France), but neither side attempts to ratify the accords. Fighting continues until 1369 when Pedro of Castile is overthrown and replaced by Enrique de Trastámara.
- July 8 – King Lajos I of Hungary leads an attack on Sokograd in Bosnia and begins a three-day siege that is defended by Vukac Hrvatinić, whose son Hrvoje Vukčić Hrvatinić will later become the Grand Duke of Bosnia. The Bosnian defense saves the city and King Lajos is forced to retreat with his troops back to Hungary after three days.
- August 8 – The Revolt of Saint Titus, against the rule of the Republic of Venice in the Kingdom of Candia (island of Crete), begins.
- August 15 – The Army of China's rebel leader Zhu Wenzheng marches from Nanjing with 100,000 troops toward the Han State to confront Zhang Shicheng.
- August 30– The Battle of Lake Poyang, one of the largest naval battles in history begins in Yuan dynasty China between multiple ships and 650,000 rebels led by Chen Youliang, against a smaller force of 200,000 troops led by the Red Turban Rebel Zhu Yuanzhang and continues for five weeks.
- September 6 – Philip the Bold (Philippe II le Hardi), son of King John the Good (Jean le Bon) is secretly designated as the new Duke of Burgundy by the King after the death of the previous Duke, Philip of Rouvres. Previously, Guillaume IV de Melun, Count of Tancarville, had been administrator of Burgundy since the death in 1361 of the prior Duke, Philip of Rouvres, until King John had become dissatisfied with him.

=== October–December ===
- October 4 – The Battle of Lake Poyang ends as Zhu Yuanzhang and his Red Turban Rebels defeat the rebels led by Chen Youliang.
- October 6 – The English Parliament is opened at Westminster for a 24-day session.
- October 30 – King Edward III gives royal assent to laws passed by the Parliament as its session closes, including the Statute Concerning Diet and Apparel 1363, a sumptuary law limiting the style of clothing that people of different classes were allowed to wear, aimed at halting a trend by lower class and middle class to wear fashions similar to more wealthy English citizens, as well as requiring higher prices for "hen, capon, pullet and goose". The new law has 19 chapters setting the dress code for "handicraftsmen and yeomen" (c. 9), "gentlemen under the estate of knights" (c.10), merchants (c.11), knights with lands of a value of 200 marks and knights with lands of 400 marks (c.12), clerks (c.13), and ploughmen (c.14).
- November 26 – Pope Urban V selects Cardinal Androin de la Roche to replace Cardinal Gil Álvarez Carrillo de Albornoz as the papal negotiator to establish peace with the Lord of Milan, Bernabò Visconti.
- December 20 – John de Coupland, the ruthless Sheriff of Northumberland in England who had taken King David II of Scotland as a prisoner of war for 11 years following the 1346 Battle of Neville's Cross, is assassinated by a group of his enemies as he is trying to cross through Bolton le Moors in Lancashire. A contemporary account notes that later that "nine of the attackers wielded lances and eleven were archers," and that they all fled across the border to Scotland after the murder.

=== Date unknown ===
- Ottoman Turks seize Filibe (Philippopolis) in Thrace in the Byzantine–Ottoman wars.
- Dmitry Donskoy, Prince of the Grand Duchy of Moscow, dethrones Dmitry of Suzdal to become Grand Prince of Vladimir.
- Al-Afdal al-Abbas succeeds Al-Mujahid Ali as Rasulid Sultan of Yemen.
- The Mosque-Madrassa of Sultan Hassan is completed in Cairo, Egypt.

== Births ==
- July 2 – Maria, Queen of Sicily (d. 1401)
- December 13 – Jean Gerson, chancellor of the University of Paris (d. 1429)
- date unknown
  - Margaret of Bavaria, Burgundian regent (d. 1423)
  - Thomas Langley, bishop of Durham and lord chancellor of England (d. 1437)
- probable – Zeami Motokiyo, Japanese actor and playwright (d. 1443)

== Deaths ==
- January 13 – Meinhard III, Count of Tyrol
- March 3 – Simone Boccanegra, first doge of Genoa (approximate date)
- c. April – Blanche of Namur, queen consort of Sweden (b. 1320)
- July 29 – John Bardolf, 3rd Baron Bardolf (b. 1314)
- October 3 – Chen Youliang, founder of the Dahan regime (b. 1320)
- October 7 – Eleanor de Bohun, Countess of Ormonde (b. 1304)
- date unknown
  - Adil-Sultan, khan of the Chagatai Khanate
  - Jean Buridan, French philosopher (b. 1295)
- probable – Ranulf Higdon, English chronicler (b. c. 1299)
