= Hrvatinić noble family =

Bosnian medieval noble family

Hrvatinić
- Country: Banate of Bosnia; Kingdom of Bosnia; Kingdom of Hungary
- Founded: fl. 1299
- Founder: Hrvatin Stjepanić
- Current head: Extinct
- Final ruler: Matija Vojsalić
- Titles: Knez; Duke; Grand Duke of Bosnia; King of Bosnia (titular)
- Estates: Lower Edges, Western Sides in Bosnia, Dalmatia
- Dissolution: 1476
- Cadet branches: Vojsalić, Dragišić

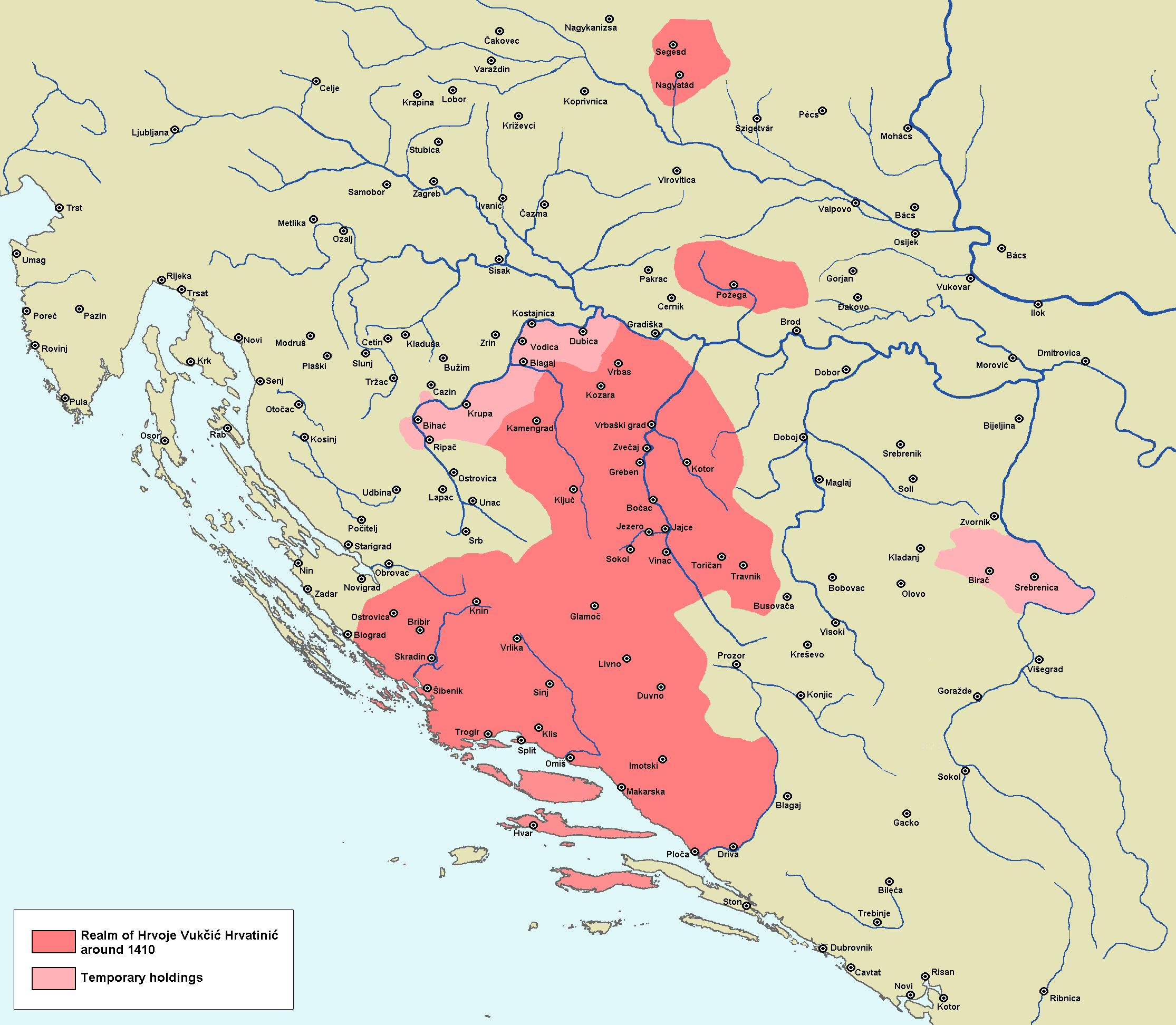
Realm of Hrvoje Vukčić in the early 15th century

The House of Hrvatinić was a Bosnian medieval noble family that emerged in Donji Kraji county, located in today's territory of western Bosnia and Herzegovina. Principally they were vassals to Kotromanić dynasty of the Banate of Bosnia and Kingdom of Bosnia, occasionally also to the Kingdom of Hungary, changing loyalties between Hungarian kings Ladislaus of Naples and Sigismund of Luxembourg, and finally the Ottoman Empire (1472–1476). They rose to prominence in the second half of the 14th century, and attained its peak under magnate Hrvoje Vukčić Hrvatinić (1350–1416), who also held large swaths of Dalmatia and obtained title of Grand Duke of Bosnia in 1380.

== Background ==
The family can be traced from the second-half of the 13th century and were cousins and relatives of the Croatian noble Šubić family. Some authors consider they could originate from the Croatian noble Čubranić family, as 1420 was mentioned Hrvoje Hrvatinić de genere Zubranich, but that's an unlikely coincidence. It is considered that in the beginning had estates in the "Donji Kraji" (English: Lower Ends), specifically in župa Banica with town Ključ, Vrbanja with town Kotor (Kotor Varoš) and Zemljanik with town Greben as well as Glamoč.

== History ==
The family started to grow in power during Stjepan (d. before 1301) whose only surely known son was named as Hrvatin. The family's eponymous founder was Hrvatin Stjepanić (fl. 1299–1304), a count and holder of possession in parts of "Donji Kraji" (English: Lower Area) and "Zapadne Strane" (English: "Western Sides"), and a vassal of Croatian magnate Paul I Šubić of Bribir. Hrvatin's sons was part of a coalition of Bosnian and Slavonian nobility that revolted against Mladen II Šubić of Bribir between 1316 and 1317.

From around 1322 the family submitted to the Kotromanić dynasty of the Banate of Bosnia, but during the Hungarian-Bosnian struggles until 1357 mostly allied with the Hungarian king. In 1363, the Hrvatinić supported Tvrtko I of Bosnia against Hungary, after which they came up through the ranks in Bosnia, while their most prominent member, Hrvoje Vukčić, along with major new possessions in Donji Kraji and Zapadne Strane was awarded with the title Grand Duke of Bosnia.

In c. 1387, while loyal to Tvrtko I, they supported rebellion in Dalmatia against Sigismund. The last member of the family was Matija Vojsalić who was last mentioned in the archives of Republic of Ragusa in 1476. He was installed as a puppet king of Bosnia by the Ottoman sultan as an answer to Nicholas of Ilok, named king of Bosnia by Matthias Corvinus. Matija Vojsalić was removed after conspiring with Matthias Corvinus against the Ottomans and was not mentioned after that.

== Religion ==
During the 1320s, the first mention of the institutionally developed Bosnian Church is tied to the clan, to which some branches were affiliated. Other branches, however, were loyal to the Catholic Church and were also relatives of the Bribir's knezs, to which they owe their rise under the Croatian-Hungarian throne and helped Bribir's extend their rule over the greater part of the Bosnian Banate for couple of decades.

== Lineage ==
- Stjepan or Stipan (Latin: Stephan; died before 1301), according to F. Šišić possibly knez in Donji Kraji, possibly as early as 1244.
  - Hrvatin Stjepanić (Latin: Horvatinus, Huruatin; fl. 1299–1304), knez (count) in Donji Kraji of Bosnia (de inferioribus Bosne confinibus) and vassal of Paul I Šubić of Bribir. Believed by F. Šišić to have died around the same time as Paul I (1312). He had three sons. Called Hrvatin Stjepanić or Hrvatin Stipanić in historiography.
    - Vukoslav Hrvatinić (Latin: Vlkosslaus; fl. 1315–1326), issued a charter in 1315 in Sanica. In ca. 1326, Ban Stjepan II in a land grant mentioned that Vukoslav "had left the Croatian lord". Served as Knez of Ključ (fl. 1325). Married Jelena, the daughter of Knez Kurjak.
      - Vlatko (fl. 1364)
    - Pavao Hrvatinić (fl. 1323–1332)
      - Grgur (fl. 1357)
      - Vladislav (fl. 1357)
    - Vukac Hrvatinić (fl. 1357–1366), defended the Soko fortress in the Pliva county in ca. 1363 against the Hungarians, for which he was awarded an entire župa Pliva and a title of vojvoda (transl. duke) by Ban Tvrtko I.

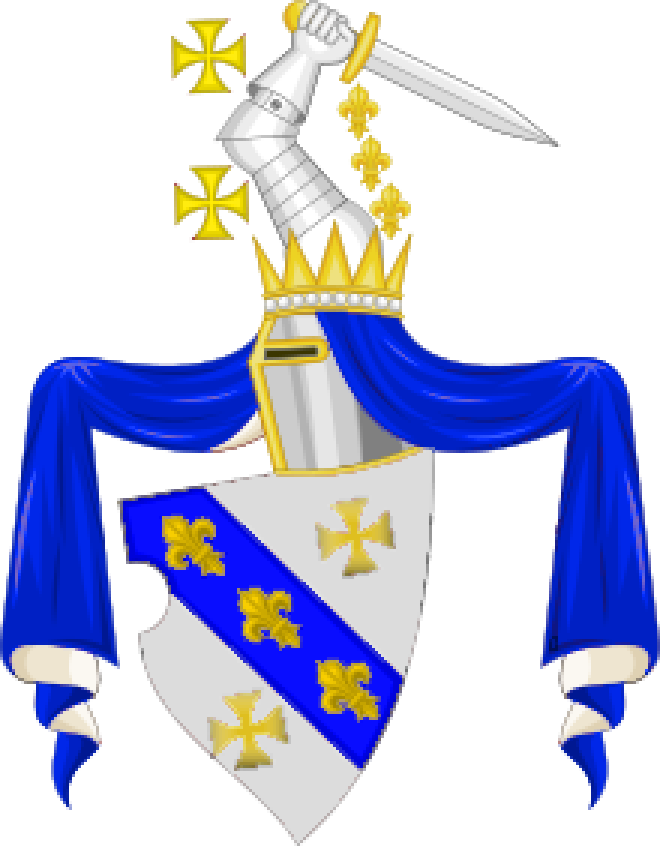
Coat of arms of Hrvoje Vukčić Hrvatinić, often wrongly identified as the family CoA.

      - Hrvoje Vukčić Hrvatinić (1350–1416), Grand Duke of Bosnia (1380), Knez of Donji Kraji and Duke of Split (1403) His sister Resa Vukčić princess of Split was married to Knez Batalo Šantić.
      - Vuk Vukčić Hrvatinić
        - Katarina Vuković Hrvatinić
        - Jelena Vuković Hrvatinić
      - Vojislav Vukčić Hrvatinić
        - Juraj Vojsalić
          - Petar Vojsalić
            - Matija Vojsalić
          - Pavao Jurjević Hrvatinić
          - Nikola Jurjević Hrvatinić
          - Vlatko Jurjević Hrvatinić
          - Juraj Jurjević Hrvatinić
        - Vukašin Vojsalić Hrvatinić
          - Vuk Vukčević Hrvatinić
      - Dragiša Vukčić Hrvatinić Hrvatinić
        - Ivaniš Dragišić Hrvatinić
          - Pavao Dragišić Hrvatinić
          - Marko Dragišić Hrvatinić
          - Juraj Dragišić

== See also ==
- Kosača
- Pavlović
- Zlatonosović

== Notes ==
1. Hrvatin Stjepanić is called in 1299 by Charles II of Naples as "Hrovatinus comes, nec non filii et fratres eius, consanguinei et cognati virorum nobilium Pauli, bani Croatorum nec non Georgii et Mladeni, fratrum" (of Paul I Šubić of Bribir and his brothers George I and Mladen I Šubić), while by Paul I Šubić as "compatrem nostrum dilectum et fidelem" (1304) and "cognati nostri dilecti et fidelis" (1305).

== Sources ==
- Ančić, Mladen (1997). Putanja klatna: Ugarsko-hrvatsko kraljevstvo i Bosna u 14. stoljeću. Acad. Scientiarum et Artium Croatica. ISBN 978-953-154-308-8.
- Fine, John V. A. Jr. (1994). The Late Medieval Balkans: A Critical Survey from the Late Twelfth Century to the Ottoman Conquest. Ann Arbor: University of Michigan Press. ISBN 978-0-472-08260-5.
- Fine, John V. A. Jr. (1975). The Bosnian Church: a New Interpretation: a Study of the Bosnian Church and Its Place in State and Society from the 13th to the 15th Centuries. East European Quarterly. ISBN 978-0-914710-03-5.
- Klaić, Nada (1989). Srednjovjekovna Bosna: politički položaj bosanskih vladara do Tvrtkove krunidbe, 1377. g. Grafički zavod Hrvatske. ISBN 978-86-399-0104-2.
- Kurtović, Esad (2009). Veliki vojvoda bosanski Sandalj Hranić Kosača. Vol. Book 4 (Historijske monografije ed.). Institut za istoriju. ISBN 978-9958-649-01-1.
- Šišić, Ferdo (1902). Vojvoda Hrvoje Vukčić Hrvatinić i njegovo doba. (1350-1416): s jednim tlorisom i zemljovidom te s četiri redoslovne table. Izdanje "Matice hrvatske".
