= Ključ Castle (Ključ) =

Ključ
- Ključ; Bosnia and Herzegovina
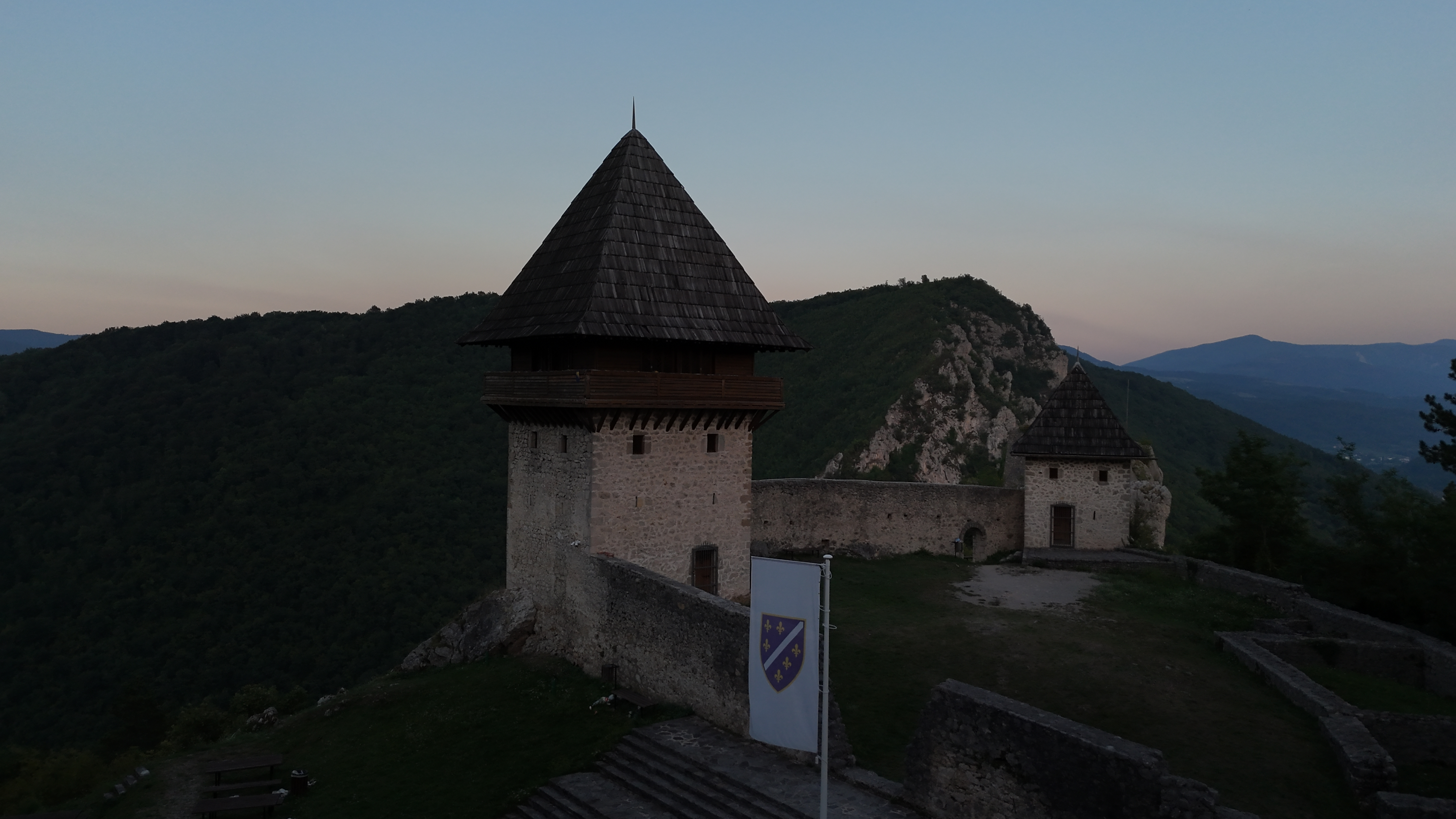
- Ključ, Old Town Fortress

Site information
- Type: town-fortress
- Owner: The Government of Bosnia and Herzegovina
- Condition: Ruin

Location
- Coordinates: 44.53768°N 16.78582°E

Site history
- Built: Unknown-12th century
- Built by: (unknown)
- In use: Until 19th century
- Materials: limestone in dry stone walling
- Battles/wars: Battle of Kljuc (1463)

Garrison information
- Designations

KONS of Bosnia and Herzegovina
- Official name: Fort of Ključ in Ključ, the architectural ensemble
- Type: Category I monument
- Criteria: II. Value; A, B, D i.ii.iii.iv.v., E iii.v., F, G v., H, I i.ii.iii.
- Designated: 20 May 2003 (session No. )
- Reference no.: 1329
- Decision no.: 06-6-741/03-3
- Listed: List of National Monuments of Bosnia and Herzegovina
- Operator: -
- Site is protected as National Monument of Bosnia and Herzegovina by the Government of BiH and its KONS

Ključ Fortress is a medieval fortress in Bosnia and Herzegovina, above the modern-day town of Ključ. It is located on an elongated slope on high rocks that dominate the valley of the river Sana. Before it was redeveloped, there was a small ancient fortress from Roman times.

== Etymology ==
In Serbo-Croatian, word ključ literally means "key". The Ključ Fortress was likely named in reference to the geographical position it had within the Bosnian state territory, located in the border area, where it was "key of Bosnia" (ključ Bosne).

== Location and description ==
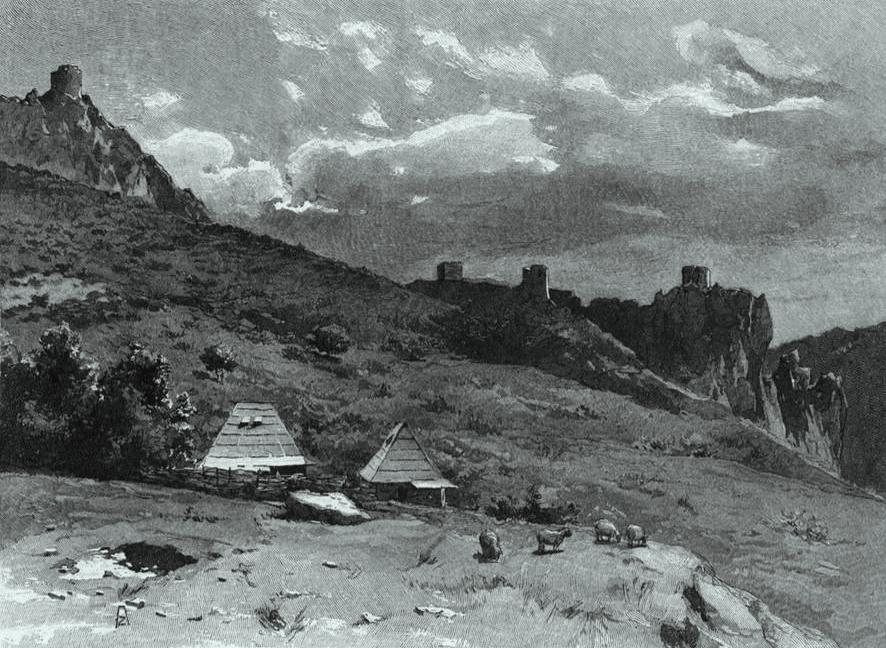
Ključ, as seen from the south

The fortress complex was nested above the left bank of the Sana, on a steep rugged cliff at an altitude of 521 m, at the place where the Sana enters the narrow gorge between cliffs of Breščica (528 m) and Ljubinska (656 m), in a naturally extremely well defended position. Traces of fortification buildings from an ancient times are found in place of medieval fortress, some from Roman times at the main plateau near the Ljubica tower, and some masonry even more ancient on a narrow terrace just below the fortress. An important crossing over the Sana was monitored from this fortress, controlling a traffic through the Sana valley, which connected Pounje with the Pliva and Vrbas valleys.

The fortress complex consists of three parts connected by walls: the town with its castle-town (in Serbo-Croatian: podgrađe), Tabor and Ljubica (Lubica) towers. The oldest core is the town with its podgrađe, which is protected by a high rampart on the north (access) side. Tabor and Ljubica towers were extended in the Ottoman era. Ljubica is a protruding tower that was erected as a side protection of the core of the fortress.

== History ==
At first the region around the town was part of the župa of Mrena, and later the župa of Brnjice-Banica. In the Late Middle Ages, a unique territorial-political unit was formed as the župa of Sanica, in which Ključ was a seat. It was already one of the oldest towns during the 13th century. Ključ was first explicitly mentioned in 1322, in the charter of Ban Stjepan II Kotromanić, who granted the župas of Banica (Mrenska župa) and Vrbanja, with the towns of Ključ and Kotor, to Vukoslav Hrvatinić of Hrvatinić nobel family.

The fortress was inherited by Vukoslav Hrvatinić's son, Vlatko Vukoslavić. In 1364, Vlatko ceded the fortress to the Hungarian king Louis I in exchange for possessions in Hungary, namely Slavonian town Bršljanovac. After the death of Louis I in 1382, Ključ and other family estates was retaken by Hrvoje Vukčić Hrvatinić, Grand Duke of Bosnia, at the time the head of the family, in a successful military campaign. Being childless, some of Hrvoje's possessions, including Ključ, became inheritance of the grandchildren of Hrvoje's brother, župan Dragiša Vukčić.

The town with its castle-town is mentioned in the charter of King Stjepan Tomaš in issued in Vranduk in 1446, when he confirmed the possession of Ključ to Ivaniš Dragišić and his sons. Although the town of Ključ has been known for 120 years at the time, only in this charter of King Tomaš is the castle-town mentioned by name of Podključ.

Ključ was the last capital of the Bosnian king Stjepan Tomašević, who withdrew from Jajce to Ključ before the Ottomans, so the town rightly received the epithet Royal City. The last episode between the Bosnian and Ottoman armies took place under its walls in 1463, marking the end of the independence of the medieval Bosnian state.

Since then, Bosnia has become a part of the great Ottoman Empire as the Bosnian Sanjak, and later as the Bosnian Eyalet (Pashaluk). In the first years, the town was the gathering place of the Ottoman army for further conquests towards Bihać and the Croatian-Austro-Hungarian territories. During the Ottoman rule, Ključ was the seat of the nahija, kadiluk and captaincy. A similar story is repeated in 1878 during the Austro-Hungarian occupation of Bosnia and Herzegovina, when Bosnians offered strong resistance to the Austro-Hungarian army here.

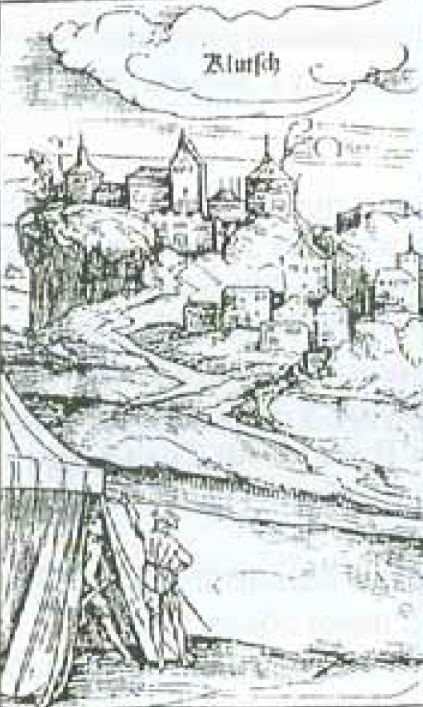
Ključ on the Sana, Donji Kraji, Bosnia, Kupreskić

== In culture ==
The image of Ključ is preserved on the engraving in the travelogue of Benedikt Kuripešić from 1530.

== Protection ==
The Commission to Preserve National Monuments of BiH declared the Architectural Ensemble - Old Town of Ključ a National Monument of Bosnia and Herzegovina on 12 May 2003.

== Literature ==
- Tihomir Glavaš, Ključ, Arheološki leksikon Bosne i Hercegovine, Tom II, Zemaljski muzej Bosne i Hercegovine, Sarajevo 1988, 147.
- Jelena Mrgić, Кључ на Сани, Лексикон градова и тргова средњовековних српских земаља - према писаним изворима - Zavod za udžbenike, Beograd 2010, str. 128–129.
- Marko Vego, Naselja srednjovjekovne bosanske države. Svjetlost, Sarajevo 1957., 105
- Ivo Bojanovski, Ključ na Sani, Ključ – srednjovjekovni grad. Arheološki pregled 15, Savez arheoloških društava Jugoslavije, Beograd 1973, 100 –105.
- Ivo, Bojanovski, Ključ na Sani, Ključ – srednjovjekovni grad. Arheološki pregled 23, Savez arheoloških društava Jugoslavije, Beograd, 1982, 140–142.
- Desanka Kovačević-Kojić, Gradska naselja srednjovjekovne bosanske države. Sarajevo, Veselin Masleša, 1978.
