= Ključ Castle =

Ključ Castle may refer to:

- Ključ Castle (Gacko), in Bosnia and Herzegovina
- Ključ Castle (Ključ), in Bosnia and Herzegovina
