= Šerif Konjević =

- Born: 26 April 1958 (age 67); Sanica, PR Bosnia and Herzegovina, FPR Yugoslavia
- Occupation: Musician
- Musical career
- Genres: Pop-folk, Folk
- Instrument: Vocals
- Labels: Nimfa Sound, Hayat Production

Šerif Konjević (born 26 April 1958) is a Bosnian pop-folk singer and one of the most prominent from the former Yugoslavia. He is considered an aficionado in his relative genre and often performs across various parts of former Yugoslavia and around the world.

== Early life ==
Šerif Konjević was born in Sanica, a village in the municipality of Ključ, Bosnia and Herzegovina.

== Discography ==
- O suze moje (1975)
- Šansu mi jednu pruzi (1977)
- Novo ime Sarajevske strade (1979)
- Zagrli me, zagrli (1979)
- Golubica bijela (1980)
- Bela venčanica (1982)
- Kunem se u brata svoga (1983)
- Naći ću je po mirisu kose (1984)
- Hej kafano ostavljam te (1985)
- Bez tebe ja živjet neću(1986)
- Lani je bio mraz (1987)
- Zbog tebe sam vino pio (1988)
- Devojačke suze (1989)
- Nikad u proleće (1990)
- Neko čudno vreme (1991)
- Alipašin izvor (1995)
- Ti si tu iz navike (1997)
- Znam da idem dalje (1999)
