= Kotor Castle =

- Hrvojev grad, also Kotorgrad
- Kotor Varoš, Bosnia and Herzegovina

Site information
- Type: Castle (residential, fortification)
- Owner: Hrvoje Vukčić, Bosnian noble family of Hrvatinić
- Condition: Ruined (National Monument of Bosnia and Herzegovina)

Location
- Location within Bosnia and Herzegovina
- Coordinates: 44.607007°N 17.370635°E

Site history
- Built: before 1382 (14th century)
- In use: earliest 1382 to at least 1853
- Materials: Limestone

Garrison information
- Past commanders: Hrvatinić noble family
- Site is protected as National Monument of Bosnia and Herzegovina by the Government of BiH and its KONS

Kotor or Kotorgrad (transl. Kotor town), was a medieval fortress above the present settlement of Kotor in Kotor Varoš, Bosnia and Herzegovina, Republic of Srpska entity, municipality of Kotor Varoš. During the medieval Kingdom of Bosnia, the fortress is developed to be a first and favorite seat of Hrvoje Vukčić, lord of Donji Kraji, parish Vrbanja, along of other two, Ključ and Jajce.

== History ==
In some recent (2002) sources states that the settlement below the fort called Kotorište, which was never fit the actual situation, because Kotorište, the Kotor Varoš's settlement is on the opposite (right) bank of the Vrbanja river.

In its original form (whose ruins still exist), there was a tower, slightly up the ridge above the Jakotina river, and dungeon (just above the waterfall). The tower and the dungeons were connected with stone staircase, whose broken remains are still visible. In the tower, until the liberation of Kotor Varoš in 1945, a bell of impressive size existed. Its fate is unknown.

For the first time Kotor was mentioned in 1382. It belonged to Duke Hrvoje Vukčić Hrvatinić (1350-1416). Kotor remained Hrvoje's favourite estate, where he died.

Kotor later became part of the Jajce Banovina, and the Ottomans conquered it in 1519, 52 years after the official fall of Bosnia. Occupying forces to shine down the Vrbanja valley, and the strongest resistance to their further penetration provided by the defense Kotor in Bettle on Večićko field, followed by the Ottomans soon overran and Banja Luka, Srbac, and Kobaš, Derventa and the whole Posavina . Then, briefly crossed in Slavonia .

Timars of Kotor's mustafhiz were even in villages around Visoko, and Visoko's Dubrovnik (probably the main commercial offices). Hamdija Kreševljaković assumes that mustafhiz "in Kotor moved out of a city, which was closer to the Visoko". Until 1838, Kotor had its own crew. During the Austrian occupation of the right bank of the Sava, in Kotor is moved crews and administration Kobaška captaincy, which was under the jurisdiction of the judicial Jajce captaincy. It was noted that 1833 . In Kotor was established only one gun.

Hamdija Kreševljaković further writes, according to unwritten sources:

... "By the name known to me these Dizdars: Huseinaga 1557, Salihaga to 1748, his hereditary Avdagaof 1758 until after 1793, Mehmedaga 1810 and his son Abdurahmanaga 1816. In 1858 Salihaga voluntarily ceded service dizdars his brother Avdaga. Dizdars timar in Tačbilu amounted to 3,400 akces. Anonymous description says that Kotor small fortresses, surrounded by a wall, with small cannons, and with it the suburb, approximately seventy houses ... "

Kreševljaković take Jukić as the source to the city and fortress of Kotor called Bobas, "and people can still hear "Bobac" If he had left the town of Kotor, learned to be so called waterfall under former bosses and powerful source, one of them more, drinking water. Even in the 1960s, for a Ramadan iftar, water is referred to more remote households Kotor Varoš. The population of Kotor is said to have been the "Bobac", while those from other parts of the city insist the allegedly "proper" "Bobas".

== Research and preservation ==
The current condition of the tower and the dungeon reflects a lack of maintenance for the medieval site, and local authorities have not utilized the structure as a tourist attraction.

== See also ==
- Kotor Varoš
- Donji Kraji
- Hrvoje Vukčić Hrvatinić
