= Zemlja (feudal Bosnia) =

Unit of territory in medieval Bosnia

Zemlja (plural: zemlje, anglicized: zemljas; Latin: terra; English: Land), was a term used in the Balkans during much of the Middle Ages as a unit in political-territorial state division, based on feudal social hierarchy, local administrative control and the feudal distribution of land. It was the largest unit of administration, which constituted a feudal state among South Slavic peoples of the Balkans at the time, Bosnia, Croatia, Montenegro (Zeta) and Serbia. The same term is known to be used among other Slavic nations of medieval Europe, namely Poles and Russians, who called it Zemlya, Ziemlia, or Ziemia, and although it has a similar meaning and significance it is not the same.

== Background ==
In the case of medieval Bosnian state, the basic schemes of the territorial-political organization of the feudal state in the areas to which it had expanded were: zemlja (land), župa (parish), seoska općina (village municipality), and vlastelinstvo (manor). To some extent this division was probably influenced by earlier Byzantine administration, and additionally by specific socio-economic relations between the Slavic migrating populations and the indigenous people namely Romanized Illyrians, since the Middle Ages called Vlach. It is significant that as early as the 10th century, the chieftains in the territories neighboring to Bosnia had Byzantine official titles, and that in the zemlja-župa-village scheme, a military organization of the tithe system could be observed. This division can be defined as the transitional socio-economic system or military democracy, as well as the administrative and political organization of the borderlands of the Byzantine Empire.

== Organizational history ==
The zemlja is a political-territorial unit composed of an average of 10 župas, usually 7 to 12. In earlier times, zemljas were tightly organized and regularly showed a degree of political independence. Over time, this independence declined, and zemlja entered the ranks of larger political communities, while at the same time, feudalism dissolved their political organization, so that only geographical name and terminology remained. In addition to the most common form of hierarchical dependencies, the other forms of interrelationships were either complete political independence, or more often a parallelism, thus, for example, zemljas, and same can be said for župas, in certain historical conditions, existed as an independent part of the wider state union, or as a generally recognized geographical term. On the other hand, village-municipalities and manors, could only show parallelism at most, but also overlap in aspect of governorship among each other. At the head of zemljas were hereditary rulers with the title of knez, vojvoda (duke), ban or king, and in the case of foreign titles also župan or dominus.

Historians, although cautiously, point out the parallelism between zemljas and the so-called sclavinias on the eastern coast of the Adriatic Sea, but less cautiously to the fact that appearance of sclavinias and early feudal zemljas largely coincides with the administrative division of the late Roman Empire. Looking through historical sources historians concluded how political organization of zemljas disintegrated over time, and their strength eroded by the creation of larger state formations, and/or by the formation of new feudalna oblasts (transl. feudal regions).

=== Zemlja Bosna ===
Zemlja Bosna of all other zemljas that were part of the Bosnian state, was only one clearly defined politically, geographically and temporally. It was organized as zemlja (horion) in the 10th century, and it has always preserved a certain individuality within the later larger and more developed medieval Bosnian state.

=== Donji Kraji ===
Donji Kraji (lit. Lower Ends), in size and organization, correspond exactly to the physiognomy of an early feudal zemlja. For the entire duration of the medieval Bosnian state, this area has its own political organization, which means that it is regularly in the title of rulers, the representatives of the Donji Kraji are very active in the state noble council (stanak), and the whole area is governed by a knez, later a duke. The term Donji Kraji (Lower Ends) itself seems to have been created out of necessity (in the absence of another better or older name). and that the organization of this area was developed only after the absorption into the Bosnian state.

=== Humska zemlja ===
Humska zemlja or Hum is a well-known land from the early Middle Ages as Zahumlje, however, by the time most of Hum's territory belonged to Bosnia, the political organization of Zahumlje as a whole had already been destroyed. From early 14th century, the entire territory of Hum is part of the Bosnian state, the name appears in the ruling title (Ban Stjepan II is even the formal Knez of Hum), in the state council sit nobles "from Hum". Duke Stjepan Vukčić wore the title "lord of the land of Hum", but that is something completely different in content. In the 14th century, the entire area between the Neretva and the Cetina was annexed to the Bosnian state, which represents the entire land part of the former "land" of the Naretnines. The political organization of this area was already liquidated at the time when the Bosnian state expanded there, but it can be noticed that even in the 15th century the memory of the former political entity did not completely disappear. It is significant that the noble Radivojević family tried to unite this area into a single feudal area in the second decade of the 15th century. In the second half of the 14th century, the entire area of the former "land" of Travunija (Trebinje) became part of Bosnia. However, the political organization of this zemlja was already so fragmented at the time that it did not appear in the title of rulers or in any other form during the entire period of the Bosnian state nor later. There is only one geographical content left, and that is only in the understanding of the (surrounding) population of the nearest areas.

=== Usora ===
Usora was another important zemlja and feudalna oblast transl. feudal region) of the medieval Bosnian state. The administrative seat of this zemlja was Srebrenik, which also served as residence for its rulers for entire period of existence of the medieval Bosnian state. It took its name from the river Usora. In the 14th century zemlja Usora will absorb neighboring zemlja Soli.

Usora have joined Bosnia as an already formed political-territorial unit of approximate zemlja rank and entered the title of Bosnian rulers, and while it has always preserved a certain individuality, it also enlarged its volume within Bosnia on the expense of other regions, namely Soli and Lower Podrinje. its representatives constantly participated in the work of the Stanak, and the unifying factor is the position of the Usora duke.

=== Soli ===
Soli or Só was a zemlja located in today's northern Bosnia and Herzegovina, centered around the town of Tuzla. Initially, a Slavic župa, the County of Soli became an integral part of Kulin's Bosnia and later both of Banate of Bosnia and of the Kingdom of Bosnia. The meaning of the name is "salts". With the arrival of the Ottoman Empire around 1512, the names of the villages "Gornje Soli" and "Donje Soli" were translated to "Memlehai-bala" and "Memlehai-zir", literally meaning Upper and Lower Saltworks, resp. Zemlja Soli will eventually be incorporated into zemlja Usora in the 14th century. Before that happened, Soli was specially organized in the early feudal period. As such, it entered the title of Bosnian rulers, but somewhere in the first half of the 14th century it completely merged with Usora. Apart from the name and only the approximate territory, we know nothing about the organization of this zemlja.

=== Other examples ===
Podgorje is another area, which as a whole was part of the Bosnian state. It had, at least occasionally, a political organization and a size that corresponded to the physiognomy of a zemlja. This is a mountainous area, located between zemljas of Bosna, Hum, Zeta and Drina. Only a few scarce information from the Chronicle of Pop Dukljanin speak of the special political organization of Podgorje, but the former political individuality has left its mark on the ethnic and folklore characteristics of the population. In any case, at the time of its incorporation into the Bosnian state, Podgorje, as an administrative-political entity, no longer existed.

Formally, which means in terms of names and compactness of areas, some other regions of the Bosnian state were reminiscent of zemlja. These were in actuality a transitional forms between early feudal zemljas and "feudal areas", although by character and time they belong to developed feudalism. These are areas comprised 3-5 župas. They represented geographical and political entities and the existence of established names indicates a somewhat older age. Such were the areas of Drina in the upper basin of the river Drina, Podrinje in the area of the river Drinjača, and Završje, which encompassed the karst fields of today's southwestern Bosnia (Duvno, Livno, Glamoč and perhaps Grahovo). The Drina has been known since at least the 11th century, but it cannot be said when it was formed into a wider area of at least 4-5 župas. Herceg Stjepan Vukčić bore a title the Knez of Drina, and the ethnic term Drinjak for the inhabitants of this area in the Upper Drina is still in use (Podrinjac for middle and lower course of the Drina), clearly separating inhabitants of that region from the Bosnians or Hercegovinians. Podrinje also entered the title of Bosnian rulers, and in the feudal period, a specific feudal area of Trebotić-Dinjičić-Kovačević noble family was organized in this area.

== See also ==
- History of Balkans
- Land (administrative unit)

== Bibliography ==
- Anđelić, Pavao (1982). Studije o teritorijalnopolitičkoj organizaciji srednjovjekovne Bosne [Studies on the territorial-political organization of medieval Bosnia] (in Serbo-Croatian). Sarajevo: "Svjetlost," OOUR Izdavačka djelatnost. pp. 9–24. OCLC 1650228.
- Novakovi̇ć, Filip (15 June 2021). "The Medieval Bosnian State as an Elective Monarchy". Journal of Universal History Studies. 4 (1): 67–78. doi:10.38000/juhis.879213.
- Ćirković, Sima (2014) [1964]. "The Double Wreath: A Contribution to the History of Kingship in Bosnia". Balcanica (45): 107–143. doi:10.2298/BALC1445107C.
- Ćirković, Sima (2004). The Serbs. Malden: Blackwell Publishing. ISBN 978-1-4051-4291-5.
- Fine, John Van Antwerp Jr. (1991) [1983]. The Early Medieval Balkans: A Critical Survey from the Sixth to the Late Twelfth Century. Ann Arbor, Michigan: University of Michigan Press. ISBN 0-472-08149-7.
- Fine, John Van Antwerp Jr. (1994) [1987]. The Late Medieval Balkans: A Critical Survey from the Late Twelfth Century to the Ottoman Conquest. Ann Arbor, Michigan: University of Michigan Press. ISBN 0-472-08260-4.
- Moravcsik, Gyula, ed. (1967) [1949]. Constantine Porphyrogenitus: De Administrando Imperio (2nd revised ed.). Washington D.C.: Dumbarton Oaks Center for Byzantine Studies. ISBN 978-0-88402-021-9.
