= Sokograd (Pliva) =

Fortress in Bosnia and Herzegovina

Coordinates: 44°17′6.641″N 17°1′57.688″E

- Plivski grad
- Part of Banate and Kingdom of Bosnia
- Sokolac, Šipovo municipality, Bosnia and Herzegovina
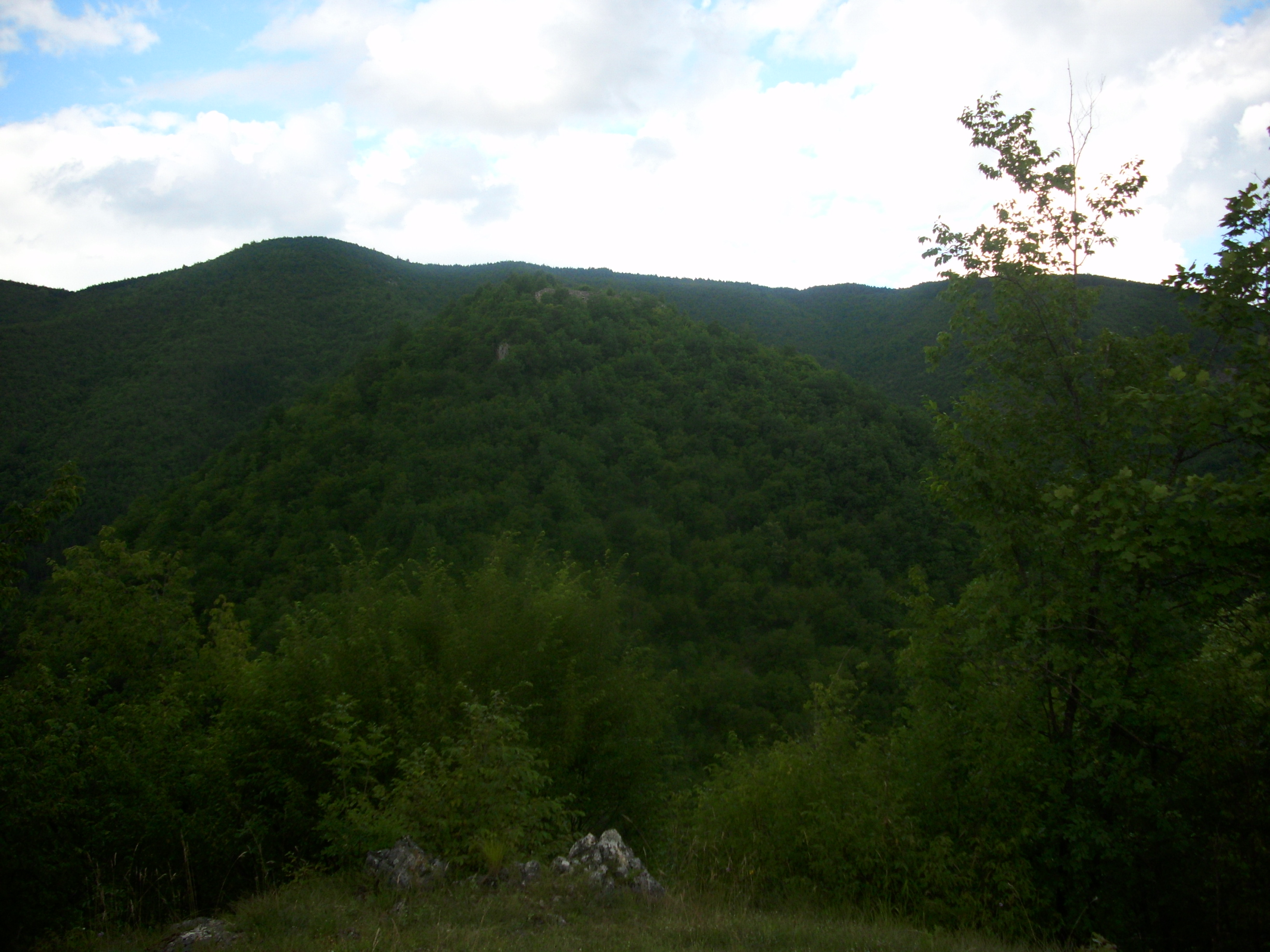

Site information
- Type: Castle (residential, fortification)
- Condition: ruin

Location
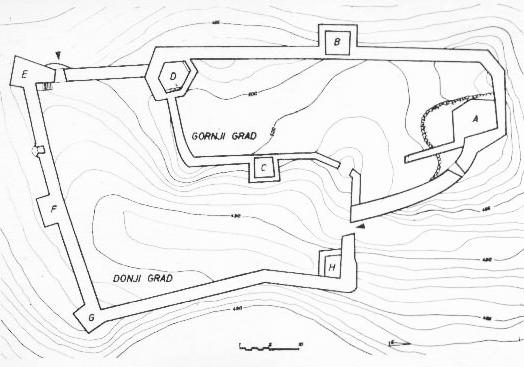
- Ground plan of the fortress
- Location within Bosnia and Herzegovina

Site history
- Built: 14th century
- Built by: multilayered
- Materials: Limestone
- Battles/wars: Battle of Sokograd (1463)

Garrison information
- Past commanders: Hrvoje Vukčić Hrvatinić

Sokograd is a medieval fortress with a castle town in the Pliva river valley in Šipovo municipality, Republika Srpska entity of Bosnia and Herzegovina. It was a very important fortress for the medieval Bosnian state, and the center of the župa Pliva (at the time also called Pljeva). It was built in a canyon on a steep slope high above the river Sokočnica, which flows into Pliva in Šipovo.

== Etymology ==
Sokograd derives from the Slavic word falcon (Sokol) and thus being a castle with castle town, it received the grad (transl. town) suffix. The fortress is also known as Pliva, Plivski grad, Pliva-Soko, Sokol-grad, Soko-grad, Sokolac, Soko or Sokol.

== Geography ==
Sokograd was a medieval castle and a castle town in the Pliva valley, within the settlement of Gerzovo, municipality of Mrkonjić Grad, at the border of municipality of Šipovo.

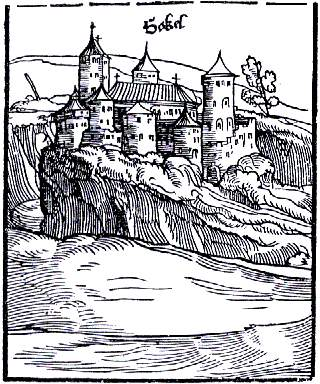
Sokograd in the 16th century

== History ==
Sokograd was probably built at the end of the first half of the 13th century when the first stronger fortresses began to be built in the then Banate of Bosnia. During his attack on Bosnia, King Lajos I of Hungary tried to capture it on 8 July 1363 but was prevented from doing so by the heroic defense of the city and they withdrew after three days of fighting. At the head of the defense was Knez Vukac Hrvatinić, father of more prominent Grand Duke of Bosnia, Hrvoje Vukčić Hrvatinić. Knez Vukac, on these merits, received the Sokograd with entire župa of Pliva from Ban Tvrtko, and was bestowed with a title of duke. The Hungarians tried again to capture the city in 1405 but were defeated again. The King of Bosnia, Stephen Tomašević, spent a short time in the fortress during the period in which the Kingdom of Bosnia collapsed under the Ottoman invasion, after which it was recaptured by the Kingdom of Hungary. During the battles between the Ottomans and the Hungarians in the second half of the 15th and the beginning of the 16th century, Sokograd was part of the Hungarian Jajce Banovina up until 1518–1521. The Ottomans finally occupied it in 1518, or in 1521. During the 16th century, it was mentioned as one of the 9 Vlach katun of Bosnia. Sokograd served the Ottoman Empire until 1833 when it was abandoned by Ottoman Garrisons. The Fortress along with the rest of Bosnia was incorporated into Austria-Hungary in 1878.

In an Ottoman defter there were 207 Christian households with 222 tabis along with 79 Muslim households along 90 tabis.

== Creation ==
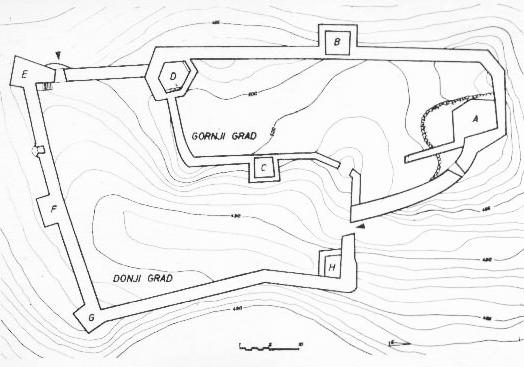
Map of the inner walls

In the beginning, Sokograd consisted only of the so-called fortified tower (A) with a small courtyard. The city was later expanded to today's Upper Town, to which the Lower Town was later added, after which the ramparts and towers were strengthened and adapted to the use of firearms. One of the last stages in the development of the fort was the construction of a tower on the other side of the Sokocnica canyon, which protected Sokograd from artillery attacks in the west. On the ramparts of the fort can be seen three layers of construction and development of the city, which characterize the state in which the fortress was located.

== Time periods ==
1. Banovina and Kingdom of Bosnia (from its establishment until 1463)
2. Hungary (from 1463 to 1521)
3. Ottoman Empire (from 1521 to 1833)
