= Sanica, Ključ =

Sanica Саница
- Village
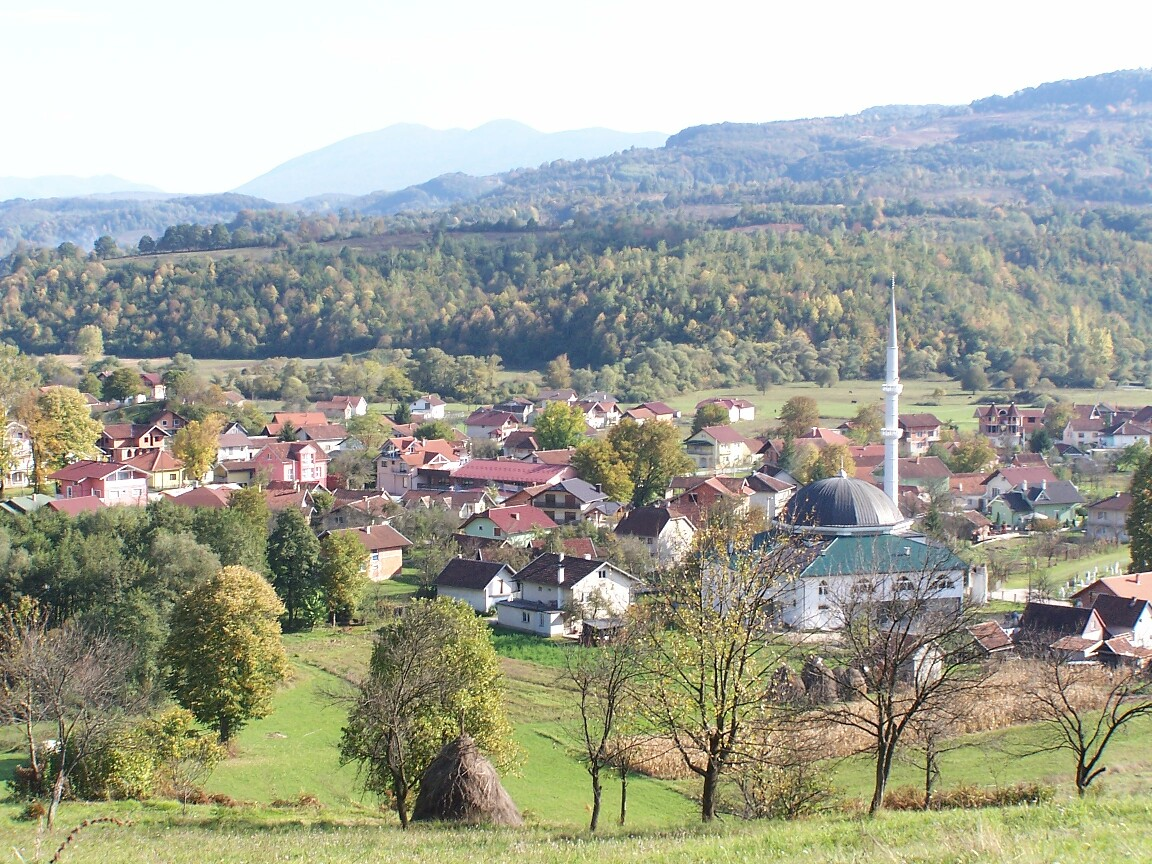
- View of Sanica, Bosnia and Hercegovina

- Location within Bosnia and Herzegovina
- Country: Bosnia and Herzegovina
- Entity: Federation of Bosnia and Herzegovina
- Canton: Una-Sana
- Municipality: Ključ

Area
  - Total: 3.71 sq mi (9.62 km^{2})

Population (2013)
  - Total: 1,337
  - Density: 360/sq mi (139/km^{2})
- Time zone: UTC+1 (CET)
  - Summer (DST): UTC+2 (CEST)
- Postal code: 79285

Sanica is a village in the municipality of Ključ, Bosnia and Herzegovina. In November 2013, a giant sinkhole abruptly began forming where a pond had been. The postal code is 79285.

== Demographics ==
According to the 2013 census, its population was 1,337.

Ethnicity in 2013
Ethnicity	Number	Percentage
Bosniaks	1,298	97.1%
Serbs	18	1.3%
Croats	5	0.4%
other/undeclared	16	1.2%
Total	1,337	100%

== Notable people ==
- Šerif Konjević (born 1958), Bosnian pop-folk singer, born in Sanica
