= Ferdo Šišić =

Croatian historian

- Born: 9 March 1869; Vinkovci, Kingdom of Croatia-Slavonia
- Died: 21 January 1940 (aged 70); Zagreb, Kingdom of Serbs, Croats and Slovenes
- Occupation: Historian

Ferdinand Maksimilijan pl. Šišić, known as Ferdo Šišić (Croatian pronunciation: [fěːrdo ʃǐːʃi͡ɕ], 9 March 1869 – 21 January 1940) was a Croatian historian, the founding figure of the Croatian historiography of the 20th century. He made his most important contributions in the area of the Croatian early Middle Ages.

== Life ==
Šišić was born in Vinkovci. After graduating from the comprehensive school in Zagreb in 1888, he studied at the Faculty of Philosophy at the University of Zagreb, earning a teacher's diploma in the summer of 1892. He worked as a teacher at high schools in Gospić from 1892 to 1893, Zagreb from 1893 to 1894, Osijek from 1894 to 1902 and again in Zagreb from 1902 to 1906.

Šišić continued his studies in Vienna, where he met individuals who informed his vocation, including Vatroslav Jagić. Šišić returned to Zagreb after the 6th semester and attended the lectures of Tadija Smičiklas and Tomislav Maretić.

In 1900 he obtained his Ph.D. at the Zagreb University with the work "Zadar and Venice from 1159 to 1247". In 1902 he earned his habilitation with the work "Miha Madijev de Barbezanis" and became the private assistant professor for Croatian history from the 12th to the 15th century (i.e. until 1409). He was suspended in 1908, but rehired in 1909 as a casual professor. In 1910 he became a member of the Yugoslav Academy of Sciences and Arts. He worked continually as a professor until the summer 1937/38 semester, before retiring due to a heart condition and to political conflicts among the students at Zagreb University. He died on 21 January 1940 in Zagreb.

== Historian ==
As a scientist, Šišić was primarily interested in the history of the early and high Middle Ages in Croatia. His greatest work is History of the Croats Under Home Rule. His most popular work is Overview of the History of the Croatian People, which was edited by Jaroslav Šidak and widely used for almost five decades. History of the Croats under the Arpad Kings (1102-1301), an unfinished compilation published after his death, is generally considered below the level of his magnum opus.

Other notable Šišić's books are the important monograph on Hrvoje Vukčić Hrvatinić and a critical edition of Dukljanin's Chronicles. His compilations of Croatian history of later periods (from the 15th to the 19th century) are not as valuable as his epochal history of the Croatian early Middle Ages. Particularly valuable is his handbook on the sources of Croatian history Priručnik izvora hrvatske historije, published in 1913, as well as the only presentation of Croatian historiography to date Hrvatska historiografija od XVI do XX stoljeća (published in Jugoslovenski istorijski časopis).

The work of Ferdo Šišić is characterized by a systematic, objective and informed approach. His opus, however, is the high point of "genetic history" or the archivist's approach, which patiently weaves the tapestry of the chosen period without engaging in speculations that are sometimes necessary to fill the gaps left open by archive materials. Also, Croatian historiography came to be dominated by the multidisciplinary approach combining demographics, culturology, history of economy and art only in the second half of the 20th century, putting Šišić in the position of a classic who laid inestimable foundations but cannot be the role model for contemporary historical science.

== Politician and archivist ==
Šišić was politically engaged as a member of the Croato-Serbian Coalition from 1908 to 1917. His biographers sometimes talk about Šišić's political inconstancy, material ambitions, weak character and opportunism. Šišić's political career however is not particularly significant. His lasting contribution to the Croatian culture and science is his gigantic and painstaking opus in historiography, including more than 450 works.

Another relevant aspect of his work is the personal library he built during his life, containing more than 20,000 titles (books, articles, historiography collections). When he died, those books became a valuable collection within the Croatian State Archives in Zagreb. As an expert archivist, Šišić diligently collected materials from numerous collections in Croatia, but also in Hungary, Austria, Britain, France, Italy, Belgium, Czech Republic and Slovakia.

== Works ==
- Hrvatski saborski spisi (Documents of the Croatian Parliament)
- Ljetopis popa Dukljanina (Dukljanin's Chronicles)
- Korespodencija Rački-Strossmayer (Correspondence between Rački and Strossmayer)
- Dokument o postanku Kraljevine SHS (Document on the Creation of the Kingdom of Serbs, Croats and Slovenes)
- Hrvatska povijest (Croatian History)
- Pregled povijesti hrvatskog naroda (Overview of the History of the Croatian People)
- Povijest Hrvata u vrijeme narodnih vladara (History of the Croats Under Home Rule), Zagreb, 1925
- Povijest Hrvata za kraljeva iz doma Arpadovića (1102.-1301.) (History of the Croats under the Arpad Kings (1102–1301), Zagreb, 1944

Assembly seats
| Preceded by | Member of Croatian Parliament for Vinkovci; 1908 – 1911 | Succeeded by |
