= Vukac Hrvatinić =

14th century Bosnian nobleman

Vukac Hrvatinić (fl. 1350 – d. after 10 April 1378) was a Bosnian magnate with the title of knez in the service of Ban Tvrtko Kotromanić of Bosnia, who elevated him to title of vojvoda (transl. duke) later on. He belonged to the Hrvatinić noble family which served the Banate of Bosnia.

== Life ==
Vukac was one of the sons of Hrvatin Stjepanić, the knez of Donji Kraji (1299). In 1363 Bosnia was invaded by the Hungarian King. The city of Soko on the Pliva river was defended by Vukac during Hungarian's siege between 8–10 July 1363. Vukac defended it so effectively that the King decided to abandon a siege after just few days and retreated to Hungary.Ban Tvrtko awarded Vukac with entire župa of Pliva, to adjoin it to Donji Kraji, and elevated him to a title of duke.

== Issue ==
Vukac had four sons:

- Hrvoje (1350–1416), Grand Duke of Bosnia, Knez of Donji Kraji, and Herceg of Split.
- Vuk, Ban of Croatia.
- Dragiša.
- Vojislav.

== Sources ==
- Ferdo Šišić (1902). Vojvoda Hrvoje Vukčić Hrvatinić i njegovo doba. (1350-1416): s jednim tlorisom i zemljovidom te s četiri redoslovne table. Izdanje "Matice hrvatske".
- Klaić, Vjekoslav (1899). Povjest Hrvata: od najstarijih vremena do svršetka xix. stoljeća. Tisak i naklada knjižare L. Hartmana.
