= Hrvoje Vukčić Hrvatinić =

14th-century Bosnian nobleman

Gospodin Hrvoje Vukčić Hrvatinić
- Grand Duke of Bosnia, Knez of Donji Kraji, Herzog of Split
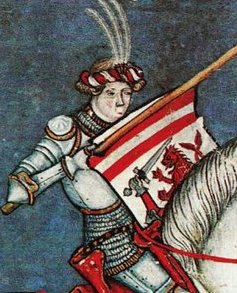
- Cover sheet depiction of Hrvoje Vukčić in Hrvoje's Missal manuscript (1404) Cover sheet depiction of Hrvoje Vukčić Hrvatinić in Hrvoje's Missal manuscript (1407)

Grand Duke of Bosnia
- Reign: 1380-1416
- Predecessor: Hrana Vuković
- Successor: Vlatko Vuković (tenure overlapped), Sandalj Hranić
- Full name: Hrvoje Vukčić Hrvatinić
- Born: 1350; Kotor
- Died: 1416 (aged 65–66)
- Noble family: Hrvatinić
- Spouse: Jelena Nelipčić
- Issue: Balša Hercegović
- Father: Vukac Hrvatinić

Hrvoje Vukčić Hrvatinić (c. 1350–1416) was a medieval Bosnian nobleman and magnate, Grand Duke of Bosnia, Knez of Donji Kraji, and Duke of Split. He was the most prominent member of the Hrvatinić noble family, and one of the major feudal lords in Kingdom of Bosnia. He was Grand Duke of Bosnia under four Bosnian kings: King Tvrtko I, King Stephen Dabiša, King Stephen Ostoja and King Tvrtko II. In 1403, and after Tvrtko I's death, Ladislaus of Naples named him his deputy for Dalmatia, and bestowed him with a title Duke of Split, later Herzog of Split. He played a crucial role in the dynastic struggles between the Anjou and Luxembourg claimants to the Hungarian-Croatian throne at the end of the 14th century, as well as in the emergence of the Bosnian Kingdom as a regional power during the same period.

== Rise to power ==
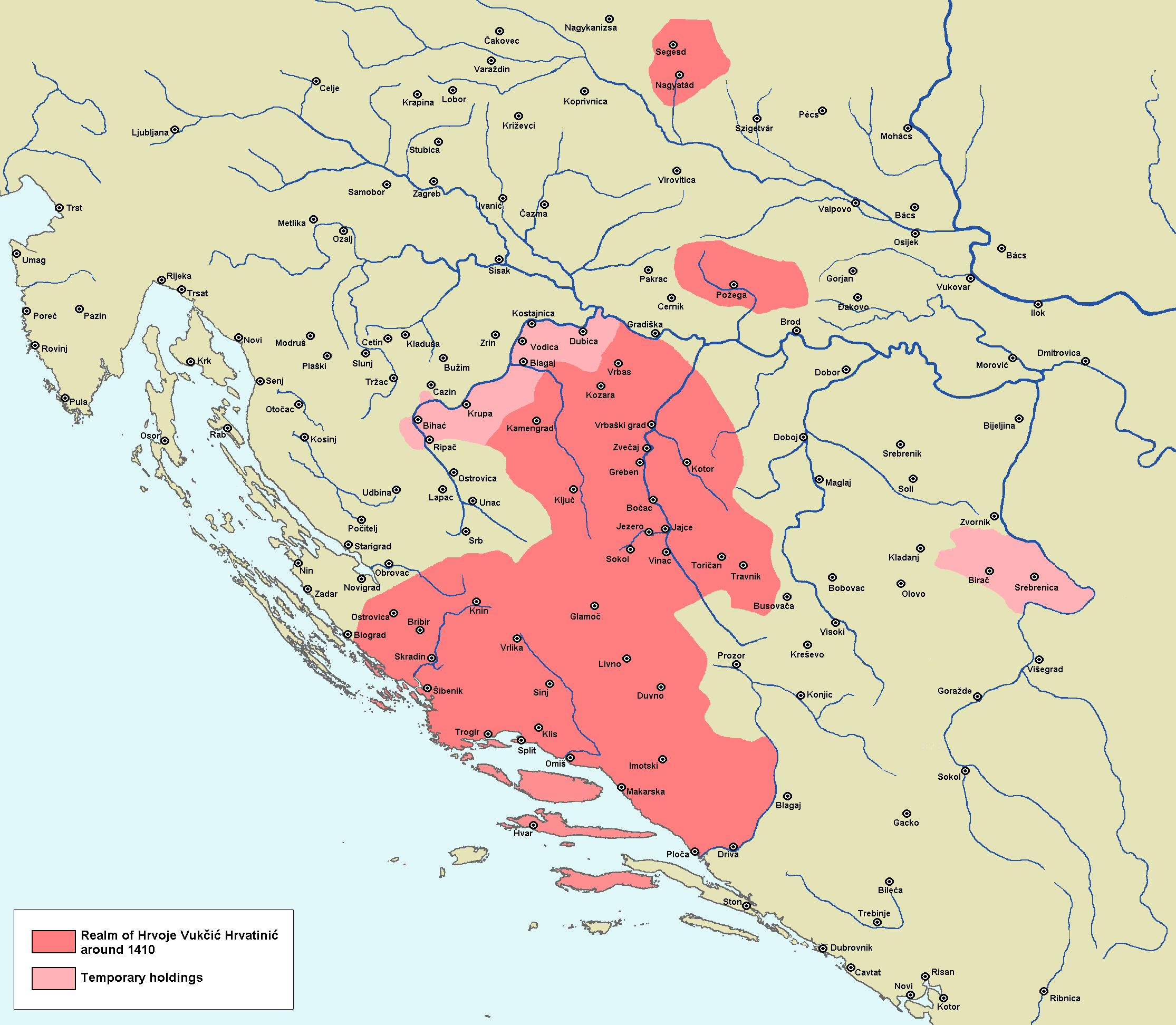
Realm of Hrvoje Vukčić in the early 15th century

In the year 1380 he was made Grand Duke of Bosnia by Bosnian King Stjepan (Stephen) Tvrtko I of House of Kotromanić, granting him a seat in Lašva. In 1387 Hrvoje's first action as Grand Duke was leading a squadron of Bosnian troops to Croatia to raise the siege of Bishop Ivan Horvat in Zagreb. After the death of king Louis I he participated in the battles of succession between Sigismund of Luxembourg and Ladislaus of Naples. He sided with Ladislaus with the promise of becoming ban of Croatia and Dalmatia in 1391. During the reign of King Stephen Dabiša of Bosnia, he participated in the fights against the Ottoman Turks in Bosnia in 1392 - earning Dabiša's eternal gratitude. Hrvoje became Dabiša's main guarantee of staying at the throne - as he declared that he is a faithful servant of the Hungarian King in all cases but those that might damage King Dabiša in 1393. In the heat of internal struggles in Bosnia in 1397 during the reign of Queen Jelena Gruba Hrvoje invited the Ottomans to offer assistance. As an opposer of Queen Jelena, he participated in the selection of Stephen Ostoja as the new King of Bosnia in May 1398. Opposing King Sigismund's Hungarian pretensions, Hrvoje greatly influenced King Ostoja.

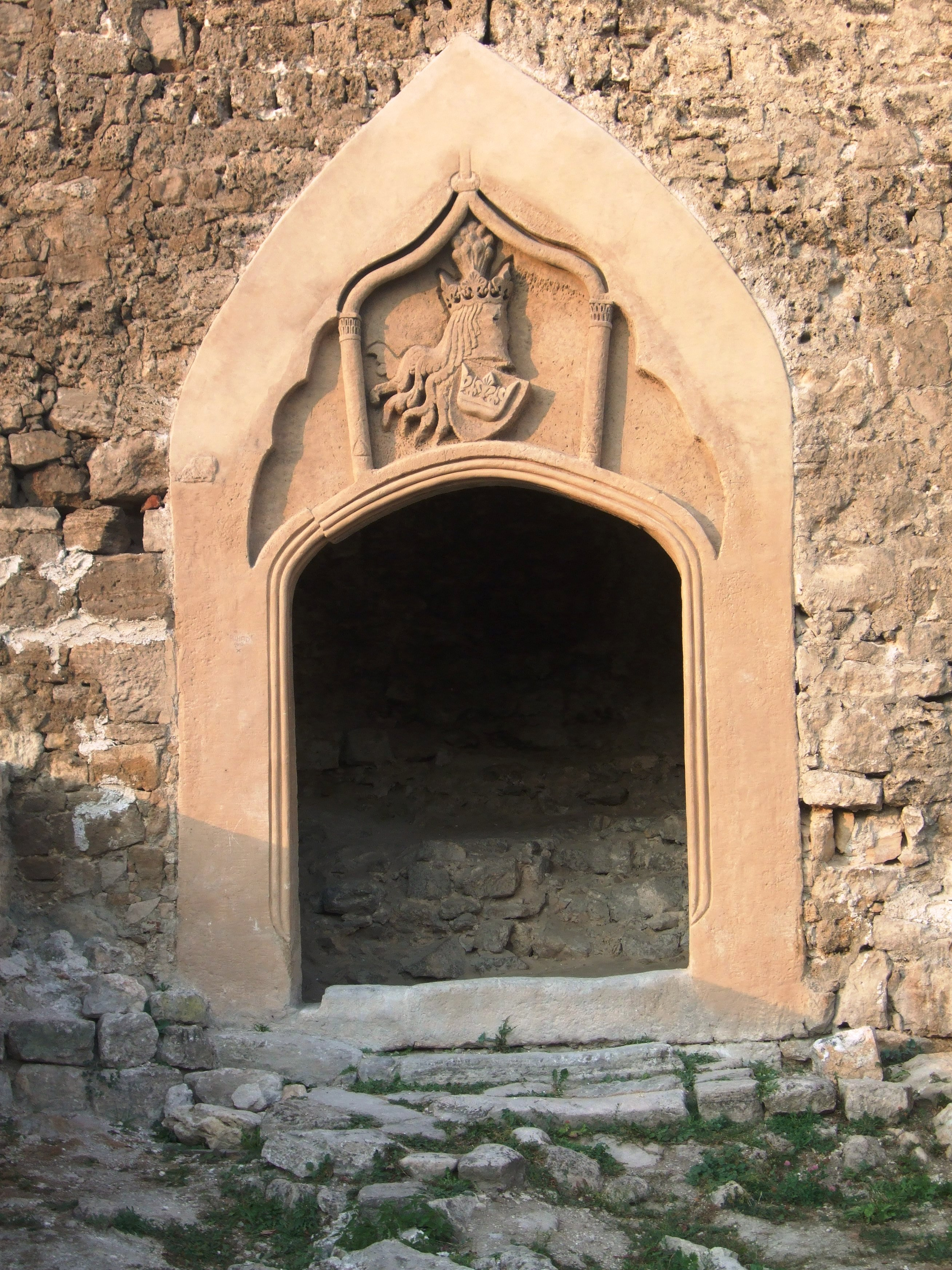
Jajce fortress, seat of Hrvoje Vukčić Hrvatinić, southwest entrance with the Kingdom of Bosnia coat of arms

Duke Hrvoje opposed King Sigismund's rule in Bosnia and actively worked to bring Ladislaus of Naples as the new King of Hungary - that would leave Bosnia alone since 1389, and the same year King Sigismund invaded Bosnia. Duke Hrvoje defeated his forces before they reached the City of Vrbas and chased them across the river Una, invading and conquering the župa of Dubica. King Sigismund counterattacked in the fall by assaulting Bosnia. Here, Duke Hrvoje led the forces for King Stephen Ostoja, together with Duke Sandalj Hranić and Duke Pavle Radenović. By the end of 1402, Duke Hrvoje made all Dalmatian cities with the exception of Dubrovnik to recognize King Ladislaus' rule.

After the crowning of Ladislaus as the Croatian-Hungarian King in Zadar in 1403, and in political maneuvering against his arch political rival and enemy, the King Sigismund, he made Hrvoje his deputy for Dalmatia territory, as promised, calling him his Vicar General for the regions of Sclavonia (in partibus Sclavonie). He was also named Duke of Split, and given possessions on the islands of Brač, Hvar and Korčula. From then on he carried the title of "Grand Duke of Bosnia and Knez of Donji Kraji, Duke of Split, regent of Dalmatia and Croatia", or as title visible on coins duke was able to mint in Split read in Latin: Dux Spaleti, Dalmatie Croatieque regius viceregens ac Bosne supremus vojvoda. In 1406 Hrvoje Vukčić Hrvatinić fortified and strengthened Prozor Fortress over the Vrlika valley in Croatia, also given to him by Ladislaus of Naples.

He continually exerted his influence over Bosnia affairs. He came into conflict with King Ostoja and participated in the plot to remove him from the throne and replacing him with Tvrtko II Kotromanić in 1404. Together with Tvrtko II he formed a movement against Hungary and Sigismund of Luxembourg. After Sigismund's military intervention in 1408 and the massacre of the Bosnian army, he allied himself with Sigismund. However, Hungary's victory in Bosnia and the retaking of the throne by King Ostoja weakened him severely. He soon lost control over the islands he had been given, as well as Split. At this point, he sought help from the Ottoman Empire. The Hungarian army was defeated at Lašva in 1415, but this would open the door to Ottoman expansion into Bosnia. Hrvoje died the following year and was buried in the crypt of a his private underground chapel, located in the southern quarter within the walls of Jajce. His widow, Jelena Nelipčić, re-married to King Ostoja.

== Family Connections ==
Hrvoje was the eldest son of Duke Vukac Hrvatinić. He had three brothers: Vuk (who was Ban of Croatia), Dragiša and Vojislav, and a sister, Resa Vukčić, who was married to Batalo Šantić . He was married to Jelena Nelipčić, granddaughter of the powerful Croatian noble Ivan I Nelipac (Prince Nelipić) and sister of Ivan III Nelipac (Ivaniš Nelipić). He is first mentioned in 1376 as being prince and knight during the reign of Hungarian king Louis I. The territories over which he reigned were the Donji Kraji (transl. Lower Edges) in Medieval Bosnia, facing Croatia and Slavonia westwards.

=== Hrvoje's coat of arms ===
There exist several variations of his coat of arms which had with the title of herceg. The family signature symbol was an arm brandishing a sword, but its position on the coat of arms (shield and crest) changed depending on his alliance with Ladislaus of Anjou (addition of golden fleur-de-lis and crosses, blue bend, and silver color of the shield), and Sigismund of Luxembourg (addition of a Roude Léiw, and two red Árpád stripes with white color of the shield). In the Illyrian armorials (16th century) there's another variation of his coat of arms with the Anjou showcasing a wrong combination of colors, and wrongly identified as the coat of arms of the family.

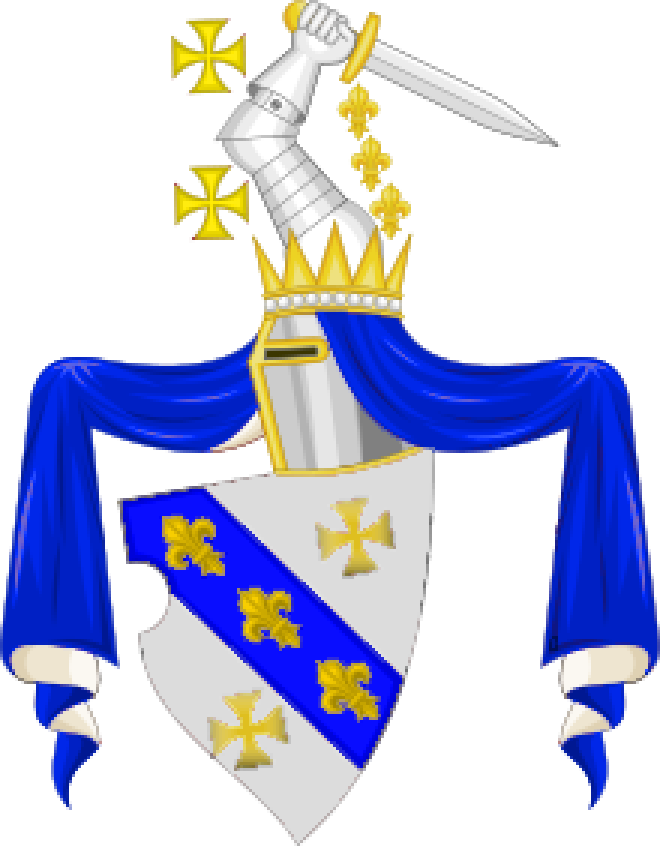
Hrvoje's herceg's coat of arms received with the title from Ladislaus of Anjou.

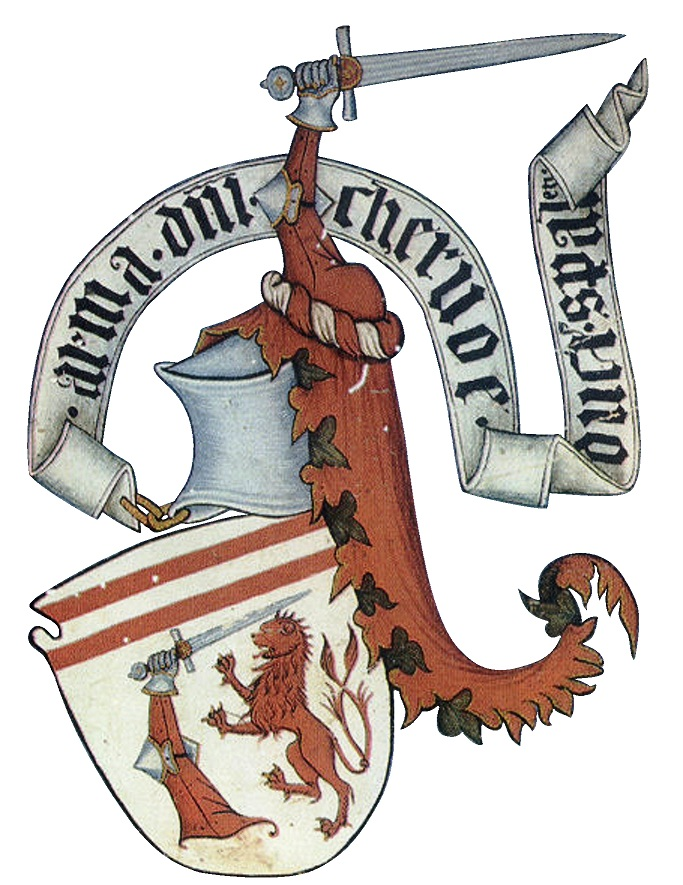
Hrvoje's herceg's coat of arms (as depicted in Hrvoje's Missal) received from Sigismund of Luxembourg.

== Hrvoje's Misal ==
During this time the Hval Manuscript and Hrvoje's Missal were written in Bosnian cyrillic and Glagolitic alphabets, respectively. The Hval Manuscript is now kept at the University of Bologna while Hrvoje's Missal is kept at the Topkapı Palace Museum Manuscript Library in Istanbul).

== See also ==
- Hrvoje's Missal
- Prozor Fortress

== Sources ==
- Ančić, Mladen (1997). Putanja klatna: Ugarsko-hrvatsko kraljevstvo i Bosna u 14. stoljeću. Acad. Scientiarum et Artium Croatica. ISBN 978-953-154-308-8.
- Fine, John V. A. Jr. (1975). The Bosnian Church: a New Interpretation: a Study of the Bosnian Church and Its Place in State and Society from the 13th to the 15th Centuries. East European Quarterly. ISBN 978-0-914710-03-5.
- Fine, John V. A. Jr. (1994). The Late Medieval Balkans: A Critical Survey from the Late Twelfth Century to the Ottoman Conquest. Ann Arbor: University of Michigan Press. ISBN 978-0-472-08260-5.
- Fine, John V. A. (Jr ) (2010). When Ethnicity Did Not Matter in the Balkans: A Study of Identity in Pre-Nationalist Croatia, Dalmatia, and Slavonia in the Medieval and Early-Modern Periods. University of Michigan Press. p. 127. ISBN 978-0-472-02560-2. "Ladislav of Naples, who in the first years of the fifteenth century laid claim to the Hungarian throne, made Hrvoje his deputy for this Dalmatian territory, calling him his Vicar General for the regions of Slavonia (in partibus Sclavonie). Thus, like Venice, the Neapolitans still considered the region simply "Slavonia," and Hrvoje seems to have had no objections to the nomenclature."
- Klaić, Nada (1989). Srednjovjekovna Bosna: politički položaj bosanskih vladara do Tvrtkove krunidbe, 1377. g. Grafički zavod Hrvatske. ISBN 978-86-399-0104-2.
- Lovrenović, Dubravko (28 September 1987). "Jelena Nelipčić, splitska vojvotkinja i bosanska kraljica". Radovi Zavoda za hrvatsku povijest (in Croatian). 20 (1). Zagreb: Filozofski fakultet Sveučilišta u Zagrebu: 183–193. ISSN 0353-295X.
- Lovrenović, Dubravko (1987a). "HRVOJE VUKČIĆ HRVATINIĆ I SPLITSKA KOMUNA 1403-1413". Prilozi (in Bosnian) (23): 37–45. ISSN 0350-1159.
- Lovrenović, Dubravko (2000). "VITEZ, HERCEG I PATAREN (IDEOLOŠKI STEREOTIPI I ŽIVOTNA STVARNOST)". Forum Bosnae (in Bosnian) (07–08): 257–294. ISSN 1512-5122.
- Sulejmanagić, Amer (30 November 2012). "Novac Hrvoja Vukčića Hrvatinića" [Coins minted by Duke Hrvoja Vukčića Hrvatinića]. Numizmatičke Vijesti (in Serbo-Croatian). 54 (65): 54–85. ISSN 0546-9422.
- Sulejmanagić, Amer (23 July 2015). "Grbovi Vukčića Hrvatinića". Povijesni Prilozi (in Bosnian and Croatian). 48 (48). hrčak - portal hrvatskih znanstvenih časopisa: 33–68. ISSN 0351-9767.
- Šišić, Ferdo (1902). Vojvoda Hrvoje Vukčić Hrvatinić i njegovo doba. (1350-1416): s jednim tlorisom i zemljovidom te s četiri redoslovne table. Izdanje "Matice hrvatske".

Military offices
Preceded by Hrana Vuković	Grand Duke of Bosnia; 1380–1388; 1392-1416	Succeeded by Vlatko Vuković
