= List of medieval Bosnian manuscripts =

The List of Medieval Bosnian manuscripts encompasses a corpus of Medieval Bosnian literature, including Bosnian Church codices, written in vernacular Bosnian (Folk language, Slavic), Old Church Slavonic, using Bosnian Cyrillic, and/or Glagolitic scripts.

== Historical background ==
There are thirteen four-gospels, four apostles and three codices, complete and less complete, created in the bosom of the Bosnian Church preserved to this day.
Also a number of fragments, among which the oldest Grigorovic-Giljferding's Gospel fragment from the 13th century, two older ones Glagolitic fragments of the apostles from the end of the 12th century, Gršković and Mihanovičev, which are considered to originate from Bosnia.
Glagolitic is associated with Bosnian Split missal fragment from the beginning of the 13th century, prepared for the faithful in Bosnia (the text contains some errors and words confirmed only in Bosnian Cyrillic texts, with ikavian jat). Fragments from Monteprandon in Italy according to the latest research (S. Graciotti) are the treatises for and against the faith of Bosnian Christians (in the vernacular).
Fragments of a "parimejnik" (liturgical booklet) from the late 13th and early 14th centuries (Kiev, Central Scientific Library of the Ukrainian Academy of Sciences, 4 sheets) could be of Bosnian origin, but it has not been determined whether their origin should be linked to the Bosnian Church, according to Herta Kuna (Kuna 1970: 98).
Research has shown that the number of manuscripts of the Bosnian Church was considerably higher than is known today. With the disappearance of the Bosnian Church, its manuscripts ceased to be in use. However, some managed to survive because they were adapted to the liturgy of the Serbian Orthodox Church (gospels: Divoš, Nikoljsko, Kopitar, Pripković, Vrutočko); some manuscripts have disappeared forever (Daničić and Belgrade Third Gospels burned down with the National Library of Belgrade on April 6, 1941, during the bombing of the city); some have been lost (Srećković Gospel). The Nikoljsko Gospel was lost and unknown for a long time, because it disappeared together with some fifty of other important books, manuscripts and charters from the old collection of the National Library of Belgrade, or were destroyed during the First World War.

== List ==
List of medieval Bosnian manuscripts
Name	Contents	Date	Library	Signature	Folia	Scans	Sources
Batalovo jevanđelje							
Belićevi listići							
Beogradski apostol							
Treće beogradsko jevanđelje							
Bosanski kijevski odlomak parimejnika							
Čajničko tetraevanđelje,		late 14th c. or beginning of the 15th c.					
Daničićevo tetraevanđelje	variants according to Daničić's edition	14/15th c.					
Divoševo tetraevanđelje		1st or 2nd quarter of the 14th c					
Dovoljsko tetraevanđelje,		end of the 14th beginning of the 15th c. (Jevanđelje iz Dovolje 14/15. st.)					
Excerpt from Gilferding's Apostle (Odlomak Giljferdingovog apostola)							
Guilferding Apostol 14	apostol (missing beginning and end)	1300s (first half?)	National Library of Russia	RU-SpRNB Гильф. 14	302	NLR	
Q.п.I.26 (Note: On linguistic grounds, this manuscript has been proposed by several authors since Lavrov in 1914 to have originated in Bosnia. This was followed by Granström in 1953, Šidak in 1967 and recently by Kuna, Vyalova and Vakareliyska, but remains a minority assessment. The majority of scholars more cautiously classify it as Serbian sensu stricto.)	gospel (short aprakos), fragmentary	1200s/1300s (pre-1346)	National Library of Russia	RU-SpRNB Q.п.I.26	160	NLR	
Grigorovič-Giljferdingovi gospel fragments (8 leaves),		13. century					
Grškovićev odlomak apostola	fragment of apostol						
Hrvojev misal							
Hvalovo tetraevanđelje (integral part of the Hvalov zbornik)		1404					
Hvalov zbornik		1404					
Kopitarovo tetraevanđelje		14/15. century					
Manojlovo tetraevanđelje							
Manojlovo (Mostarsko) jevanđelje		beginning of the 14th century					
Mihanovićev odlomak apostola							
Mletačko tetraevanđelje (integral part of the Mletački zbornik)		14/15. century					
Mletački zbornik							
Monteprandon Leaves							
Nikoljsko evanđelje / Nikoljsko tetraevanđelje		14/15. century					
Pantelejmonov apostol							
Pripkovićevo tetraevanđelje		14/15. century					
Radosavljev zbornik							
Bosnian Sofia Gospels							
Sofijsko tetraevanđelje		2nd half of the 14th century or early 15th century.					
Splitski odlomak glagoljskog misala							
Srećkovićevo tetraevanđelje		14th century					
Vatikansko jevanđelje							
Vrutočko tetraevanđelje		end of the 14th century					

== Bibliography ==
- Беляева, Н.В. (2019). "Бессоюзные имплицитные конструкции в русских эпических песнях". Ученые записки: электронный научный журнал (in Russian). 35 (4). ISSN 2074-1774.
- Буслаев, Фёдор Иванович (1884). "Славянскій и восточный орнаментъ по рукописямъ древнeго и новаго времени. Собралъ и исслѣдоваль Владиміръ Стасовъ". Журналъ Министерства народнаго просвѣщенія (in Russian). 233 (5): 54–104. Review.
- Буслаев, Фёдор Иванович (1917). Историческіе очерки по русскому орнаменту въ рукописяхъ (in Russian). Petersburg: Типография Академии наук.
- Буслаев, Фёдор Иванович (1930). Сочинения Ф.И. Буслаева (in Russian). Vol. 3. Leningrad: Академия наук СССР.
- Ђурић, Војислав Ј.; Бабић-Ђорђевић, Гордана (1997). Српска уметност у средњем веку (in Serbian). Vol. 2. ISBN 86-379-0663-X.
- Ефимова, Валерия Сергеевна (2021). Пути формирования старославянского лексического фонда (in Russian). Moscow: Институт славяноведения РАН. ISBN 978-5-7576-0448-0.
- Ефимова, Валерия Сергеевна (2022). "Номинации лиц существительными и субстантивированными причастиями в языке переводов ΙΧ – Χ вв." [Nominations of Persons through Nouns and Substantivized Participles in the Language of Translations of the 9th – 10th Centuries] (PDF). Палеославистика-4. Славянское и балканское языкознание (in Russian). Vol. 22. Институт славяноведения РАН. pp. 377–391. doi:10.31168/2658-3372.2022.22.20. ISBN 978-5-7576-0467-1. ISSN 2658-3372.
- FB (2021). "Sanktpeterburški bosanski Apostol (РНБ Гильф. 14)" [St. Petersburg Bosnian Apostle (RNB Gilf. 14)]. Forum Bosnae (in Serbo-Croatian) (93–94): 19–322. ISSN 1512-5122.
- Горина, Наталия Людвиговна (1996). "Опыт оценки текстологической значимости разночтений: (на материале списков славянского Евангелия XI—XV вв.)". Труды Отдела древнерусской литературы (in Russian). 49: 323–338. ISSN 0130-464X.
- Kardaš, Mehmed (2014). "O jezičkim i grafijskim odlikama Sofijskog bosanskog evanđelja" [About linguistic and graphic qualities of Sofia Bosnian Gospel]. Forum Bosnae (in Serbo-Croatian) (66): 138–149. ISSN 1512-5122.
- Kardaš, Mehmed (2018). Jezik i grafija Kopitarova četveroevanđelja u kontekstu bosanske crkvenoslavenske pismenosti [Language and orthography of Kopitar’s gospel in the context of the Bosnian Church Slavonic literacy] (in Serbo-Croatian). Zagreb: Filozofski fakultet Sveučilišta u Zagebu.
- Knoll, Vladislav (2019). "Changes in Church Slavonic in the 14th–15th Centuries (2019)". Slavia: časopis pro slovanskou filologii. 89 (3): 254–279. ISSN 0037-6736.
- Kuna, Herta (2008). Srednjovjekovna bosanska književnost [Medieval Bosnian literature] (in Bosnian). International Forum Bosnae. ISSN 1512-5122.
  - Partly added to article (excerpt further)
- Лавров, Пётр Алексеевич (1905). Палеографическіе снимки съ юго-славянскихъ рукописей болгарскаго и сербскаго письма. Энциклопедія славянской филологіи (in Russian). Vol. 4, 1. Petersburg: Санкт-Петербургский археологический институт.
- Лавров, Пётр Алексеевич (1914). Палеографическое обозрѣніе кирилловского письма. Энциклопедія славянской филологіи (in Russian). Vol. 4, 1. Petersburg: Отделение русского языка и словесности Императорской Академии наук.
- Лавров, Пётр Алексеевич (1916). Альбомъ снимковъ съ юго-славянскихъ рукописей болгарскаго и сербскаго письма. Энциклопедія славянской филологіи (in Russian). Vol. Supplement to 4, 1–4, 2. Petersburg: Отделение русского языка и словесности Императорской Академии наук.
- Mareš, František Václav (1984). "Раннее свидетельство теории о скифском происхождении славян на Руси и на Балканах". Cyrillomethodianum (in Russian) (8–9): 37–47. ISSN 1010-2892.
- Metzger, Bruce Manning (1977). The Early Versions Of The New Testament: Their Origin, Transmission, and Limitations. Oxford: Clarendon Press. ISBN 0-19-826170-5 (2001 reprint).
- Nazor, Anica (2005). "Rukopisi Crkve bosanske" [Manuscripts of the Bosnian Church]. In Šanjek, Franjo (ed.). Fenomen "Krstjani" u srednjovjekovnoj Bosni i Humu [The Phenomenon of the "Krstjani" (Christians) in Medieval Bosnia and Hum] (PDF) (in Serbo-Croatian). Sarajevo: Institut za istoriju. pp. 539–562. ISBN 9985-9642-5-X.
- Новак, Мария Олеговна (2004). ""Необходимое" и "прекрасное" в славяно-русском переводе Апостола: Динамика семантических изменений" (PDF). Древняя Русь (in Russian). 15 (1): 81–86. eISSN 2071-9590.
- Новак, Мария Олеговна (2011). "Расширение текста в славяно-русском Апостоле: попытка интерпретации". Языковые категории и единицы: синтагматический аспект: Материалы девятой международной конференции (Владимир, 22–24 сентября 2011 года) (in Russian). Vladimir. pp. 335–339.
- Новак, Мария Олеговна (2014). "Апостол" в истории русского литературного языка (Thesis) (in Russian). Kazan: Казанский (Приволжский) федеральный университет.
- Павлов, Иннокентий (1987). "Пролог Евангелия от Иоанна (1. 1–18) в славянском переводе" [Introduction of the Gospel of John (I. 1–18) in the Slavonic translation]. Palaeobulgarica (in Russian) (4): 3–17. ISSN 0204-4021.
- Пентковский, Алексей Мстиславович (2019). "Славянский перевод Евангелия и его использование в богослужении в IX (посл. треть) - XI вв.". Наслеђе и стварање Свети Ћирило, Свети Сава: 869 -1219 - 2019 (PDF) (in Russian). Vol. 1. Belgrade: Иститут за спрски језик САНУ. pp. 73–152. ISBN 978-86-82873-70-9.
- Pilát, Štefan (2018). "Projekt GORAZD – problematika digitalizace staroslověnských slovníků" (PDF). Ѡбщежитїе: The World Wide Web portal for the study of Cyrillic and Glagolitic manuscripts and early printed books. Archived from the original (PDF) on 2018-08-20.
- Сперанский, Михаил Несторович (1899). "Отчет о тридцать девятом присуждении наград графа Уварова". Записки Императорской академии наук, Серия 8 (in Russian). 3 (5): 27–151. Review.
- Станојловић, Јована (2023). "Ликовно обликовање српских књига у време владавине краља Милутина". Свети краљ Милутин и његово доба: историја, књижевност, уметност [Art Design of Serbian Books During the Reign of King Milutin] (in Serbian). pp. 367–395. doi:10.46793/6008-065-5.367S.
- Стародубцев, Татјана A. (2020). "Који је Свети Сава приказан у Призренском јеванђељу?" [Which Saint Sabas was Represented in the Prizren Gospel?] (PDF). Саопштења (in Serbian). 52: 101–115. ISSN 0354-4346.
- Стасов, Владимир Васильевич (1997). Славянскій и восточный орнаментъ по рукописямъ древнeго и новаго времени (in Russian). Vol. 1. Saint Petersburg: А. А. Ильин.
- Шмидт, Сигурд Оттович, ed. (2002). XIV век: Апокалипсис – Летопись Лаврентьевская. Сводный каталог славяно-русских рукописных книг, хранящихся в России, странах СНГ и Балтии (in Russian). Vol. 1. Moscow: Индрик. ISBN 5-85759-167-8.
- Vakareliyska, Cynthia (2023). "The 25 September Commemoration of Martyr Romanus in Slavic Menologies". Старобългарска литература (67–68): 81–106. eISSN 2535-0919.
- Veispahić, Fatima (2021). "Predgovor" [Foreword]. Forum Bosnae (in Serbo-Croatian) (93–94): 5–18. ISSN 1512-5122.
- Воскресенский, Григорий Александрович (1892). Древне-славянскій Апостолъ (in Russian). Vol. 1. Sergiyev Posad: Александр Иванович Снегирёв.
- Воскресенский, Григорий Александрович (1894). Евангеліе отъ Марка по основнымъ спискамъ четырехъ редакцій рукописнаго славянскаго Евангельскаго текста съ разночтеніямии изъ ста восьми рукописей Евангелія XI-XVI вв (in Russian). Sergiyev Posad: Александр Иванович Снегирёв.
- Воскресенский, Григорий Александрович (1896). Характеристическія черты четырехъ редакцій славянскаго перевода Евангелія от Марка по сто двѣнадцати рукописямъ Евангелія XI-XVI вв (in Russian). Moscow: Университетская типография.
- Воскресенский, Григорий Александрович (1906). Древне-славянскій Апостолъ (in Russian). Vol. 2. Sergiyev Posad: Александр Иванович Снегирёв.
- Воскресенский, Григорий Александрович (1908). Древне-славянскій Апостолъ (in Russian). Vol. 3–5. Sergiyev Posad: Александр Иванович Снегирёв.
