= Matija Divković =

Bosnian Franciscan and writer

- Born: 1563; Jelaške between Vareš and Olovo, Sanjak of Bosnia, Ottoman Empire
- Died: 21 August 1631 (aged 67–68); Olovo, Sanjak of Bosnia, Ottoman Empire
- Occupations: Catholic priest, writer

Matija Divković (1563 – 21 August 1631) was a Bosnian Franciscan and writer. He is considered to be the founding father of the Bosnia and Herzegovina literature.

== Life ==
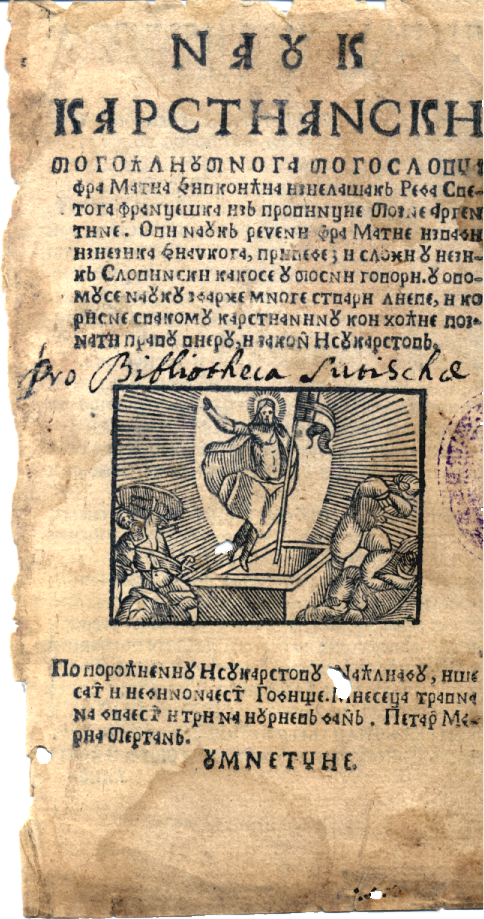
Divković's Nauk krstjanski, Venice, 1611

Not much is known of Divković's life. He was born in Jelaške near Olovo in the then-Eyalet of Bosnia. He probably joined the Franciscans in the nearest monastery in Olovo and was schooled there. He continued his studies in Italy, but then returned to Bosnia to work there. In 1609 he was a chaplain in Sarajevo. It is plausible that he also performed other duties, since the monasteries of that age usually had schools. It was there that Divković wrote his first work, Christian Doctrine for the Slavic People, and started to translate One Hundred Miracles or Signs of the Blessed and Glorious Virgin. In 1611 Matija Divković traveled to the Republic of Venice, where he first had the Cyrillic letters molded, and then printed both works.

In 1612, Divković came to the monastery of Kreševo and started writing his greatest and most important book, Divković's Words on Sunday Gospel All Year Round, completed in Olovo (1614). It was printed in Bosnian Cyrillic that he referred to as 'Serbian letters' in Venice 1616 (2nd edition in 1704), as well as Christian Doctrine with Many Spiritual Matters (1616, several later editions).

Matija Divković published his works with the advice and support of Bartul Kačić-Žarković, bishop of Makarska (1615–1645), who managed some parishes in Bosnia. There were also links between Bosnian Franciscans and the Franciscan monasteries around Makarska (Živogošće, Zaostrog, Makarska). Nothing else is known about Divković's life.

He died in Olovo on 21 August 1631.

== Critical assessment and analysis ==
=== Assessment of works ===
Divković wrote his books to meet the needs of the Catholic folk. Veliki nauk (transl. Greater Doctrine – transl. Greater Christian Doctrine) from 1611 was intended for clerics, while Mali nauk (transl. Lesser Doctrine – transl. Lesser Christian Doctrine) from 1616 became a textbook for the people. The former is made up of several unidentified Latin works (the sermons of John Herolt, Bernardine Bastio, etc.). The latter looks like a dialog between a teacher and a student, mixing verses and prose, with various religious and educational themes. Mali nauk (transl. Lesser Doctrine) was one of the most popular books in Bosnia and Herzegovina and widely used in neighboring Dalmatia.

Mali nauk had as many as eight editions. Divković had its content "made into one from Ledezmo's and Bellarmino's learning". More precisely, Divković used the translation of the catechism of James Ledezmo (1578), the Italian original of Roberto Bellarmino and the translation of his book by A. Komulović. Mali nauk includes the Tears of the Blessed Virgin Mary in eight-syllable verses, written as a variation on the "crying" literature from the age of glagolitic literature. Verses on Abraham and Isaac are a paraphrase of the Abraham of Mavro Vetranović; the life of St Catherine, also in verses, is a paraphrase of an older peoples legend.

One Hundred Miracles… is a loose translation of the medieval legends of John Herolt (Promptuarium discipuli de miraculis B. M. Virginis, Venice, 1598). Words... is a collection of sermons for priests and nuns, mostly after the collections of Herolt (Sermones discipuli de tempore et de Sanctis) and some other Catholic authors.

=== Analysis ===
Matija Divković is distinguished with the historical title of the founder of the Bosnia and Herzegovina literature. This means that he was Bosnian Franciscan who wrote in narodni jezik (transl. Peoples Language), which, beside Bosnian, was a common name for the South Slavic language, Štokavian dialect, among Bosnians at the time. Such medieval writings, found in Bosnia and Herzegovina, Dalmatia, Old Herzegovina, like the Gršković's Apostle, the Hrvoje's Missal, the Hval's Codex, the Venetian Apocalypse, belong to the Bosnian literature, and are considered the written heritage, but not a literature in the strict modern sense.

The above analysis shows that Divković was not always an original writer, but a translator and compiler. As a translator, he was not meticulous about being faithful to his sources, which means that he modified them to bring them closer to the folk mixed idiom of the Eastern-Bosnian Štokavian dialect and Ikavian–Ijekavian accent, spoken between Olovo and Kreševo in Bosnia.

Considering the sources, he used within the Counter-Reformation, his choice was already obsolete in his age, since during the Catholic Baroque period, he found his models in Catholic literature of the late Middle Ages, which doesn't mean that he was not well versed in the literature of his time. Actually, researchers believe that Divković was very interested in his local public, so he chose those works that would have the strongest impact on the overall goal of Counter-Reformation, which explain why Divković had such a great success and gained reputation among Catholic circles which only Andrija Kačić Miošić could surpass. While the other Counter-Reformers went along with the times, using rationalism to lure people, Divković went back to the Middle Ages to attract his public through retelling of the biblical stories and ancient legends with characteristic medieval imagination. Divković's didactic prose abundantly uses "fiery" imagery of hell and purgatory for sinners and paradisical bliss for the just, while his sermons abound with the tales about miracles and the supernatural.

== Influence on literary development and legacy ==
In his native Bosnia and Herzegovina, Divković is considered to be "father of literature", but he left his mark on all Slavic communities between Slovenia and Bulgaria. His works and his style have been widely and continually researched as part of the Bosnian and Herzegovinian, Croatian, Montenegrin and Serbian written heritage, as the Shtokavian-Iekavian dialect of his native language eventually became the basis of the literary languages developed in all these countries in the 19th century. Many writers influenced by him followed his style and used his language, for instance, in Bosnia Stjepan Margitić and Stjepan Matijević, in Croatia Toma Babić from Skradin, Pavao Stošić from Lika, Antun Depope from Krk, and Đuro Matijašević from Dubrovnik. This prevalence of the Shtokavian among writers and public intellectuals of that time, especially ones belonging to Illyrian movement, was the main reason dialect prevailed as the basis for the development of standard language in all the variants of Serbo-Croatian, i.e. Bosnian, Croatian, Montenegrin and Serbian.

In his homeland Bosnia and Herzegovina, Divković's legacy and importance, beside the religious doctrine and church teachings that he spread, is signified by his reputation as the first Bosnian typographer who printed the first Bosnian book, written in Bosnian using Bosančica, the language and the alphabet people in Bosnia spoke and could read.

== See also ==
- List of Glagolitic books

== Works ==
- Nauk krstjanski za narod slovinski (Christian Doctrine for the Slavic People, 1611)
- Sto čudesa aliti znamenja blažene i slavne Bogorodice (One Hundred Miracles or Signs of the Blessed and Glorious Virgin, 1611)
- Beside Divkovića vrhu evandelja nedjeljnieh priko svega godišta (Divković's Words on Sunday Gospel All Year Round, 1616)
- Nauk krstjanski s mnoziemi stvari duhovniemi 1616 (Christian Doctrine with Many Spiritual Matters), edition 1641

== Works on Divković and his work ==
- DIVKOVIĆ: OTAC BOSANSKE KNJIŽEVNOSTI, PRVI BOSANSKI TIPOGRAF by Ivan Lovrenović
- Iskušenje fra Matije Divkovića u Mlecima by Ivan Lovrenović
