= Mihanović's fragment of the Acts of the Apostles =

Glagolitic manuscripts written in Old Church Slavonic

Mihanović’s fragment of the Acts of the Apostles (Serbo-Croatian: Михановићев одломак Апостолa, Mihanovićev odlomak Apostola) is medieval South Slavic codex, and one of the oldest preserved Glagolitic manuscripts written in Old Church Slavonic, a passage from the Acts of the Apostles.

Features of the Serbian vernacular appear in it, and the Serbian recension of Old Church Slavonic would later develop under this influence. It is considered, on the basis of some language features (e.g. replacement of the letter f with the letter p , i.e. Stepan instead of Stefan) and the Glagolitic alphabet itself, that it originated at the end of 11th century or early 12th century in Bosnia or Zeta or Zahumlje.

The manuscript itself consists of two sheets of parchment, 24 cm × 18.5 cm in size, on which is inscribed the part of Acts of the Apostles, according to the Eastern Orthodox rite and is related, in place and time of origin, to the so-called Gršković's fragment of the Acts of the Apostles.

Manuscript was found glued on the cover of a 1262 Serbian transcript of Ilovička krmčija, Zakonopravilo, in the collection of Cyrillic manuscripts of Antun Mihanović, and is considered the oldest preserved transcript, collection of civil and ecclesiastical regulations of the Byzantine Empire, which was translated by Saint Sava at the beginning of the 13th century.

== Legacy ==
According to Croatian linguist Vatroslav Jagić, the Mihanović's fragment along with Gršković's fragment represents few survived glagolitic Serbian Orthodox rite codices. The book is enumerated in the Bosnian and Serbian historical medieval literary corpus.

Today, the artifact is kept in the library of Croatian Academy of Sciences and Arts in Zagreb.

== See also ==
- List of Glagolitic manuscripts (900–1199)
- Lists of Glagolitic manuscripts
- Medieval Bosnian literature
- Serbian manuscripts

== Sources ==
- Savić, Viktor (2016). Српска редакција црквенословенског језика: од св. Климента, епископа словенског, до св. Саве, архиепископа српског [The Serbian Redaction of the Church Slavonic Language: from St. Clement, the Bishop of the Slavs, to St. Sava, the Serbian Archbishop]. Slověn : International Journal of Slavic Studies (in Serbian (Cyrillic script)). 5 (2): 231–339. hdl:21.15107/rcub_dais_14490.
- Kuna, Herta (2008). Srednjovjekovna bosanska književnost [Medieval Bosnian literature] (in Bosnian). International Forum Bosnae. ISSN 1512-5122.
- Žagar, Mateo (2008). "Grafetičke posebnosti tekstova istočne grane hrvatskoga glagoljaštva" [Graphetic specialities of the texts of the eastern branch of the Croatian Glagolitism]. Slovo (56–57). Zagreb: Staroslavenski institut: 695–708. ISSN 1849-1049.
