= Čajniče Gospel =

Oldest gospel written in medieval Bosnia

Čajniče Gospel Čajničko jevanđelje
- Čajniče Monastery, Čajniče, Bosnia and Herzegovina
- Type: Bosnian Church four gospels codex
- Date: beginning of the 15th century
- Place of origin: Medieval Bosnia
- Language: Bosnian recension of Church Slavonic
- Scribe: at least 5 anonymous scribes
- Patron: Pavlović noble family
- Material: thin parchment and pigments, bound in wooden covers covered with leather
- Size: 167 leaves, 19,5 x 15 cm
- Condition: good
- Script: Bosnian Cyrillic
- Illumination(s): archaic, mostly initials
- Previously kept: unknown
- Other

KONS of Bosnia and Herzegovina
- Official name: Čajniče Gospel book in the museum of the Churches of the Dormition of the Virgin and the Ascension of Christ, the movable property
- Type: movable property
- Criteria: A, C ii.v., E ii.iii.iv.v., G i.ii.iii.iv.vi., H i.
- Designated: April 25, 2013 (?th session, Sarajevo)
- Reference no.: 3724
- Decision no.: 07.2-2-75/04-5
- State of conservation: Preserved
- Status: National Monuments of Bosnia and Herzegovina

Čajniče Gospel (Serbo-Croatian: Čajničko jevanđelje, Чајничко јеванђеље) is the oldest gospel written in medieval Bosnia, which probably belonged to the Bosnian noble family, the Pavlovićs, and is the only medieval Bosnian gospel that has been kept in the country to this day.

Based on linguistic features, Čajniče Gospel is dated to the early 15th century and originated in eastern Bosnia. The preservation and correct use of the letter yat point to the eastern Bosnian region. Yat is retained in its etymological position, although there is also a smaller number of ikavisms, some of which have linguistic explanations, while others are considered the result of the adopted practice of ikavization of certain lexemes in Bosnian codices. The codex is declared a National monument of Bosnia and Herzegovina.

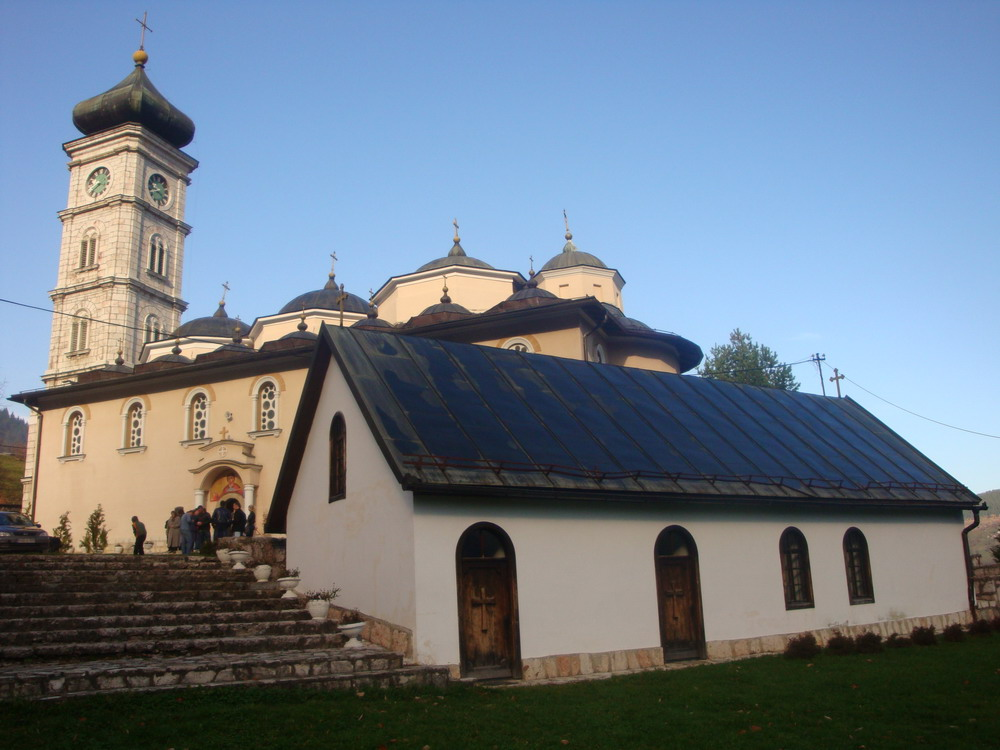
The museum of the Church of the Assumption of the Blessed Mother of God.

The museum of the Church of the Assumption of the Blessed Mother of God, of the Serbian Orthodox Čajniče Monastery, in Čajniče, Republika Srpska, Bosnia and Herzegovina, keeps the book.

== Controversy ==
The Čajničko Gospel, was declared a national monument of Bosnia and Herzegovina by the Commission to Preserve National Monuments of Bosnia and Herzegovina in 2013. According to the law, the property can't be moved or taken out of Bosnia and Herzegovina without the explicit consent of the Commission. However, in 2022 Gospel was taken out of Bosnia and Herzegovina to Serbia for reparation in Belgrade without asking for a consent from the Commission, which is a legally binding, and which prompted the agency to notify the District Prosecutor's Office in Trebinje. Afterward that same year, and nearly ten years after Gospel was declared a protected monument in 2013, the newly appointed member of the Commission from Republika Srpska, decided to contest the designation decision from 2013. The Metropolitanate of Dabar-Bosnia, who claim the ownership over the protected property, supported a Serb member of the Commission for contesting the 2013 decision. Several months later, the protected property, Čajniče Gospel, has returned from Belgrade to Čajniče Monastery.

== See also ==
- Hrvoje's Missal
- Hval's Codex
