= Manuscript of the Christian Radosav =

Medieval Bosnian manuscript

Radosav's Codex (Radosavljev zbornik) or Codex of the Christian Radosav (Zbornik krstjanina Radosava) is a medieval Bosnian manuscript belonging to the Bosnian Church. It was written by krstjanin Radosav to krstjanin Gojsav during the reign of Bosnian king Stjepan Tomaš (1443-1461). It belongs to the Bosnian redaction of the Old Church Slavonic language.

The manuscript consists of 60 pages, measuring 14.3 x 11 cm. The manuscript is named after the monk Radosav, who wrote it for the monk Gojsav. A colophon contains basic historical information about this manuscript that does not fall within the scope of the religious texts of the Collection: "Si knigi piše Radosavь krьstiêninь Goisavu krьstiêninu, a pisaše se u dni g(ospo)d(i)na krala Tomaša i dida Ratka. Gospodo, ako samь ĉo loše postavio, nemoite se tomui porugati, ere mi sta ruci trudьni težeće. Čtite i blagoslovite, a vasь Bogь bl(a)g(o)slovi u viki am(i) nь". ("These books are written by Radosav krstjanin Goisav krsjaninu, and they were written in the days of the lord king Tomaš and grandfather Ratko. Gentlemen, if I have written anything wrong, do not mock me, for the difficulty has disappeared from my hand that has been working. Read and be blessed, and may God bless you forever. Amen"). The manuscript does not explicitly state the year of the compilation, but given that it was written during the reign of "King Thomas", it can be concluded that the manuscript dates from the reign of the penultimate Bosnian king, Stjepan Thomas (1443-1461). Nothing is known about the author of the manuscript, the Christian Radosav. Judging by the Ikavian dialect, the manuscript was probably written in the southwestern part of Bosnia. The manuscript is now in the Vatican Library, where it was transferred in 1902 from the Sacra Congregatio de Porpaganda Fide bookstore.

Radosav's Codex is unique in its content and in the arrangement of the text and illuminations, and especially in its linguistic features. The manuscript is richly decorated with human and animal figures intertwined in the ornament, with a picture of the Christian Radosav, without images of saints, angels or the face of the Holy Trinity, although the Apocalypse contains and requires such illustrations. Radosav's Codex contains the Apocalypse, the Lord's Prayer, under which is written the Glagolitic alphabet, the beginning of the Gospel according to John, the scribe's colophon, and part of Paul's Epistle to Titus II, 12-13, written in Glagolitic (twice - in the hand of Radosav, and later in another hand). On the last leaf are some Cyrillic inscriptions. In Radosav's collection, the Apocalypse is placed at the beginning, before the Gospel according to John, unlike in the Venetian and Hval's Codex where the Apocalypse is placed after the Gospel.
