= Charter of Ban Kulin =

1189 trade agreement

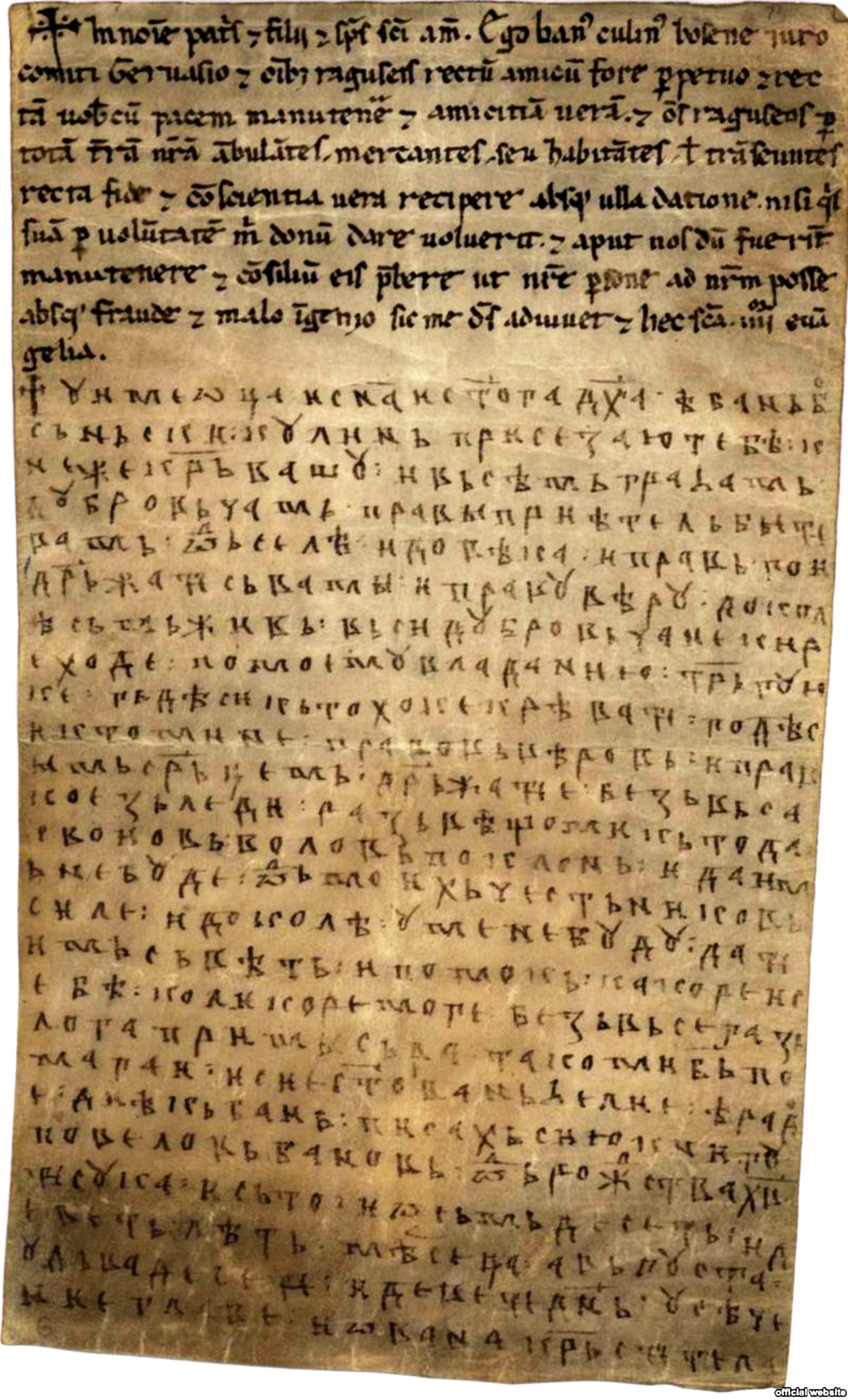
- Copy B of the Charter of Ban Kulin.
- Original title: Povelja Kulina bana/Повеља Кулина бана
- Created: 29 August 1189
- Commissioned by: Ban Kulin
- Author: scribe Radoje
- Subject: Ragusan trade rights in the Banate of Bosnia
- Purpose: trade agreement

The Charter of Ban Kulin (Bosnian/Croatian/Serbian: Povelja Kulina bana, Повеља Кулина бана) was a trade agreement between the Banate of Bosnia and the Republic of Ragusa that effectively regulated Ragusan trade rights in Bosnia, written on 29 August 1189. It is one of the oldest written state documents in the region.

According to the charter, Bosnian Ban Kulin promises to knez Krvaš (Gervasio according to the Latin text) and all the people of Dubrovnik full freedom of movement and trading across his country. The charter is written in two languages: Latin and an old form of Shtokavian dialect, with the Shtokavian part being a loose translation of the Latin original. The scribe was named Radoje, and the script is Bosnian Cyrillic (Bosančica).

== Language ==
The Charter is the first diplomatic document written in the old Bosnian language and represents the oldest work written in the Bosnian Cyrillic script (bosančica). As such, it is of particular interest to both linguists and historians.

Original text (in Latin and Slavic) and translation (in Bosnian and English)

Charter of Ban Kulin
Original Latin text	Original Slavic text
☩ In noĩe pat̃s ⁊ filii ⁊ sp̃s sc̃i am̃. Ego banꝰ culinꝰ bosene juro comiti Geruasio ⁊ oĩbꝰ raguseis rectũ amicũ fore p̱petuo ⁊ rec tã nobiscũ pacem manutenë ⁊ amicitiã uerã. ⁊ õs raguseos p̱ totã t̃rã nr̃ã ãbulãtes, mercantes, seu habitãtes ꝉ trãseuntes recta fide ⁊ cõscientia uera recipere absq’ ulla datione. nisi qͥs suã p̱ volũtatẽ mͥ donũ dare uoluerit. ⁊ aput nos dũ fuerĩt manutenere ⁊ cõsiliũ eis p̈bere ut nr̃e p̱sone ad nr̃m posse absq’ fraude ⁊ malo īgenjo sic me ds̃ adiuunet ⁊ hec sc̃a. iiijor euã gelia.	☩ ꙋимеѡцаисн꙯аист꙯огадх꙯а·ѣбаньбⷪ сьньски:кꙋлиньприсеꙁаютебѣ:к нежекр꙯ьвашꙋ:ивьсѣмьграꙉамь· дꙋбровьчамь·правыприѣтельбыти вамь:ѡⷣьселѣ:идовѣка·иправь·гои др꙯ьжатисьвамы:иправꙋвѣрꙋ:докол ѣсьмьживь:вьсидꙋбровьчанекир еходе:помоемꙋвладанию:тр꙯ьгꙋю ке:гьдѣсикьтохокекрѣвати:год꙯ѣс иктомине:правовьвѣровь:иправ имьср꙯ьцемь:др꙯ьжатие·беꙁьвьса коеꙁьледи:раꙁвѣщомикьтода своиовь:воловьпоклонь:идаим ьнебꙋде:ѡⷣьмоихьчестьниковь силе:идоколѣ:ꙋменебꙋдꙋ:дати имьсьвѣть:ипомокь:какореис ебѣ:коликоремоге:беꙁьвьсегаꙁь логапримьсьла:такомиб꙯ьпо магаи:исиест꙯оⷷваньꙉелие:ѣрадⷪ е:диѣкьбань:писахьсиюкнигꙋ повеловь:бановь:ѡⷣьрожⷷствахв꙯ тисꙋка:исьто:иѡсьмьдесеть:ид еветьлѣть:мѣсецаавьгꙋста: ꙋдьвадесети:идеветидн꙯ь·ꙋсѣче ниеглавеиѡванакр꙯ститла:

Charter of Ban Kulin
Latin transliteration	Bosnian translation	English translation
U ime oca i s(i)na i s(ve)toga d(u)ha. Ě banь bosьnьski Kulinь prisezaju tebě kneže Krьvašu i vьsěmь građamь Dubrovьčamь pravy priětelь byti vamь odь selě i dověka i pravь goi drьžati sь vamy i pravu věru dokolě sьmь živь. Vьsi Dubrovьčane kire hode po moemu vladaniju trьgujuke gьdě si kьto hoke krěvati godě si kto mine pravovь věrovь i pravimь srь(dь)cemь drьžati e bezь vьsakoe zьledi razvě što mi kьto da svoiovь volovь poklonь; i da imь ne bude odь moihь čestьnikovь sile i dokolě u mene budu dati imь sьvětь i pomokь kakore i sebě kolikore moge bezь vьsega zьloga primysьla. Tako mi B(ože) pomagai i sie s(ve)to evanьđelie. Ě Radoe diěkь banь pisahь siju knigu povelovь banovь odь rožestva H(risto)v(a) tisuka i sьto osьmьdesetь i devetь lětь měseca avьgusta u dьvadeseti i deveti d(ь)nь usěčenie glave Iovana Kr(ь)stit(e)la.	U ime Oca i Sina i Svetoga Duha. Ja, bosanski ban Kulin, obećavam tebi kneže Krvašu i svim građanima Dubrovčanima da ću vam biti pravim biti od sada i dovijeka i pravicu držati sa vama i pravo povjerenje dokle sam živ. Svi Dubrovčani koji se kreću gdje ja vladam, trgujući, gdje god se žele kretati, gdje god koji hoće, s pravim povjerenjem i pravim srcem, bez ikakve naknade, osim dobrovoljnog dara meni [vladaru]. Neće im biti od mojih časnika sile, i dokle u mene budu, davat ću im pomoć kao i sebi, koliko se može, bez ikakve zle primisli. Kunem se Bogom i ovim Svetim Evanđeljem. Ja Radoje banov pisar pisao sam ovaj list po banovoj naredbi hiljadu sto osamdeset i devet godina od rođenja Hristova, mjeseca augusta dvadeset i deveti dan, na dan odrubljenja glave Jovana Krstitelja.	In the name of the Father, and of the Son, and of the Holy Spirit. I, the Bosnian ban Kulin, promise to you comes Krvaš and all the citizens of Dubrovnik to be a true friend from now and for ever. And I shall keep justice with you and true trust, as long as I live. All citizens of Dubrovnik can move where I rule, trade, move wherever they want to, with real confidence and real heart, without having to pay any toll unless a gift given to me of their own free will. They will not be forced by my officers, and as long as they stay in my lands, I will help them as I would myself, as I can, without any evil thoughts. I swear by God and this holy Gospel. I, Radoje, the ban's scribe, wrote this document by the ban's command, in the year thousand one hundred and eighty-nine since the birth of Christ, in the month of August on the twenty-ninth day (on the day of) decapitation of John the Baptist.

Apart from the trinitarian invocation (U ime Oca i Sina i Svetago duha), which characterizes all charters of the period, the language of the charter is completely free of Church Slavonic influence. The language of the charter reflects several important phonological changes that have occurred in Shtokavian until the 12th century:

- loss of Common Slavic nasal vowels /ę/ > /e/ and /ǫ/ > /u/
- loss of weak jers (occurred during the 10th century; ceased to be spoken in the 11th century). Scribal tradition preserved them word-finally but they were not actually uttered.
- The vowel yeri /y/ never occurs word-initially, and turns to /u/ after /k, g, x/. In the 12th century it has a very limited usage, and starts being replaced with the vowel /i/, a change also attested in Humac tablet.
- change of word-initial cluster vь- to /u/

== History ==
The first to bring the charter to the public eye was Serbian émigrée Jeremija Gagić (1783–1859), the former Russian consul in Dubrovnik, who claimed to have saved the document in 1817. It was later known that the document was held in the Dubrovnik Archive until at least 1832, when it was copied by Đorđe Nikolajević and published by Franz Miklosich in Monumenta Serbica (1858). Nikolajević was entrusted with copying Cyrillic manuscripts from the Dubrovnik Archive (in the Kingdom of Dalmatia) in 1832 for scholarly publication, at which time he stole the manuscripts, along with other manuscripts such as the 1249 charter of Bosnian Ban Matej Ninoslav, the 1254 charter of Serbian King Stefan Uroš I and župan Radoslav, the 1265 letters of Stefan Uroš I and the 1385 letters of King Tvrtko I. Jeremija Gagić obtained the charter that Nikolajević stole, and sold or donated it to the Academy of Sciences in Saint Petersburg, where it is held today. Dubrovnik Archive preserves another two copies of the charter.

== Analysis ==
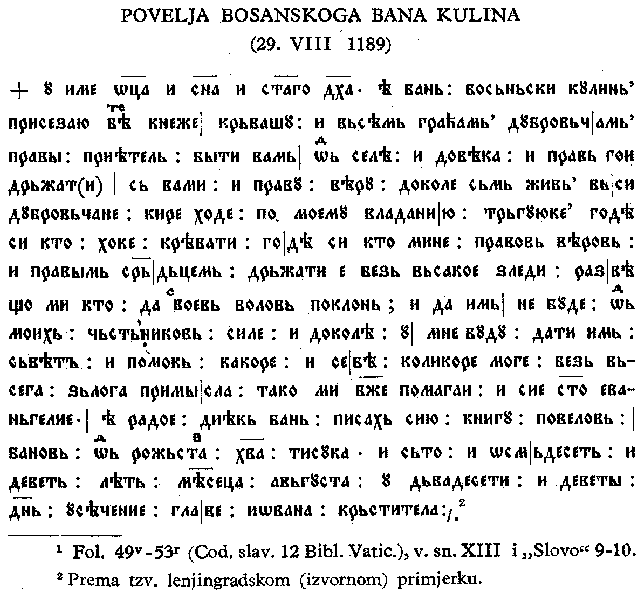
Cyrillic transcript of "the original" manuscript (copy A).

The Saint Petersburg copy is in the literature usually called "the original" (or copy A), and copies stored in the Dubrovnik Archive as "younger copy" (or copy B) and "older copy" (or copy C). At first it was thought that the Saint Petersburg copy, which was the first one to be published and studied, was the original and others were much younger copies (for example, Milan Rešetar dated the copies B and C into the latter half of the 13th century) but that was called into question by later analyses. According to a study by Josip Vrana, evidence that copy A represents the original remains inconclusive at best, and according to a comparative analysis that copy represents only a conceptual draft of the charter according to which the real original was written. Copies B and C are independent copies of the real original, which was different from the copy A.

Palaeographic analysis indicates that all three copies of the charter were written in approximately the same period at the turn of the 12th century, and that their scribes originate from the same milieu, representing the same scribal tradition. Their handwriting on the one hand relates to the contemporary Cyrillic monuments, and on the other hand it reflects an influence of the Western, Latin culture. Such cultural and literary opportunities have existed in the Travunia–Zeta area which encompassed the Dubrovnik region at the period. Copy A probably, and copies B and C with certainty, originate from the scribe who lived and was educated in Dubrovnik and its surroundings.

Linguistic analysis however does not point to any specific characteristics of the Dubrovnikan speech, but it does show that the language of the charter has common traits with Ragusan documents from the first half of the 13th century, or those in which Ragusan scribal offices participated. Given that Ragusan delegates participated in the drafting of their copy, everything points that a scribe from Dubrovnik area must have participated in the formulation of the text of the copy A. However, that the final text was written at the court of Ban Kulin is proved by how the date was written: using odь rožьstva hristova, and not the typical first-half-of-the-13th-century Dubrovnikan lěto uplьšteniě.

== Legacy ==
It is regarded part of Bosnian and Serbian literature. According to Bosnian author Rusmir Mahmutćehajić, the charter is of great significance in Bosnian national pride and historical heritage.

== Links ==
- Bosnia Yearns for Return of Its ‘Birth Certificate’, Balkan Insight, 07 SEP 17
