= Čajniče Monastery =

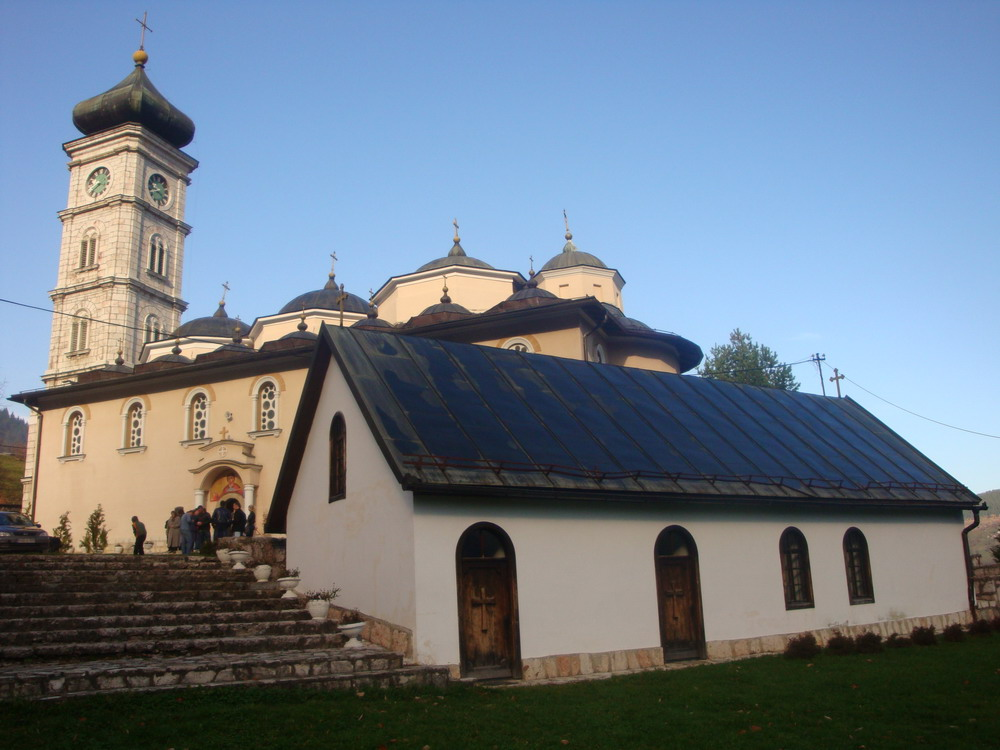
- Interactive map of Čajniče Monastery

Monastery information
- Denomination: Serbian Orthodox Church

Architecture
- Heritage designation

KONS of Bosnia and Herzegovina
- Official name: Churches of the Ascension of Christ and the Dormition of the Virgin, the architectural ensemble
- Type: Category I cultural and historical property
- Criteria: II. Value; A, B, C ii.iii.iv.v., D i.iii.iv.v., E i.ii.iii.iv.v., G iii.iv.vi., H i.ii.iii.
- Designated: September 12, 2007 (session No. -, Sarajevo)
- Reference no.: 2985
- Decision no.: 07.2-2-75/04-5
- Listed: List of National Monuments of Bosnia and Herzegovina
- Operator: Crkvena Opština Čajniče

Site
- Location: Čajniče
- Country: Bosnia and Herzegovina
- Coordinates: 43.55793°N 19.07261°E
- Public access: yes
- Other information: relics and items: Icon of Mother of God of Čajnička, Čajniče Gospel
- Website: https://www.cocajnice.com/

The Čajniče Monastery with its Church of the Assumption of the Blessed Mother of God (Serbian: Цркба успења пресвете богородице, romanized: Crkva uspenja presvete bogorodice) is a Serbian Orthodox monastery located in Čajniče, Bosnia and Herzegovina, Republika Srpska.

There are, actually, two churches side by side, the new and the old one. The old church dates from the end of the 16th possibly beginning of the 17th century, and the new one was built in 1857. The church is known for the miraculous icon of the Holy Virgin. This is the only extant example of icon painting in Bosnia dating from pre-Ottoman times. It is the processional icon of the Virgin and Child painted on one side, and of St. John the Baptist on the other. Popularly known as the Čajniče Beauty and deemed miraculous, the icon comes from the Church of the Assumption, a traditional place of pilgrimage. It is the work of a Byzantine artist painted in the first half of the fourteenth century, or as historians estimate, around 1329–1330.

== History ==
=== Old Church – Church of the Ascension of Christ ===
The old church was used as a parish church until the construction of the new church. There is no exact information about the time of its construction, but it is known that it was renovated in 1893. From the records in various books kept in the Čajniče collection of old books, the church certainly existed before 1893, the year of renovation.

One of such records is found in the book from the late 15th- or early 16th century. The record states that the book was donated by "servant of God, Ilija Savić Aksentije for eternal remembrance in the temple of the Assumption of the Most Holy Theotokos”, which most likely refers to the Herzegovina Metropolitan Aksentije (t.1751–1763). This shows that a church with the same temple dedication existed in Čajniče in the mid-18th century. There is a record in another book from 1651, with two inscriptions, one by a priest named Jovo Vergović from 1833 and the other record from the same year about the Gradaščević rebellion.

Judging by its external appearance and some other characteristics, it can be said that the building is significantly older. This primarily refers to the very modest facade, simple structural system and the fact that the floor level is buried in relation to the ground, similar to other old churches such as in Mostar or in Čelebići near Foča. According to the data from the building's file, prepared by the Institute for the Protection of Monuments of Bosnia and Herzegovina, it is stated that the building can be dated to the very end of the 16th or beginning of the 17th century, when a large number of Orthodox churches were built or renovated throughout Bosnia and Herzegovina.

=== World War II ===
In 1943, upon the arrival of Ustaše units, the Old Church was plundered and on that occasion they robbed the church treasury and took all the valuables from it. Before the devastation itself, the locals took all the belongings and books from the church, and took the icon to the house of a Serb woman, Milka Spremo. After the departure of the Ustaše detachments, eight people took the icon to the church of the village of Strečanja (between Čajniče, Foča and Pljevlja). From Strečanja, the icon was moved to a cave for greater security, where it was kept under heavy guard. From the cave, it was moved to the village of Slatina (near Foča), and placed in the church in that village, and later transferred to the village of Trpinje, where it remained until the end of the war. A priest occasionally came there and served, and people gathered in considerable numbers. After the war, after the repair of the Old Church, the icon was returned to its former place. Today, it is placed in this church.

== Čajniče Gospel ==
The museum of the Church of the Assumption of the Blessed Mother of God keeps the Čajniče Gospel, the oldest gospel written in Bosnia, which probably belonged to the Bosnian noble family Radinović-Pavlović, and is the only medieval Bosnian gospel that has been kept in the country to this day. It probably originates at the beginning of the 15th century, and by evaluating the language characteristics and its Ijekavian dialect, it is certain that it originates from ijekavijan eastern Bosnia. The codex was written in shorthand, with a semi-constitution of the Bosnian type, also known as Bosnian Cyrillic.

It is estimated that five main scribes took turns, continuously writing the text. The Čajniče Gospel is a four-gospel, and only parts of the Gospel of Matthew, the Gospel of Mark, and most of the Gospel of Luke have been preserved, while the Gospel of John, the beginning and end of the manuscript, and a certain number of pages in the middle are lost, so that in present condition the manuscript has 167 pages. The Čajničko Gospel manuscript was introduced to science in 1900 based on a description of the entire literary collection from the Čajniče monastery. The codex is declared a National monument of Bosnia and Herzegovina.

== See also ==
- Zavala Monastery
