= Kočerin tablet =

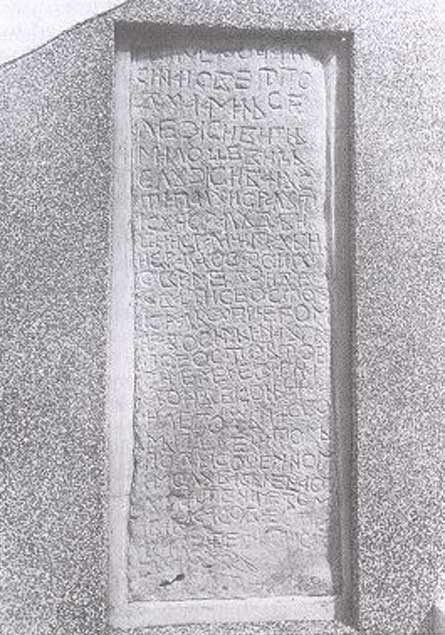
The Kočerin Tablet.

The Kočerin Tablet is a medieval tablet with an inscription written in Bosnian Cyrillic, in an archaic West Stokavian dialect of Serbo-Croatian, using Ikavian pronunciation.

== History and discovery ==
The stećak tombstone, which is placed on the grave of Viganj Milošević, was cut and inscribed in 1404 or 1405. The text is positioned on the bottom of the stećak, which is discovered in a necropolis Lipovac, in a field just west and outside of today’s village of Kočerin, 9 kilometres (5.6 mi) away from the town of Široki Brijeg, Bosnia and Herzegovina, where it was discovered in 1983. In 1872, stećak was moved to Kočerin and built-in into the right side of the local parochial office wall. In May 2004, it was carefully removed from the office wall and exhibited in the parochial premises in Kočerin.

== Dimensions ==
The tablet measures 54 centimetres (21 in) across on the bottom, 49 centimetres (19 in) in the middle, and 50 centimetres (20 in) at the top. It measures 134 centimetres (53 in) in height. The top part is damaged.

== Text ==
The tablet contains 25 rows of script, with 9-15 characters on each line. There are 300 characters in total and represents the largest known text in Bosnian Cyrillic.

The text displays a large number of ligatures. It is written in a Shtokavian Ikavian dialect, without nasal vowels, in a single-yer script, with some apparent Glagolitic influence. The form svetago shows influence from Church Slavonic, but the rest of the inscription is free of Church Slavonicisms in its morphology.

The text mentions how Viganj Milošević served five rulers: Banus Stjepan, King Tvrtko, King Dabiša, Queen Gruba, and King Ostoja. The inscription ends by saying: имолꙋвасьненаст ꙋпаитенамеѣсмь билькаковиесте виꙉетебитикако вьсмьѣ (transl. And I beg you do not step on me because I was as you are and you shall be as I am).

Complete original text with translations

Kočerin tablet
Original text	Latin transliteration	Modernized Serbo-Croatian	English
☩ ваимеѡцаи синаисветаго дхааминьсе леживигань милошевиꙉь слꙋжибанꙋс- типанꙋикралꙋт- кꙋикралꙋдаби- шиикралицигрꙋби икралаостоииꙋт- овримедоиде свадисеостоѣ кральсхерцегом иꙁбоснмьинаꙋгре поеостоѣтов- римеменевигна доидеконьчина илегохьнасво- мьплеменитомь подькочериномь имолꙋвасьненаст ꙋпаитенамеѣсмь билькаковиесте виꙉетебитикако вьсмьѣ	☩ va ime ōca i sina i svetago d[u]ha aminĭ se leži viganĭ miloševiđĭ služi banu s- tipanu i kralu t- [vrĭt]ku i kralu dabi- ši i kralici grubi i krala ostoi i u t- o vrime doide svadi se ostoě kralĭ s hercegom[ĭ] i z bosn[o]mĭ i na ugre po[id]e ostoě to v- rime mene vigna doide konĭčina i legohĭ na svo- mĭ plemenitomĭ podĭ kočerinomĭ i molu vasĭ ne nast- upaite na me ě smĭ bilĭ kako vi este vi đete biti kako- vĭ smĭ ě	☩ U ime oca i sina i svetoga duha, amin. Ovdje leži Viganj; Milošević. Služih banu S- tjepanu i kralju T- vrtku i kralju Dabi- ši i kraljici Grubi i kralja Ostoju, i u t- o vrijeme dojde i svadi se Ostoja kralj s Hercegom i s Bosnom, i na Ugre pojde Ostoja. U to v- rijeme meni, Vignju, dojde kraj, i legoh na svo- m plemenitom pod Kočerinom. I molim vas, ne nast- upajte na mene. Ja sam bio kako vi jeste, vi ćete biti kaka- v sam ja.	☩ In the name of the Father and the Son and the Holy; Spirit, amen. Here lies Viganj; Milošević. I served Ban S- tephen and King T- vrtko and King Dabi- ša and Queen Gruba and King Ostoja and in that time came and quarrels Ostoja the King with the Duke and with Bosnia on the Hungarians took Ostoja. At the t- ime there came to me, Viganj, my end, and I lay down on my heritage [tribal land], under Kočerin. And I pray you, do not tread on me, since I was as you are [now], and you shall be as I am.
