= Jelaške =

Village in Olovo, Bosnia and Herzegovina

- Village
- Location within Bosnia and Herzegovina
- Coordinates: 44.2864877°N 18.3913254°E
- Country: Bosnia and Herzegovina
- Entity: Federation of Bosnia and Herzegovina
- Canton: Zenica-Doboj
- Municipality: Olovo

Area
  - Total: 3.07 sq mi (7.94 km^{2})

Population (2013)
  - Total: 454
  - Density: 148/sq mi (57.2/km^{2})
- Time zone: UTC+1 (CET)
  - Summer (DST): UTC+2 (CEST)

Jelaške is a village in the municipality of Olovo, Bosnia and Herzegovina.

The village is a place where Matija Divković (1563 – 21 August 1631, Olovo) was born. He was a Bosnian Franciscan and writer, and is considered to be the founding father of the Bosnia and Herzegovina literature.

== Demographics ==
According to the 2013 census, its population was 454.

Ethnicity in 2013
Ethnicity	Number	Percentage
Bosniaks	445	98.0%
other/undeclared	9	2.0%
Total	454	100%
