= Johann Herolt =

Johann Herolt, also known as Discipulus (died August 1468) was a Dominican preacher. Herolt has been described as "the most prolific, skillful, and honored writer of sermon books in fifteenth-century Europe". He was "one of the leading figures of a new Dominican spirituality in fifteenth-century Germany which emphasized the practical goals of pastoral work over mystical study".

As lector and prior of the Dominican monastery in Nuremberg, Herolt was a colleague of Johannes Nider. Herolt was also vicar of Nuremberg's Dominican convent, the cloister of St Katharine, which he and Nider reformed in 1428, appointing Gertrud Gwichtmacherin as prioress. He was prior at Nuremberg from 1437 to 1443.

Herolt's Sermones discipuli de tempore et de sanctis was the most widely reprinted sermon collection of the fifteenth century. Herolt collected exemplary stories for use in sermons, and these story collections - one thematic, one of miracles of the Virgin Mary, and one of miracles of the saints - also circulated in manuscript and were widely reprinted as Promptuaria exemplorum.

Herolt's Advent, Christmas and New Year sermons to the Nuremberg convent in 1436 - his only work in the German vernacular, Der Rosengart - have recently been translated and published.

== Works ==
- Liber discipuli de eruditione Christifidelium, 1416
- Sermones de tempore, 1418
- Sermones de sanctis, 1432
- Promptuaria exemplorum
- Quadragesimale, 1434
- Applicationes rerum naturalium ad sermones, 1463
- Sermones Discipuli de tempore et de sanctis, cum Promptuario exemplorum et Promptuario de miraculis b. Mariae Virginis, 1495 : exemplaire numérisé par les Facultés Loyola Paris accessible en ligne
