= Aleksandar Mladenović =

Aleksandar Mladenović (Bitola, 25 August 1930 – Belgrade, 6 April 2010) was a Serbian linguist, university professor, member of the Serbian Academy of Arts and Sciences, and an associate of Matica srpska.

== Biography ==
Born in Bitola, Mladenović finished high school in Kruševac in 1949, continuing his studies at the Department for Serbian Language and Literature at the Faculty of Philosophy of the University of Belgrade. Already as a student he won several prestigious awards.

Mladenović began his career as an assistant professor of history of Serbian language at the Faculty of Philosophy of the University of Novi Sad, where in 1963 he obtained his PhD. He became a professor in 1968 and the head of the department in 1985, the position he held until his retirement in 1995.

From 1978 until his death he was the head of the Archaeographical department of the National Library of Serbia in Belgrade. He was also president of the Committee for Kosovo and Metohija and of the Committee for Dialectology.

== Scientific work ==
Mladenović mostly wrote about the history of Serbian literary and vernacular languages of the Late Medieval and Early Modern periods (subjects such as: Serbian Church Slavic language, influences of the Russian Church Slavic recensions on Serbian liturgical and literary language, creation and development of Slavonic-Serbian language), including the history of the Medieval Serbian literature.

He was also interested in work of Njegoš about whom he published a number of papers and two books. His edition of Mountain Wreath (from 2001) is considered the best when it comes to comments and explanations.

In 1979 he started the magazine Arheografski prilozi which he edited for a long run of years. He was also editor in chief of Zbornik Matice srpske za filologiju i lingvistiku and of Srpski dijalektološki zbornik.

He was a guest professor at universities of Leningrad, Warsaw, Kraków, Sofia, Sarajevo and Skopje.
