= Gršković's fragment of the Acts of the Apostles =

Glagolitic manuscripts written in Old Church Slavonic

Gršković's fragment of the Acts of the Apostles (Serbo-Croatian: Гршковићев одломак Апостолa, Grškovićev odlomak Apostola) is medieval South Slavic codex, which represents one of the oldest preserved monuments written in Glagolitic script in Old Slavic language, a passage from the Acts of the Apostles.

It is considered, based on some features of the Serbian redaction (e.g. replacing the letter f with the letter p, i.e. Stepan instead of Stefan) of Glagolitic alphabet itself, created at the end of 11th century or at the beginning of the 12th century. The localization and origin is unknown, between the territory of Bosnia or Zeta or Zachlumia. It is written in Glagolitic transitional type, between "Macedonian" and Croatian.

The passage itself consists of four sheets of parchment measuring 15.5 by 21.7 centimetres (6.1 in × 8.5 in), facing east (ad orientem)and is related, in terms of the place and time of origin, to Mihanović's fragment.

Fragments were found at the end of the 19th century by priest Jerko Gršković in Vrbnik on Krk and according to him these fragments got its name. They are kept in the archive of the Croatian Academy of Sciences and Arts.

== Legacy ==
According to Croatian linguist Vatroslav Jagić, the Gršković's fragment along with Mihanović's fragment represents few survived glagolitic Serbian Orthodox rite codices. The book is enumerated in the Bosnian and Serbian historical medieval literary corpus.

== See also ==
- Gospel of Mary
- List of Glagolitic manuscripts (900–1199) o
- Lists of Glagolitic manuscripts

== Bibliography ==
- Kuna, Herta (2008). Srednjovjekovna bosanska književnost [Medieval Bosnian literature] (in Bosnian). International Forum Bosnae. ISSN 1512-5122.
- Savić, Viktor (2016). Српска редакција црквенословенског језика: од св. Климента, епископа словенског, до св. Саве, архиепископа српског [The Serbian Redaction of the Church Slavonic Language: from St. Clement, the Bishop of the Slavs, to St. Sava, the Serbian Archbishop]. Slověn : International Journal of Slavic Studies (in Serbian (Cyrillic script)). 5 (2): 231–339. hdl:21.15107/rcub_dais_14490.
