= Herta Kuna =

Croatian and Bosnian-Herzegovinian philologist and historian

- Born: Požega
- Died: Zagreb
- Occupation: professor
- Known for: Medieval Bosnian Literature

Academic work
- Discipline: Philology
- Sub-discipline: Medieval Bosnian literature
- Institutions: Sarajevo Faculty of Philosophy
- Website: Herta Kuna

Herta Kuna was a Croatian and Bosnian-Herzegovinian philologist and historian. She spent her career, between 1958 and 1987, at the Sarajevo Faculty of Philosophy, where she taught Old Church Slavonic, history of language, and history of literary language. She made an important contribution to the research of medieval Bosnian literature and Bosnian Franciscan literacy.

== Career and works ==
She changed the approach to the history of literary language, connecting the traditional philological method with newer sociolinguistic studies of literary and standard language, applying it to medieval Bosnian, but also to some other corpora (Muslim folk poetry, the press in Bosnia and Herzegovina until 1918, and the works of Dositej Obradović). Thanks to her great efforts, in 1986 a phototype and critical edition of one of the most important monuments of medieval Bosnia – the Hval's Codex – was published.

Her decades-long research into medieval Bosnian literature was collected in the book Medieval Bosnian Literature, published in 2009 by the International Forum "Bosnae".

== Awards ==
For her scientific and pedagogical work, she received several awards, including the April 6th Award of the City of Sarajevo, the July 27th Award, the Order of Labor with a Golden Wreath, the Order of Merit for the People with a Silver Star, the Medal for Courage, the University of Sarajevo Plaque, and the City of Sarajevo Plaque.

== Further readings ==
- https://collections.ushmm.org/search/catalog/vha17250
- "Oralna historija, intervju. Potreban Penn pasvord". Archived from the original on February 18, 2022.
- https://www.adscientificindex.com/scientist.php?id=1396998
- Zaradija-Kiš, Antonija (December 28, 2009). "Forum Bosnae, 2008., br. 45, Herta Kuna, Srednjo-vjekovna bosanska književnost, Međunarodni Forum Bosna, Sarajevo, 383 str". Narodna umjetnost. 46 (2).
- https://scholar.google.co.th/citations?hl=en&user=fbA0Et0AAAAJ
