= Humac tablet =

Inscribed stone slab, Bosnia and Herzegovina

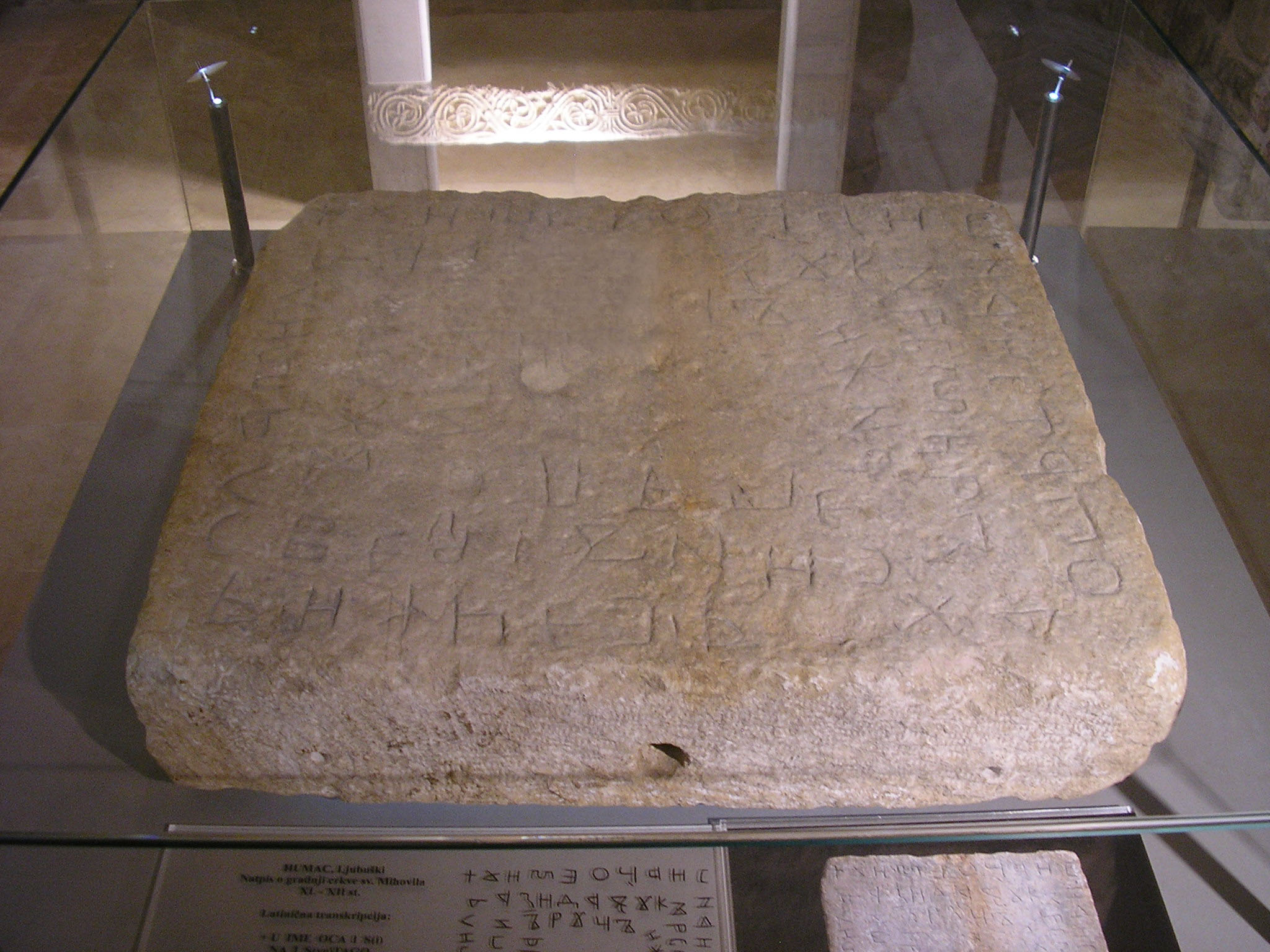
Humac tablet

The Humac tablet (Serbo-Croatian: Хумачка плоча, Хумска плоча / Humačka ploča, Humska ploča) is an Old Slavic epigraph in Bosnian Cyrillic script in the form of a stone tablet, believed to be variously dated to between the 10th and 12th century, being one of the oldest Bosnian preserved inscriptions.

It is the oldest Cyrillic epigraph found in Bosnia and Herzegovina. It was found in the village of Humac. It is kept at the museum of the Franciscan friary in Humac. It was first noted by a French diplomat at the Bosnia Vilayet.

There is disagreement over the dating; Yugoslav epigrapher and historian Marko Vego dated it to the end of the 10th or the beginning of the 11th century; linguist Jovan Deretić to the 10th or 11th century; historian Dimitrije Bogdanović to the 12th century.

The text of the tablet tells about the act of raising a church dedicated to the Archangel Michael by Krsmir (also rendered Uskrsimir or Krešimir) and his wife Pavica. The tablet is quadrangle in shape (68x60x15 cm), and the inscription is carved in form of a quadrangle in Cyrillic script among which five Glagolitic letters (four E-like letters resembling Ⰵ and a Ⱅ letter alongside a conventional Cyrillic Т) occur.

== Text ==
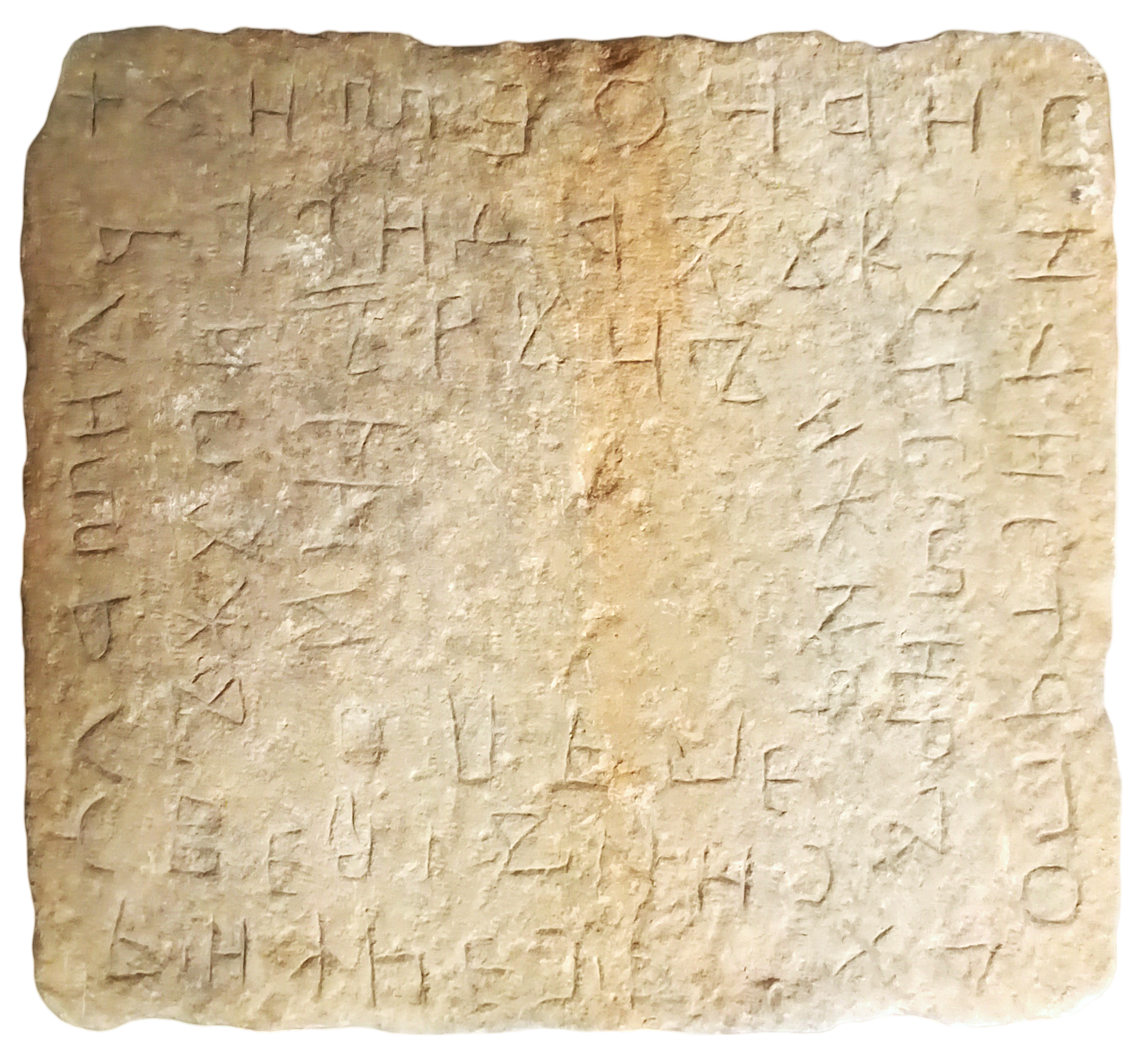
Humac tablet

Original text (/ denote line breaks)	✚ Ꙋ имэ О(ть)ца и С/(и)на и С(вэ)таго/Д(ꙋ)ха · А/сэ ц(рь)ки а/(рхан)ђ(э)ла Ми(хаи)ла/а зида [ј?]ꙋ К/ьрсмирь/синь [-]рэ/Ⱅь жꙋпи [?]рꙋ[н?]ь/и ж(э)на/эга Па/[-]ица
Modern Cyrillic rendering (Dizdar)	У име отца и сина и светаго духа. А се црки арханђела Михаила, а зида ју Крсмир, син Бретов, жупи урун, и жена јега Павица
Romanized text (Vego)	✚ U ime o(tь)ca i s(i)na i s(ve)tago d(u)ha. A se c(rь)ki a(rhan)đ(e)la Mi(hai)la, a zida ju u Kьrsmirь sinь Bretь? župi urunь? i ž(e)na jega Pavica.
Modernized Bosnian	U ime oca i sina i svetoga duha. Ovo je crkva arhanđela Mihajla, a zida je Krsmir sin Bretov, u župi Urun i žena njegova Pavica.
English translation	In the name of the Father and the Son and the Holy Spirit. This is the church of the Archangel Michael, built by Krsmir, the son of Bret, in the Parish of Urun, and his wife Pavica.

Transliteration and the interpretation of the text differs among Slavicists and paleographers.

== Sources ==
- Bogićević, Vojislav (1975). Pismenost u Bosni i Hercegovini: od Pojave slovenske pismenosti u IX v. do kraja austrougarske vladavine u Bosni i Hercegovini 1918. godine. Veselin Masleša.
- Deretić, Jovan (2001). Kratka istorija srpske književnosti. Svetovi.
- Deretić, Jovan (1983). Историја српске књижевности. Нолит.
- Dizdar, Mak (1971). Stari bosanski tekstovi. Svjetlost.
- Kuna, Herta (1974). "Хумачка плоча". Босанскохерцеговачка књижевна хрестоматија: Старија књижевност. Zavod za izdavanje udžbenika. pp. 27–.
- Nosić, Milan (1985). Humačka ploča. Ljubuški. pp. 159–164.
- Vego, Marko (1962). "Humac". Zbornik srednjovjekovnih natpisa Bosne i Hercegovine. Vol. 1. Sarajevo: Zemaljski muzej. pp. 30–31.
- Vego, Marko (1956). "Humačka ploča" [Humac Tablet]. Glasnik Zemaljskog muzeja. 11. Sarajevo: 41–61.
