= Bosnian Cyrillic =

Bosnian extinct variation of Cyrillic

- Script type: Alphabet Cyrillic script
- Creator: Unknown
- Period: 10th–19th century
- Languages: Serbo-Croatian

Related scripts
- Parent systems: Early Cyrillic script: Bosnian Cyrillic

Bosnian Cyrillic, also known as Bosančica, is a variant of the Cyrillic alphabet that originated in medieval region of Bosnia. The term was coined at the end of the 19th century by Ćiro Truhelka. It was widely used in modern-day Bosnia and Herzegovina and the bordering areas of modern-day Croatia (southern and middle Dalmatia and Dubrovnik regions).

Its name in Serbo-Croatian is Bosančica and Bosanica the latter of which might be translated as Bosnian script. Some of those who wrote in that script referred to it as the Serbian script. Neutral scholars call it Western Cyrillic. Serb scholars call it Serbian Script, Serbian Letters, Serbian–Bosnian script, Bosnian–Serb Cyrillic, Serbian Western Cyrillic, Serbian Minuscule, as part of variant of Serbian Cyrillic and deem the term "bosančica" anti-Serbian Austro-Hungarian propaganda. Croat scholars also call it Croatian script, Croatian–Bosnian script, Bosnian–Croat Cyrillic, harvacko pismo, arvatica. For other names of Bosnian Cyrillic, see below.

The use of Bosančica amongst Bosnian Muslims was replaced by Arebica upon the introduction of Islam in Bosnia Eyalet, first amongst the elite, then amongst the wider public. The first book in Bosančica was printed by Frančesko Micalović in 1512 in Venice.

== History and characteristic features ==
It is hard to ascertain when the earliest features of a characteristic Bosnian type of Cyrillic script had begun to appear, but some paleographers consider the Humac tablet to be the first document of this type of script and is believed to date between 10th to 12th century. Bosnian Cyrillic was used continuously until the 18th century, with sporadic usage even taking place in the 20th century.

Historically, Bosnian Cyrillic is prominent in the following areas: passages from the Bible in documents of Bosnian Church adherents, 13th and 15th century, numerous legal and commercial documents (charters, letters, donations) of nobles and royalty from medieval Bosnian state in correspondence with the Republic of Ragusa and various cities in Dalmatia (e.g. the Charter of Ban Kulin), beginning in the 12th and 13th centuries, and reaching its peak in the 14th and 15th centuries. It is also found in Tombstone inscriptions on marbles in medieval Bosnia and Herzegovina, chiefly between 11th and 15th centuries. Legal documents in central Dalmatia, like the Poljica Statute (1440) and other numerous charters from this area; Poljica and neighbourhood Roman Catholic church books used this alphabet until the late 19th century. The "Supetar fragment" from the 12th century was found in Monastery of Saint Peter in the Forest in central Istria, among the stones of a collapsed southern monastery wall. Until the 15th century it was a Benedictine monastery and later a Pauline monastery. This finding could indicate that Bosančica spread all the way to Istria and Kvarner Gulf.

The Roman Catholic diocese in Omiš had a seminary (called arvacki šeminarij, "Croat seminary") active in the 19th century, in which arvatica letters were used. Cyrillic was found in liturgical works (missals, breviaries, lectionaries) of the Roman Catholic Church from Dubrovnik, 15th and 16th century, the most famous of which is a printed breviary from 1512. The comprehensive body of Bosnian literature, mainly portion associated with the Franciscan order, from the 16th to mid-18th century and early 19th century forms the most abundant corpus of works written in Bosnian Cyrillic, covering various genres, but belonging to the liturgical literature: numerous polemical tractates in the spirit of the Counter-Reformation, popular tales from the Bible, catechisms, breviaries, historical chronicles, local church histories, religious poetry and didactic works. Among the most important writings of this circle are works of Matija Divković, Stjepan Matijević and Pavao Posilović.

After the Ottoman conquest, Bosnian Cyrillic was used, along with Arebica, by the Bosnian Muslim nobility, chiefly in correspondence, mainly from the 15th to 17th centuries (hence, the script has also been called begovica, "bey's script"). Isolated families and individuals could write in it even in the 20th century.

Thus, the main traits of Bosnian cyrillic is that it is a form of Cyrillic script mainly in use in Bosnia and Herzegovina, central Dalmatia and Dubrovnik. Its earliest monuments are from the 11th century, but the golden epoch covered the period from the 14th to 17th centuries. From the late 18th century it rather speedily fell into disuse to be replaced by the Latin script. Its primary characteristics (scriptory, morphological, orthographical) show strong connection with the Glagolitic script, unlike the standard Church Slavonic form of Cyrillic script associated with Eastern Orthodox churches. It had been in use, in ecclesiastical works, mainly in Bosnian Church and Roman Catholic Church in historical lands of Bosnia, Herzegovina, Dalmatia and Dubrovnik. Also, it was a widespread script in Bosnian Muslim circles, who, however, preferred modified Arabic aljamiado script. Serbian Orthodox clergy and adherents used mainly the standard Serbian Cyrillic of the Resava orthography. The form of Bosnian Cyrillic has passed through a few phases, so although culturally it is correct to speak about one script, it is evident that features present in Bosnian Franciscan documents in the 1650s differ from the charters from Brač island in Dalmatia in the 1250s.

== Controversy ==
Controversy about the "ethnic affiliation" of Bosnian Cyrillic started in the 19th century, and reappeared in the mid-1990s. The polemic about attribution and affiliation of Bosnian Cyrillic texts rests on several arguments. Serbian scholars claim that it is simply a variant of Serbian Cyrillic, a "minuscle", or cursive script devised at the court of Serbian King Stefan Dragutin, and that Bosnian Cyrillic texts ought to be included in the Serbian literary corpus. Authors in Prilozi za književnost, jezik, istoriju i folklor in 1956, go as far to state that Bosančica was a term introduced through Austro-Hungarian propaganda, and regarded it a type of cursive Cyrillic script, without any specifics that would warrant "isolation from Cyrillic". The main Serbian authorities in the field are Jorjo Tadić, Vladimir Ćorović, Petar Kolendić, Petar Đorđić, Vera Jerković, Irena Grickat, Pavle Ivić and Aleksandar Mladenović.

On the Croatian side, there is a split among philologists. One school of thought challenges the letters being Serbian, claiming that the majority of the most important Bosnian Cyrillic documents had been written either before any innovations devised at the Serbian royal court happened, or that did not have any historical connection with it whatsoever. In light of that, they consider Serbian claims on the origin of Bosnian Cyrillic to be unfounded and allege that the texts belong to the Croatian cultural sphere and literary corpus, thus advocating for the name to be Croatian Cyrillic instead of Bosnian. The other Croatian school of thought acknowledges that the "Serbian connection" – as exemplified in variants present at the court of King Dragutin – did influence Bosnian Cyrillic, but, they aver, it was only one strand, since scriptory innovations took place both before and after the Serbian court's interventions. This group claims that all texts from Croatia, and only a part of those written on the territory of contemporary Bosnia and Herzegovina, are to be placed into the Croatian literary canon. This does not include all Bosnian Christian texts, but does include all Franciscan texts and the majority of legal and commercial documents. The second school of thought also generally uses the name "Western Cyrillic" instead of "Croatian Cyrillic" (or Bosnian Cyrillic, for that matter). Both schools allege that supposedly various sources, both Croatian and other European, call this script "Croatian letters" or "Croatian script". The main Croatian authorities in the field are Vatroslav Jagić, Mate Tentor, Ćiro Truhelka, Vladimir Vrana, Jaroslav Šidak, Tomislav Raukar, Eduard Hercigonja and Benedikta Zelić-Bučan.

Herta Kuna, in her seminal book Medieval Bosnian Literature, stated that “(The) entire literacy of medieval Bosnia was written in a somewhat specific type of Cyrillic script that has certain differences from other Cyrillic scripts in use in Slavic areas.” She points out: “(I)t is precisely the Bosnian Cyrillic script that has retained some specificities in terms of graphics that are characteristic of the Glagolitic script and derive from it.” Jahić, Halilović, and Palić dismiss all claims of national affiliation made by either Croatian or Serbian philologists.

== Legacy ==
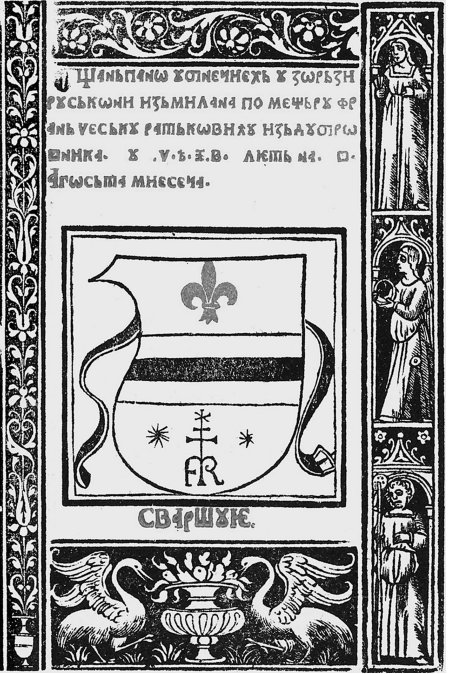
Micalović's colophon of Officio, printed in Venice in 1512, using Bosančica script

In 2015, a group of artists started a project called "I write to you in Bosančica" which involved art and graphic design students from Banja Luka, Sarajevo, Široki Brijeg, and Trebinje. Exhibitions of the submitted artworks will be held in Sarajevo, Trebinje, Široki Brijeg, Zagreb, and Belgrade. The purpose of the project was to resurrect the ancient script and show the "common cultural past" of all the groups in Bosnia and Herzegovina. The first phase of the project was to reconstruct all of the ancient characters by using ancient, handwritten documents.

== Names ==
The name bosančica was first used by Fran Kurelac in 1861. Other instances of naming by individuals, in scholarship and literature or publications (chronological order, recent first):

- srbski (Serbian), srpscie (Serbian), narodni srbski (Serbian Vernacular), srbski listina (Serbian Document), srbska ćirilica (Serbian Cyrillic), srbski pisano ćirilica i jezikom (Written Serbian in his Cyillic and Language), srbskoga slovi ćirilskimi (Serbian Cyrillic Letters/Script) and bosansko-dalmatinska ćirilica (Bosnian-Dalmatian Cyrillic), by Croatian linguist Vatroslav Jagić (1838–1923)
- poljičica, poljička azbukvica, among the people of Poljica and Frane Ivanišević (1863−1947)
- bosanska ćirilica ("Bosnian Cyrillic"), by Croatian historian and Catholic priest Franjo Rački (1828–1894); Herta Kuna, in her book Medieval Bosnian Literature.
- bosanska azbukva ("Bosnian alphabet"), by Catholic priest Ivan Berčić (1824–1870)
- (Bosnian-Catholic alphabet), by Franciscan writer Ivan Franjo Jukić (1818–1857)
- (Bosnian Cyrillic or Croatian Cyrillic alphabet), by Slovene linguist Jernej Kopitar (1780–1844)
- bosanska brzopisna grafija ("Bosnian cursive graphics"), by E. F. Karskij
- zapadna varijanta ćirilskog brzopisa ("Western variant of Cyrillic cursive"), by Petar Đorđić
- zapadna srpska ćirilica ("Western Serbian Cyrillic) by Viktor Savić
- srpska ćirilica (Serbian Cyrillic), srpski slovi (Serbian Letters/Script), azbukidarum servianorum (Serbian Alphabet), alphabetum servianorum (Serbian Alphabet), caracteres servianos (Serbian Characters), by Bosnian Franciscan writer Matija Divković (1563-1631), who explains in preface to his Nauk krstjanski za narod slovinski, that he wrote "for the Slavic folk in correct and true Bosnian language", while Georgijević also notes that he referred to the Bosnian Cyrillic, which he wrote in, as Serbian letters.

== Gallery ==
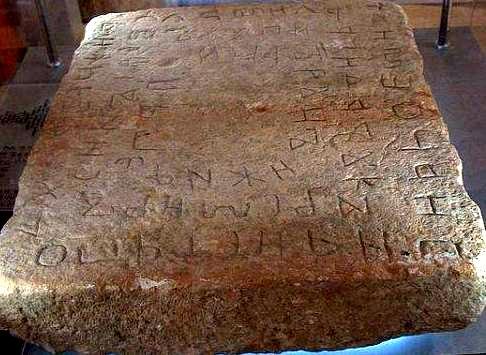
Humac tablet (10th–12th century)

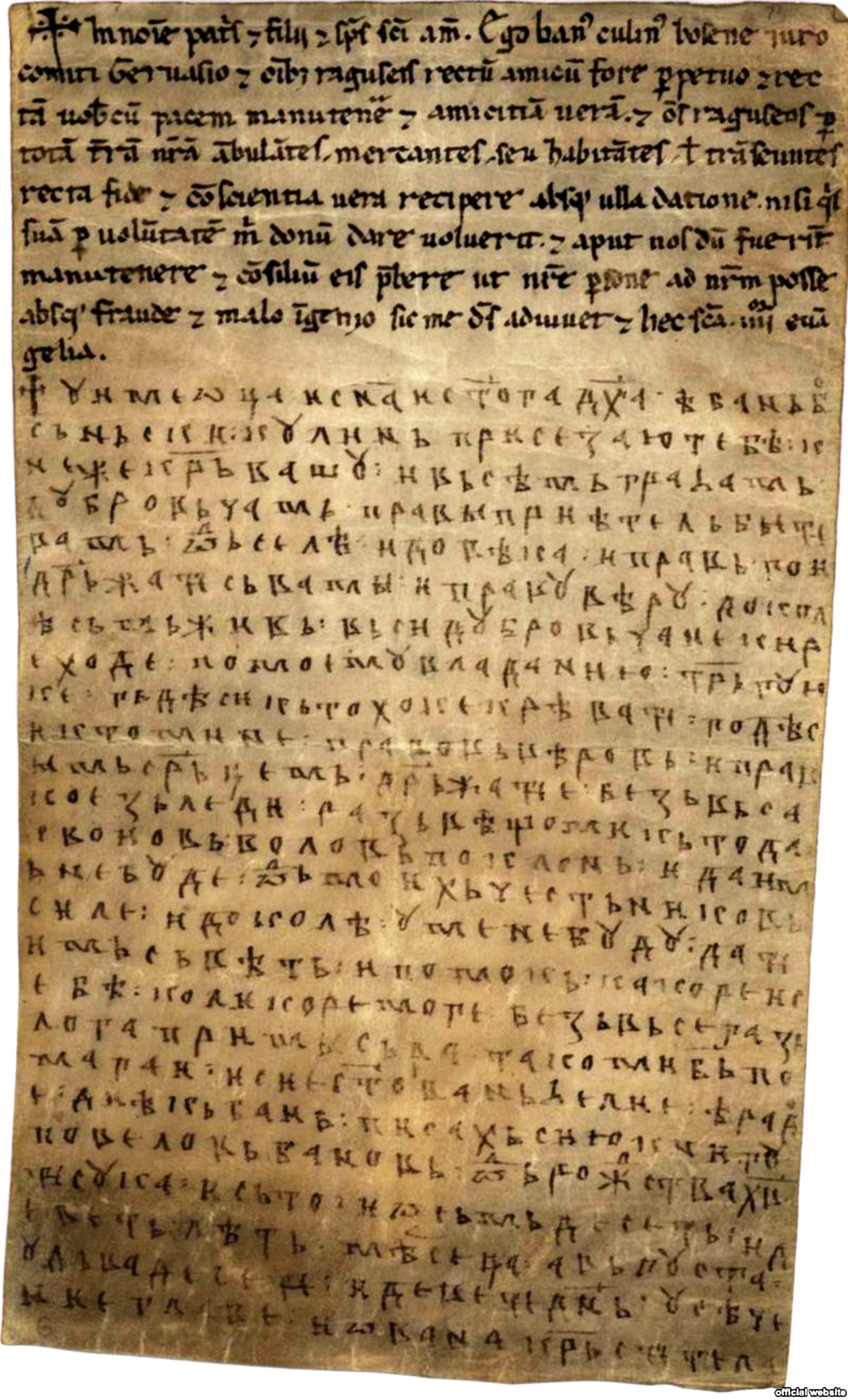
Charter of Ban Kulin of Bosnia (12th century)

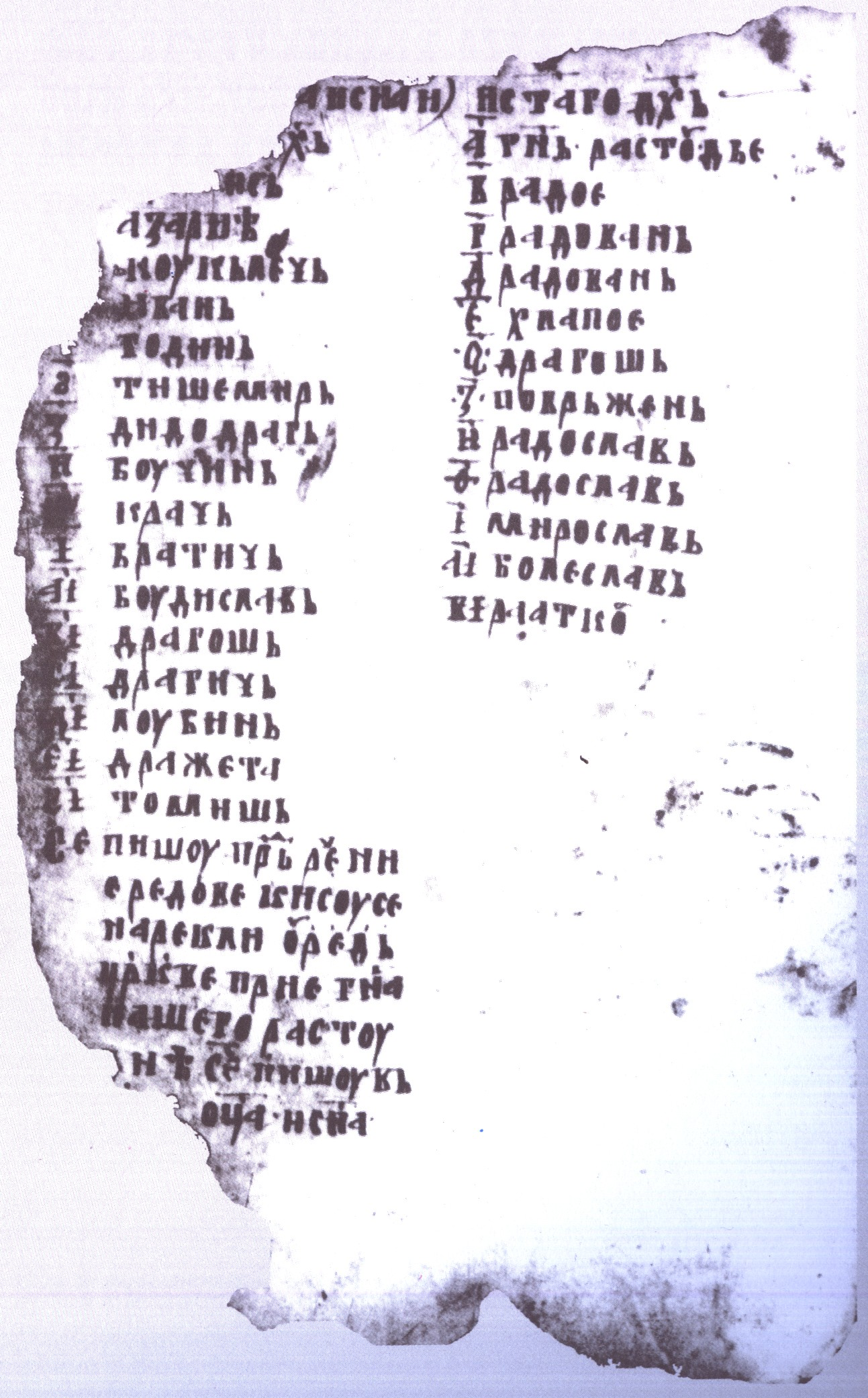
Batalo's Gospel (1393)

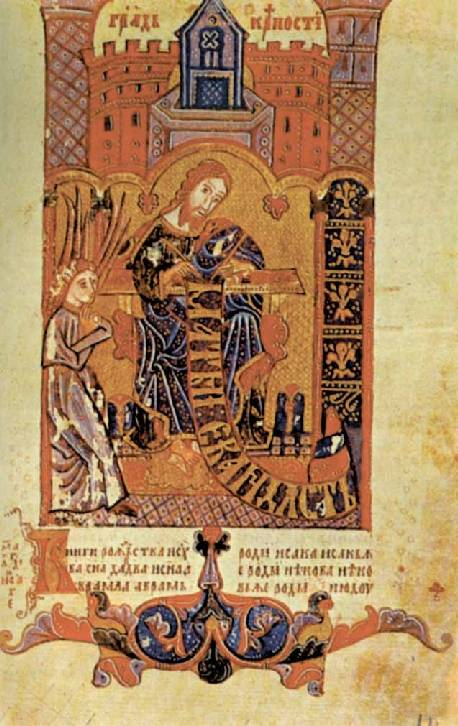
Hval's Codex, 1404, kept in the University of Bologna Library, Italy

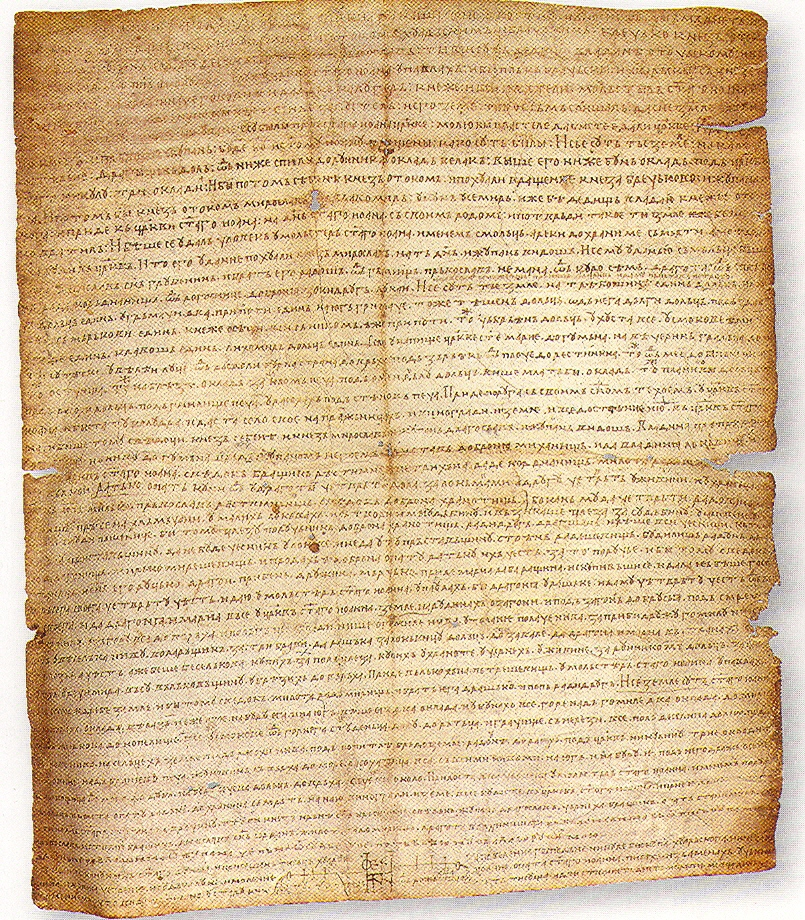
Povaljska listina (1250)

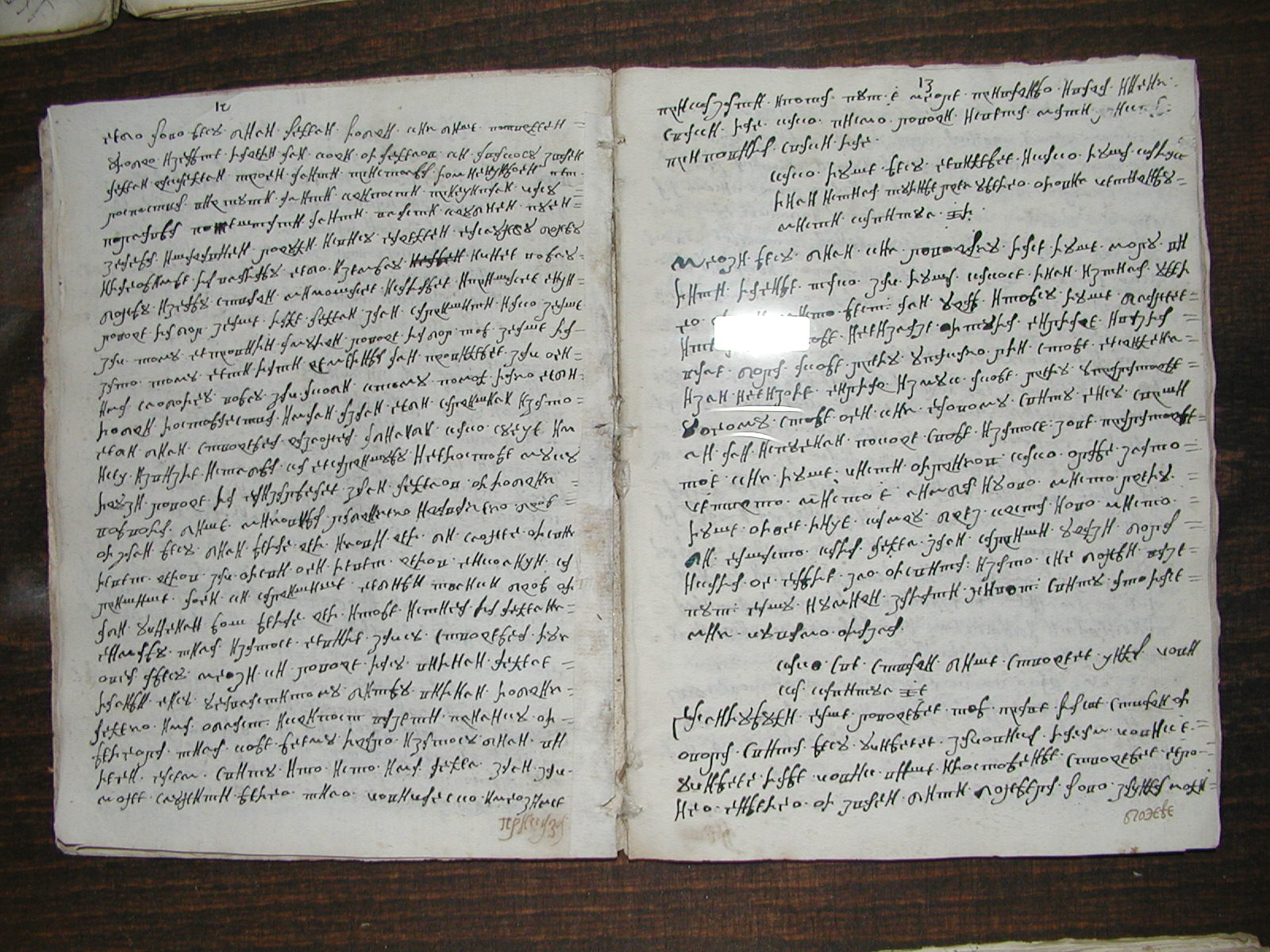
Document from Brač

== See also ==
- Modern Cyrillic script
- Early Cyrillic alphabet
- Reforms of Russian orthography
- Serbian Cyrillic alphabet
