= Hrvoje's Missal =

Hrvoje's Missal Hrvojev misal
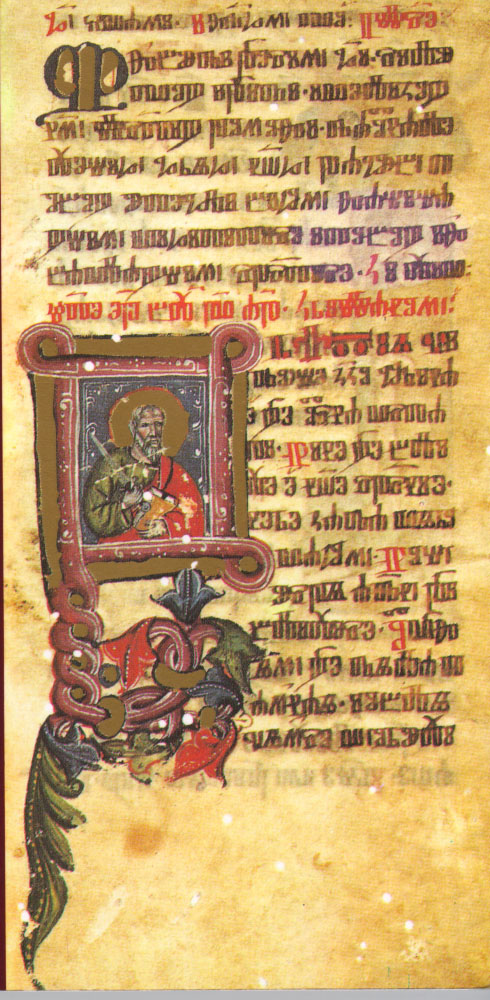
- Page from Hrvoje's Missal
- Created: 1407 or later
- Location: Topkapı Palace Museum Manuscript Library, Istambul, Turkey
- Author: Butko
- Purpose: Liturgical book

The Hrvoje's Missal (Croatian: Hrvojev misal) is a 15th-century missal written in Glagolitic alphabet.

== History ==
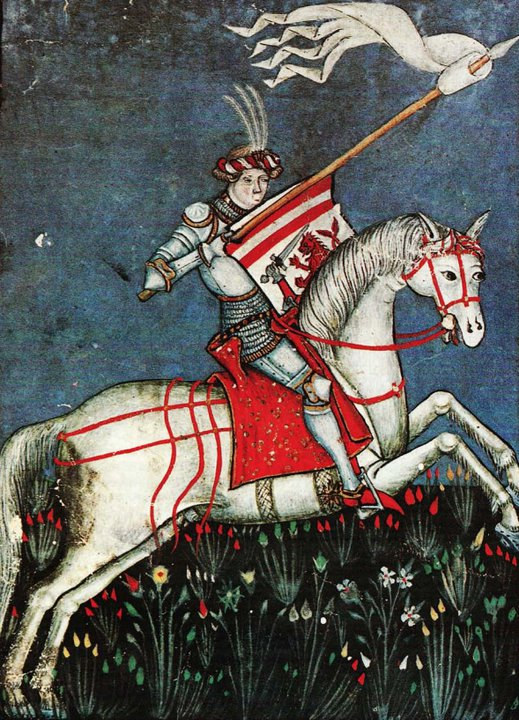
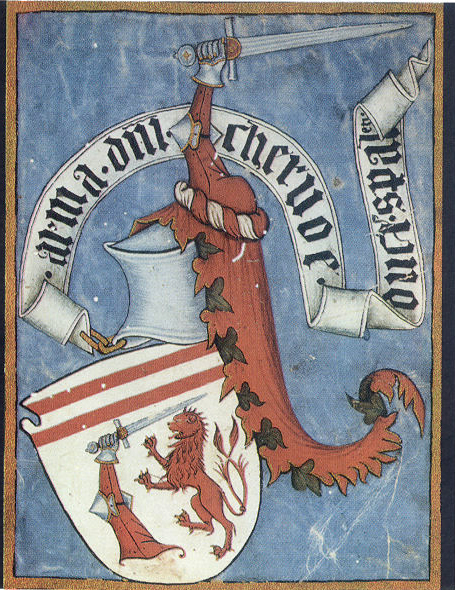
Illumination of Hrvoje Vukčić (left) and his CoA (right).

This liturgical book was written in Split by the resident calligrapher and Glagolitic scribe Butko in 1407 or later for Hrvoje Vukčić Hrvatinić (Kotor around 1350–1416) who was a Grand Duke of Bosnia, Knez of Donji Kraji, and Duke of Split. Hrvoje Vukčić was the most prominent member of the House of Hrvatinić and the strongest of the three main feudalists of the medieval Bosnian state, who in addition held lands and titles in Croatia and Hungary.

== Description ==
This document is dedicated to Hrvoje Vukčić, and is of great significance to Croatian and Bosnian history. Hrvoje's Missal found its way to Istanbul and is currently kept at the Topkapı Palace Museum Manuscript Library. The knowledge of its existence was lost, until it was mentioned by linguists Vatroslav Jagic, L. Thallóczy and F. Wickhoff in the 19th Century. The book's location in the Topkapi Palace was determined by the art historian Mara Harisijadis in 1963.

Once bound in precious covers, from 19th century Hrvoje's Missal is in leather binding. It contains 247 folios, which includes 96 miniatures and 380 initials and many more small initials. Some details are made of golden leaves. It is written in two columns on 488 pp (22.5x31 cm), and contains also some music notation. Some initials contain architectural elements of the Dalmatian city of Split. The peculiarity and particular value of the Hrvoje's Missal lies in its combination of eastern and western principles in terms of composition and contents, thus making it a truly invaluable work with a place in the regional and transregional history of art.

== See also ==
- Glagolitic alphabet
- Hval Manuscript
- List of Glagolitic manuscripts (1400–1499)

== Bibliography ==
- V. Jagić - L. Thalloczy - F. Wickhoff: Missale glagoliticum Hervoiae ducis Spalatensis, Wien, 1891.
- Glagoljski misal Hrvoja Vukčića (fototipsko izdanje), Staroslavenski institut-Mladinska knjiga-Akademische Druck - u. Verlagsanstalt, Zagreb-Ljubljana-Graz, 1973.
