= Hval's Codex =

1404 Bosnian illuminated manuscript

Hval Manuscript Hval's Miscellany Hvalov zbornik
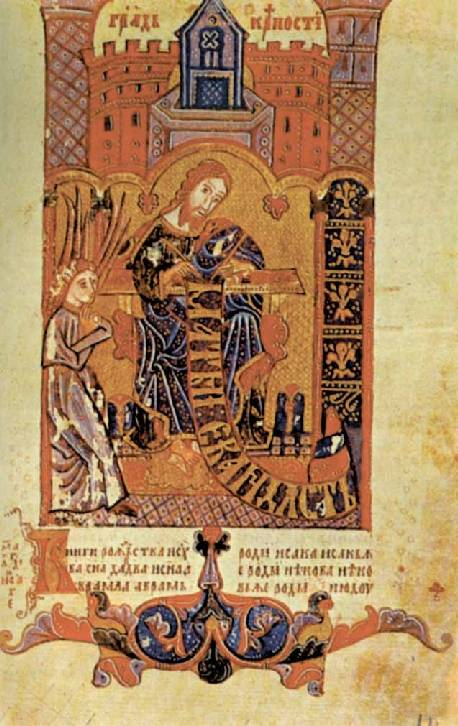
- Kristjanin Hval's Codex (or Hval Manuscript) from the medieval Kingdom of Bosnia
- Created: 1404
- Location: University of Bologna library, Bologna, Italy
- Author: Kristjanin Hval
- Purpose: Codex of the Bosnian Church

Hval's Codex (Serbo-Croatian: Хвалов зборник, romanized: Hvalov zbornik) or Hval's Manuscript (Serbo-Croatian: Хвалов рукопис, romanized: Hvalov rukopis) is a Bosnian Cyrillic manuscript of 353 pages written in 1404, in Split, for Duke Hrvoje Vukčić Hrvatinić. It was illuminated by Gothic artists from the Dalmatian littoral.

It was written in 1404 by krstjanin Hval in Bosnian Cyrillic in the Ikavian accent, with an introduction written in the Glagolitic alphabet, and is decorated with miniatures and other artistic elements. The codex contains parts of the Bible, hymns, and short theological texts, and it was copied from an original Glagolitic text, also evident from Glagolitic letters found in two places in the book.

The codex is one of the most famous manuscripts belonging to the Bosnian Church in which there are some iconographic elements which are not in concordance with the supposed theological doctrine of Christians (Annunciation, Crucifixion and Ascension). All of the important Bosnian Church books (Nikoljsko evandjelje, Srećkovićevo evandelje, the Manuscript of Hval, the Manuscript of Krstyanin Radosav) are based on Glagolitic Church books.

New analyses of style and painting techniques show that they were inscribed by at least two miniaturists. One painter was painting on the blue background, and the other was painting on the gold background in which the miniatures are situated in a rich architectonic frame.

The Hval Manuscript is kept in the University of Bologna library in Italy.

== See also ==
- Hrvoje's Missal
- Hrvoje Vukčić
