= Toričan fortress =

Toričan
- Location within Bosnia and Herzegovina
- 44°14′33″N 17°32′09″E
- Type: fortress
- Location: Varošluk, Travnik, Bosnia and Herzegovina
- Nearest city: Travnik

History
- Founded: before 1503
- Founder: Batalo Šantić
- Original use: noble family seat

Site notes
- Elevation: 848 m (2,782 ft)
- Architectural style: Romanic fortress
- Owner: state

Toričan was a medieval fortress in the area of Travnik and is considered to be a national monument of Bosnia and Herzegovina.

== Location ==
The fortress is located above Varošluk, in the territory of Lašva župa, just above Turbe. It is one of the older medieval Bosnian cities-fortresses. The position dominates the entire upper Lašva near Krč, at the elevation of 848 meters. The oldest mention of the fortress is from 1503 in the seven-year truce agreement signed by Vladislav II and Bayezid II. It is believed that fortress was built by the Bosnian court tepčija, Batalo Šantić. Below Toričan fortress is the wellspring Vrilo, which joins the watercourse of the stream Dubljajac. Toričan defended the water source and the town whose name is not known, located between Varošluk and Turbe. The city had towers in the east and in the west.

== History ==
The owner was a nobleman Bosnian Knyaz and tepčija, Batalo Šantić. Dijak (scribe) Stanko Kromirjanin wrote the famous Gospel of Batalo. It is dated 1393. Only four leaves of it remain. Today it is in the collection of the National Library in the Russian city of Saint Petersburg. Batalo Šantić married Resa Hrvatinić, sister of the Bosnian Grand Duke Hrvoje Vukčić Hrvatinić. Šantić was the lord of Lašva župa. Batalo's mausoleum is near Torićan. It was found in 1915. Toponyms and a large number of names are known from the Šantić family in the Lašva area.
