= Miroslav Brandt =

Croatian historian (1914–2002)

Miroslav Brandt (1914–2002) was a Croatian historian, writer, publicist and polymath. He contributed to disparate areas ranging from politics to history of religions and literary translation. His polemical works helped preserve the national identity of Croats under Yugoslavia.

== Biography ==
Brandt was born in Cerić near the Croatian town of Vinkovci. He graduated from the Faculty of Philosophy at the University of Zagreb in 1948, specializing in history, geography and Latin. In 1954, he obtained his Ph.D. from the same university with the thesis Development of Economic and Social Relationships in Split until the End of the 14th century. Brandt worked as a librarian in the National and University Library in Zagreb, a curator in the Historical Museum in Zagreb, an assistant at the Historical Institute of the Academy. Finally, Brandt was a professor and vice-dean at the Faculty of Philosophy in Zagreb for many years.

=== History, religion and literature ===
The opus of Miroslav Brandt includes large encyclopedic works, polemics and articles, as well as literary works. The greatest work in the first category is The Medieval Age of Historical Development, a monumental (around 800 pages) study presenting a detailed history of several centuries (starting from the 3rd) of European and Mediterranean history, describing the great clusters of civilizations of Western Christianity, Byzantium, Islam and other Asian societies (he even included Central American cultures). His magnum opus has many analyses of economy, culture, language, art, demography...

In 1989 Brandt wrote a large book called Sources of Evil: Dualist Themes, where he collected many older works he had read at international or local conferences. It is a book of ideas, showing Brandt's interest for gnostic and dualist currents in the history of religions. It includes a detailed analysis of Biblical books (Genesis, Ecclesiastes), a careful examination of the Toltec religion, Wycliffe's heresy, and local heretical movements in Dalmatia and Bosnia, especially the phenomenon of the Bosnian Church. As for other larger history works, there is Brandt's book on the Kievan Rus'. All these works are characterized by a modern critical and multifaceted approach, using archeology, palaeography, history of art and other auxiliary history disciplines.

However, Brandt had far wider interests than medieval and religious studies. As the translator of a part of Proust's cycle In Search of Lost Time, he showed a sensibility for literary and linguistic phenomena.

=== Pushing for the Croatian cause ===
With his interest in language, Brandt was one of the seven creators of the Declaration on the Status and Name of the Croatian Standard Language of 1967 (there are indications that Brandt personally wrote the text of the Declaration). As the Declaration went against the Yugoslav policy, Brandt became "undesirable": he was not given any serious punishment (neither were the other authors of the Declaration), but his field of activities was restricted.

Brandt's most significant polemical work is the Antimemorandum, a vehement response to the claims of the Memorandum of the Serbian Academy of Sciences and Arts. In it, Brandt posits that Serbs controlled the military, the political system, and the economy leading to "Greater Serbian centralisation" in Yugoslavia, with the Croats being exploited and oppressed as a result. Later he was the initiator of the collection Sources of Greater Serbian Aggression (1991), translated into English and French, which included his AntiMemorandum.

=== Autobiographical writings ===
In his old age Brandt turned to literature. He wrote an autobiography, Living with Contemporaries, where he paints a pessimist image of his life, with not much good to say about his colleagues historians, primarily Jaroslav Šidak and Nada Klaić.

Brandt's claim that his bourgeois origins developed national consciousness and non-communist worldview made him incompatible with the ideological framework of his profession which went against his whole being, is not easy to verify or evaluate. In his memoirs, he explains why he did not deal with Croatian themes (except marginally), instead using his erudition and interests to write about European and world history. Brandt's polemical statement is that Croatian historiography under Yugoslavia purposely reduced the national element to a minimum, claiming to destroy myths and create critical historiography as represented by Nada Klaić (whom Brandt accused of being protected by the communist regime only because he considered her work ultimately destructive for the Croatian national pride). Aside from the mentioned memoirs, he wrote a novel, Triptych, where he attacked communist totalitarianism. Brandt spent the last years of his life in resignation and pessimism. The available sources indicate that not even the creation of a sovereign Croatian state (which he embraced) managed to pull him away from the lethargy and the feeling of pointlessness as seen from his autobiographic works.

== Works ==
=== History ===
- Razvoj privrednih i društvenih odnosa u Splitu do kraja 14. stoljeća (Development of Economic and Social Relationships in Split until the End of the 14th Century), 1954
- Srednjovjekovno doba povijesnog razvitka (The Medieval Age of Historical Development), 1980
- Izvori zla: dualističke teme (Sources of Evil: Dualist Themes), 1989
- Izvori velikosrpske agresije (Sources of Greater Serbian Aggression), 1991

=== Literature ===
- Tri kratke priče (Three Short Stories), 1990
- Triptih (Triptych), 1992

=== Translations ===
- Combray by Marcel Proust, 1952
- Swann's Way by Marcel Proust, 1952
- Les Thibault by Roger Martin du Gard, 1953

=== Other ===
- Declaration on the Status and Name of the Croatian Standard Language (Deklaracija o nazivu i položaju hrvatskog književnog jezika), 1967, jubilee edition in 1997
