= Divoš Tihoradić =

Bosnian nobleman

Divoš Tihoradić was Bosnian nobleman from the Usora, connected to the fortified town of Srebrenik. The form of the patronymic suggests that his father was Tihorad, who died between 1326-1329. His brother was Vitan Tihoradić, and his sons were Miloš, Sladoje and Dobroslav Divošević. Divoš was first mentioned as a witness in a charter dated October 23, 1332, which regulated disputes between Bosnians and the people of Ragusa, and as a constable he was listed in a charter dated March 15, 1333, in which the Bosnian ban Stjepan II Kotromanić ceded Ston and Prevlaka to the people of Ragusa. The Tihoradići are relatives of the Zlatonosović nobility, known in the 15th century.

Divoš Tihoradić is known as the commissioner of the creation of a gospel, professionally called the Divoš Gospel after him, a significant monument from the 14th century.

== Literature ==
- Irena Grickat, Divoševo Jevanđelje, Južnoslavenski filolog 25, Beograd 1961-1962, 227-293
- Jelica Đurić – Rajka Ivanišević, Jevanđelje Divoša Tihoradića, Zbornik radova Vizantološkog instituta 7, Beograd 1961, 153-160.
- Mazrak, Ema (2019). "Prilog proučavanju iluminacije evanđelja Divoša Tihoradića" [A Contribution to the Study of the Illuminations of Divoš Tihoradić's Gospel]. Иницијал: Часопис за средњовековне студије (in Serbo-Croatian) (7): 83–100. ISSN 2334-8003.
- Pavao Anđelić, Postojbina i rod Divoša Tihoradića, Slovo 25-26, Zagreb 1976, 231-239.
