= Croatian Language Days =

Croatian Language Days (Croatian: Dani hrvatskoga jezika) is an annual week-long cultural event established by Matica hrvatska which celebrates the Croatian language. It is held from March 11 to March 17.

It was first held upon Croatian independence in 1991. In 1997 the Croatian Parliament declared that this week would officially commemorate the Declaration on the Status and Name of the Croatian Standard Language published exactly thirty years earlier.

The week is marked by cultural and literary events across Croatia, as well as among the Croats of Bosnia and Herzegovina.

== Sources ==
- Dani hrvatskoga jezika (in Croatian)
