= Comparison of Serbo-Croatian standard varieties =

Comparison of registers of the Serbo-Croatian language

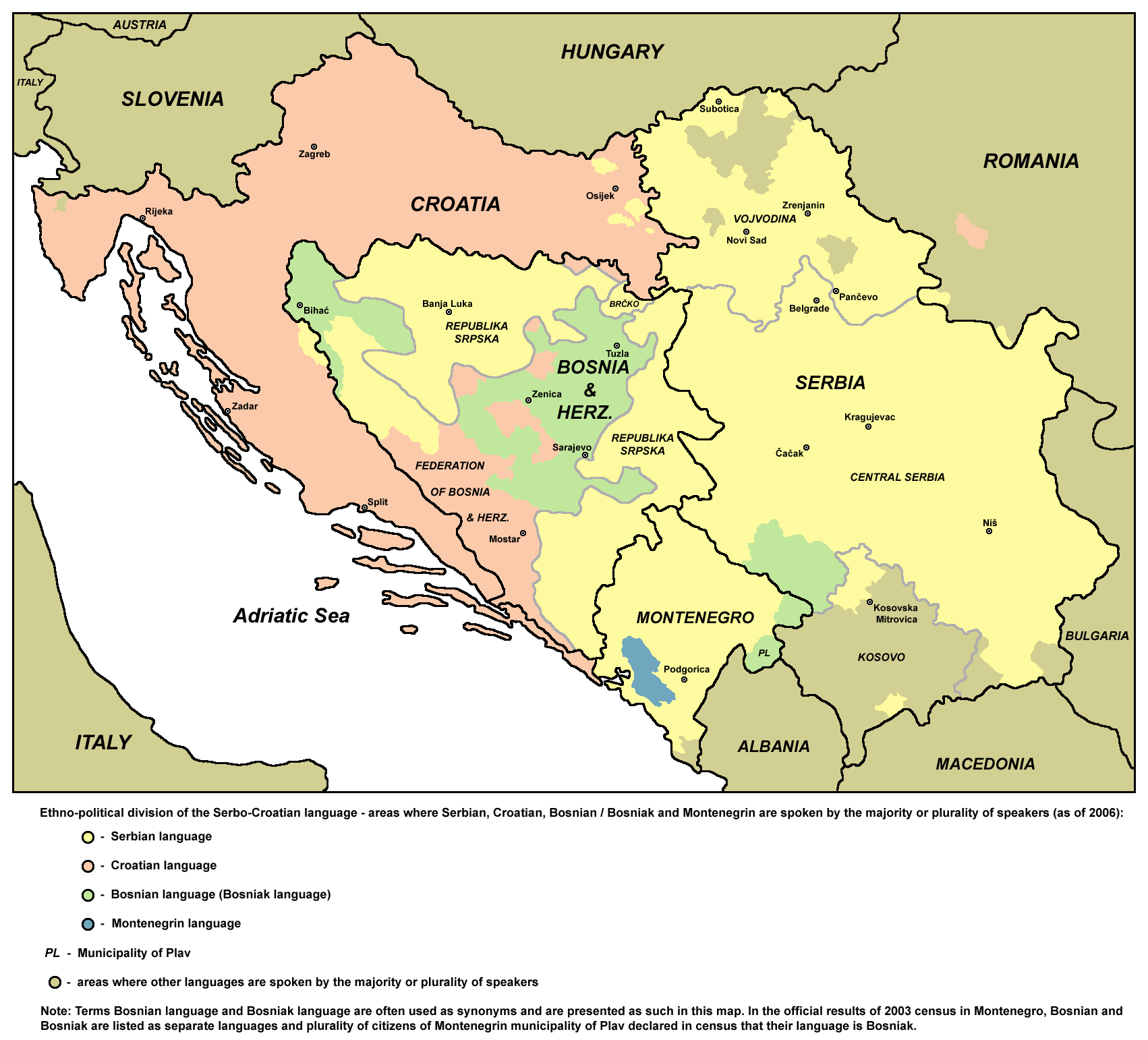
Map of region where the majority population speaks Bosnian, Croatian, Montenegrin, or Serbian, 2006

Standard Bosnian, Croatian, Montenegrin, and Serbian are different national variants and official registers of the pluricentric Serbo-Croatian language.

== History ==
In socialist Yugoslavia, the language was approached as a pluricentric language with two regional normative varieties: Eastern (used in Serbia, Montenegro, and Bosnia and Herzegovina by all ethnicities, either with the Ekavian or the Ijekavian pronunciation) and Western (used in Croatia by all ethnicities, the Ijekavian pronunciation only). However, due to discontent in Croatian intellectual circles, beginning in the late 1960s Croatian cultural workers started to refer to the language exclusively as 'the Croatian literary language', or sometimes 'the Croatian or Serbian language', as was common before Yugoslavia.

Bolstered with the 1967 Declaration on the Name and Status of the Croatian Literary Language, these two names were subsequently prescribed in the Croatian constitution of 1974. The language was regarded as one common language with different variants and dialects. The unity of the language was emphasised, making the differences not an indicator of linguistic divisions, but rather factors enriching the 'common language' diversity. West European scientists judge the Yugoslav language policy as an exemplary one: Although three-quarters of the population spoke one language, no single language was official on a federal level. Official languages were declared only at the level of constituent republics and provinces.

=== Post-communist era ===
With the breakup of the Yugoslav Federation, in search of additional indicators of independent and separate national identities, language became a political instrument in virtually all of the new republics. With a boom of neologisms in Croatia and a privileged position of the Cyrillic script in Serb-inhabited parts of the new states, every state and entity showed a 'nationalisation' of the language.

After the declaration of independence in 1992, Bosnian linguists reinstated the inherited Proto-Slavic *x, realised as h, in forms retained in Bosniak vernacular speech—such as lahak and mehak, with cognates in Slovenian lahek/mehek, Czech lehký and Russian лёгкий/мягкий. They also favoured ć over št in forms such as općina and uopće, and standardised older vernacular usage of some Turkish, German and Hungarian loanwords.

The independent standardisation of the language in Montenegro, debated among Montenegrin academics since the 1990s, culminated in the 2009 orthography and 2010 grammar reform. Most notably, Montenegrin scholars reformed the Montenegrin alphabet and codified the reflexes of the "youngest" iotation ś and ź as distinct phonemes and letters, coexisting along with earlier sj/zj spellings in forms such as śekira/sjekira, śedi/sjedi, and źenica/zjenica, and preserved a number of archaic lexical and grammatical features of traditional Montenegrin usage.

Serbian, Montenegrin and Bosnian standards varieties tend to be inclusive, i.e. to accept a wider range of idioms and to use loanwords (German, Italian and Turkish), whereas the Croatian language policy is more purist and prefers neologisms to loan-words, as well as the re-use of neglected older words. Yet there is criticism of the puristic language policy even in Croatia, as exemplified by linguist Snježana Kordić.

In 2017, numerous prominent writers, scientists, journalists, activists and other public figures from Bosnia and Herzegovina, Croatia, Montenegro and Serbia signed the Declaration on the Common Language, faced with "the negative social, cultural and economic consequences of political manipulations of language in the current language policies of the four countries", which "include using language as an argument justifying the segregation of schoolchildren in some multiethnic environments, unnecessary 'translation' in administration or the media, inventing differences where they do not exist, bureaucratic coercion, as well as censorship (and necessarily also self-censorship), where linguistic expression is imposed as a criterion of ethnonational affiliation and a means of affirming political loyalty".

Despite the 'nationalisation' of the language in the four countries, "lexical differences between the ethnic variants are extremely limited, even when compared with those between closely related Slavic languages (such as standard Czech and Slovak, Bulgarian and Macedonian), and grammatical differences are even less pronounced. More importantly, complete understanding between the ethnic variants of the standard language makes translation and second language teaching impossible", which all means that it is still a pluricentric language. "An examination of all the major 'levels' of language show that BCS is clearly a single language with a single grammatical system."

== Writing ==
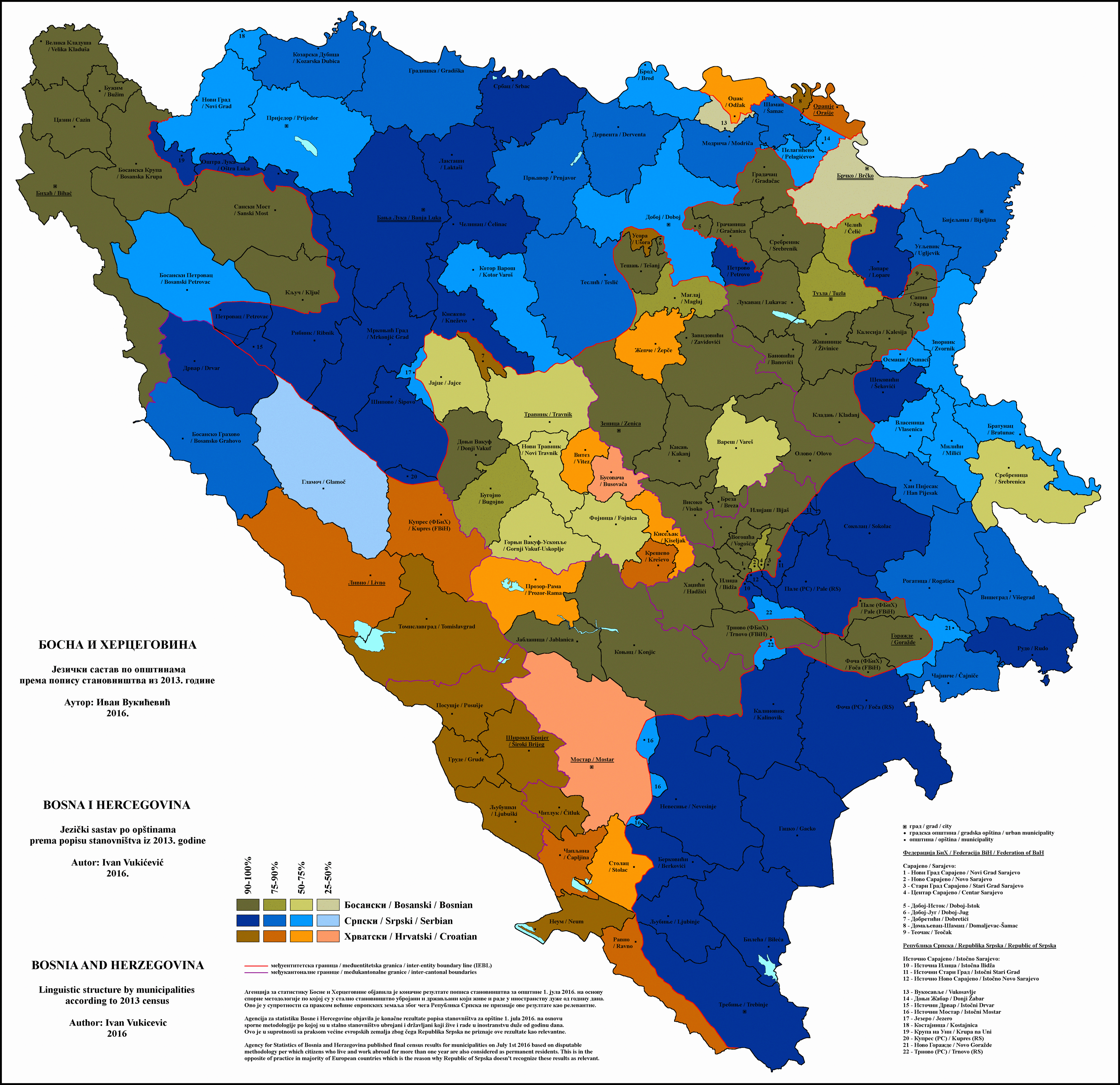
Linguistic structure of Bosnia and Herzegovina by municipalities

=== Script ===
Though all of the language variants could theoretically use either, the scripts differ:

- Bosnian and Montenegrin officially use both the Latin and Cyrillic scripts, but the Latin one is more in widespread use.
- Croatian exclusively uses the Latin alphabet.
- Serbian uses both the Cyrillic and Latin scripts. Cyrillic is the official script of the administration in Serbia and Republika Srpska, but the Latin script is the more widely used in media and especially on the Internet.

=== Phonemes ===
Three out of four standard variants have the same set of 30 regular phonemes, so the Bosnian/Croatian/Serbian Latin and Serbian Cyrillic alphabets map one to one with one another and with the phoneme inventory, while Montenegrin alphabet has 32 regular phonemes, the additional two being ⟨Ś⟩ and ⟨Ź⟩.

Some linguists analyse the yat reflexes ⟨je⟩ and ⟨ije⟩, commonly realised as [ie] in Croatian and Bosnian dialects, as a separate phoneme – "jat diphthong" – or even two phonemes, one short and one long. There are even several proposals by Croatian linguists for an orthography reform concerning these two diphthongs, but they have not been seriously considered for implementation.

The standardisation of Montenegrin in 2009 has introduced two new letters, ⟨Ś⟩ and ⟨Ź⟩, for the sounds [ɕ] and [ʑ] respectively. These are optional spellings of the digraphs ⟨sj⟩ and ⟨zj⟩. Critics argue that [ɕ] and [ʑ] are merely allophones of /sj/ and /zj/ in Herzegovinian dialects such as Montenegrin, and therefore the new letters are not required for an adequate orthography.

Most dialects of Serbia and Montenegro originally lack the phoneme /x/, instead having /j/, /v/, or nothing (silence). /x/ was introduced with language unification, and the Serbian and Montenegrin standards allow for some doublets such as snaja–snaha and hajde–ajde. However, in other words, especially those of foreign origin, ⟨h⟩ is mandatory.

In some regions of Croatia and Bosnia, the sounds for letters ⟨č⟩ (realised as [tʂ] in most other dialects) and ⟨ć⟩ [tɕ] merged or nearly merged, usually into [tʃ]. The same happened with their voiced counterparts, i.e. ⟨dž⟩ ([dʐ]) and ⟨đ⟩ ([dʑ]) merged into [dʒ]. As result, speakers of those dialects often have difficulties distinguishing these sounds.

=== Orthography ===
The Serbian variety usually phonetically transcribes foreign names and words (although both transcription and transliteration are allowed), whereas the Croatian standard usually transliterates (i.e. keeping foreign spellings intact). Bosnian and Montenegrin accept both models, but transliteration is often preferred.

Also, when the subject of the future tense is omitted, producing a reversal of the infinitive and auxiliary "ću", only the final "i" of the infinitive is orthographically elided in Croatian and Bosnian, whereas in Serbian and Montenegrin the two have merged into a single word:

- "Uradit ću to." (Croatian/Bosnian)
- "Uradiću to." (Serbian/Montenegrin)

== Phonology ==
=== Accentuation ===
In general, the Shtokavian dialects that represent the foundation of the four standard varieties have four pitch accents on stressed syllables: falling tone on a short vowel, written e.g. ⟨ı̏⟩ in dictionaries; rising tone on a short vowel, written e.g. ⟨ì⟩; falling tone on a long vowel, written e.g. ⟨î⟩; and rising tone on a long vowel, written e.g. ⟨í⟩. In addition, the following unstressed vowel may be either short, ⟨i⟩, or long, ⟨ī⟩. In declension and verb conjugation, accent shifts, both by type and position, are very frequent.

The distinction between four accents and preservation of post accent lengths is common in vernaculars of western Montenegro, Bosnia and Herzegovina, in parts of Serbia, as well as in parts of Croatia with a strong Serb presence. In addition, a distinct characteristics of some vernaculars is stress shift to proclitics, e.g. phrase u Bosni (in Bosnia) will be pronounced /ǔ bosni/ instead of /u bôsni/ as in northern parts of Serbia.

The northern vernaculars in Serbia also preserve the four-accent system, but the unstressed lengths have been shortened or disappeared in some positions. However, the shortening of post-accent lengths is in progress in all Shtokavian vernaculars, even in those most conservative in Montenegro. Stress shift to proclitics is, however, in northern Serbia rare and mostly limited to negative verb constructs (ne znam = I don't know > /nê znaːm/).

The situation in Croatia, is however, different. A large proportion of speakers of Croatian, especially those coming from Zagreb, do not distinguish between rising and falling accents. This is considered to be a feature of the Zagreb dialect, which has strong Kajkavian influence, rather than standard Croatian.

Regardless of vernacular differences, all three standard varieties exclusively promote the Neo-Shtokavian four-accentual system. Both dialects that are considered to be the basis of standard Serbian (Eastern Herzegovinian and Šumadija-Vojvodina dialects) have four accents.

=== Phonetics ===
Feature	Croatian	Bosnian	Serbian	Montenegrin	English
Opposition -u/e	burza	berza			stock exchange
Opposition -u/e	porculan	porcelan porculan	porcelan		porcelain
Opposition -u/i	tanjur	tanjir		pjat tanjir	plate
Opposition -u/o	barun	baron			baron
Opposition -u/o	krumpir	krompir			potato
Opposition -i/o(j)	ubojstvo	ubistvo			murder
Opposition -i/o(j)	djelomično	djelimično	d(j)elimično	djelimično	partially
Opposition -io/iju	milijun	milion			million
Opposition -i/je after l/t	proljev		proliv		diarrhoea
Opposition -i/je after l/t	stjecaj	stjecaj sticaj	sticaj		coincidence
Opposition -s/z	inzistirati	insistirati			insist
Opposition -s/c	financije	finansije financije	finansije		finance
Opposition -t/ć	plaća	plaća plata	plata		salary
Opposition -t/ć	sretan	sretan srećan	srećan		happy
Opposition -št/šć	korištenje		korišćenje		usage
Opposition -k/h	kor	hor			choir
Opposition -k/h	kirurg	hirurg			surgeon
Opposition -k/h	klor	hlor			chlorine
Opposition -ač/er	boksač	bokser			boxer
Opposition -ač/er	tenisač	teniser			tennis player
Opposition -l/-∅ after o	sol	so			salt
Opposition -l/-∅ after o	vol	vo			ox
Opposition -l/-∅ after o	kolčić	kočić kolčić	štap kočić	štap kočić	stick
Serbian and Montenegrin often drop or do not add initial or medial 'h'	čahura		čaura		cartridge
Serbian and Montenegrin often drop or do not add initial or medial 'h'	hrvač		rvač		wrestler
Serbian and Montenegrin often drop or do not add initial or medial 'h'	hrđa		rđa		rust
Serbian and Montenegrin drop final 'r'	jučer		juče		yesterday
Serbian and Montenegrin drop final 'r'	večer		veče		evening
Serbian and Montenegrin drop final 'r'	također		takođe		also

=== Morphology ===
There are three principal "pronunciations" (izgovori/изговори) of the Shtokavian dialect that differ in their reflexes of the Proto-Slavic vowel jat. Illustrated by the Common Slavic word for "child", dětę, they are:

- dite in the Ikavian pronunciation
- dijete in the Ijekavian pronunciation
- dete in the Ekavian pronunciation

The Serbian language recognises Ekavian and Ijekavian as equally valid pronunciations, whereas Croatian, Montenegrin and Bosnian accept only the Ijekavian pronunciation. In Bosnia and Herzegovina (regardless of the official language) and in Montenegro, the Ijekavian pronunciation is used almost exclusively.

Ikavian pronunciation is nonstandard, and is limited to dialectal use in Dalmatia, Lika, Istria, central Bosnia (area between Vrbas and Bosna), Western Herzegovina, Bosanska Krajina, Slavonia and northern Bačka (Vojvodina). So, for example:

English	Ekavian	Ijekavian	Ikavian
wind	vetar	vjetar	vitar
milk	mleko	mlijeko	mliko
to want	hteti	htjeti	htiti
arrow	strela	strijela	strila
German language	nemački jezik	njemački jezik	
But:
small arrow	strelica	strelica/strjelica	strilica
crossing	prelaz	prelaz/prijelaz	prilaz

A few Croatian linguists have tried to explain the following differences in morphological structure for some words, with the introduction of a new vowel, "jat diphthong". This is not the opinion of most linguists.

Sometimes this leads to confusion: Serbian and Montenegrin poticati (to stem from) is in Croatian and Bosnian "to encourage". Croatian and Bosnian "to stem from" is potjecati, whereas Serbian and Montenegrin for "encourage" is podsticati.

English	Croatian	Bosnian	Serbian	Montenegrin
add by pouring	dolijevati		dolivati	
diarrhea	proljev		proliv	
gulf, bay	zaljev		zaliv	
to influence	utjecati		uticati	

Standard Bosnian allows both variants, and ambiguities are resolved by preferring the Croatian variant; this is a general practice for Serbian–Croatian ambiguities.

The phoneme /x/ (written as h) has been volatile in eastern South Slavic dialects. In Serbian, Montenegrin and some Croatian dialects (including some of those in Slavonia), it has been replaced with /j/, /v/, or elided, and subsequent standardisation sanctioned those forms:

English	Croatian	Bosnian	Serbian	Montenegrin
ear	uho		uvo uho	
fly	muha		muva	
to cook	kuhati		kuvati	
sister-in-law	snaha		snaja	snaha snaja
rust	hrđa		rđa	
to wrestle	hrvati		rvati	

However, /x/ and /f/ have been kept in many words as a distinct feature of Bosnian speech and language tradition, particularly under influence of Turkish and Arabic, and even introduced in some places where it etymologically did not exist.

In traditional Bosnian usage, /x/ is considered standard in several environments, such as in:

- inherited Slavic words where it is etymologically justified
- in loanwords of Oriental and Greek origin

Those forms were in the mid 1990s also accepted in the orthography of the Bosnian language. However, 2018, in the new issue of the Orthography of the Bosnian language, words without the phoneme /x/ (written as "h") are accepted due to their prevalence in language practice.

English	Bosnian	Croatian	Montenegrin	Serbian
easy	lahko lako (allowed)	lako		
soft	mehko meko (allowed)	meko		
coffee	kahva kava (allowed) kafa (allowed)	kava	kafa	
balm	mehlem melem	melem		
sheet	čaršaf čaršav (allowed)	plahta čaršav	čaršav čaršaf	čaršav
cage	kafez kavez	kavez		
moulder	truhnuti trunuti (allowed)	trunuti		
defect	mana mahana (allowed)	mana		
scarf	rubac mahrama marama	rubac marama	marama	
date(fruit)	hurma	datulja	urma	
tobacco	duhan		duvan	
melancholy	melanholija	melankolija	melanholija	

Because the Ijekavian pronunciation is common to all official standards, it will be used for examples on this page. Other than this, examples of different morphology are:

English	Croatian	Bosnian	Serbian (Ijekavian)	Montenegrin
point	točka	tačka		
correct	točno	tačno		
municipality	općina	općina opština (colloquial)	opština	
priest	svećenik	svećenik (for Catholic priests) svještenik (for Orthodox priests)	svještenik	
female student (at college)	studentica		studentkinja	
female professor	profesorica		profesorica profesorka	
scientist	znanstvenik	naučnik znanstvenik	naučnik	
translator	prevoditelj	prevodilac prevoditelj		
reader	čitatelj	čitatelj čitalac	čitalac čitatelj	
But:
assembly	skupština			
thinker	mislilac			
diver	ronilac			
teacher	nastavnik učitelj			
male professor	profesor			
writer	pisac spisatelj			
female writer	spisateljica spisateljka			
duchess	vojvotkinja			

== Grammar ==
=== Pronouns ===
In Serbian, Montenegrin and Bosnian, the pronoun what is što when used as a relative, but šta when used as an interrogative; the latter applies also to relative sentences with interrogative meaning. Croatian uses što in all contexts (but in colloquial speech, "šta" is often used).

English	Croatian	Bosnian, Montenegrin and Serbian
What did he say?	Što je rekao?	Šta je rekao?
Ask him what he said.	Pitaj ga što je rekao.	Pitaj ga šta je rekao.
What he said was a lie.	To što je rekao je laž.	

This is applicable only to the nominative and the accusative – in all other cases, the standards have the same forms: čega, čemu etc. for što.

In Croatian, the pronoun who has the form tko, whereas in Serbian, Bosnian and Montenegrin it has ko, but again, in colloquial speech, the initial "t" is usually omitted. The declension is the same: kome, koga, etc. In addition, Croatian uses komu as an alternative form in the dative case.

The locative pronoun kamo is only used in Croatian:

English	Croatian	Bosnian and Serbian (Ijekavian)	Montenegrin
Where will you be?	Gdje ćeš biti?	Gdje ćeš biti? Gdje ćeš da budeš?	Đe ćeš biti? Đe ćeš da budeš?
Where will you go?	Kamo ćeš ići? Kuda ćeš ići?	Gdje ćeš ići? Gdje ćeš da ideš? Kuda ćeš ići? Kuda ćeš da ideš?	Đe ćeš ići? Đe ćeš da ideš?

=== Syntax ===
==== Infinitive versus subjunctive ====
With modal verbs such as ht(j)eti (want) or moći (can), the infinitive is prescribed in Croatian, whereas the construction da (that/to) + present tense is preferred in Serbian and Montenegrin. This subjunctive of sorts is possibly an influence of the Balkan sprachbund. Again, both alternatives are present and allowed in Bosnian (the first one is preferred in orthography, the latter is more common in colloquial language).

Here is an example of a yat reflection that is the same in everything but the syntax: The sentence "I want to do that" could be translated with any of

- Hoću to da uradim.
- Hoću to učiniti.

This difference partly extends to the future tense, which in Serbo-Croatian is formed in a similar manner to English, using (elided) present of verb "ht(j)eti" → "hoću"/"hoćeš"/… > "ću"/"ćeš"/… as auxiliary verb. Here, the infinitive is formally required in both variants:

- Ja ću to uraditi. (I shall do that.)

However, when da+present is used instead, it can additionally express the subject's will or intention to perform the action:

- Ja ću to da uradim. (I will do that.)

This form is more frequently used in Serbia, Montenegro and Bosnia. The nuances in meaning between the three constructs can be slight or even lost (especially in Serbian dialects), in similar manner as the shall/will distinction varies across English dialects. Overuse of da+present is regarded as Germanism in Serbian linguistic circles, and it can occasionally lead to awkward sentences.

==== Interrogative constructs ====
In interrogative and relative constructs, standard Croatian prescribes using the interrogative participle li after the verb, whereas standard Serbian also allows forms with da li. (A similar situation exists in French, where a question can be formed either by inversion or using est-ce que, and can be stretched in English with modal verbs):

- Možeš li? (Can you?) (Croatian)
- Both Možeš li? and Da li možeš? (Can you, Do you can?) are common in Serbian.

In addition, non-standard je li ("Is it?"), usually elided to je l' , is vernacular for forming all kinds of questions, e.g. Je l' možeš?. In standard language, it is used only in questions involving auxiliary verb je (="is"):

- Je li moguće? (Is it possible?) (Croatian)
- Both Je li moguće? and Da li je moguće? are common in Serbian.

In summary, the English sentence "I want to know whether I'll start working" would typically read:

- Želim da znam da li ću da počnem da radim. (spoken Serbian)
- Želim znati hoću li početi raditi. (spoken Croatian)

although many in-between combinations could be met in vernacular speech, depending on speaker's dialect, idiolect, or even mood.

The Croatian avoidance of da li is largely an expression of prescriptivism. In everyday speech in Croatia, da li is used, in fact, extensively, but avoided in written language.

==== Trebati ====
In formal Croatian, verb trebati (need or should) is transitive, as in English. In Serbian, Montenegrin and Bosnian, it is impersonal, like the French il faut, or the English construct is necessary (to); the grammatical subject is either omitted (it), or presents the object of needing; the person that needs something is an indirect grammatical object, in the dative case. The latter usage is, however, also encountered in Croatian, especially in spoken form.):

Serbian, Montenegrin and Bosnian	English (literal trans.)	Croatian	English
Petru treba novac.	To Peter is necessary money.	Petar treba novac.	Peter needs money.
Ne trebaš mi.	You are not necessary to me.	Ne trebam te.	I do not need you.
Ne trebam ti.	I am not necessary to you.	Ne trebaš me.	You do not need me.
Treba da radim.	It is necessary that I work.	Trebam raditi.	I need to work.

== Vocabulary ==
=== Examples ===
The greatest differences between the standards is in vocabulary. However, most words are well understood, and even occasionally used, in the other standards. In most cases, common usage favours one variant and the other(s) are regarded as "imported", archaic, dialectal, or simply more rarely used.

English	Croatian	Bosnian	Serbian(Ekavian)	Montenegrin
one thousand	tisuća	hiljada		
history	povijest	historija	istorija	istorija povijest (allowed)
January	siječanj	januar		
factory	tvornica	fabrika tvornica	fabrika	
rice	riža		pirinač riža	
carrot	mrkva	mrkva šargarepa	šargarepa	šargarepa mrkva
neighbour	susjed	komšija susjed	komšija sused	komšija susjed
trousers	hlače	hlače pantalone gaće (allowed)	pantalone	pantalone gaće
music	glazba	muzika		
library	knjižnica	biblioteka		
airport	zračna luka aerodrom	aerodrom		
bread	kruh	hljeb kruh	hleb	hljeb
millennium	tisućljeće milenij	milenijum tisućljeće	milenijum	
paternal uncle	stric	amidža stric	stric čika	stric
century	stoljeće	vijek stoljeće	vek stoleće	vijek
decade	desetljeće	decenija desetljeće	decenija desetleće	decenija
week	tjedan	sedmica	nedelja	neđelja
spinach	špinat	špinat spanać	spanać	
football	nogomet	nogomet fudbal	fudbal	
train	vlak	voz vlak	voz	
wave	val	talas val (allowed)		talas val
courtyard	dvorište	avlija dvorište	dvorište	
person	osoba	osoba lice		
uncivil	neodgojen	neodgojen nevaspitan	nevaspitan	
one's own	osobno vlastito	osobno vlastito sopstveno	sopstveno vlastito lično	
road	cesta put		put	cesta put
road toll	cestarina	cestarina putarina	putarina	
dad	tata	babo tata	tata	
tomato	rajčica	paradajz		
to accept	prihvaćati	prihvaćati prihvatati	prihvatati	
happy lucky	sretan	srećan sretan	srećan	
to comprehend	shvaćati	shvaćati shvatati	shvatati	
But:
mom	mama			
handball	rukomet			
to catch	hvatati			

Note that there are only a few differences that can cause confusion, for example the verb "ličiti" means "to look like" in Serbian, Montenegrin and Bosnian, but in Croatian it is "sličiti"; "ličiti" means "to paint (a house)". However, "ličiti" is often used Croatian in the meaning of "to look like".

The word "bilo" means "white" in the Ikavian accent, "pulse" in official Croatian, and "was" in all official languages, although it is not so confusing when pronounced because of different accentuation (bîlo or bílo = white, bı̏lo = pulse, bílo = was).

In Serbian, Montenegrin and Bosnian, the word izvanredan (extraordinary) has only the positive meaning (excellent), vanredan being used for "unusual" or "out of order"; however, only izvanredan is used in Croatian in both contexts.

Also note that in most cases Bosnian officially allows almost all of the listed variants in the name of "language richness", and ambiguities are resolved by preferring the Croatian variant. Bosnian vocabulary writers based their decisions on usage of certain words in literary works by Bosnian authors.

==== Names of the months ====
The months have Slavic-derived names in Croatian, wheres Serbian and Bosnian have almost the same set of Latin-derived names as English. The Slavic-derived names may also be used in Bosnian, but the Latinate names are preferred.

English	Croatian	Bosnian	Serbian	Montenegrin
January	siječanj	januar		
February	veljača	februar		
March	ožujak	mart		
April	travanj	april		
May	svibanj	maj		
June	lipanj	juni	jun	
July	srpanj	juli	jul(i)	jul
August	kolovoz	august	avgust	
September	rujan	septembar		
October	listopad	oktobar		
November	studeni	novembar		
December	prosinac	decembar		

The Latin-derived names of the months are well understood in Croatia and are used in several fixed expressions such as Prvi Maj (1st May), Prvi April (April Fools' Day) or Oktobarska revolucija (October Revolution).

In spoken Croatian and in western Bosnia it is common to refer to a month by its number. Therefore, many speakers refer to the month of May as peti mjesec ("the fifth month"). Saying sedmi peti or sedmi petog (seventh of fifth) would be the equivalent of 7th May.

=== Internationalisms ===
Also many internationalisms and transliterations are different:

English	Croatian	Bosnian	Serbian	Montenegrin
to organise	organizirati		organizovati	
to construct	konstruirati	konstruirati konstruisati	konstruisati	
But:
to analyse	analizirati			

(cf. German organisieren, konstruieren, analysieren)

Historically, modern-age internationalisms entered Bosnian and Croatian mostly through German and Italian, Montenegrin mostly through Italian, whereas they entered Serbian through French and Russian, so different localisation patterns were established based on those languages. Also, Greek borrowings came to Serbian directly, but through Latin into Croatian:

English	Croatian	Bosnian	Serbian	Montenegrin	Note
Armenia	Armenija		Jermenija		Through Latin and Venetian in Croatian and Montenegrin, through Greek and French in Serbian, and through Turkish in Bosnian.
Athens	Atena	Atina			Through Latin and Venetian in Croatian and Montenegrin, through Greek and French in Serbian, and through Turkish in Bosnian.
Crete	Kreta	Krit			Through Latin and Venetian in Croatian and Montenegrin, through Greek and French in Serbian, and through Turkish in Bosnian.
Cyprus	Cipar	Kipar			Through Latin and Venetian in Croatian and Montenegrin, through Greek and French in Serbian, and through Turkish in Bosnian.
Europe	Europa	Evropa			Through Latin and Venetian in Croatian and Montenegrin, through Greek and French in Serbian, and through Turkish in Bosnian.
Jerusalem	Jeruzalem	Jerusalem	Jerusalim		Through Latin and Venetian in Croatian and Montenegrin, through Greek and French in Serbian, and through Turkish in Bosnian.
Latvia	Latvija		Letonija	Latvija	Through Latin and Venetian in Croatian and Montenegrin, through Greek and French in Serbian, and through Turkish in Bosnian.
Lithuania	Litva	Litvanija			Through Latin and Venetian in Croatian and Montenegrin, through Greek and French in Serbian, and through Turkish in Bosnian.
Portugal	Portugal		Portugalija(Traditional); Portugal(Allowed)	Portugal	Through Latin and Venetian in Croatian and Montenegrin, through Greek and French in Serbian, and through Turkish in Bosnian.
Romania	Rumunjska	Rumunija			Through Latin and Venetian in Croatian and Montenegrin, through Greek and French in Serbian, and through Turkish in Bosnian.
Spain	Španjolska	Španija			Through Latin and Venetian in Croatian and Montenegrin, through Greek and French in Serbian, and through Turkish in Bosnian.
The Netherlands	Nizozemska	Holandija			Ultimately through Old Dutch holt lant (whence English Holland) in Bosnian, Serbian and Montenegrin, and, alongside other Slavic languages such as Czech and Slovene, as a calque of or a parallel formation to Dutch Nederland in Croatian
Anatolia	Anatolija	Anadolija		Anatolija	
diplomacy	diplomacija	diplomacija diplomatija	diplomatija		
impedance	impedancija	impedanca	impedansa	impedancija	All from French impédance, Italianised ending in Croatian and Montenegrin (cf. impedenza); ultimately from Latin impedientia.
Italian language	talijanski jezik	italijanski jezik		talijanski jezik italijanski jezik	
Spanish language	španjolski jezik	španski jezik			
Slovene language	slovenski jezik		slovenački jezik	slovenski jezik slovenački jezik	'slovenački jezik' is used in varieties where 'slovenski jezik' denotes a 'Slavic language'; varieties that use 'slovenski jezik' to denote the 'Slovene language' use 'slavenski jezik' for 'Slavic language' instead
Slavic language	slavenski jezik		slovenski jezik	slavenski jezik	'slovenački jezik' is used in varieties where 'slovenski jezik' denotes a 'Slavic language'; varieties that use 'slovenski jezik' to denote the 'Slovene language' use 'slavenski jezik' for 'Slavic language' instead
certificate	certifikat		sertifikat		All from Latin certificatum, Frenchised beginning in Serbian and Montenegrin (cf. certificat).
But:
license licence	licenca dozvola				Through Latin licentia and tendentia in both, though the secondary varieties are more commonly used
tendency	tendencija sklonost				Through Latin licentia and tendentia in both, though the secondary varieties are more commonly used
Corfu	Krf				
Italy	Italija				
Naples	Napulj				

Most of terms for chemical elements are different: for international names, Bosnian and Croatian use -ij where Serbian and Montenegrin have -ijum (uranij–uranijum). In some native names, Croatian has -ik where Serbian and Montenegrin have -(o)nik (kisik–kiseonik "oxygen", vodik–vodonik "hydrogen"), and Bosnian accepts all variants. Yet others are totally different (dušik–azot 'nitrogen', kositar–kalaj 'tin'). Some element names are the same: srebro (silver), zlato (gold), bakar (copper). Some other imported words differ by grammatical gender, feminine words having an -a suffix and masculine words having a zero-suffix:

English	Croatian	Bosnian	Serbian	Montenegrin
minute (n.)	minuta	minuta minut (allowed)	minut	
second (n.)	sekunda		sekund	
But:
territory	teritorij	teritorija		
mystery	misterij	misterija		
planet	planet	planeta		
comet	komet	kometa		
But:
rocket	raketa			

== Miscellanea ==
- Pronunciation and vocabulary differs among dialects spoken within Serbia, Croatia, Montenegro and Bosnia themselves. Each larger region has its own pronunciation and it is reasonably easy to guess where a speaker is from by their accent and/or vocabulary. Colloquial vocabulary can be particularly different from the official standards.

This is one of the arguments for claiming it is all one and the same language: there are more differences within the territories of the official languages themselves than there are between the standards (all four of which are based on the same Neo-Štokavian dialect). This is not surprising, of course, for if the lines between the varieties were drawn not politically but linguistically, then there would be no borders at all. As Pavle Ivić explains, the continuous migration of Slavic populations during the five hundred years of Turkish rule has scattered the local dialects all around.

- When Bosniaks, Croats, Montenegrins and Serbs talk amongst each other, the other speakers usually understand them completely, save for the odd word, and quite often, they will know what that means (much as with British and American English speakers). Nevertheless, when communicating with each other, there is a habit to use terms that are familiar to everyone, with the intent to avoid not being understood and/or confusion. For example, to avoid confusion with the names of the months, they can be referred to as the "first month", "second month" and so on, or the Latin-derived names can be used if "first month" itself is ambiguous, which makes it perfectly understandable for everyone. In Serbia, the names of the months are the same Latin-derived names as in English so again they are understandable for anyone who knows English or another Western European language.

== Language samples ==
The following samples, taken from article 1 to 6 of the Universal Declaration of Human Rights, are "synonymous texts, translated as literally as possible" in the sense of Ammon designed to demonstrate the differences between the standard varieties treated in this article in a continuous text. However, even when there is a different translation, it does not necessarily mean that the words or expression from other languages do not exist in a respective language, e.g. the words osoba and pravni subjekt exist in all languages, but in this context, the word osoba is preferred in Croatian and Bosnian and the word pravni subjekt is favored in Serbian and Montenegrin. The word vjeroispovijest is mentioned just in the Montenegrin translation, but the same word exists in other standard varieties too—albeit in Serbian in the Ekavian variant veroispovest.

Croatian	Bosnian	Serbian	Montenegrin	English
Opća deklaracija o pravima čovjeka	Opća deklaracija o pravima čovjeka	Opšta deklaracija o pravima čov(j)eka	Univerzalna deklaracija o ljudskim pravima	Universal Declaration of Human Rights
Članak 1. Sva ljudska bića rađaju se slobodna i jednaka u dostojanstvu i pravima. Ona su obdarena razumom i sviješću i trebaju jedno prema drugome postupati u duhu bratstva.	Član 1. Sva ljudska bića rađaju se slobodna i jednaka u dostojanstvu i pravima. Ona su obdarena razumom i sviješću i treba da jedno prema drugome postupaju u duhu bratstva.	Član 1. Sva ljudska bića rađaju se slobodna i jednaka u dostojanstvu i pravima. Ona su obdarena razumom i sv(ij)ešću i treba da jedno prema drugome postupaju u duhu bratstva.	Član 1. Sva ljudska bića rađaju se slobodna i jednaka u dostojanstvu i pravima. Ona su obdarena razumom i savješću i jedni prema drugima treba da postupaju u duhu bratstva.	Article 1. All human beings are born free and equal in dignity and rights. They are endowed with reason and conscience and should act towards one another in a spirit of brotherhood.
Članak 2. Svakome su dostupna sva prava i slobode navedene u ovoj Deklaraciji bez razlike bilo koje vrste, kao što su rasa, boja, spol, jezik, vjera, političko ili drugo mišljenje, nacionalno ili društveno podrijetlo, imovina, rođenje ili drugi pravni položaj. Nadalje, ne smije se činiti bilo kakva razlika na osnovi političkog, pravnog ili međunarodnog položaja zemlje ili područja kojima neka osoba pripada, bilo da je to područje neovisno, pod starateljstvom, nesamoupravno, ili da se nalazi pod bilo kojim drugim ograničenjima suverenosti.	Član 2. Svakome su dostupna sva prava i slobode navedene u ovoj Deklaraciji bez razlike bilo koje vrste, kao što su rasa, boja, spol, jezik, vjera, političko ili drugo mišljenje, narodnosno ili društveno porijeklo, imovina, rođenje ili drugi pravni položaj. Nadalje, ne smije se činiti bilo kakva razlika na osnovu političkog, pravnog ili međunarodnog položaja zemlje ili područja kojima neka osoba pripada, bilo da je ovo područje nezavisno, pod starateljstvom, nesamoupravno, ili da se nalazi ma pod kojim drugim ograničenjima suverenosti.	Član 2. Svakome su dostupna sva prava i slobode navedene u ovoj Deklaraciji bez razlike bilo koje vrste, kao što su rasa, boja, pol, jezik, v(j)era, političko ili drugo mišljenje, narodnosno ili društveno por(ij)eklo, imovina, rođenje ili drugi pravni položaj. Nadalje, ne sm(ij)e da se čini bilo kakva razlika na osnovu političkog, pravnog ili međunarodnog položaja zemlje ili područja kojima neko lice pripada, bilo da je ovo područje nezavisno, pod starateljstvom, nesamoupravno, ili da se nalazi ma pod kojim drugim ograničenjima suverenosti.	Član 2. Svakom pripadaju sva prava i slobode proglašene u ovoj Deklaraciji bez ikakvih razlika u pogledu rase, boje, pola, jezika, vjeroispovijesti, političkog ili drugog mišljenja, nacionalnog ili društvenog porijekla, imovine, rođenja ili drugih okolnosti. Dalje, neće se praviti nikakva razlika na osnovu političkog, pravnog ili međunarodnog statusa zemlje ili teritorije kojoj neko lice pripada, bilo da je ona nezavisna, pod starateljstvom, nesamoupravna, ili da joj je suverenost na ma koji drugi način ograničena.	Article 2. Everyone is entitled to all the rights and freedoms set forth in this Declaration, without distinction of any kind, such as race, colour, sex, language, religion, political or other opinion, national or social origin, property, birth or other status. Furthermore, no distinction shall be made on the basis of the political, jurisdictional or international status of the country or territory to which a person belongs, whether it be independent, trust, non-self-governing or under any other limitation of sovereignty.
Članak 3. Svatko ima pravo na život, slobodu i osobnu sigurnost.	Član 3. Svako ima pravo na život, slobodu i osobnu sigurnost.	Član 3. Svako ima pravo na život, slobodu i ličnu bezb(j)ednost.	Član 3. Svako ima pravo na život, slobodu i bezbijednost ličnosti.	Article 3. Everyone has the right to life, liberty and security of person.
Članak 4. Nitko ne smije biti držan u ropstvu ili ropskom odnosu; ropstvo i trgovina robljem zabranjuju se u svim svojim oblicima.	Član 4. Niko ne smije biti držan u ropstvu ili ropskom odnosu; ropstvo i trgovina robljem zabranjuje se u svim njihovim oblicima.	Član 4. Niko ne sm(ij)e da bude držan u ropstvu ili ropskom odnosu; ropstvo i trgovina robljem zabranjuje se u svim njihovim formama.	Član 4. Niko se ne smije držati u ropstvu ili potčinjenosti: ropstvo i trgovina robljem zabranjeni su u svim svojim oblicima.	Article 4. No one shall be held in slavery or servitude; slavery and the slave trade shall be prohibited in all their forms.
Članak 5. Nitko ne smije biti podvrgnut mučenju ili okrutnom, nečovječnom ili ponižavajućem postupku ili kažnjavanju.	Član 5. Niko ne smije biti podvrgnut mučenju ili okrutnom, nečovječnom ili ponižavajućem postupku ili kažnjavanju.	Član 5. Niko ne sm(ij)e da bude podvrgnut mučenju ili okrutnom, nečov(j)ečnom ili ponižavajućem postupku ili kažnjavanju.	Član 5. Niko se ne smije podvrgnuti mučenju ili svirepom, nečovječnom ili ponižavajućem postupku ili kažnjavanju.	Article 5. No one shall be subjected to torture or to cruel, inhuman or degrading treatment or punishment.
Članak 6. Svatko ima pravo da se svagdje pred zakonom priznaje kao osoba.	Član 6. Svako ima pravo da se svugdje pred zakonom priznaje kao osoba.	Član 6. Svako ima pravo da svuda bude priznat kao pravni subjekt.	Član 6. Svako ima pravo da svuda bude priznat kao pravni subjekt.	Article 6. Everyone has the right to recognition everywhere as a person before the law.

== See also ==
- Abstand and ausbau languages
- Controversy over ethnic and linguistic identity in Montenegro
- Declaration on the Common Language
- Declaration on the Status and Name of the Croatian Literary Language
- South Slavic dialect continuum
- Language secessionism in Serbo-Croatian
- Mutual intelligibility
- Serbo-Croatian phonology
