= Batalo =

14th century Bosnian nobleman

Gospodin Batalo Šantić
- Knyaz

Tepčija
- Reign: 1392–1404
- Predecessor: Milat
- Successor: Sladoje
- Born: before 1391 unknown
- Died: 1404
- Buried: Crkvine, Turbe
- Noble family: Šantić noble family
- Spouse: Resa Vukčić
- Issue: Vuk, Stefan i Ostoja Tepčić
- Father: unknown, probably Dragoš Šantić
- Memorials: 44.2386°N 17.5719°E Mausoleum and the crypt at the hill Crkvine, Turbe (Travnik)

Batalo Šantić (Serbian Cyrillic: Батало Шантић; before 1391–1404), who is simply known as Batalo, in some research also Batal, was a medieval Bosnian nobleman from Lašva. He was the holder of the medieval Bosnian title of "tepčija". In Medieval Bosnia the title of tepčija appeared some time during 13th century and was in use until second half of the 14th century. The function of a tepčija was to oversee the country's feudal estates.

== Life ==
Batalo belonged to a medieval Bosnian Šantić family, who were lords of Lašva region. He married Resa Vukčić of the Vukčić noble family, cadet branch of Hrvatinić, and sister of Bosnian Grand Duke, Hrvoje Vukčić, and had three sons, Vuk, Stefan and Ostoja, who were known by their last name Šantić or Tepčić. Marrying the sister of the Bosnian Grand Duke elevated Batalo's status and gave him lordship over the medieval Sana region, or at least over some of its parts and gave him and his family the title Prince of Split. His seat was at the fortress of Toričan, above the contemporary Varošluk village near Travnik. He was the great-granduncle of Matija Vojsalić (Titular King of Bosnia).

The first mention of Batalo is found in a deed issued by King Stjepan Dabiša to the government of Dubrovnik, and dated 17 July 1392. In it, Batalo was named in it as a witness to the deed in capacity of tepčija. He was also, among others, a major influence at Bosnian Court and an adviser to Bosnian rulers from late 14th century, as well as a confidant of duke Hrvoje Vukčić. Batalo was also recognized by historians as one of the many other major Bosnian noblemen, who were followers of the Bosnian Church.

== Batalo's Gospel ==
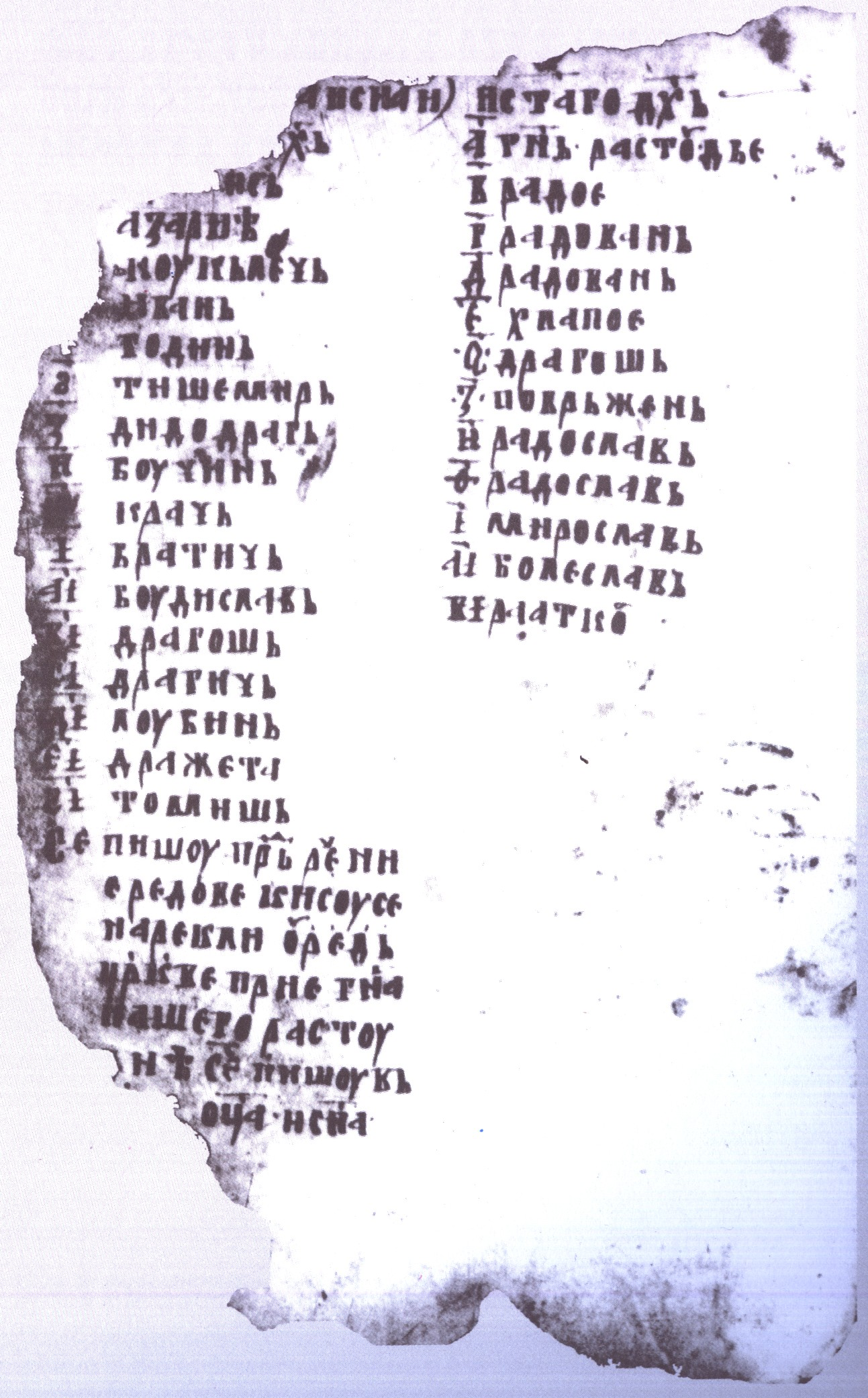
Rastudije's Order with a list of Bosnian Church Djed

Batalo's Gospel is dated to 1393. The gospel was written by the scribe (in medieval Bosnia called dijak) Stanko Kromirijanin. The tepčija Batalo Šantić was the scribe's patron. Four pages of the gospel are preserved, and are held in National Library of Russia in Saint Petersburg. On the third preserved page the scribe Stanko states that he was writing an ornate gospel for Batalo, dating its completion to 1393, two years after Tvrtko I death, during the reign of Dabiša. Here we also learn about his fortress Toričan, and his dominion over Sana, as well as name of his wife, Resa of Bosnia, sister of Grand Duke of Bosnia, Hrvoje Vukčić.

On page two, there is a list of djed of the Bosnian Church. Researchers call this list „Red gospodina Rastudija“ (Order of Bishop Rastudije) and is understood as a list of names of all Bosnian Church bishops before and after him.

== Tepčija ==
There were two, maybe even three levels of the office: the "Veliki Tepčija" (Grand), "Tepčija" and "Mali Tepčija" (Lower). "Veliki Tepčija" took care of the royal estates and held office at the ruler's (Ban, later King) court. "Tepčija", if there was "Lower Tepčija", administrated of all major feudal estates except that which belonged to the Court, where "Lower Tepčija" would than take care of rest of the land.

== Batalo's mausoleum ==
Designations

KONS of Bosnia and Herzegovina
- Official name: Batal's grave in Turbe near Travnik, the archaeological site
- Type: Category I cultural-historical and natural monument
- Criteria: A, B, C iv.v.vi., D i., G i.ii.iv.v., H i.
- Designated: 25 January 2005 (session no.-)
- Reference no.: 2531
- Decision no.: 05/1-2-284/05-3
- Has parts: -
- List: List of National Monuments of Bosnia and Herzegovina

Batalo's mausoleum with a crypt (44.2386°N 17.5719°E) was discovered in 1915 by Captain Teplý of the Austro-Hungarian army, on a hill called Crkvine. The Crkvine locality is multi-layered archaeological site, with cultural and historical continuity dating back to the Neolithic, through early Roman and late antiquity, to end of the 14th century.

At the entrance large block of limestone called a stećak. Frontal stone plate, dimension 17 x 24 cm, carried inscription in Bosančica:

Original in Bosančica script: Асє ʌєжн ɣӡʍожɴн ʍɣж mєпvнѣɖ Бɖmɖʌо ɖ пнɖ РɖΔоʍнʌ Δнѣɖк.
Transliterated into Latin script: Ase leži] uzmo [žni] muž' t [ep']čija Batal[o] bosan'ski a pisa Radomil' dijak'.
Translated into English: Here lies mighty man Bosnian tepčija Batalo so is written by Radomil the dijak*.

- dijak=scribe, and / or apprentice, disciple

=== Status and protection ===
Sometime between WWI and WWII a church was built near the tomb, but was demolished during the WWII, and in 1970 it was again built on the remaining foundations. The structure was declared a national monument in Bosnia and Hercegovina. This was confirmed on 25 January 2005 by KONS declared mausoleum, archaeological site and movable property, found and stored in National Museum of Bosnia and Herzegovina, a National Monument of Bosnia and Herzegovina.

== Literature ==
- Amir Kliko, Tepčija Batalo, gospodar župa Sane i Lašve, Divan 45, časopis Bošnjačke zajednice kulture "Preporod", Općinsko društvo Travnik, 2004.
- Blagojević, M., Tepčija, Leksikon srpskog srednjeg veka, Knowledge, Beograd, 1999.,728.
- Truhelka, dr. Ćiro i Patsch, dr. Karlo, Iskopine u dolini Lašve 1893, Glasnik Zemaljskog muzeja u Sarajevu V, Sarajevo, 1893., 685.-707.
- Truhelka, dr. Ćiro, Grobnica bosanskog tepčije Batala, obretena kod Gornjeg Turbeta (Kotar Travnik), Glasnik Zemaljskog muzeja u Sarajevu XXVII, 1915., 365. -374.
- Petrović, Jozo, Lubanja (calvarium) i dijelovi kostura bosanskoga velmože Batala, Glasnik Zemaljskog muzeja u Sarajevu XXXV, Sarajevo, 1923., 177. – 182.
- Mandić, Mihovil, Turbe kod Travnika, Glasnik Zemaljskog muzeja u Sarajevu XXXVI, Sarajevo, 1924., 83. – 903.
- Petrović, Jozo, S arheologom kroz Travnik, posebni otisak iz VI knjige "Narodne starine", Zagreb, 1931.
- Sergejevski, Dušan, Kasno-antički mauzolej u Turbetu, Glasnik Zemaljskog muzeja u Sarajevu VI, 1951., 135.-145.
- Korošec, Josip, Neolitska naseobina na Crkvinama u Turbetu kod Travnika, Glasnik Zemaljskog muzeja u Sarajevu XII, Sarajevo, 1957., 5. – 18.
- Mazalić, Đoko, Konzervatorski zahvat na Batalovoj grobnici i njezin današnji izgled, "Naše starine" VI, Sarajevo, 1959., 239.-242.
- Bešlagić, Šefik, Stećci, kataloško-topografski pregled, Sarajevo, 1971., 142.-143.
- Blagojević, M., Tepčije u srednjovekovnoj Srbiji, Bosni i Hrvatskoj, Istorijski glasnik, 1–2, Beograd, 1976., 7.-47.
- Bešlagić, Šefik, Stećci-kultura i umjetnost, Sarajevo, 1982., 49.-50,116.
- Maslić, Fatima, Starine i muzeji Travnika, Turistički savez Travnik, Zagreb, 1990.
- Vrana, Vladimir, Književna nastojanja u sredovječnoj Bosni, Povijest Bosne i Hercegovine, knjiga I, HKD "Napredak", Sarajevo, 1942. – 1991., 794.-822.

== See also ==
- List of National Monuments of Bosnia and Herzegovina
- Bosnian Church
- Stećak
