= Bosnian Church =

Christian church in medieval Bosnia

- Crkva bosanska
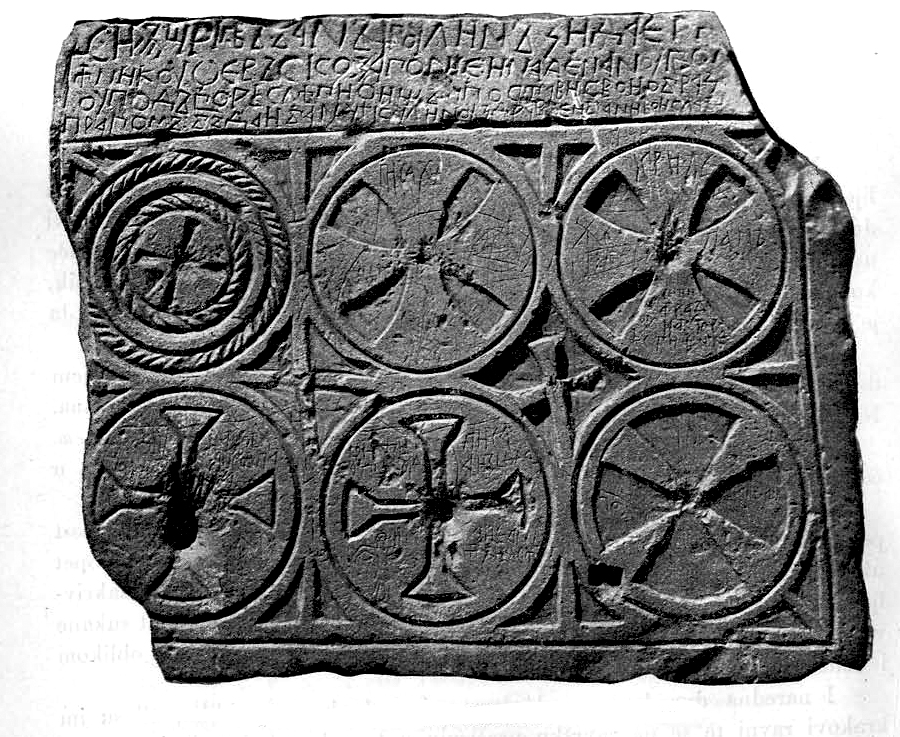
- Ban Kulin's tablet
- Classification: Chalcedonian Christianity
- Governance: Episcopal
- Language: Proto-Serbo-Croatian
- Territory: Banate, Kingdom of Bosnia
- Independence: mid–13th century
- Defunct: 1461

The Bosnian Church (Serbo-Croatian: Crkva bosanska, Црква босанска) was an autonomous Christian church in 13th–15th century Bosnia. There were several campaigns, crusades and inquisitions against heresy in Bosnia by the Pope and King of Hungary. Historians traditionally connected the church with the Bogomils, although this connection has been challenged and is now rejected by the majority of scholars. Adherents of the church called themselves simply Krstjani ("Christians") or Dobri Bošnjani ("Good Bosnians"). The church's organisation and beliefs are poorly understood, because few if any records were left by church members; the church is mostly known from Catholic anti-heretical writings.

The monumental tombstones called stećak that appeared in medieval Bosnia, as well as Croatia, Serbia, and Montenegro, are sometimes identified with the Bosnian Church.

== Background ==
=== Christianization and East–West Schism ===
Christian missions from Rome and Constantinople were sent into the Balkans in the 9th century, Christianizing the South Slavs, and establishing boundaries between the ecclesiastical jurisdictions of the See of Rome and the See of Constantinople. The East–West Schism then led to the establishment of Catholicism in Croatia proper and most of Dalmatia, while Eastern Orthodoxy came to prevail in Serbia. Lying in-between, the mountainous Bosnia proper was nominally under Rome, but Catholicism never became firmly established due to a weak church organization and poor communications. Medieval Bosnia thus remained a "no-man's land between faiths" rather than a meeting ground between the two Churches, leading to a unique religious history and the emergence of an "independent and somewhat heretical church". Catholicism and Eastern Orthodoxy predominated in different parts of what is today Bosnia and Herzegovina; the followers of the former formed a majority in the west, the north, and in the center of Bosnia, while those of the latter were a majority in most of Zachlumia (present-day Herzegovina) and along Bosnia's eastern border.

The bishopric of Bosnia (Latin: ecclesia Bosnensis) was mentioned in the 11th century, and was likely subordinated the Archdiocese of Split, until the 12th century when it was subordinated the Archdiocese of Ragusa. During the jurisdiction dispute between Ragusa and the Archdiocese of Antivari (elevated through Vukan Nemanjić), Ragusa stressed the rights over Zahumlje (also known as Hum) and "Serbia which is Bosna" (Latin: regnum Servillie, quod est Bosna). This identification of Bosna stems from the fact that it had been a province of Serbia; following 1018, with the establishment of the Archbishopric of Ohrid, the territory west of the bishoprics of Syrmia, Ras and Prizren stayed under the jurisdiction of the maritime church centers which disputed over land in the hinterland. The bishopric of Bosnia was among those which used Slavic in liturgy, and naturally used Eastern liturgical books with models characteristic of the Eastern rite. It remains unknown how much that bishopric was rooted and even its seat is unknown.

=== Heresy and initial Papal measures ===
Dualistic heretics started expanding in Bosnia at the end of the 12th century and became rooted in the 13th century. The first news of Dualistic heresy in Bosnia stems from the reign of Ban Kulin (r. 1180–1204). In 1199, Kulin was accused to have given refuge to heretics from the Dalmatian cities fleeing persecution. As the Serbian Grand Prince Stefan Nemanja (r. 1166–1196) persecuted the "Bogomils", it is possible that a heretical group had also arrived from there. Vukan Nemanjić of Zeta, a newly made Catholic and Hungarian ally, wished to elevate the Archdiocese of Antivari (over Ragusa) and wrote to Pope Innocent III that Kulin and his family and 10,000 people had become heretics, without giving any description. Following this, the Archdiocese of Split (that was supported by Hungary) joined in on the accusations. The Papal Curia, already dealing with Western heretics, asked Hungarian king Emeric to deal with Bosnia, as it was a Hungarian vassal. Kulin averted this through the Bilino Polje abjuration council with the Archdiocese of Ragusa in April 1203, where according to Fine (1987) faulty teachings seem to have been errors of practice, stemming from ignorance, rather than heretical doctrines. The Bosnian monks (Latin: Christiani nominis ... in territorio Bosne) at the council renounced schism and recognized the Roman supremacy and promised to follow the rituals and way of life. The next year, the Papal legate Casamari described his mission as "against Patarenes in Bosnia" (Latin: quondam patarinorum in Bosna), however, the study of the mission shows that rather than the conversion of rooted Dualistic heretics, these monks were simply Eastern monks that were not updated on the church reforms. The abjuration failed to change the situation in Bosnia, as the heretics were rooted and also kept arriving from neighbouring lands, which the bishopric in Bosnia was incapable of countering.

In the 1220s, heresy was present in Bosnia, Hum, Neretvanska krajina, Omiš, and somewhat also in Croatia. In a 1225 letter of Pope Honorius III, archbishop Ugrin Csák is encouraged to continue "eradicating heretics in Bosnia, Soli and Usora". In 1232, the bishop of Bosnia was accused of being uneducated, not even knowing the way of crossing, and his own brother was a leading heretic whom he protected, and lived together with heretics in the same village. Papal legate Jacobus Pecorari removed the Bosnian bishop in 1233, and the bishopric was then also removed from the hands of the Archdiocese of Ragusa due to inactivity against heresy and put directly under the Papal See. A "Latin", the Dominican friar Johannes Wildeshausen, was appointed the new bishop. The Papal mission against heresy was supported by the Hungarian king, prince, and Ban of Bosnia Matej Ninoslav. In 1234, Pope Gregory IX began the Bosnian Crusade to strengthen Catholicism in Bosnia, and that year Coloman of Galicia became the leader in the mission; while Coloman fought with the sword, bishop Wildeshausen fought with the book. Coloman was successful, and received the administration of Bosnia by August 1235, thereby becoming a feudal sovereign under his father Andrew II. Bishop John was exhausted and decided to leave, while Coloman likely led a war in 1236–1237, reportedly finished with "eradicating" heresy in a letter dated 26 April 1238. Ninoslav then accepted the new holdings of the Catholic church in Bosnia and gave away considerable rights to Hungary and the Catholic church, such as taxes and lands. In 1247, the Catholic bishop of Bosnia transferred to Slavonia and the seat became Đakovo, gifted by Coloman, and the diocese was subordinated the Hungarian Archdiocese of Kalocsa.

== History ==
The transfer of the diocese to Đakovo ended this attempt at destroying the "heretics" in Bosnia, that were supported by local power. The local Bosnian bishopric was traditionally Slavic in liturgy and had local clergy, which made it easy for heretics to influence. Rome did not systematically try to erase the local Bosnian church after this, as this was isolated heresy in a small and remote land. The anti-heretical measures depended on the relation between Hungary and the Pope, and if Bosnia was deemed obedient enough for the Hungarian kings. The "crusades" against heresy in Bosnia in the late 14th- and the 15th centuries were more of political nature than related to church affairs, and were headed by the Franciscans.

Reinerius Saccho called the heresy on the Eastern Adriatic as one "Slavonic church" (Latin: ecclesia Sclauonie). According to Croatian historian L. Špoljarić (2019), the Bosnian Church sprung from the Catholic bishopric of Bosnia that renounced Catholic allegiance in the first half of the 13th century, when the Hungarian-appointed bishop moved to Đakovo and the bishop was instead elected by the Bosnian ban and nobility, and the "Bosnian Church" gradually developed its own structure, functioning as a monastic order.

In 1280, heresy in Bosnia was still present, as per Hungarian king Ladislaus IV. It was not until Pope Nicholas' Bull Prae Cunctis in 1291 that the Franciscan-led Inquisition was imposed on Bosnia.

In 1459, facing increasing Ottoman pressure and seeking support from the Papacy, King Thomas of Bosnia shifted to persecute the Krstjani (called "Manicheans" in Papal documents) and forcibly converted 12,000 people. While forty of the church dignitaries were banished, three of the leading individuals of the Krstjani were deported to abjure in Rome, disproving "50 errors of Manichean heretics" in a public ceremony in front of the Pope on 14 May 1461. The Bosnian Church was thereby formally dismantled. In the spring of 1463, Bosnia fell after some weeks to the Ottoman Empire. The Bosnian Church had existed for two centuries.

== Organization and characteristics ==
The Bosnian Church used Slavic language in liturgy.

The church was headed by a bishop, called djed ("grandfather"), and had a council of twelve men called strojnici. The monks were known as krstjani or kršćani ('adherents of the Cross' or 'Christians'). Some of the adherents resided in small monasteries, known as hiže (sing. hiža, "house"), while others were wanderers, known as gosti (sing. gost, "guest"). It is difficult to ascertain how the theology differed from that of the Orthodox and Catholic. The practices were, however, unacceptable to both.

The church's organisation and beliefs are poorly understood, because few if any records were left by church members; the church is mostly known from anti-heretical Catholic writings.

The Church was mainly composed of monks in scattered monastic houses. It had no territorial organization and it did not deal with any secular matters other than attending people's burials, nor involve itself in state issues very much. Notable exceptions were when King Stephen Ostoja of Bosnia, a member of the Bosnian Church himself, had a djed as an advisor at the royal court between 1403 and 1405, and an occasional occurrence of a krstjan elder being a mediator or diplomat.

=== Origin ===
There are several conclusions made by scholars regarding the origin and formation of the Bosnian Church.

- According to Dragojlović (1987), the organization, teachings and rituals could only be understood in the frame of theological mysticism in the Eastern Church, which the believers adopted from domestic monks and not from dualistic heretics whose organization and teachings are unknown in krstjani sources. The organization, teachings and rituals of the Bosnian Church show that it sprung from the older unreformed hermitic monasticism that developed outside the Byzantine sphere, rather than being an affiliation of the Eastern Bogomilism or Western Catharism. The older hermitic monasticism in the other South Slavic lands were put under Orthodox Church control in the late 12th- and beginning of 13th century through erecting churches and introducing monastic rules, adapting into Cenobitic monasticism. The hierarchy, internal organization and teachings prove its origin in this type of monasticism. Catholic sources called the krstjani heretics "monks" (regulantes and monachos), while native sources used the terms redovi, redovnici, sveti ljudi, božiji ljudi, terms used in the Eastern Church for hermit monks. The hierarchy ranks of "elder" (starac, djed) and gost originated in Eastern monasticism. The krstjani held monasticism as the highest sacrament, edited from Eastern monasticism.
- According to Minczew (2020), the Bosnian Church received some influence from Balkan Bogomilism, seen in elements found in the Srećković Gospel. The krstjani did not build churches and called temples "inns", while the Bogomils held a negative view to temples, calling them "crossroads" and "belonging to the Devil". The scarce sacral archaeology and icon painting of medieval Bosnia points to the krstjani aversion to temples (and connection to Bogomilism), according to him. Both the krstjani and Bogomils rejected the Eucharist. The krstjani rejected the sacrament of confession to a priest, viewing it as a sin, while the Bogomils confessed to each other. The Srećković Gospel disparagingly calls St. John a "water-bearer", while the Bogomils viewed John as an associate of Satan for baptizing Jesus with water. Some similarities may however be typological.

=== Beliefs, teachings and rituals ===
The krstjani, based on their writings, believed in "one All-Mighty God", understood in the Trinity of father, son and holy spirit – "one Lord Jesus Christ", son of the "Holy Bogorodica" (Theotokos), the Creator "of all that exists", "without whom nothing existed that existed" and in "one holy and undividable Trinity". This is opposed to dualistic teachings.

The Bosnian Church counted the Old Testament patriarchs and prophets among "God's People", while the medieval dualistic sects viewed those as the "servants of the Devil". The krstjani adopted the mystical dualism from the Eastern Church regarding the Devil.

As the hermit monks, the krstjani prayed in the open. They buried their dead and put up gravestones, and prayed for them. Their books were illustrated with crosses, Jesus Christ, Virgin Mary, Old Testament prophets, apostles and saints.

=== Hierarchy ===
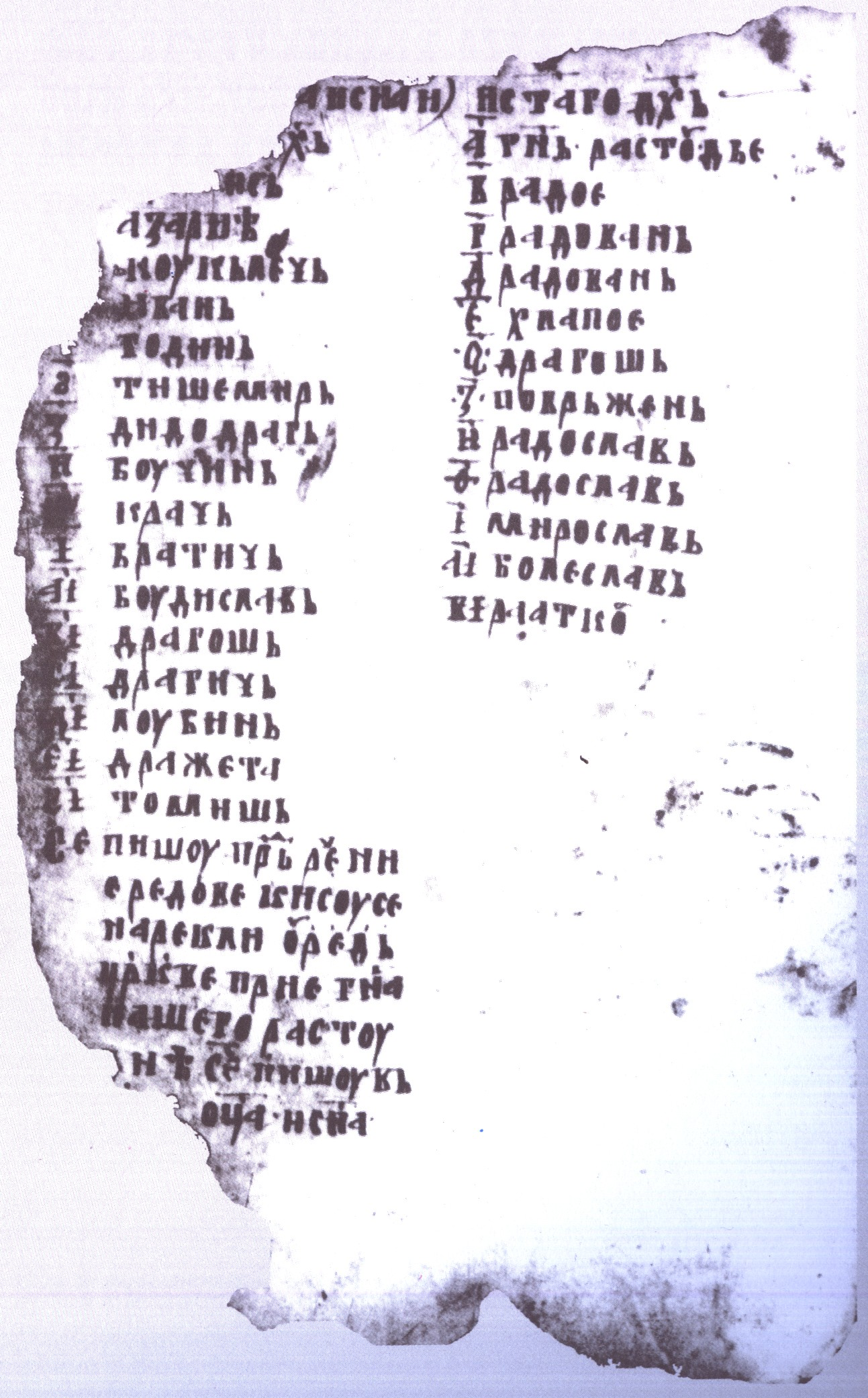
Batalo's Gospel with names of bishops.

The title djed (literally "grandfather") was used for the head of the Bosnian Church. Twelve names are listed in a single column in Batalo's Gospel, a manuscript made for nobleman Batalo in 1393 and often called Red gospodina Rastudija (transl. Order of Bishop Rastudije). They are listed in reverse order, with the name of the incumbent djed Rastudije first followed by his predecessors back to Ratko in the late 13th century. The list does not have dates for their reigns, but a few of them are known from other acts. If the list was complete at the time it was written down, then Ratko was either the first to use the title djed or represents a break in the history of the Bosnian church. The listed were Ratko (I), Boleslav, Miroslav, Radoslav (I), Radoslav (II), Povržen, Dragost, Hlapoje, Radovan (I), Radovan (II), Radoje, and Rastudije.

In the column to the left of the djed list are 16 names, including Jeremija, Azarija, Kukleč, Ivan, Godin, Tišemir, Didodrag, Bučina, Krač, Bratič, Budislav, Dragoš, Dragič, Ljubin, Dražeta, Tomiša. This has sometimes been taken for a list of Ratko's predecessors, but it does not line up with known data and how it should be read in relation to the other column is not clear. Three of the names—Dragič, Ljubin and Dražeta—are known from the abjuration of Bilino Polje in 1203, so the list is perhaps a list of revered Bosnian monks (not bishops).

== Manuscripts ==
- Hval's Codex, written in 1404 in Cyrillic, is one of the most famous manuscripts belonging to the Bosnian Church in which there are some iconographic elements which are not in concordance with the supposed theological doctrine of Christians (Annunciation, Crucifixion and Ascension).
- Batalo's Gospel, written in 1394 in Cyrillic, by Stanko Kromirijanin for Bosnian magnate Batalo. Includes a list of names believed to have been hierarchs.
- Radosav's Gospel, written in the mid-15th century in Glagolithic, by krstjanin Radosav for krstjanin Gojsav.
- Srećković Gospel, includes marginal glosses regarding krstjani teachings and beliefs.
- Čajniče Gospel, the only medieval Bosnian gospel that has been kept in the country to this day.
- Gospel of Divoš, written in the 14th century in Cyrillic, for nobleman Divoš Tihoradić of Usora.
- Gospel of St. Nicholas of Rošci, written in the 14th century in Cyrillic.
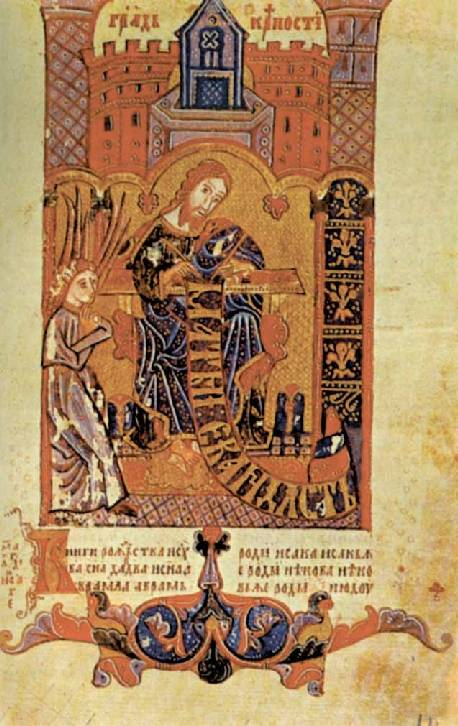
A folio from Hval's Codex.

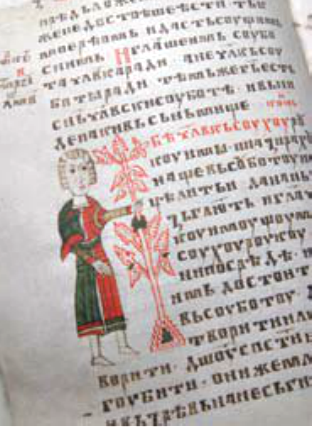
A folio from Gospel of Divoš.

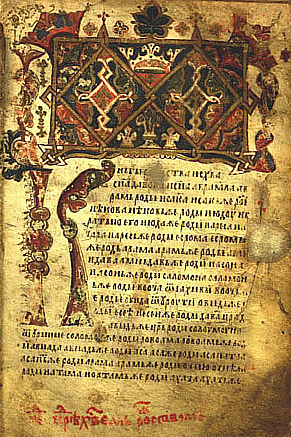
A folio from Gospel of St. Nicholas of Rošci.

== Studies ==
The first monograph on the medieval Bosnian Church was written by Božidar Petranović in 1867, titled Bogomili, crkva bosanska i krstjani, in which it was claimed that the independent Bosnian church sprung from the Eastern rite. Croatian historian Franjo Rački published the treatise Bogomili i Patareni in 1869, where he refuted Petranović's summary, but only used Papal documents. Croatian historians followed Rački's conclusion, that the Bosnian Church was essentially Gnostic and Manichaean in nature. This interpretation was supported and elaborated upon by a host of historians, most prominently Dominik Mandić, Sima Ćirković, Vladimir Ćorović, Miroslav Brandt, and Franjo Šanjek. However, a number of other historians (Leo Petrović, Jaroslav Šidak, Dragoljub Dragojlović, Dubravko Lovrenović, and Noel Malcolm) argued that the theology of Bosnian Christian writings was impeccably orthodox, and claimed the phenomenon can be sufficiently explained by the relative isolation of Bosnian Christians, which retained many archaic traits predating the East-West Schism in 1054.

Conversely, American historian of the Balkans, John Fine Jr., does not believe in the dualism of the Bosnian Church at all. Though he represents his theory as a "new interpretation of the Bosnian Church", his view is very close to the theories of J. Šidak and several other scholars before him. He believes that while there could have been heretical groups alongside the Bosnian Church, the group was inspired by Papal overreach. A difficulty in determining the theological orientation of the Bosnian Church is the fact that it was "politically forbidden, to write anything about the theological nature of the Bosnian Church during the mediaeval period."

The Bosnian Church has been described by some authors as a forerunner of Protestantism.

== Sources ==
- Fine, John Van Antwerp Jr. (1994) [1987]. The Late Medieval Balkans: A Critical Survey from the Late Twelfth Century to the Ottoman Conquest. Ann Arbor, Michigan: University of Michigan Press. ISBN 0-472-08260-4.
- Fine, John Van Antwerp Jr. (2007) [1975]. The Bosnian Church: Its Place in State and Society from the Thirteenth to the Fifteenth Century: a New Interpretation. London: Saqi Books. ISBN 978-0-86356-503-8.
- Stoianovich, Traian (2015). Balkan Worlds: The First and Last Europe. London: Routledge. ISBN 978-1-317-47615-3.
