= Vjekoslav Klaić =

Croatian historian and writer (1849–1928)

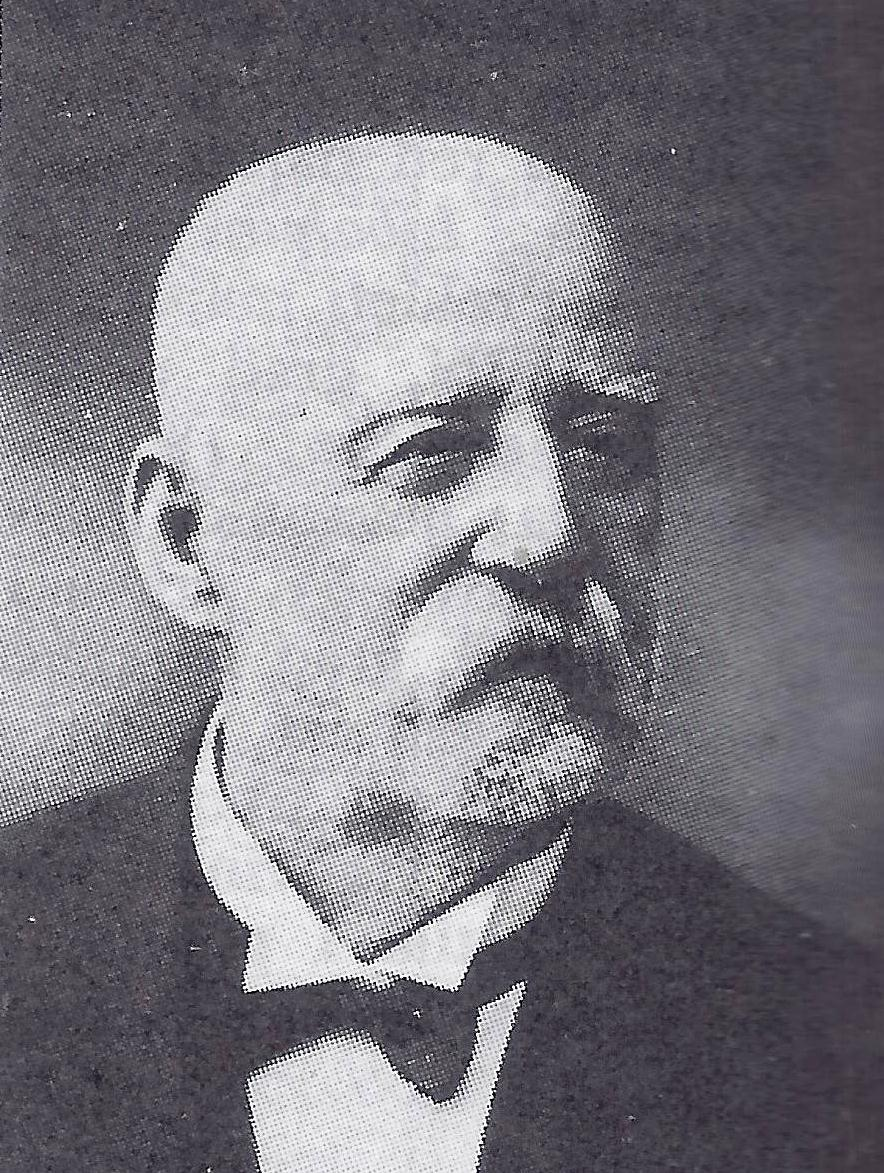
- Born: 21 June 1849; Garčin, Military Frontier, Austrian Empire
- Died: 1 July 1928 (aged 79); Zagreb, Kingdom of Serbs, Croats and Slovenes
- Occupation: Historian
- Relatives: Nada Klaić (granddaughter)
- Writing career
- Language: Croatian

Vjekoslav Klaić (21 June 1849 – 1 July 1928) was a Croatian historian and writer, most famous for his monumental work History of the Croats.

Klaić was born in Garčin near Slavonski Brod as the son of a teacher. He was raised in German spirit and language, since his mother was German. Klaić went to school in Varaždin and Zagreb. Literature and music were more to his liking in the seminary than history; some of his musical works were performed. He studied history and geography in Vienna. After completing his studies, he taught for more than fifty years, first as a high school teacher, and after 1893 as a professor of general history at the University of Zagreb, where he stayed with short breaks until 1922, when he retired. He died in Zagreb.

In 1896 he became a regular member of the Yugoslav Academy of Sciences and Arts, and was an honourable doctor of the University of Prague and an external member of the Czech Academy of Sciences.

Klaić wrote for the weekly Hrvatska lipa of the Croatian Party of Rights and was the editor of Vienac for several years (1882–1889), founded an orchestra and conducted it, promoting Croatian music. In 1892 he started and edited the musical magazine Gusle. He wrote short stories and political articles in the Croatian spirit.

Among his historical works, the special place belongs to the monumental history Povijest Hrvata (History of the Croats), published by Kugli in five books (1899–1911). Klaić did not finish it. In a text about this book, another famous Croatian historian, Ferdo Šišić, pointed out (1914): "Materials, scientific method and details of Klaić's work surpass all the existing works of this kind in our historiography", while Jaroslav Šidak said that "Klaić's book, despite all of its shortcomings, has still not been surpassed regarding the wealth of information in its presentation of the 15th and 16th centuries".

His granddaughter Nada Klaić was also a prominent historian.

== Selected works ==
- Prirodni zemljopis Hrvatske (Natural Geography of Croatia, 1878)
- Topografske sitnice I and II (Topographic Minutiae, 1880)
- Poviest Bosne do propasti kraljevstva (History of Bosnia, 1882)
- Pripoviesti iz hrvatske poviesti (Tales from Croatian History, 1886–1891)
- Bribirski knezovi od plemena Šubić do god. 1347. (Dukes of Bribir, 1897)
- Povijest Hrvata od najstarijih vremena do svršetka XIX. stoljeća (History of the Croats, 1899–1922)
- Krčki knezovi Frankapani (The Frankopan Dukes of Krk, 1901)
- Život i djela Pavla Rittera Vitezovića (The Life and Work of Pavao Ritter Vitezović, 1914)

Academic offices
Preceded by Franjo Vrbanić	Rector of the University of Zagreb; 1902–1903	Succeeded by Ivan Bujanović
