= Rastudije =

13th century Bosnian bishop

Rastudije (Serbian Cyrillic: Растудије; died c. 1230), also Aristodius, was a bishop of the Bosnian Church, or a djed, as the bishops as a leader of the Bosnian Christians has been originally titled. He was declared a heretic by both the Orthodox and Catholic churches.

He lived at the end of the 12th and the beginning of the 13th century. It is known from Batalo's list that he was the founder of the "Red Gospodina Rastudija" transl. "Order of Lord Rastudije" in Bosnia, in which 12 monks, called krstjani, enrolled as early as 1203, of whom Dragić Ljubiša and Dražeta participated in the declaration of renouncing the schism at Bilino Polje. Rastudije and his supporters were condemned as heretics at the first synod in Žiča in 1221 by the Serbian Orthodox Church, which cursed them:

"And announce to everyone: Rastudije Bosanski and Radomir and Dražilo and Tolko and Tvrdoš and all who call themselves Christians and do not worship the holy icons and the honorable cross, to be cursed."
— Synod of the Serbian Orthodox Church

Many researchers identify Rastudije with Aristodius, who, condemned by the Catholic Church and banished from Dalmatia, finds refuge with Ban Kulin in Bosnia. According to Catholic sources, there were many "heretics" in Zadar in the 12th century. There were, among others, two Dalmatian patarenes, brothers Aristodije and Matej, sons of the Greek Zerubbabel, who moved to Zadar from Apulia in the second half of the 12th century. They were citizens of Zadar from their youth, and it is known that they were "skilled in Latin and Slavic books". Aristodije and Matej later moved to Split, where they are mentioned as the leaders of the Pataren movement, which drew many citizens. However, Archbishop Bernard of Split soon arrives in the city and begins the persecution of heretics. The Patarens of Split were expelled from the city, and all their property was confiscated. Exiled Dalmatian Christians find refuge in Bosnia, where Ban Kulin welcomes them warmly.

"We learned that the noble husband Bosnian Ban Kulin, when recently our brother the archbishop of Split expelled a considerable number of heretics from Split and Trogir, gave them not only a safe hiding place but also obvious protection, and gave his country and himself to their insolence and showed them attention as Catholics, even more than Catholics calling them Christians"
— Pope Innocent III in a letter to the Hungarian king Emeric 11 October 1200.

During the time of djed Rastudije, there was talk in the West about the existence of an antipope in the Balkans. In the letter of Cardinal Konrad, the papal legate for France, in which he summoned the French bishops to a synod in 1223, the head of the Bosnian Church is considered the antipope of Western European heretics, to whom the Albigensians go for advice and adopt his views. It is also said that he appointed his emissary Bartholomew of Carcassonne as bishop of Agen. English historian Roger de Wendover in 1236 also talks about the heretical pope in Bosnia.

It is assumed that Aristodije, i.e. Rastudije, after moving to Bosnia, became a respected leader of Bosnian Christians, known as Djed Rastudije, who remained in the service of Ban Kulin until his death, which is approximately dated around 1230 AD.

== See also ==
- Bosnian Church
- Bilinopoljska statement
- List of djed of the Bosnian Church
