= Gospel of Divoš =

14–15th century Bosnian Cyrillic manuscript

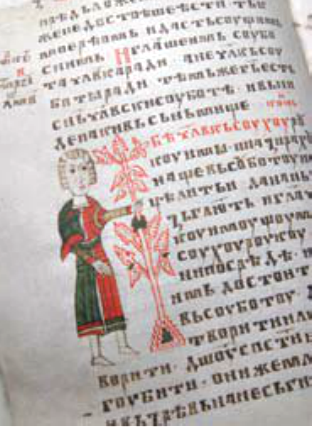
Decorated leaf with initials from 14th c. Bosnian Church book, Divoš Gospel.

The Gospel of Divoš Tihoradić or Divoš's Gospel, is a manuscript belonging to a member of the Bosnian Church. The Gospel is named after its commissioner, Bosnian nobleman and the lord of the Usora, Divoš Tihoradić, who lived in the first half of the 14th century. The gospel is one of the most important illuminated manuscripts of medieval Bosnia.

It was found in September 1960 in the Serbian Orthodox monastery in the Church of St. Nicholas in Podvrh near Bijelo Polje in Montenegro. The copyist and illuminator of the Divoš Gospel is unknown. It is assumed that it was made by Manuel (Emanuel) the Greek, a copyist and illuminator.

The manuscript of Divoš's Gospel is composed on sturdy parchment, measuring 16.5x22.5 cm. It has no cover, and the beginning and end are missing. The text is written in dark maroon ink, and the beginnings of the chapters in red ink. The name of the commissioner, Divoš Tihoradić, is recorded on folio 5 verso, 42 verso 132 and 182, so its production is associated with the first half of the 14th century.

In addition to the commissioner, the Bosnian origin of the manuscript is determined by the decoration, letter form and language. It is similar to other Bosnian parchment gospels (Manojlov, Mostar, Čajnički, Vrutočki, Kopitar, the Bosnian Gospel of the National Library in Belgrade and fragments of the Giljferding Bosnian Gospel. The Divoš Gospel stands out for the beauty of its painted decoration. It contains over 60 initials (mostly a man, an animal, a ribbon and a plant) and one flag. According to some authors, it is the main monument of Bosnian miniature painting.

A critical edition was published by the Institut za jezik of the University of Sarajevo in 2018.

== Bibliography ==
- Jelica Đurić – Rajka Ivanišević, Jevanđelje Divoša Tihoradića, Zbornik radova Vizantološkog instituta 7, Beograd 1961, 153–160.
- Irena Grickat, Divoševo Jevanđelje, Južnoslavenski filolog 25, Beograd 1961–1962, 227–293.
- Jurić-Kappel, Jagoda (2022) [2021-12-31]. "Kritičko izdanje Divoševa četveroevanđelja. Divoševo evanđelje. Studija i kritičko izdanje teksta. Priredila Lejla NAKAŠ. Univerzitet u Sarajevu, Institut za jezik. Edicija Posebna izdanja, knj. XXXI. Sarajevo 2018., 499 str". Slovo: časopis Staroslavenskoga instituta u Zagrebu (in Serbo-Croatian) (72): 392–407.
- Mazrak, Ema (2019). "Prilog proučavanju iluminacije evanđelja Divoša Tihoradića" [A Contribution to the Study of the Illuminations of Divoš Tihoradić's Gospel]. Иницијал: Часопис за средњовековне студије (in Serbo-Croatian) (7): 83–100. ISSN 2334-8003.
- Nakaš, Lejla, ed. (2018). Divoševo evanđelje: studija i kritičko izdanje teksta (PDF). Posebna izdanja (in Serbo-Croatian). Vol. 31. Sarajevo: Institut za jezik. ISBN 978-9958-620-27-0.
