= Declaration on the Name and Status of the Croatian Literary Language =

1967 declaration on languages in Yugoslavia

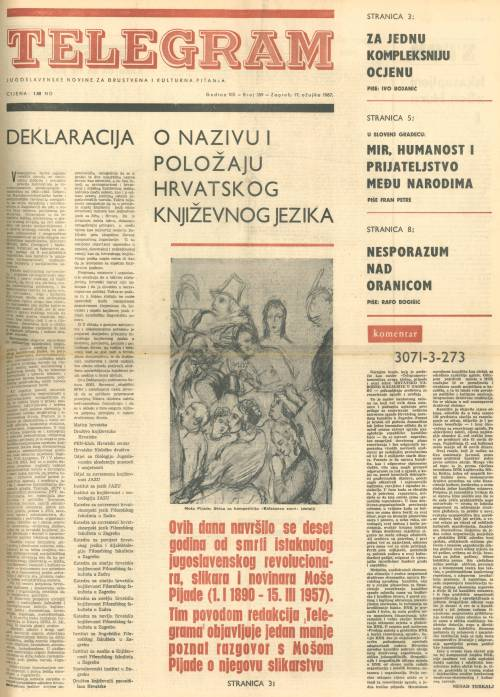
- The Declaration as published in the March 17, 1967 issue of Telegram
- Original title: Deklaracija o nazivu i položaju hrvatskog književnog jezika
- Created: March 17, 1967
- Location: Zagreb, SR Croatia, SFR Yugoslavia
- Author(s): elements of the Croatian intelligentsia and the secret police

The Declaration on the Name and Status of the Croatian Literary Language (Croatian: Deklaracija o nazivu i položaju hrvatskog književnog jezika) is the statement adopted by Croatian scholars in 1967 arguing for the equal treatment of the Serbian, Croatian, Slovene, and Macedonian language standards in Yugoslavia. Its demands were granted by the 1974 Yugoslav Constitution.

== Content ==
The declaration was published on March 13, 1967 in the Telegram, Yugoslav newspapers for social and cultural issues, nr. 359, March 17, 1967.

The Declaration affirms that Serbian and Croatian are linguistically the same, but demands separate language standards, each with their own "national" language name.

This document addressed the Sabor of SR Croatia and the Assembly of SFR Yugoslavia, stating:

[...] in the state administrative system, in the means of public and mass-communications ([...]), as well as in the language of the Yugoslav People's Army, federal governing bodies, legislature, diplomacy and political organizations, effectively even today a "state language" is being imposed, so that the Croatian language standard is being pushed out and brought into unequal position of a regional dialect. [Serbo-Croatian].

The signers of the declaration demanded the equality of the four Yugoslav language standards and the use of the Croatian literary language in schools and media. State authorities were accused of imposing an official state language.

== Legacy ==
The demands were rejected, and the Croatian Spring (MASPOK) movement was stopped. However, the Declaration was taken into consideration in the new Yugoslav constitution of 1974. Nearly all requests were granted in the formulation, and it remained in effect until the breakup of Yugoslavia.

The Declaration prompted Pavle Ivić to respond with his 1971 monograph Srpski narod i njegov jezik ("The Serbian People and Their Language").

In 2012, Josip Manolić publicly claimed that that long-standing State Security agent 'Forum' contributed to the writing of the Declaration, which journalists attributed to Dalibor Brozović. The same year, a 1997 manuscript by a Zadar university professor Ante Franić was published that had implicated Brozović, at the time one of his colleagues, in a similar manner.

On the publication's 45th anniversary in 2012, the Croatian weekly journal Forum republished the Declaration, accompanied by a critical analysis. On the occasion of the 50th anniversary, a new Declaration on the Common Language of the Croats, Montenegrins, Serbs and Bosniaks was written in 2017 in Zagreb.

== Signatories ==
- Matica hrvatska
- Croatian Writers' Association
- Croatian PEN
- Various departments of JAZU and the Faculty of Philosophy in Zagreb and in Zadar
- Old Church Slavonic Institute
- The association of the literary translators of Croatia (Društvo književnih prevodilaca Hrvatske)

== See also ==
- Croatian Spring
- SR Croatia
- Croatian language
- Croato-Serbian language
- Days of the Croatian Language
- Comparison of Serbo-Croatian standard varieties
- Declaration on the Common Language 2017
