= Varošluk =

- Village
- Location within Bosnia and Herzegovina
- Coordinates: 44.2414558°N 17.5408814°E
- Country: Bosnia and Herzegovina
- Entity: Federation of Bosnia and Herzegovina
- Canton: Central Bosnia
- Municipality: Travnik

Area
  - Total: 3.89 sq mi (10.07 km^{2})

Population (2013)
  - Total: 693
  - Density: 178/sq mi (68.8/km^{2})
- Time zone: UTC+1 (CET)
  - Summer (DST): UTC+2 (CEST)

Varošluk is a village in the municipality of Travnik, Bosnia and Herzegovina.

== Demographics ==
According to the 2013 census, its population was 693.

Ethnicity in 2013
Ethnicity	Number	Percentage
Bosniaks	616	88.9%
Croats	12	1.7%
Serbs	1	0.1%
other/undeclared	64	9.2%
Total	693	100%
