= Jajce Citadel =

Fortress in Jajce, Bosnia and Herzegovina

- Old Town of Jajce
- Part of Walled city of Jajce
- Jajce, Central Bosnia Canton; Bosnia and Herzegovina
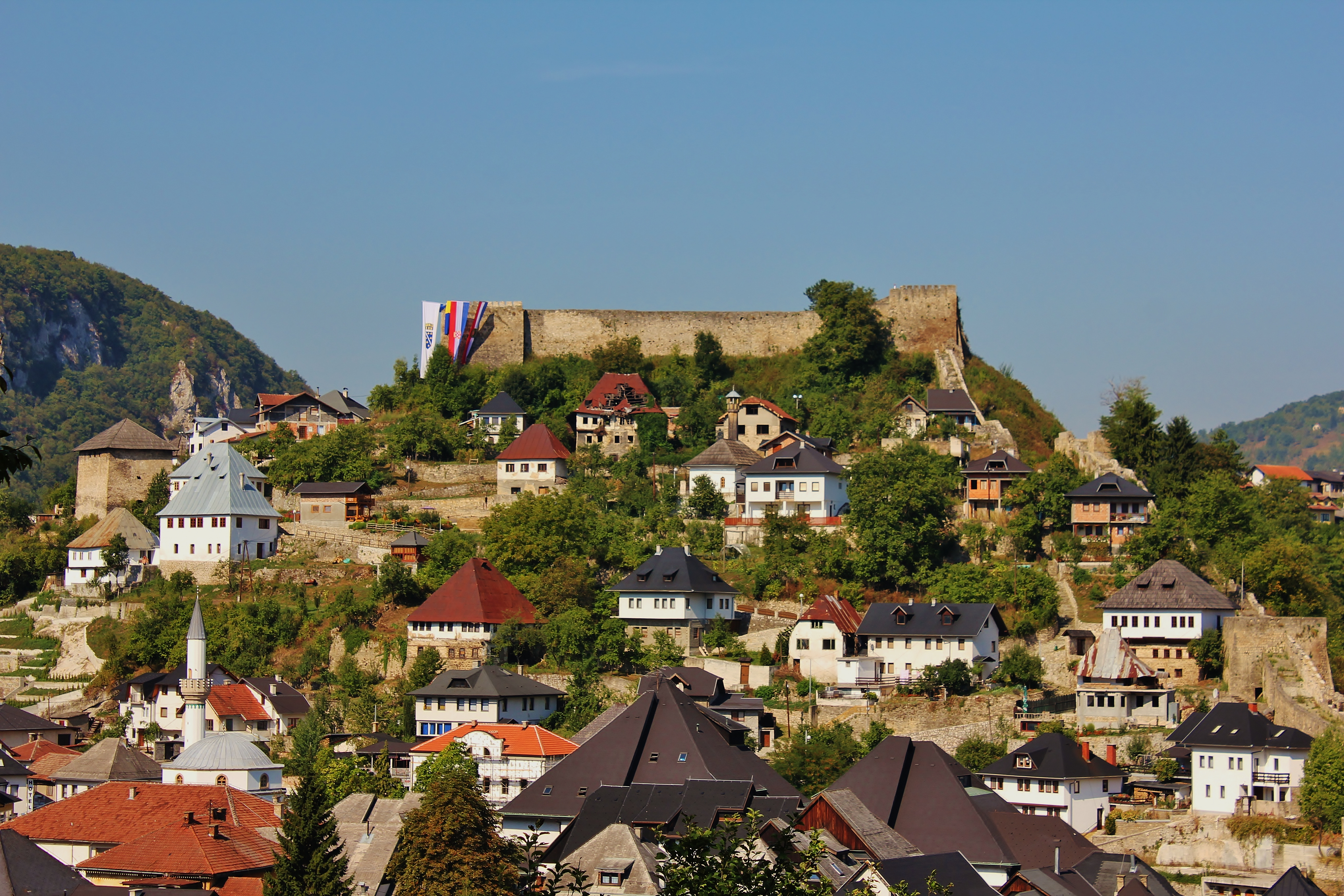
- Citadel overlooking an old Walled city of Jajce

Site information
- Type: Castle (residential, fortification)
- Owner: Hrvatinić, Kotromanić
- Controlled by: Hrvoje Vukčić May 1404 to at least 1 November 1423; Stjepan Tomašević; Banate of Bosnia, Kingdom of Bosnia, Ottoman Empire
- Open to the public: yes
- Condition: Repaired

Location
- Location within Bosnia and Herzegovina
- Coordinates: 44°20′22″N 17°16′13″E

Site history
- Built: 14th c.
- Built by: multilayered (probably old fort)
- Materials: Limestone (partly ashlar)
- Battles/wars: Ottoman siege

Garrison information
- Designations

KONS of Bosnia and Herzegovina
- Official name: Fortress in Jajce, the architectural ensemble
- Type: Category 0 monument
- Criteria: A, B, C iii.iv.v., D ii.v., E ii.v., F i.ii.iii., G v., H i., I i.ii.iii.
- Designated: 27 Jan 2003 (?th session)
- Part of: Walled city of Jajce / Jajce, the historic site (2494)
- Reference no.: 276
- Decision no.: 06-6-504/03-1
- Operator: Agency for Cultural, Historical and Natural Heritage and Development of Tourist Potential of Town Jajce

Jajce Citadel, or Jajce Fortress, is a major medieval fortress in Jajce, Bosnia and Herzegovina. It is the focal point as part of the Walled city of Jajce, and as such protected as National Monument of Bosnia and Herzegovina by the KONS BiH.

== Geography and location ==
Citadel overlooking an old Walled city of Jajce. The Walled city is located at the confluence of the Pliva and Vrbas rivers. It was founded and started developing in the Middle Ages and acquired its final form during the Ottoman period. It is the first to be built, on the top of the hill called Hum at 470 m.a.s.l., at the end of the 13th and beginning of the 14th century as the fortress for Bosnian Grand Duke, Hrvoje Vukčić. It was surrounded by a small settlement on the eastern slopes, as it is today. It was repaired, rebuilt and enlarged many times since.

Today, the citadel consists of a main portal, decorated with the coat of arms of the royal Kotromanić dynasty, two large bastions, and inside a gunpowder tower. The walls are traversable with a path along the entire length, connecting Great Southern Bastion with the Great Northern Bastion, constructed on the diagonally opposite corners.

== Ramparts, city gates and watch-towers ==
The ramparts and city gates were added, until it encompassed the entire settlement underneath with its large ramparts. The fortress became a citadel and the focal point of the system of fortifications, whose ramparts combined length stretch in a perimeter of about 1,300 metres (4,300 ft) and covers an area of roughly 11,200 square metres (121,000 sq ft).

The walled perimeter encloses Jajce from two sides, with the two main city gates, one at each side, the northern main city-gate the "Banja Luka gatehouse", and the southern main city-gate the "Travnik gatehouse".

The northern perimeter rampart walls stretch from the north-east corner of the fortress, near the Clock Tower, to "Mračna kapija" gate, followed by "Velika tabija" gatehouse and bastion, and from Velika tabija to the "Džikovac tower", from there to "Papaz tower", reaching the northern main city-gate the "Banja Luka gatehouse", and from here wall follows direction toward the river Vrbas, ending at the "Šamić tabije". The western perimeter rampart starts at the western corner of the citadel, near its main portal, and follows southeastern downward direction to "Medvjed tower", than, the wall goes further south of to the Pliva river, than turns to the east toward the southern main city-gate the "Travnik gatehouse", wher it ends.

== Protected heritage ==
It was founded and started developing in the Middle Ages and acquired its final form during the Ottoman period. There are several churches and mosques built in different times during different rules, making Jajce a rather diverse town in this aspect. It is declared National Monument of Bosnia and Herzegovina, and, as the old Jajce city core, including the waterfall, and other individual sites outside the walled city perimeter, such as the Jajce Mithraeum. Designated as The natural and architectural ensemble of Jajce it is proposed as such for inscription into the UNESCO's World Heritage Site list. The bid for inscription is currently placed on the UNESCO Tentative list.

== See also ==
- Blagaj Fortress
