= Jajce-1 Hydroelectric Power Station =

Jajce-1
- Location within Bosnia and Herzegovina
- Interactive map of Jajce-1
- Official name: Jajce-1 Hydroelectric Power Station
- Country: Bosnia and Herzegovina
- Location: Jajce
- Coordinates: 44.345281°N 17.228568°E
- Purpose: Electricity generation
- Status: Operational
- Construction began: 1948
- Opening date: 1957
- Construction cost: 5,9 billion dinars
- Owner: Government of the FBiH
- Operator: JP "Elektroprivreda HZHB"

Dam and spillways
- Type of dam: Weir
- Impounds: Pliva River
- Spillways: 1
- Spillway type: weir

Reservoir
- Creates: Great Pliva Lake
- Total capacity: 24 hm3
- Active capacity: 4,2 hm3
- Normal elevation: 427,1 m n.m (max.)

Jajce-1 HPP
- Coordinates: 44.377102°N 17.282109°E
- Operator: JP "Elektroprivreda HZHB"
- Commission date: 1957
- Type: diversion
- Hydraulic head: 98,4 m (bruto average), 92,5 m (average net fall)
- Turbines: Francis
- Installed capacity: 60 MW
- Capacity factor: 0,8
- Overall efficiency: 89 %
- Annual generation: 220 GW

Jajce I Hydroelectric Power Station is a diversion type of hydroelectric power plant, taking its waters from Great Pliva Lake (Serbo-Croatian: Veliko Plivsko jezero), whose powerhouse (generation hall, generating station or generating plant) is situated underground near Podmilačje, in Bosnia and Herzegovina. It use two 30 MW generators, total installed capacity of 60 MW.

== See also ==
- List of power stations in Bosnia-Herzegovina
- Pliva
- Jajce-2 Hydroelectric Power Station
