= Walled city of Jajce =

Fortified Old town of Jajce

- Fortified Old town
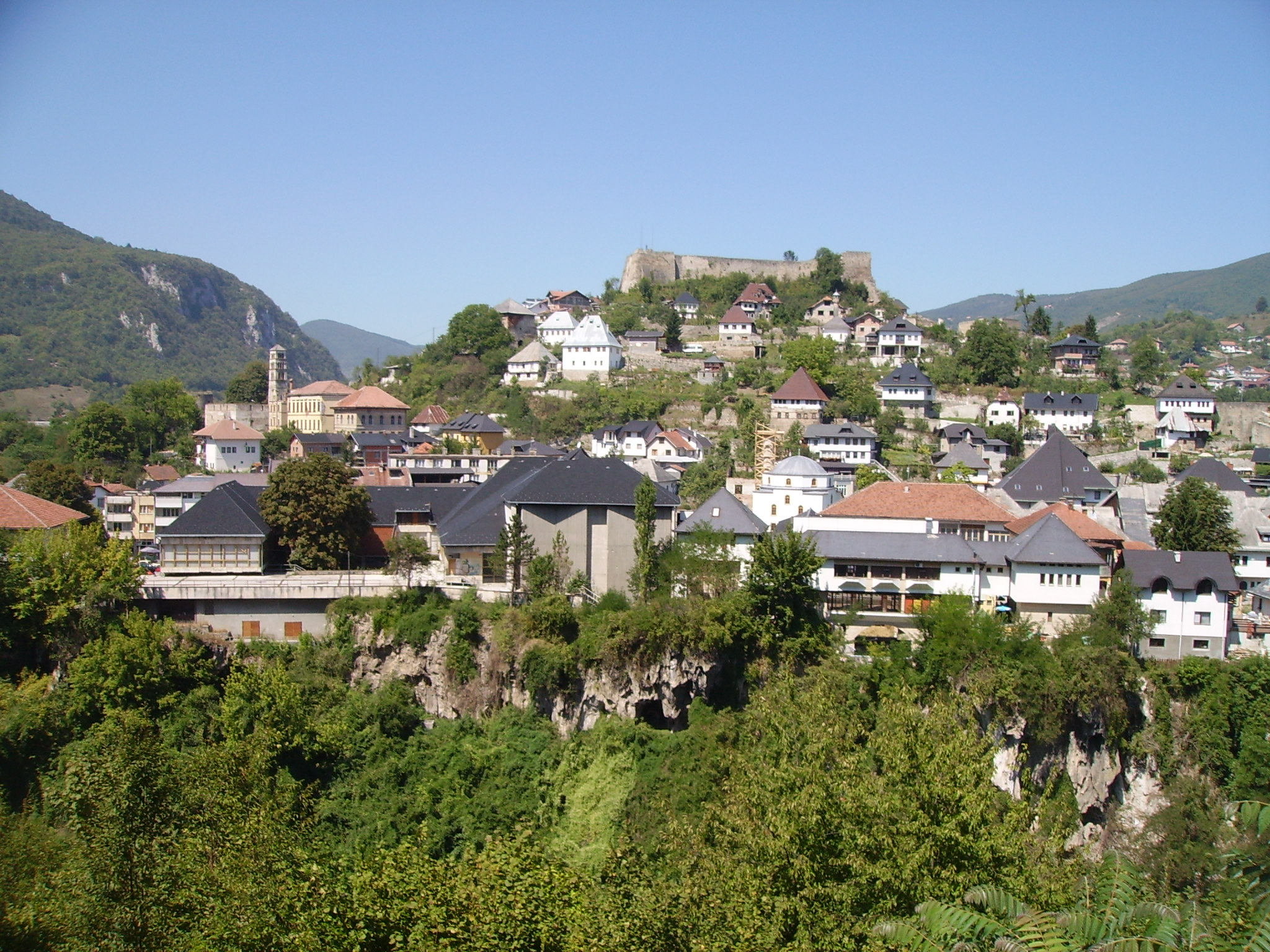
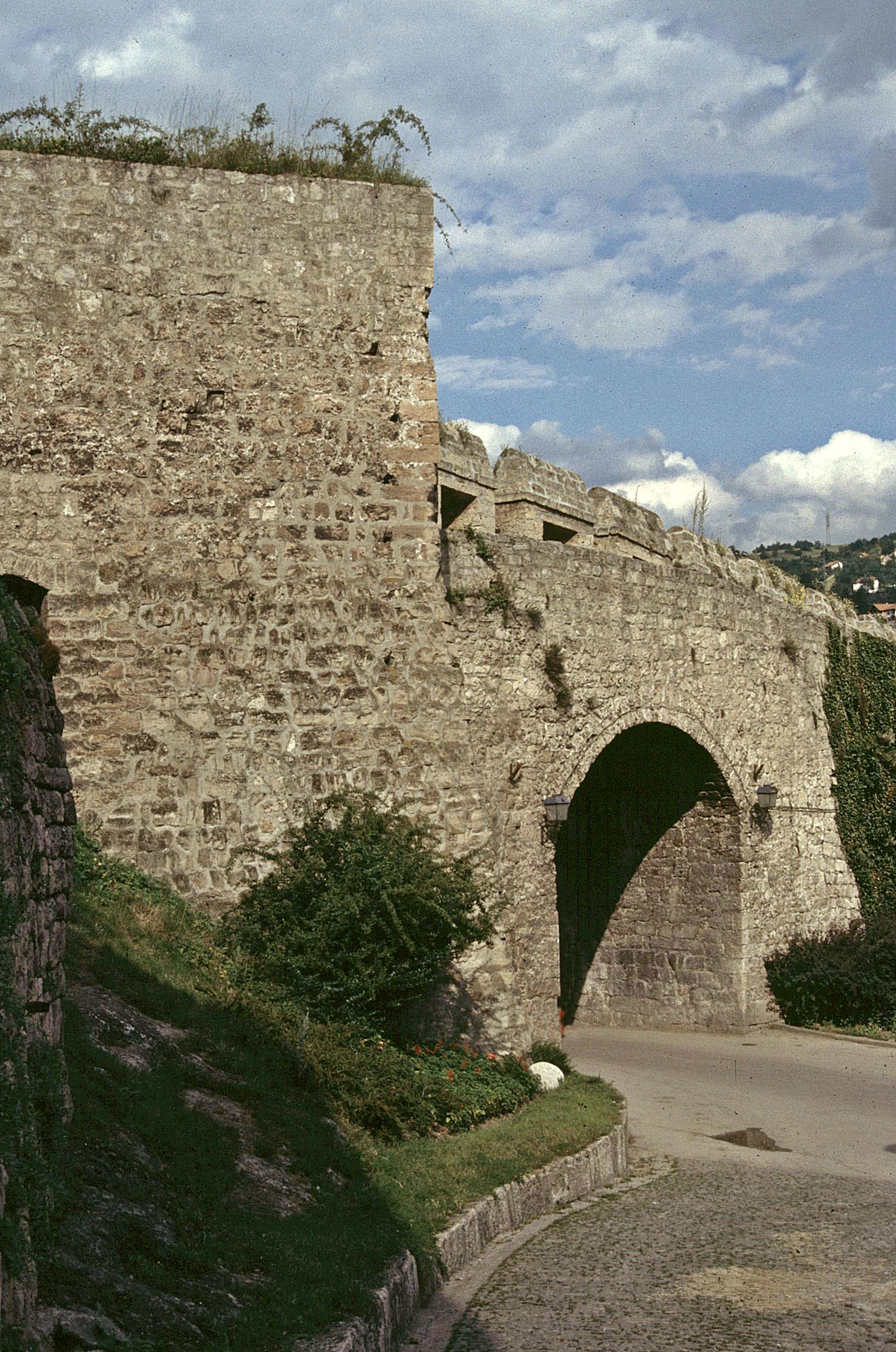
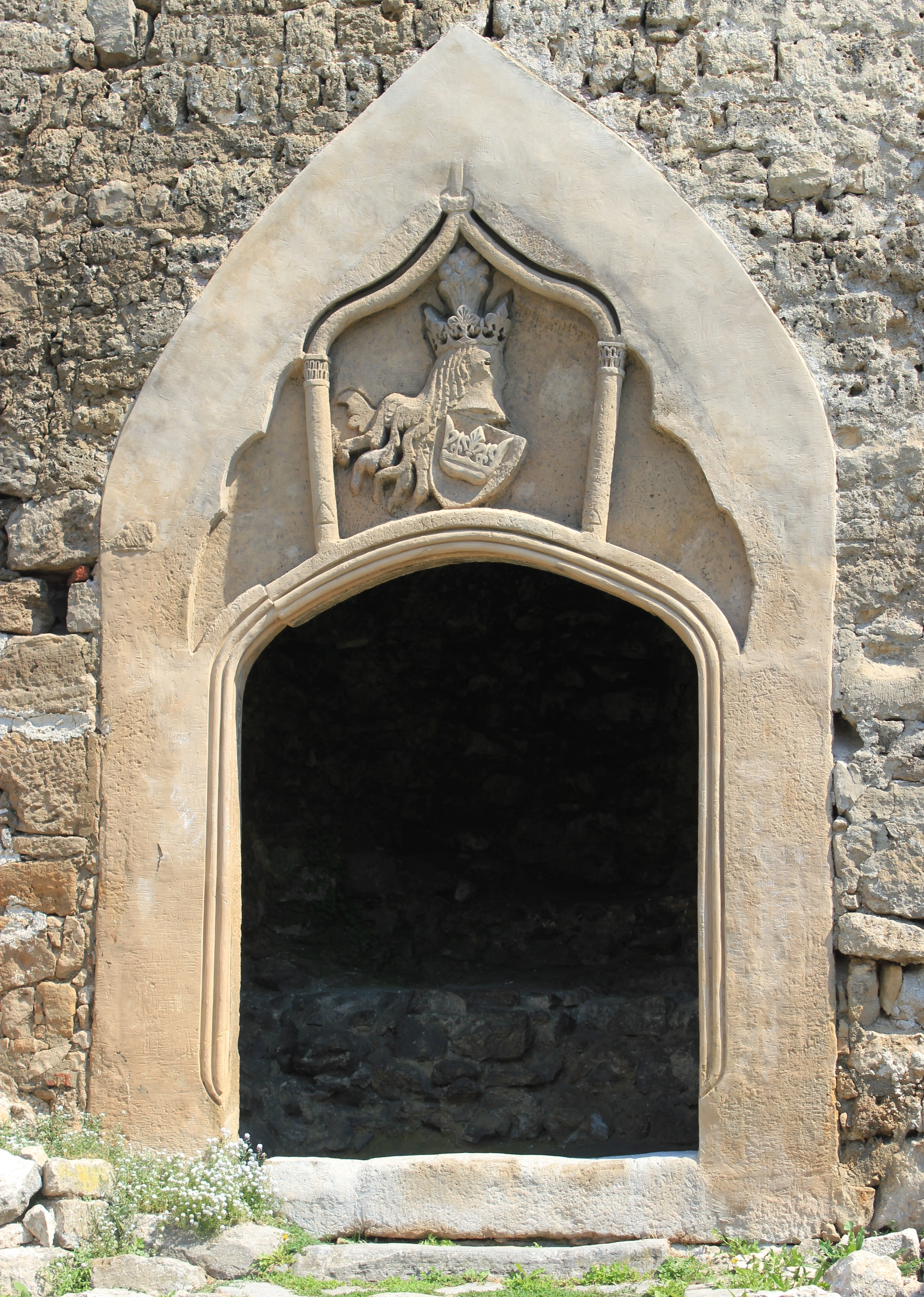
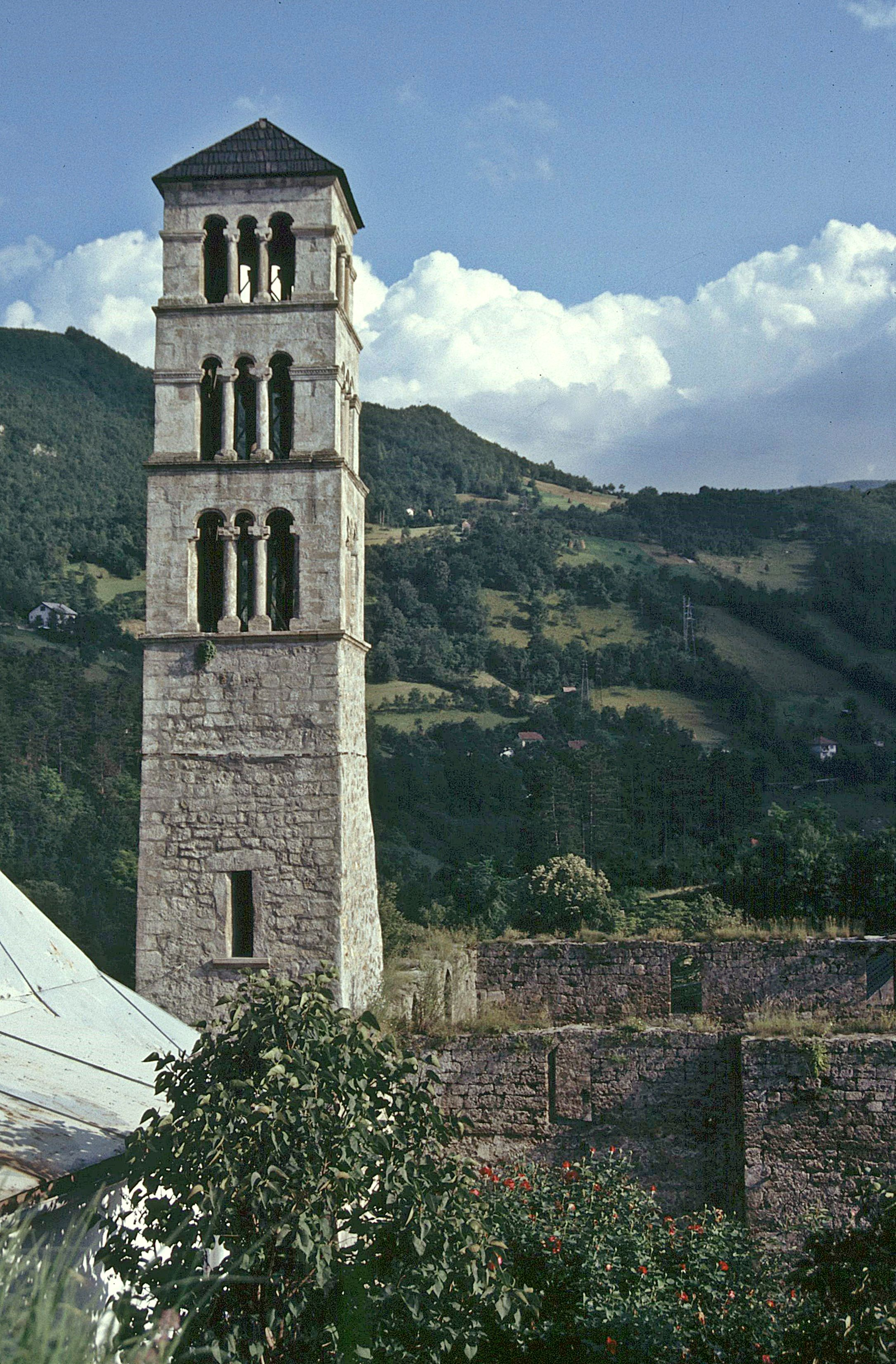
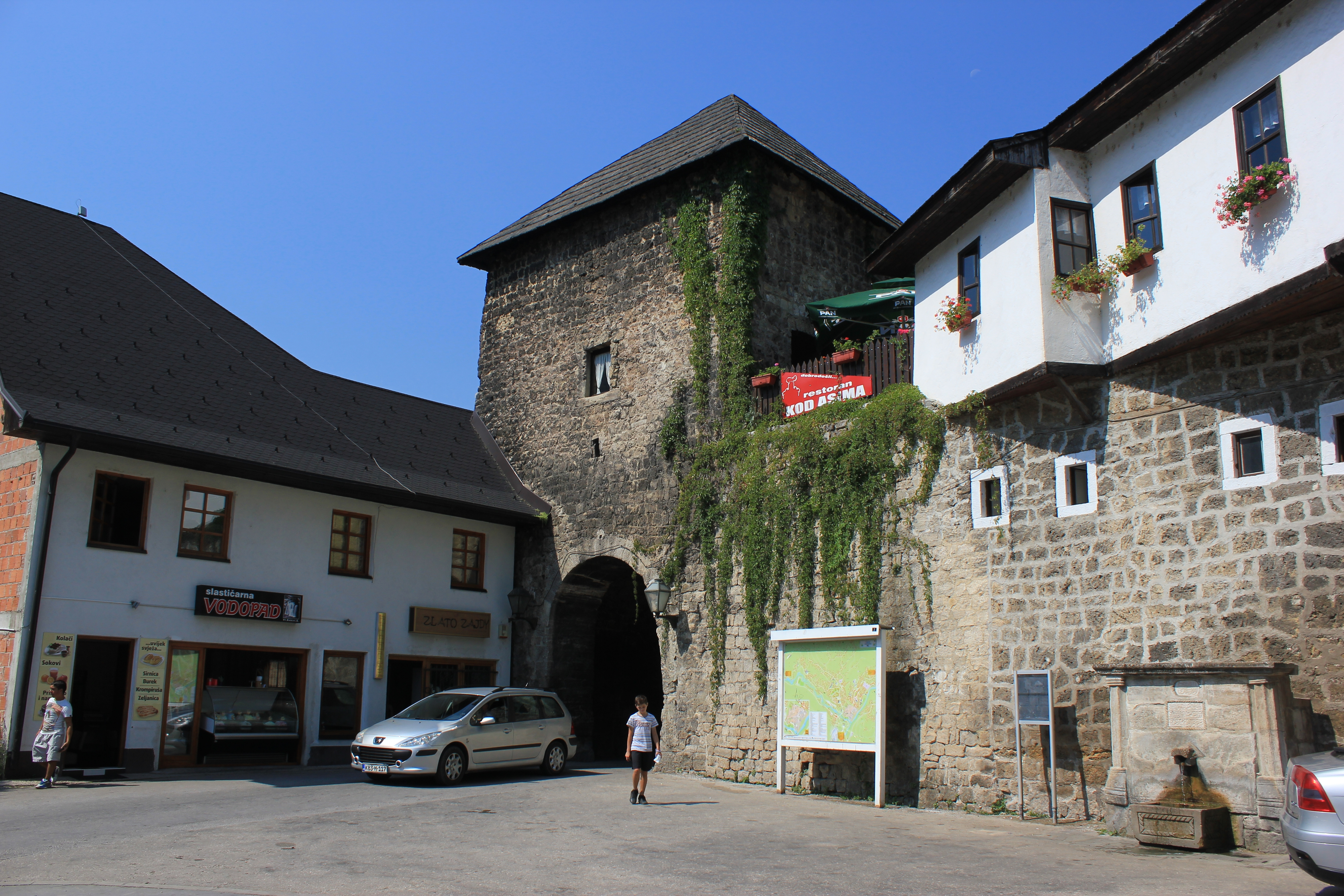
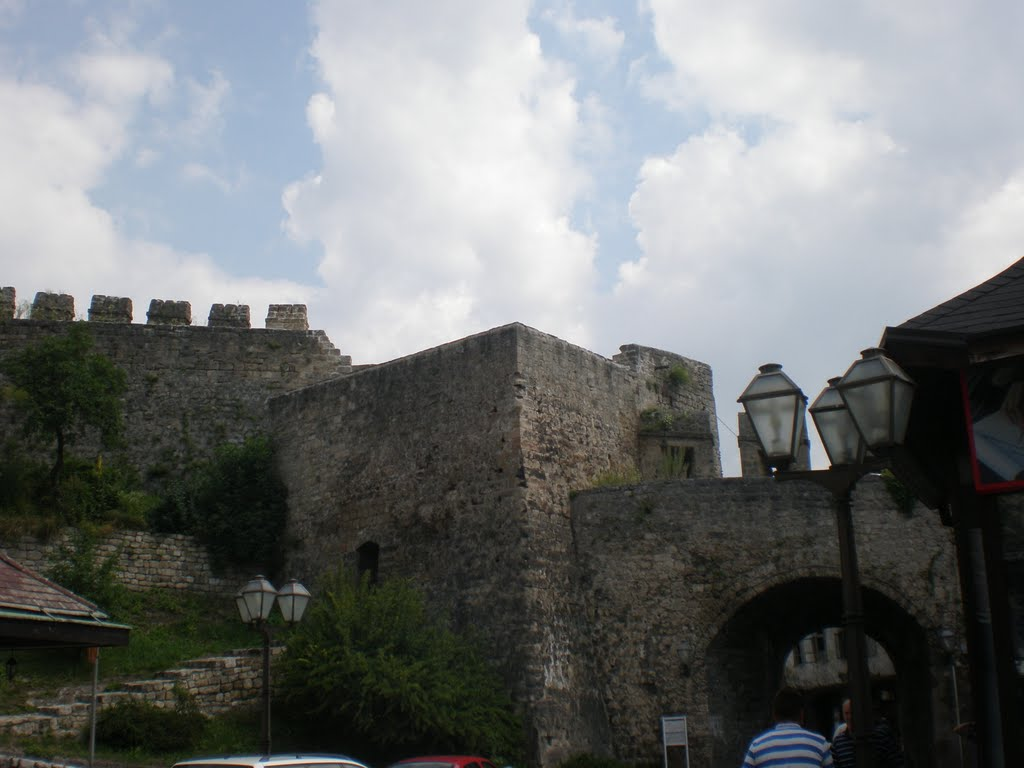
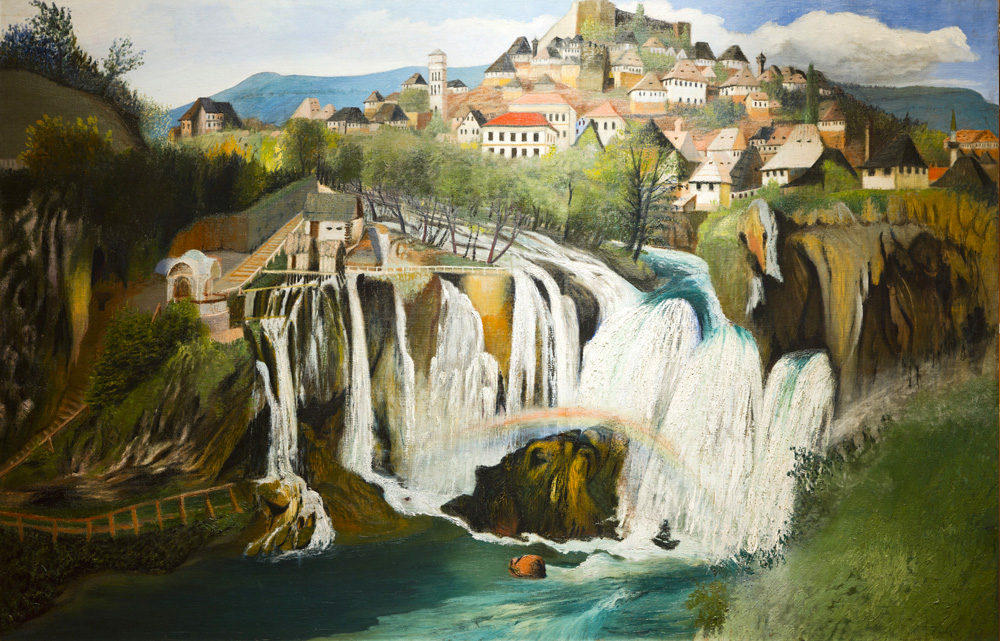
- Fortified Old town of Jajce
- Interactive map of Walled city of Jajce
- Location within Bosnia and Herzegovina
- Coordinates: 44°20′22″N 17°16′13″E
- Country: Bosnia and Herzegovina
- Town: Jajce
- Established: 14th century
- Founded by: Hrvoje Vukčić Hrvatinić
- Time zone: UTC+1 (CET)
  - Summer (DST): UTC+2 (CEST)
- Events: In 1461 coronation of the last Bosnian king, Stephen Tomašević of Bosnia; In 1463 and 1527 captured by the Ottomans; In 1471 captured by Matthias Corvinus
- Historical leaders: Matthias Corvinus, Petar Berislavić, Tvrtko II of Bosnia, Stephen Thomas of Bosnia, Stephen Tomašević of Bosnia, Hrvoje Vukčić Hrvatinić

KONS of Bosnia and Herzegovina
- Official name: The historic urban area of Jajce
- Type: Category 0 monument
- Criteria: A, B, D i.ii.iii.iv.v., E iii.v., F, G v., H, I i.ii.iii.
- Designated: 7 July 2004 (?th session)
- Part of: Jajce, the historic site (2494)
- Reference no.: 2494
- Decision no.: 08.2-6-1042/03
- Operator: Agency for Cultural, Historical and Natural Heritage and Development of Tourist Potential of Town Jajce

The Walled City of Jajce (Bosnian, Croatian and Serbian: Jajačka tvrđava, Serbian Cyrillic: Јајачка тврђава) is a medieval fortified nucleus of Jajce in Bosnia and Herzegovina, with Jajce Citadel high above town on top of pyramidal-shaped steep hill, enclosed with approximately 1,300 metres (4,300 ft) long defensive walls,. It is one of the best preserved fortified capitals of the Bosnian Kingdom, the last stronghold before the kingdom dissolved under the pressure of military advancement at the onset of Ottoman Empire takeover.

The old Jajce city core with the Citadel and other individual sites inside, but also outside the walled city perimeter, such as the King's Grave, or the Jajce Mithraeum, Church of St John in Podmilačje, Vinac Fortress, orthodox Church of the Most Holy Mother of God, Franciscan monastery of Saint Luke, Roman Catholic cemetery Hrast, including the Pliva waterfall, is declared National Monument of Bosnia and Herzegovina by KONS, as the natural and architectural ensemble of Jajce and proposed as such for inscription into the UNESCO's World Heritage Site list.

== Geography ==
The entire complex of the Walled city of Jajce, with the citadel, city ramparts, watchtower Medvjed-kula, and two main city gate-towers lies on the southern slope of a large rocky pyramid at the confluence of the rivers Pliva and Vrbas, enclosed by these rivers from the south-southwest, with the bed of the Pliva, and east-southeast by the river Vrbas gorge.

The altitude at the fortress is 470 meters a.s.l, at Pliva Lakes 426.6 meters, and at the waterfall 362.5 meters a.s.l. The fortress which later became a citadel and the focal point of the system of fortifications, and the ramparts combined length stretch in a perimeter of about 1,300 metres (4,300 ft) and covers an area of roughly 11,200 square metres (121,000 ft^{2}). The whole area is geographically and historically interesting.

== History ==
The fortress was built, on the site of earlier fort, by Hrvoje Vukčić Hrvatinić, the founder of Jajce. It is assumed that one of the locations of his death could be Jajce, where he built his tomb, known as Catacombs of Jajce. However, another location of his burial is discussed and that is Zgošća near Kakanj, where the Zgošća Stećak, a burial megalith, was found and assumed that possibly could belonged to Hrvoje.

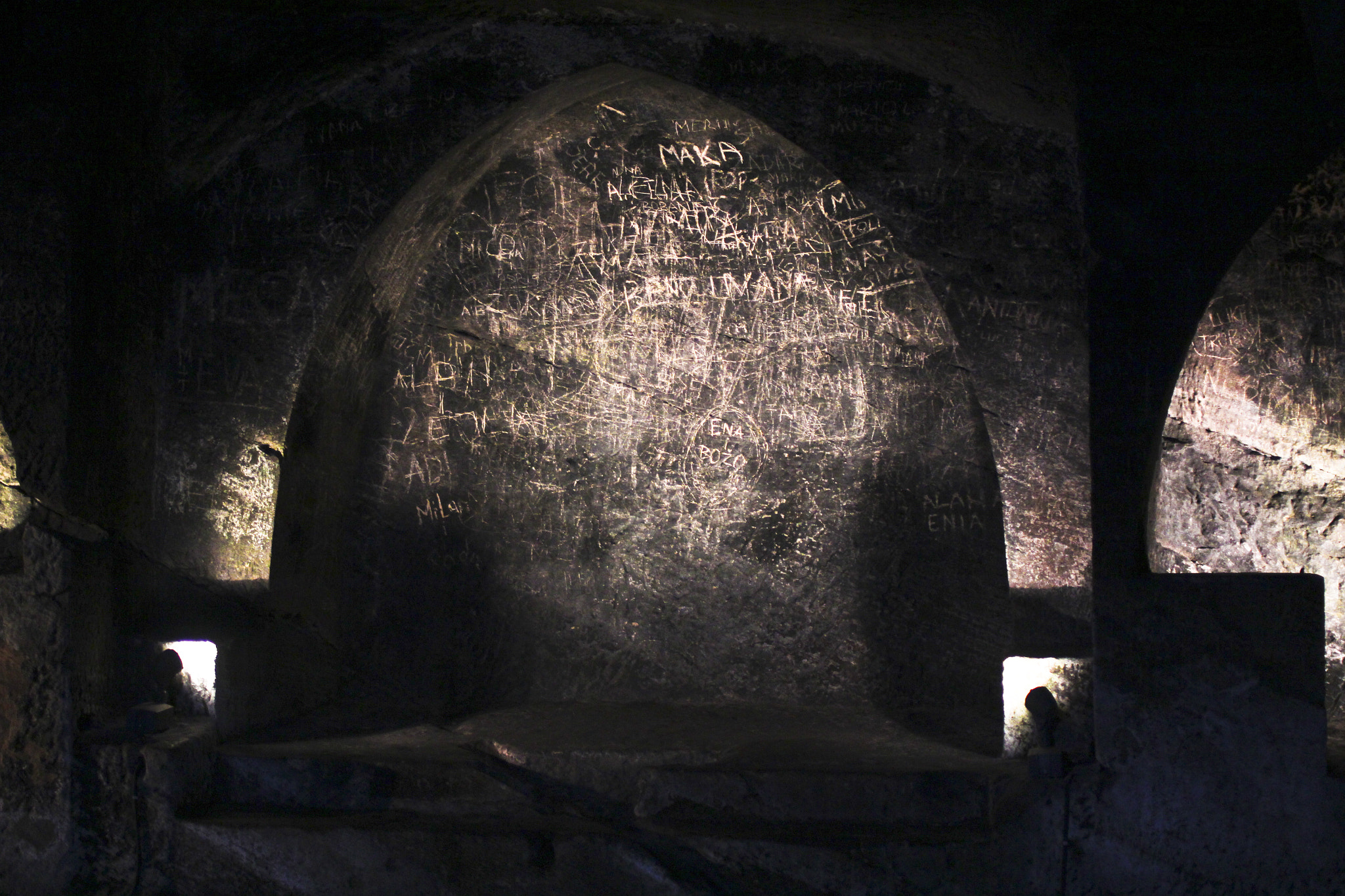
Jajce Catacombs, built by Hrvoje Vukčić.

Later, however, the city became the seat of the Bosnian kings, hence the royal coat of arms decoration on the citadel entrance. A part of the wall was built by the Hungarian King, while the Ottomans erected the powder magazine. The walls are high and the castle was built on a hill that is egg shaped, the rivers Pliva and Vrbas also protect the castle. There is no rampart on the south and west.

Jajce was first built in the 14th century and served as the capital of the independent Kingdom of Bosnia during its time. The town has gates as fortifications, as well as a castle with walls which lead to the various gates around the town. About 10–20 kilometres from Jajce lies the Komotin Castle and town area which is older but smaller than Jajce. It is believed the town of Jajce was previously Komotin but was moved after the Black Death.

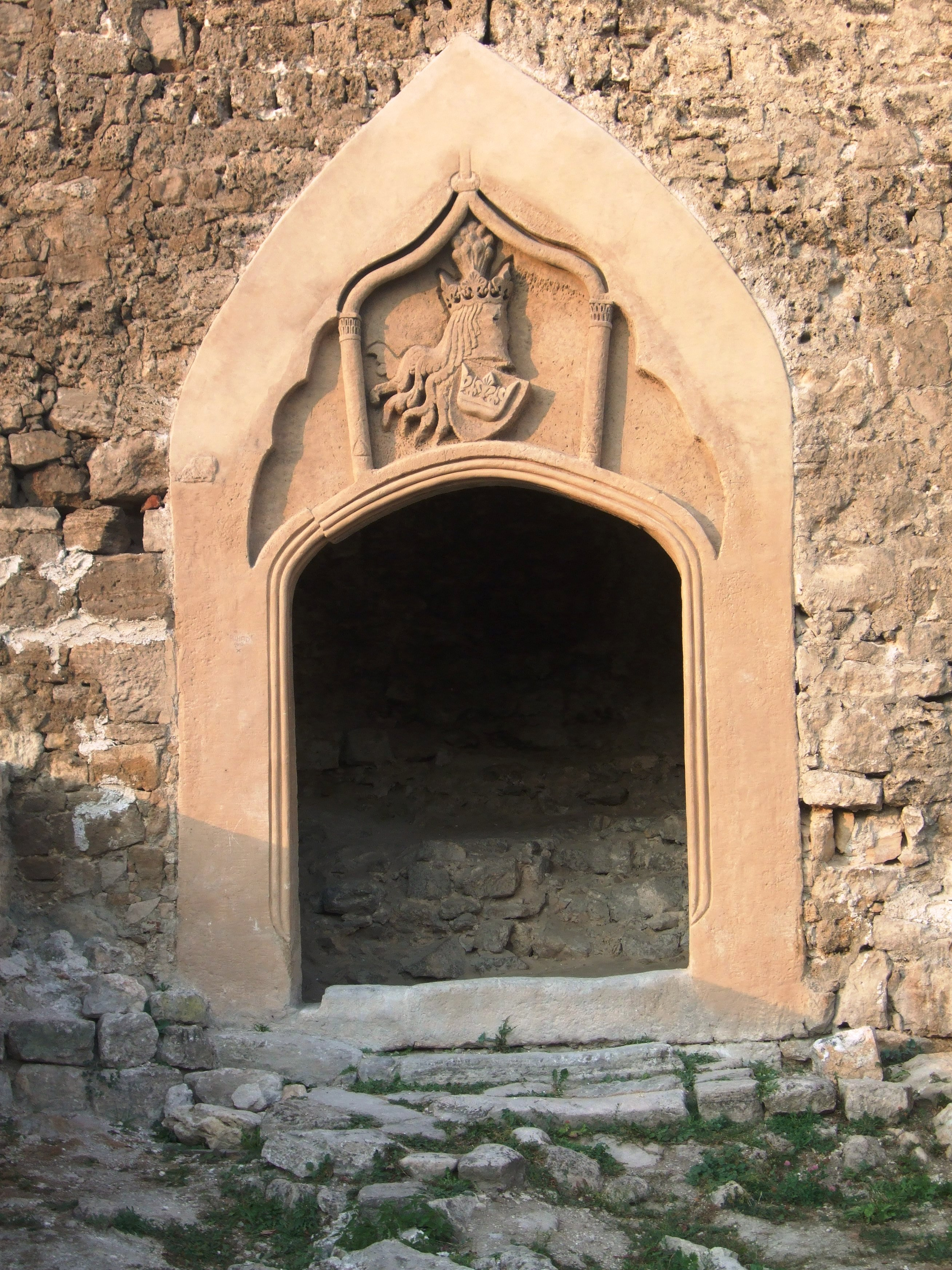
Jajce fortress, southwest entrance was a Main Gate with the royal Kotromanić coat of arms.

The first reference to the name of Jajce in written sources is from the year 1396, but the fortress had already existed by then. Jajce was the residence of the last Bosnian king Stjepan Tomasevic; the Ottomans besieged the town and executed him, but held it only for six months, before the Hungarian King Matthias Corvinus seized it at the siege of Jajce and established the Banovina of Jajce.

Skenderbeg Mihajlović besieged Jajce in 1501, but without success because he was defeated by Ivaniš Korvin assisted by Zrinski, Frankopan, Karlović and Cubor.

During this period, Queen Catherine restored the Saint Mary's Church in Jajce, today the oldest church in town. Eventually, in 1527, Jajce became the last Bosnian town to fall to Ottoman rule. The town then lost its strategic importance, as the border moved further north and west.

Jajce passed with the rest of Bosnia and Herzegovina under the administration of Austria-Hungary in 1878. The Franciscan monastery of Saint Luke was completed in 1885.

== Fortification system ==
=== Citadel and bastions ===
Jajce citadel is the focal point as part of the Walled city of Jajce. It is the first to be built, on the top of the hill called Hum at 470 m.a.s.l., at the end of the 13th and beginning of the 14th century as the fortress for Bosnian Grand Duke, Hrvoje Vukčić. It was surrounded by a small settlement on the eastern slopes, as it is today. It was repaired, rebuilt and enlarged many times since.

Today, the citadel consists of a main portal, decorated with the coat of arms of the royal Kotromanić dynasty, two large bastions, and inside a gun-powder tower. The walls are traversable with a path along the entire length, connecting Great Southern Bastion with the Great Northern Bastion, constructed on the diagonally opposite corners.

=== Ramparts with city gates and watch-towers ===
The ramparts and city gates were added, until it encompassed the entire settlement underneath with its large ramparts. The fortress became a citadel and the focal point of the system of fortifications, whose ramparts combined length stretch in a perimeter of about 1,300 metres (4,300 ft) and covers an area of roughly 11,200 square metres (121,000 ft^{2}).

The walled perimeter encloses Jajce from two sides, with the two main city gates, one at each side, the northern main city-gate the "Banja Luka gatehouse", and the southern main city-gate the "Travnik gatehouse".

The northern perimeter rampart walls stretch from the north-east corner of the fortress, near the Clock Tower, to "Mračna kapija" gate, followed by "Velika tabija" gatehouse and bastion, and from Velika tabija to the "Džikovac tower", from there to "Papaz tower", reaching the northern main city-gate the "Banja Luka gatehouse", and from here wall follows direction toward the river Vrbas, ending at the "Šamić tabije". The western perimeter rampart starts at the western corner of the citadel, near its main portal, and follows southeastern downward direction to "Medvjed tower", than, the wall goes further south of to the Pliva river, than turns to the east toward the southern main city-gate the "Travnik gatehouse", wher it ends.

== Architectural assembly ==
=== National monument ===
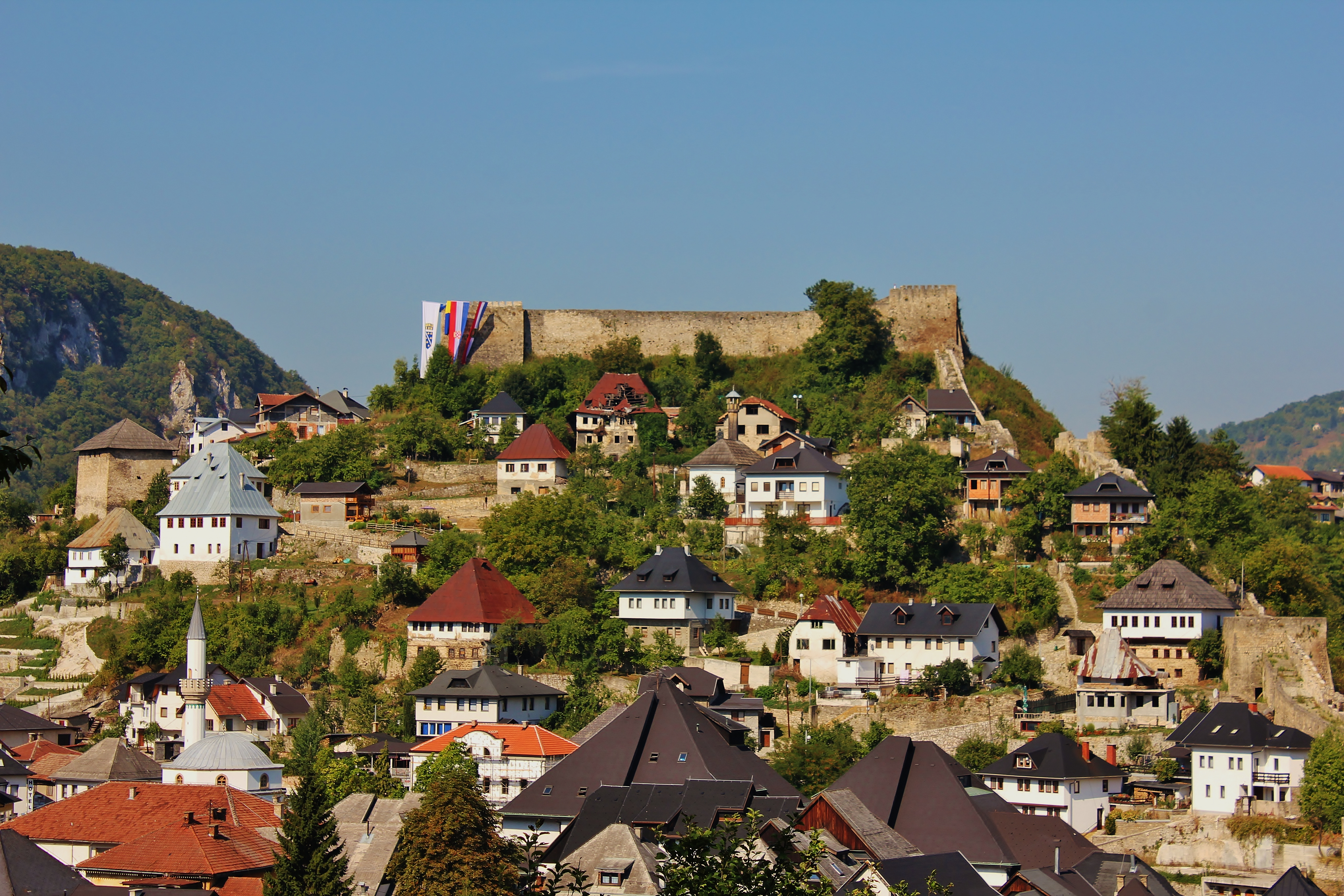
Citadel overlooking an old Walled city of Jajce

The Walled city of Jajce is located at the confluence of the Pliva and Vrbas rivers. It was founded and started developing in the Middle Ages and acquired its final form during the Ottoman period. There are several churches and mosques built in different times during different rules, making Jajce a rather diverse town in this aspect. It is declared National Monument of Bosnia and Herzegovina, and, as the old Jajce city core, including the waterfall, and other individual sites outside the walled city perimeter, such as the Jajce Mithraeum, it is designated as The natural and architectural ensemble of Jajce and proposed as such for inscription into the UNESCO's World Heritage Site list. The bid for inscription is currently placed on the UNESCO Tentative list.

== Gallery ==
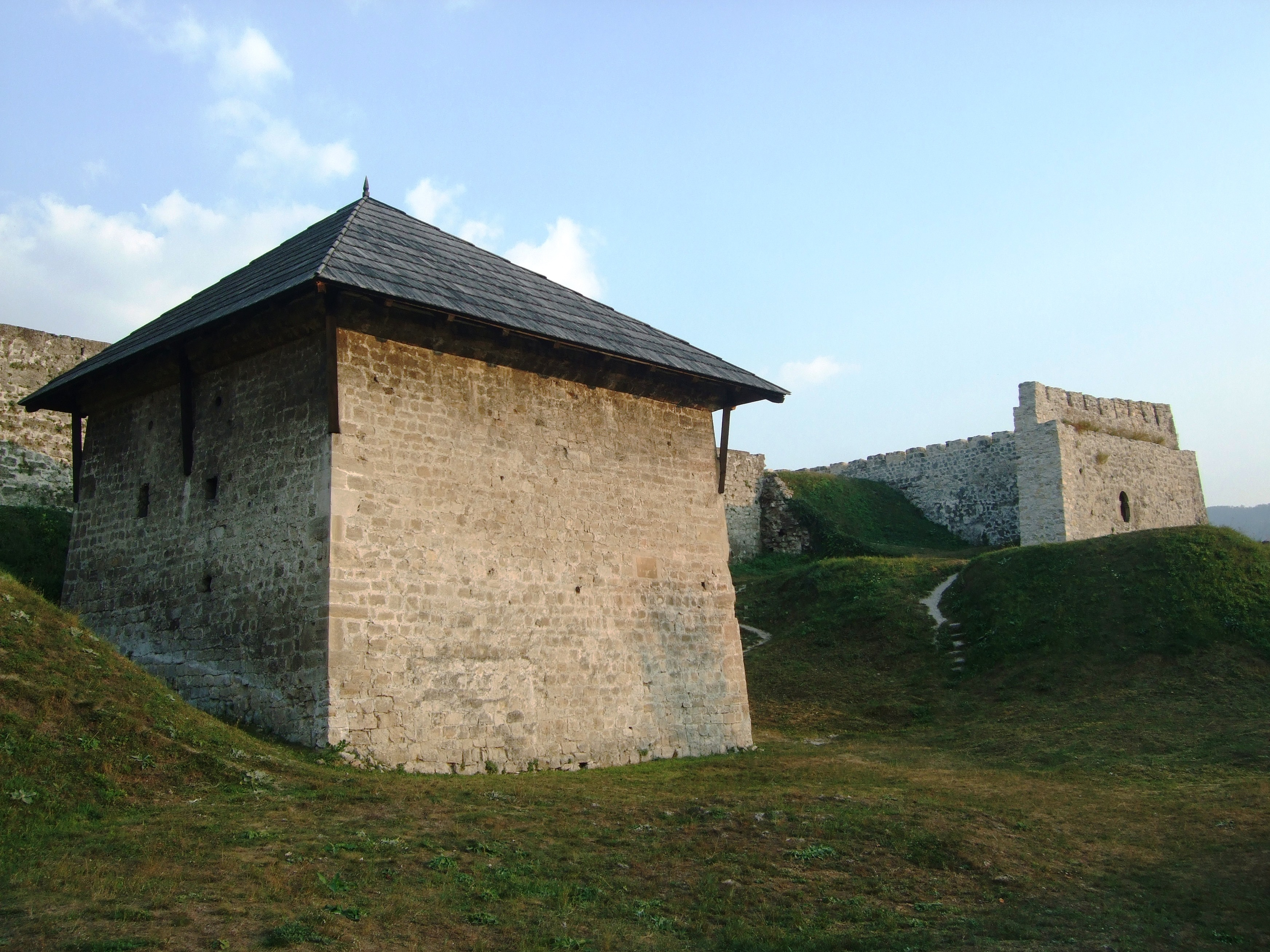
Jajce fortress

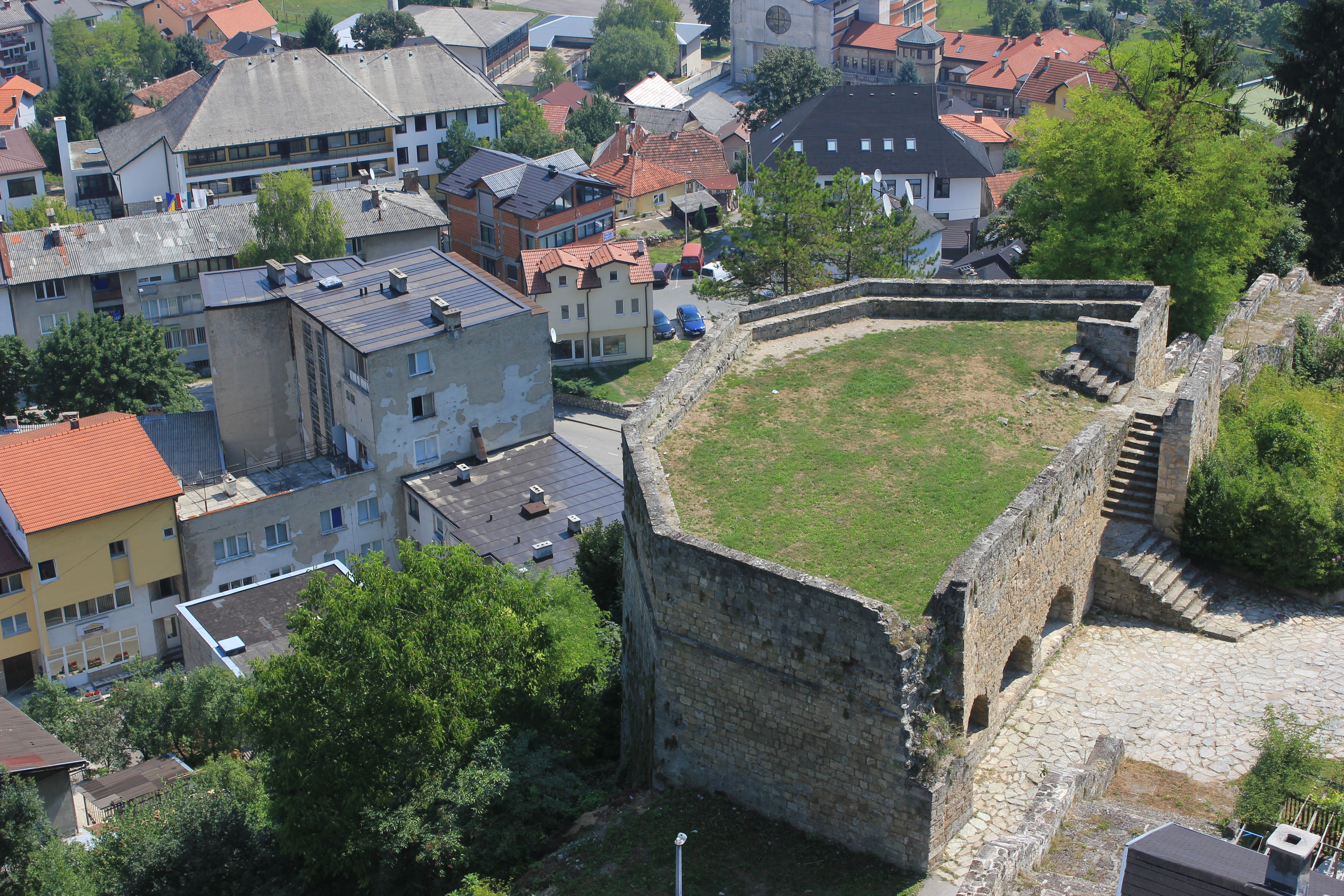
Bastion of Jajce fortress

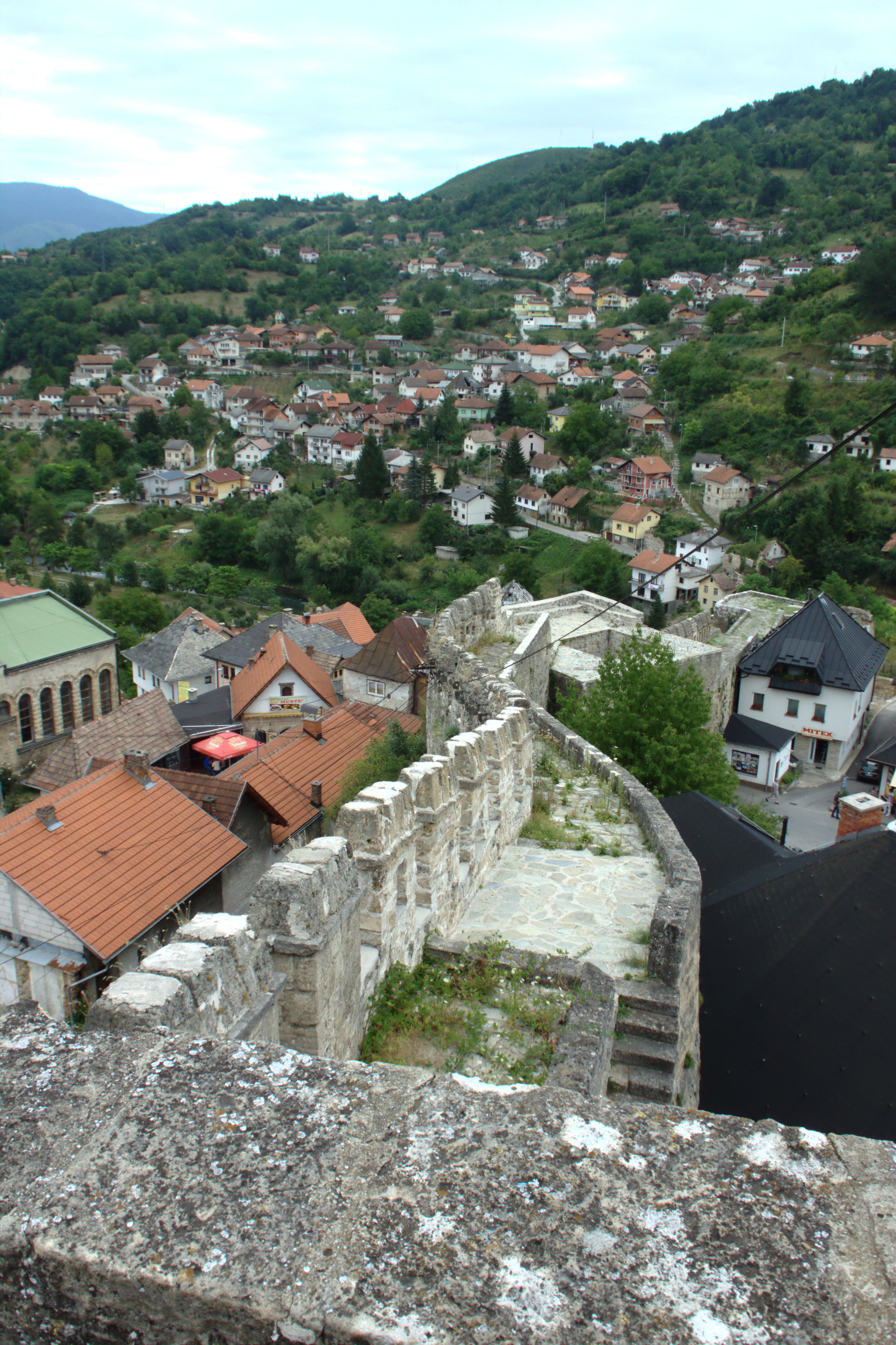
Jajce - a walled city, protected by two rivers and long wall

== See also ==
- Jajce Mithraeum
- Pliva
- Kingdom of Bosnia
