= Konjic Mithraeum =

Archaeological site in Bosnia and Herzegovina

- Konjički mitrej
- Konjički Mithraeum
- Location of Konjic in Bosnia and Herzegovina, where the temple is found
- 43.6614648°N 17.964752°E
- Type: Temple, sanctuary
- Periods: Roman Imperial
- Location: Repovica Hill, Konjic
- Region: Herzegovina-Neretva Canton

History
- Built: early 4th century AD
- Abandoned: Not known

Site notes
- Height: floor level is at ground level
- Length: around 9 metres (30 ft)
- Width: around 5 metres (16 ft)
- Excavation dates: January 1897
- Archaeologists: Karlo Patsch
- Owner: Public

The Konjic Mithraeum, or Konjički Mithraeum (Serbo-Croatian: Konjički mitrej), is a Mithraeum, early 4th century AD temple dedicated to God of the Sun, Mithra, discovered in Konjic, Bosnia and Herzegovina.

== History ==
The mithraeum in Konjic was a temple dedicated to God of the Sun, Mithra. The god was worshiped and cult of Mithraism spread to other parts of Roman Empire, throughout the Mediterranean basin, by slaves and merchants from the Orient, and by Roman soldiers who came into contact with the followers of the cult in the East.

== Discovery and protection ==
The remains of the Mithraeum in Konjic were discovered in January 1897, at the banks of river Trešanica, under village Repovci, on the outskirts of Konjic.

The Konjic site is atypical as its floor level is at ground level. This means that temple main characteristic is absence of cave, hollow ground or even constructed spelaea. The Mithraism followers sought as a norm to found their places of worship in caves, whereas in absence of such topographical features they would excavate the soil, where the terrain permitted, and built small single-celled temple, known as spelaea, to reinforce the impression of a cave. However, in case of Konjic, temple was established on open ground, and only protection and seclusion was provided by dense forest, which disappeared by times of its discovery.

The mithraic relief of Konjic, carved in gray limestone, is two-sided relief, and it shows a Tauroctony in one side and a ritual meal in the other.

It is kept in the National Museum of Bosnia and Herzegovina in Sarajevo, at the Archaeological department of the museum.

== See also ==
- List of National Monuments of Bosnia and Herzegovina
- Jajce Mithraeum
- Golubić Mithraeum
