= Catacombs of Jajce =

Jajce Catacombs
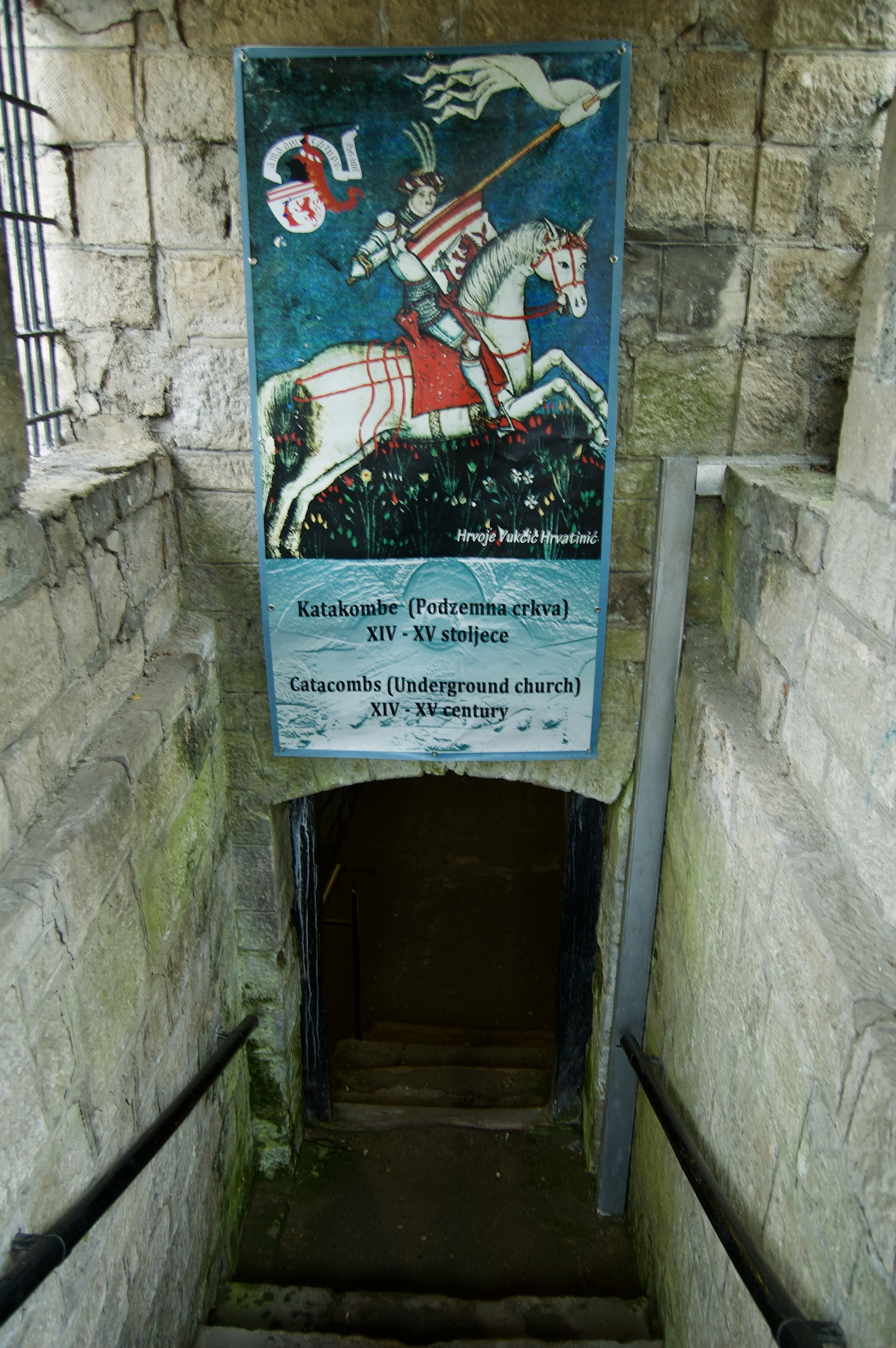

- Location within Bosnia and Herzegovina
- Jajce Catacombs
- 44.3396065°N 17.2682523°E
- Location: Jajce
- Country: Bosnia and Herzegovina
- Denomination: Christian
- Tradition: Bosnian Church

Architecture
- Heritage designation

KONS of Bosnia and Herzegovina
- Official name: Catacombs in Jajce, the historical monument
- Type: Category II monument
- Criteria: A, B, C i.ii.vi., E ii.iv.v., F ii., G i.ii.iii.v.vi., H i., I i.iii.iv.
- Designated: 21 January 2003 (4th session of KONS No: 06-6-742/03-1)
- Reference no.: 274
- State: National Monuments of Bosnia and Herzegovina

The Jajce Catacombs, also known as the Jajce underground church, or simply Jajce crypt in Jajce, Bosnia and Herzegovina, is the historic burial site of Hrvoje Vukčić, a Bosnian nobleman who founded the city and ordered construction of the underground chapel with the crypt around 1400, which was finished before 1416, in time for his burial. The crypt was also meant to serve as the family's burial site.

== Location ==
The underground complex is located on the south-western part of the Walled city of Jajce, in the town's quarter just below the plateau between the Medvjed-kula and the church Church of Saint Mary and its belltower of Saint Luke. Other important religious buildings and facilities were built on the location throughout the history, such as Franciscan friary, a graveyard, and a separate tower for their defence. At first this zone of the town was outside the town's ramparts, but walls encompassed it after second and third phase in fortification's upgrade during the 15th century.

== History ==
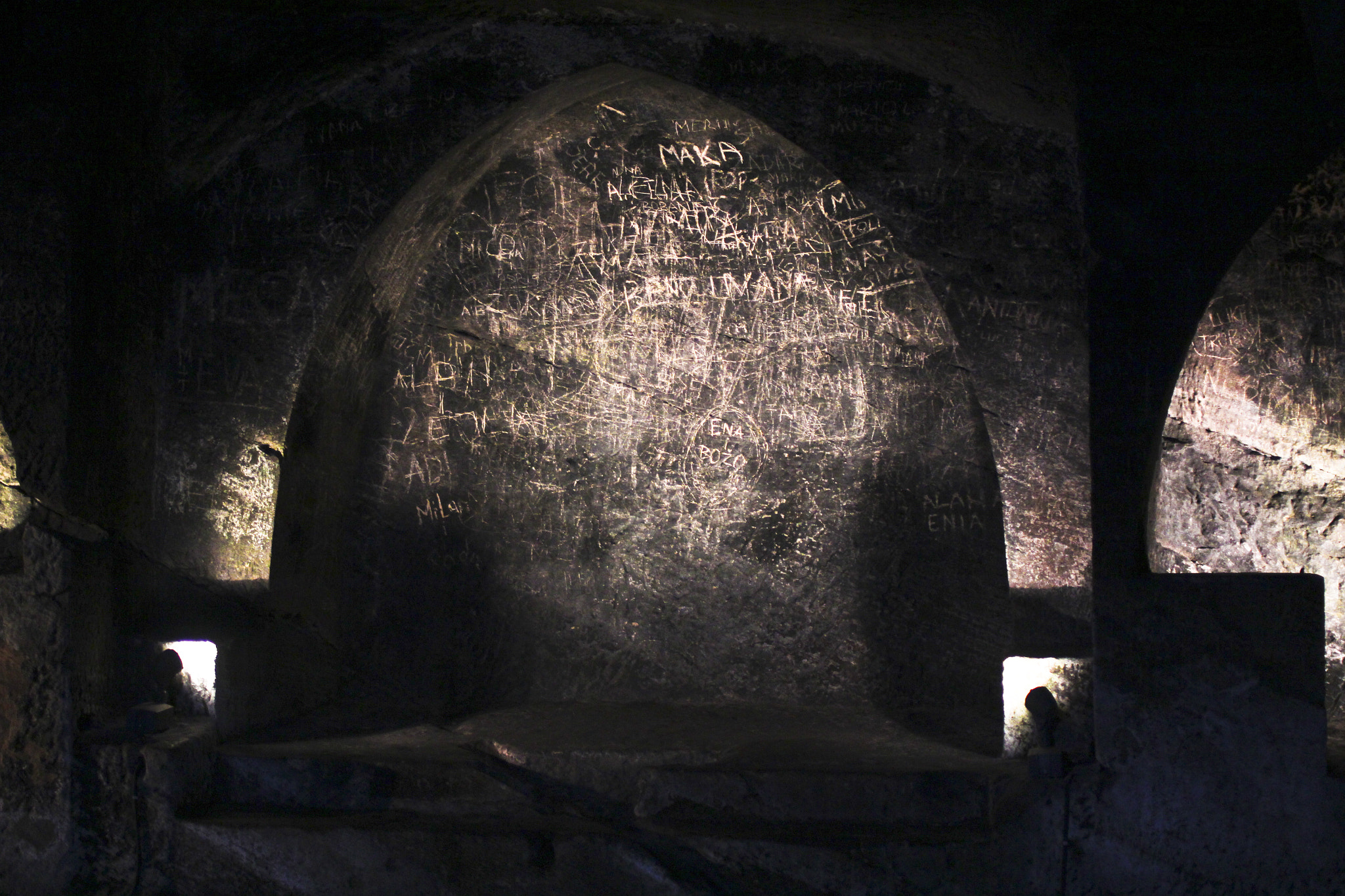
Inside of the Jajce catacombs

The underground structure, now historic monument, was built around 1400, but earlier then 1416 when Grand Duke of Bosnia, Hrvoje Vukčić, who founded the city of Jajce and ordered its construction, died and was laid in his tomb. It was conceived and built to be a church complete, with a narthex, baptismal fonts, a nave, and a presbytery with an altar space. The structure is south–north oriented with the entrance from the southern end. The underground complex was rock-cut into live rock.

== Architectural description ==
The underground spaces are entered through a small and narrow lobby, whose door are also cut into the live rock. In the late 19th or early 20th century, this entrance into the Catacombs was covered with a vaulted entrance at ground level, which was conceived as a protection from elements. There are unfinished carved figures on the lobby's rockface on the both sides of the door, just in front of the narthex. On the left is a male figure, probably holding a spear in one hand, and a lowered sword in the other. To the left, next to a figure, hardly discernible, there is a depiction of what appears to be a heraldic image, with a large helmet and a mantle descending behind the shield, or was supposed to be the top of the helmet, from which springs a hand bent at the elbow with a sword. On the other side is also a carved representation of a female figure with a heraldic sign in her left hand, most likely a fleur-de-lis.

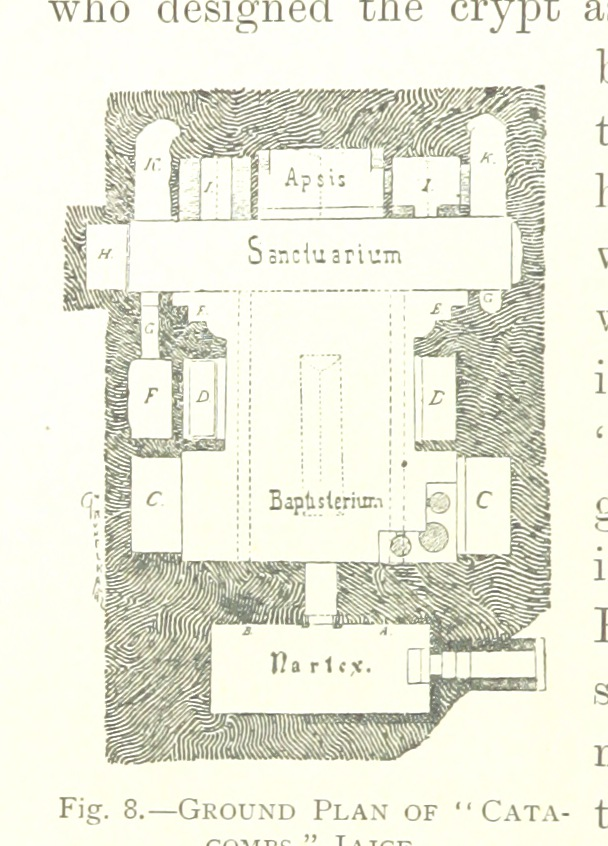
Ground plan of the Catacombs in Jajce

From the middle of the main room, through a rectangular pit, four steep steps descend into a crypt roughly four meters wide and about two meters high. A technical architectural description of the complex has been published by Jajce's agency for cultural, historical and natural heritage and development.

== National monument ==
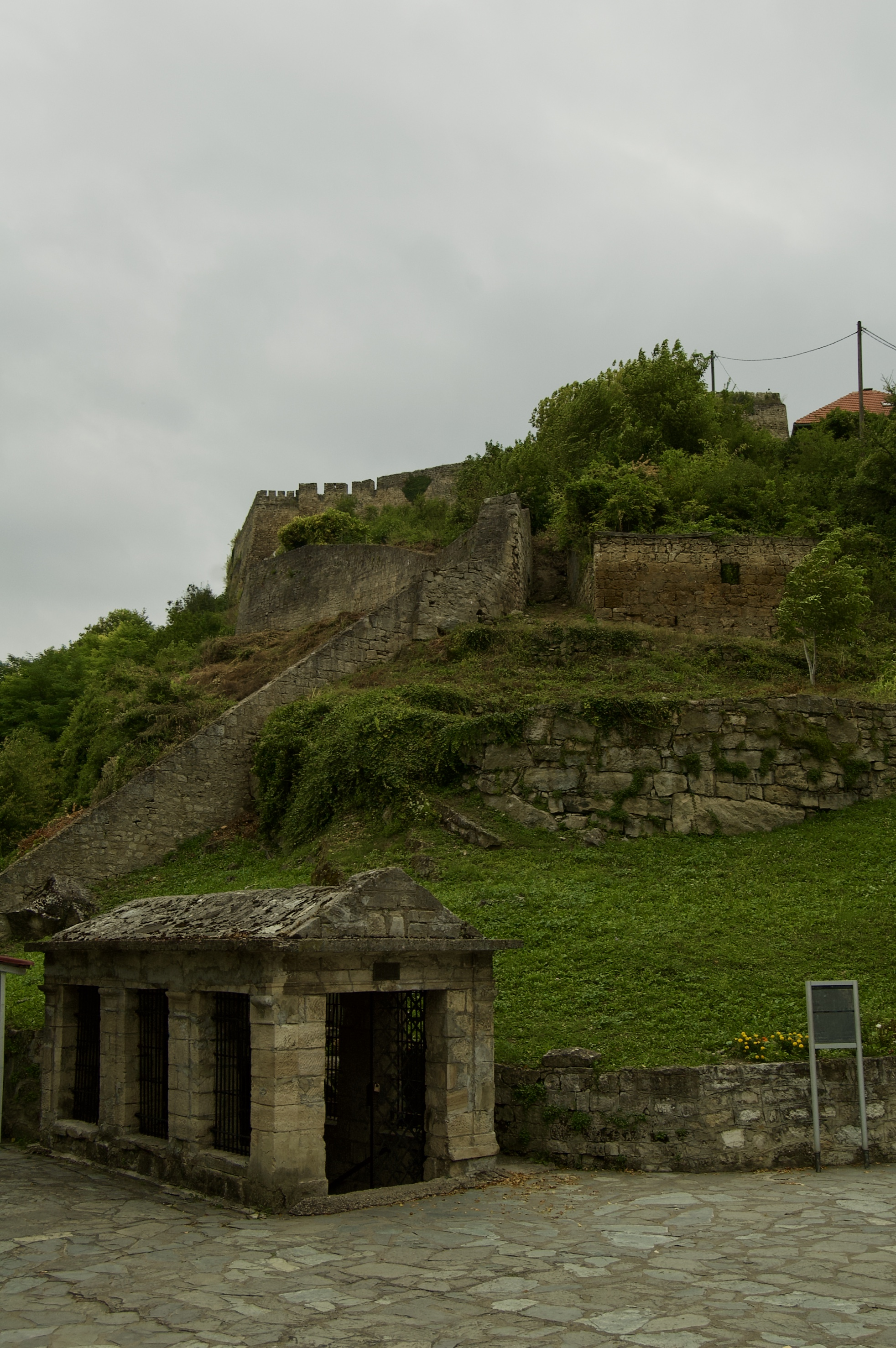
In front of the entrance of the Jajce catacombs

By the Decision No. 06-6-742/03 of the Commission to Preserve National Monuments of Bosnia and Herzegovina, from 21 January 2003, the historic monument of the Catacombs in Jajce is protected as a national monument.

== See also ==
- Jajce Mithraeum
