= Pliva (river) =

River in Bosnia and Herzegovina

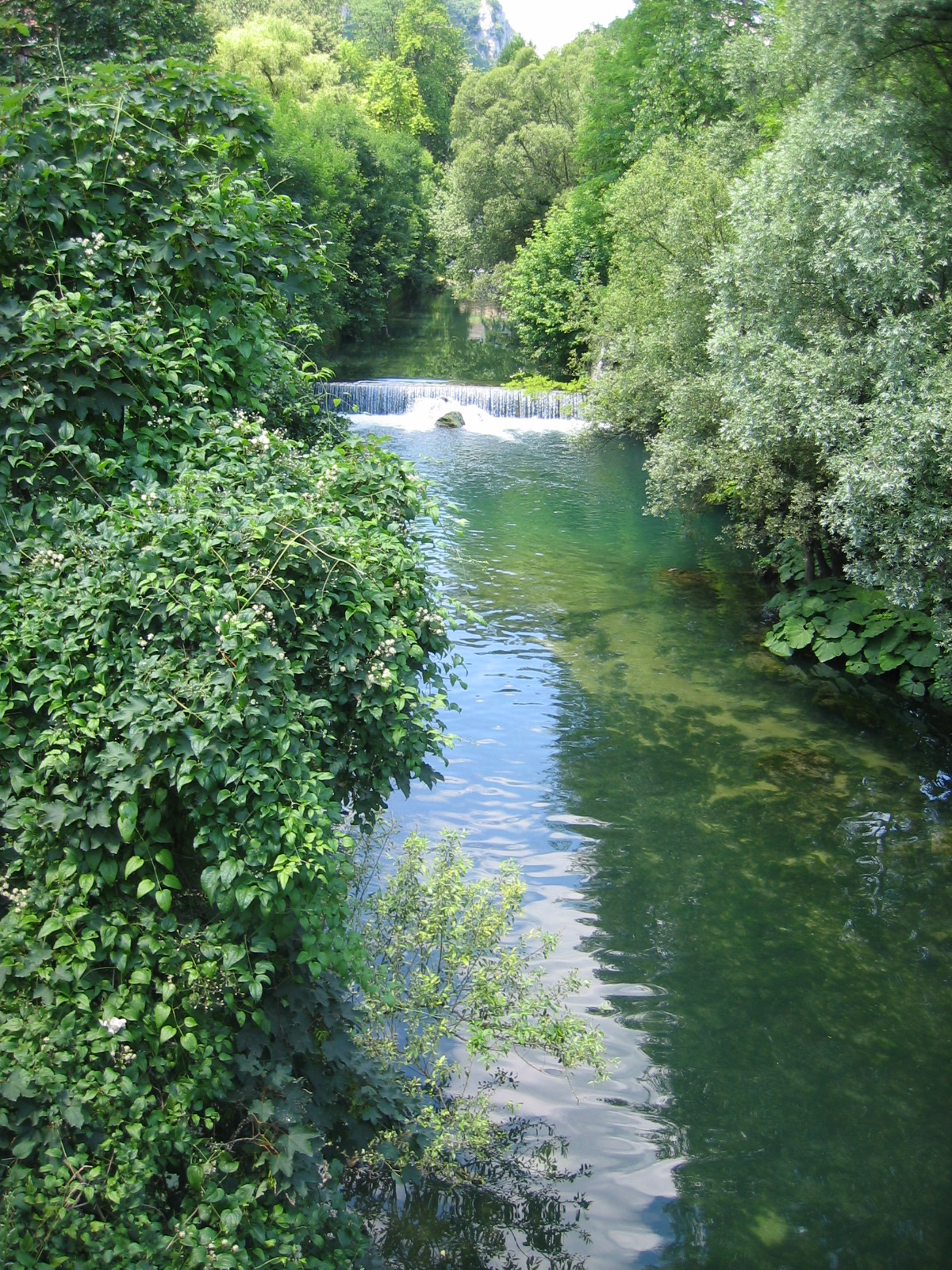
- River Pliva near Jajce, in central Bosnia and Herzegovina, some 100 meters upstream from the waterfall.

- Location within Bosnia and Herzegovina

Location
- Country: Bosnia and Herzegovina
- Region: Central Bosnia and Herzegovina
- District: Central Bosnia Canton
- Cities: Jajce, Šipovo, Jezero

Physical characteristics
- Source: Pljeva
  - location: Smiljevac-Jastrebnjak mountain, Central Bosnia Canton, Central Bosnia and Herzegovina, Bosnia and Herzegovina
  - elevation: 1,227 m (4,026 ft)
- Mouth: Vrbas (river)
  - location: Jajce, Central Bosnia Canton, Central Bosnia and Herzegovina, Bosnia and Herzegovina
  - coordinates: 44.3377°N 17.2706°E
- Length: 26.8 km (16.7 mi)
- Basin size: 1,326 km^{2} (512 sq mi)
- Discharge
  - location: mouth, Jajce, Bosnia and Herzegovina
  - average: 3 m^{3}/s (110 cu ft/s)

Basin features
- Tributaries
  - right: Janj
- Progression: Vrbas→ Sava→ Danube→ Black Sea

The Pliva (Cyrillic: Плива) is a relatively small river in central parts of Bosnia and Herzegovina, however one of the most significant in terms of natural, cultural and historical heritage and value as a natural rarity. For hundreds of years this region was the ultimate stronghold of the Bosnian Kingdom, with the town of Jajce as permanent seat of the last kings of the Bosnian Kingdom.

The entire region of Jajce is rich in natural heritage that cannot be viewed in isolation from the built heritage. In Jajce, these two components are closely intermingled.

== Geography and hydrography ==
The Pliva valley is located in the northern part of central Bosnia and Herzegovina and known for its tranquil mountains rich in forests and abundance of nature, wildlife and especially bodies of water. The valley is dominated by two unique rivers, the Pliva and the Janj and two natural lakes on the Pliva river.

=== Hydrography and sectioning ===
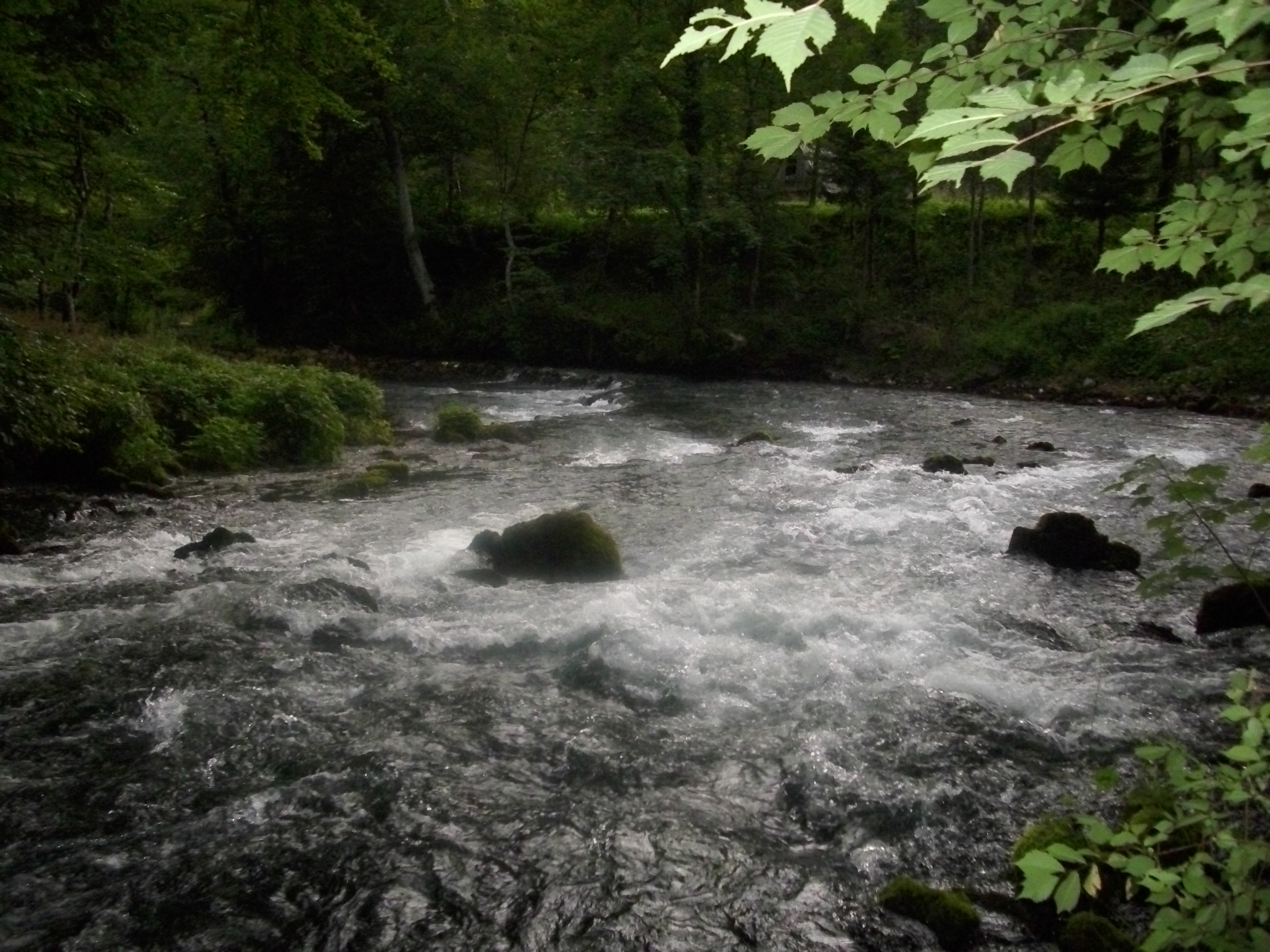
One of springs of Pliva near village Pljeva in Šipovo municipality

The Pliva river flows from West to East, is 26.8 kilometers long, and has an average discharge artificially set for a biological minimum of 3.0 m^{3} near town of Jajce at the waterfall site. Total watershed area of the Pliva is 1,326 km^{2}. Its source is some 8 kilometers upstream of the town of Šipovo near Pljeva at the foot of the mountain of Smiljevac-Jastrebnjak, where the Pliva springs out from two very strong karstic springwells at 483 meters above sea level. The main tributary of the Pliva is the Janj, that flows into the Pliva from the right, in the center of the town of Šipovo. At the confluence, both the Janj and the Pliva are approximately the same size, and both rivers have the same amount of water.

Some 12 kilometers downstream, at the village of Jezero, the Pliva flows into the largest of three lakes, Veliko Plivsko Lake, then into two smaller lakes: Malo Plivsko Lake and Okruglo Lake. After the Pliva river passed through the towns of Šipovo and Jezero, and through both Plivska lakes, it reaches the town of Jajce where it meets with the Vrbas river. The Pliva river is a left tributary of the Vrbas that, on its way north, flows into the Sava river, therefore the Pliva is part of the Sava river basin.

=== Geo-hydrology ===
The river Pliva is characterized by the specific geological nature of the terrain and distinctive morphological and hydrological features, very similar as nearby Una River. The river bed of the Pliva, from the village of Jezero to its confluence with the Vrbas, consists of tufa also known as travertine which forms travertine barriers. In this area the Pliva river has created three natural lakes, Veliko Plivsko Lake, Malo Plivsko Lake and Okruglo Lake, with countless low cascades and travertine barriers (tufa barriers), which causing these lakes to form, slowing the river and deepening it.

== Pliva lakes ==
At the village of Jezero the Pliva flows into the larger of two lakes, Veliko Plivsko Lake (veliko meaning large), then into two smaller Malo Plivsko Lake (malo meaning small) and Okruglo Lake (okruglo meaning round). Both of the Pliva lakes lie in a basin of karstic rock, mainly dolomite and limestone, which has given rise to their most distinctive feature, same as nearby Una River in Bosnia and Herzegovina and Plitvice Lakes in Croatia. The lakes are separated by natural dams of travertine, which is deposited by the action of moss, algae and bacteria. The encrusted plants and bacteria accumulate on top of each other, forming travertine barriers which grow at the rate of about 1 cm per year.

== Pliva and Janj waters utilization ==
=== Hydroelectricity ===
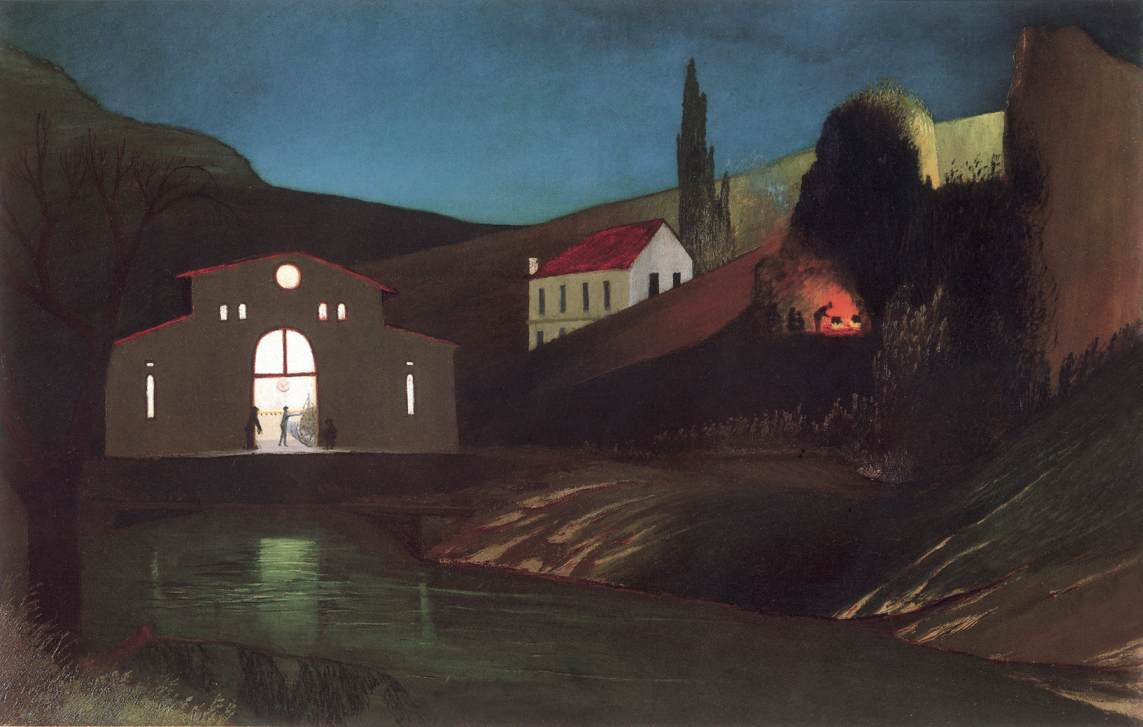
Csontvary Kosztka Tivadar's 1903 painting of an old Pliva hydroelectric power station, constructed on Pliva by the Austro-Hungarian government near the end of the 19th century.

The very first hydroelectric power station in Bosnia and Herzegovina was built on the Pliva river in 1899, Jajce-1. It was also the very first of its kind in the Balkans. This facility was constructed and exploited by Austrian industrialist Dr. Josef Kranz and his "Bosnische-Elektrizitäts AG" company, whose successor later became "Elektro-Bosna". The power station had an installed capacity of 8 MW, and supplied electricity for "Elektro-Bosna" situated in Jajce, the largest chemical factory for production of calcium carbide in Europe at the time. The first hydroelectrical power station in Southeast Europe became operational on 24 March 1899.

After the WWII, Jajce-2 was built on the Vrbas river downstream from Jajce.

Today plans of construction of numerous small hydro power stations on the rivers Pliva and Janj are already undergo, although local population started expressing deep resentment and disapproval, and in some cases organized protests stopping ongoing works, at least for the time being.

=== Janj's "otoke" ===
The Janj is also considered for construction of several small hydro, but location is highly controversial as a place of great natural and environmental value.

=== Pliva watermills ===
There is a cluster of small wooden hut-like watermills on the Pliva, on steep ford where the water spills between two lakes, from upper Veliko Plivsko into lower Malo Plivsko lake. These mills are out of their primary function today, but are preserved and maintained as a national monument of Bosnia and Herzegovina. Local farmers used the mills to grind wheat into flour until the Second World War and some afterward, with a heyday of production being during the days of the Austro-Hungarian Empire.

== Pliva Waterfall ==
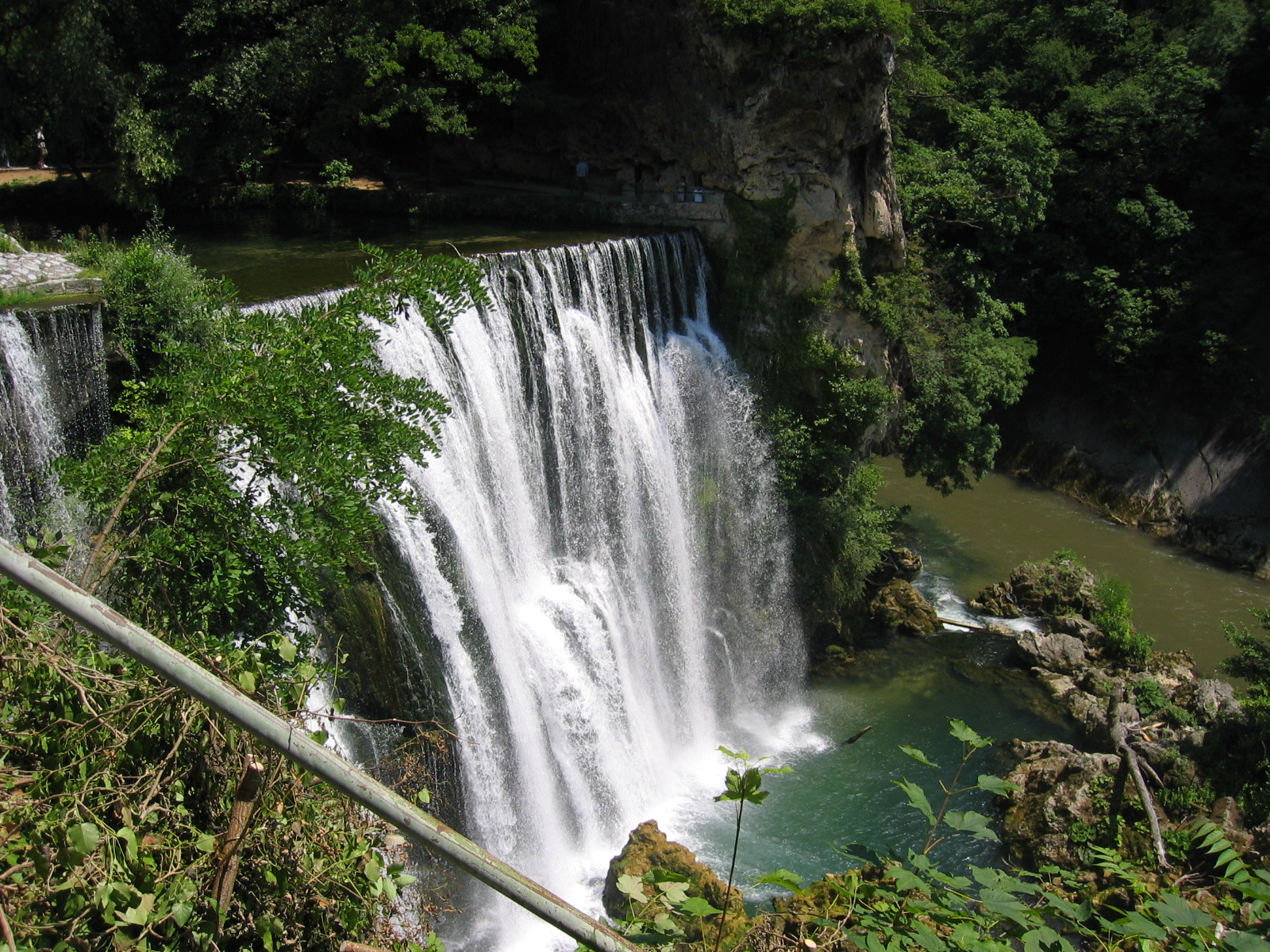
Mouth of Pliva at Vrbas in Jajce

At the confluence with the Vrbas, the Pliva forms a 22 meters high Pliva Waterfall for which the town of Jajce is known amongst other attractions.

== Flyfishing ==
The Pliva river is famous for its clean water, particularly near the source in the mountains and its richness in fish which makes the river so attractive for flyfishing, not just in Bosnia and Herzegovina but also in the region. A part of the 16th FIPS-Mouche European Fly Fishing Championship was held on the lake. The fishing societies Zlatovčica from Jajce and Jezero are managing the fishing from the lake to the confluence with Vrbas.

== See also ==
- Pliva Waterfall
- Una
- List of World Heritage Sites in Bosnia and Herzegovina
