= Malo Plivsko Lake =

Lake on Pliva river in Bosnia and Herzegovina

- Location within Bosnia and Herzegovina
- Interactive map of Malo Plivsko Lake
- Location: Bosnia and Herzegovina
- Coordinates: 44°20′54″N 17°13′52″E
- Type: lake
- Max. temperature: 17 °C (63 °F)
- Min. temperature: 12 °C (54 °F)

Malo Plivsko Lake is a lake of Bosnia and Herzegovina. It is located in the municipality of Jajce.

== See also ==
- List of lakes in Bosnia and Herzegovina
- Veliko Plivsko Lake
- Okruglo Lake
