= Golubić Mithraeum =

Temple of Mitra, Bosnia and Herzegovina

- Golubićki mitrej
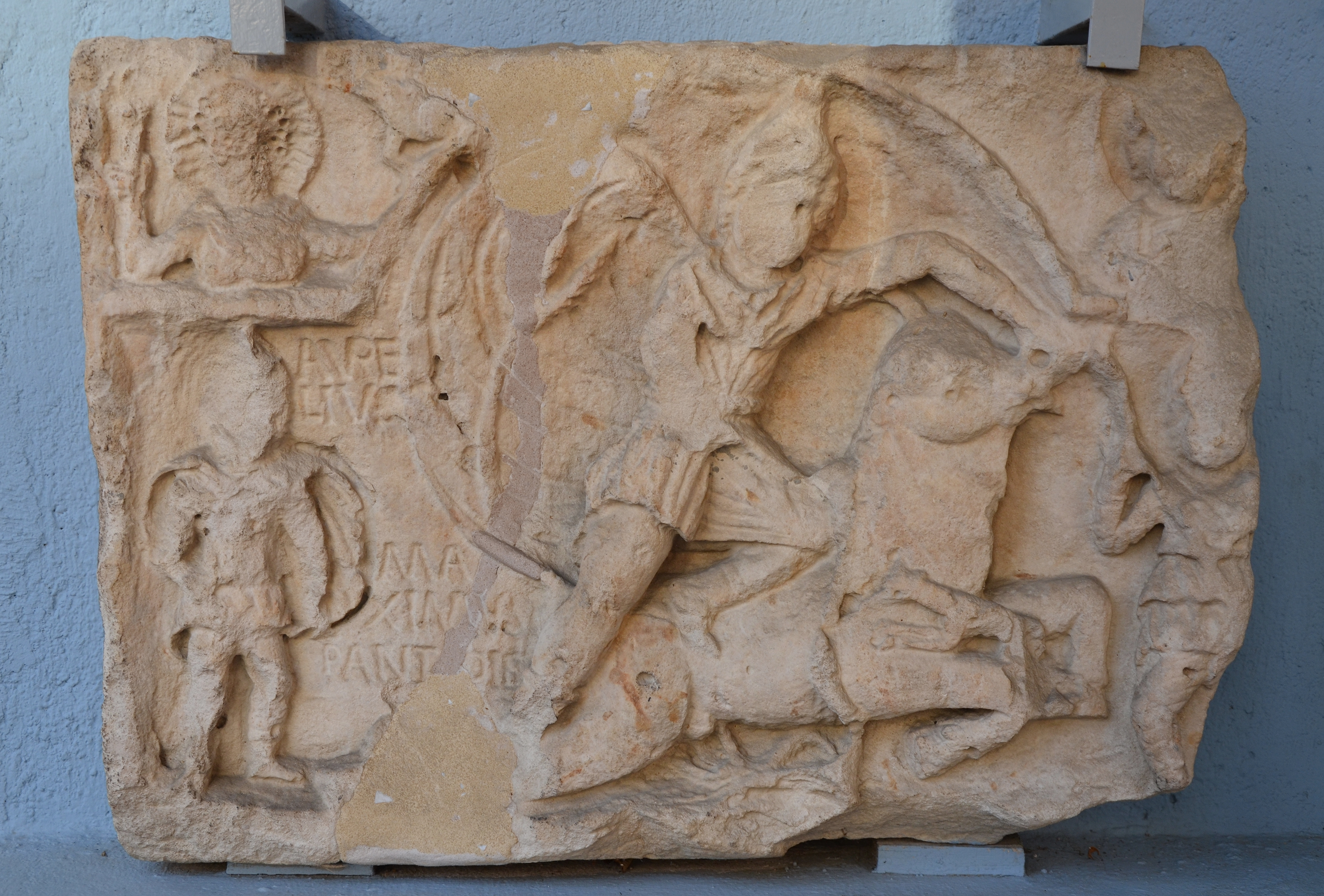
- Mithras relief found in Golubić in Bosnia and Herzegovina, now kept in Archaeological Museum, Zagreb.

- Location of Golubić in Bosnia and Herzegovina, where the temple is found
- Interactive map of Golubić Mithraeum
- 44.787°N 15.9205°E
- Type: Temple, sanctuary
- Periods: Roman Imperial
- Location: Golubić village, near Bihać
- Region: Una-Sana Canton

History
- Built: early 4th century AD
- Abandoned: Not known

The Golubić Mithraeum is an archaeological site of the temple of Mitra, discovered near the village of Golubić, in Bihać municipality, Bosnia and Herzegovina. The Golubić site is an early 4th century A.D. temple dedicated to the God of the Sun, Mithra. The Mithraic cult throughout the Roman Empire, including the territory of present-day Bosnia and Herzegovina, which was part of the Roman province of Dalmatia.

== History ==
Like all other mithraeum sites found in Bosnia and Herzegovina, it was a temple dedicated to the God of the Sun, Mithra. The god was worshiped and cult of Mithraism spread to other parts of Roman Empire, throughout the Mediterranean basin, by slaves and merchants from the Orient, and by Roman soldiers who came into contact with the followers of the cult in the East.

== Description ==
The mithraic relief of Golubić is carved in yellow limestone. It is two-sided relief, showing a Tauroctony on one side and a ritual meal on the other.

This artifact is kept in the Archaeological Museum in Zagreb.

== See also ==
- Konjic Mithraeum
- Jajce Mithraeum
