= Trešanica =

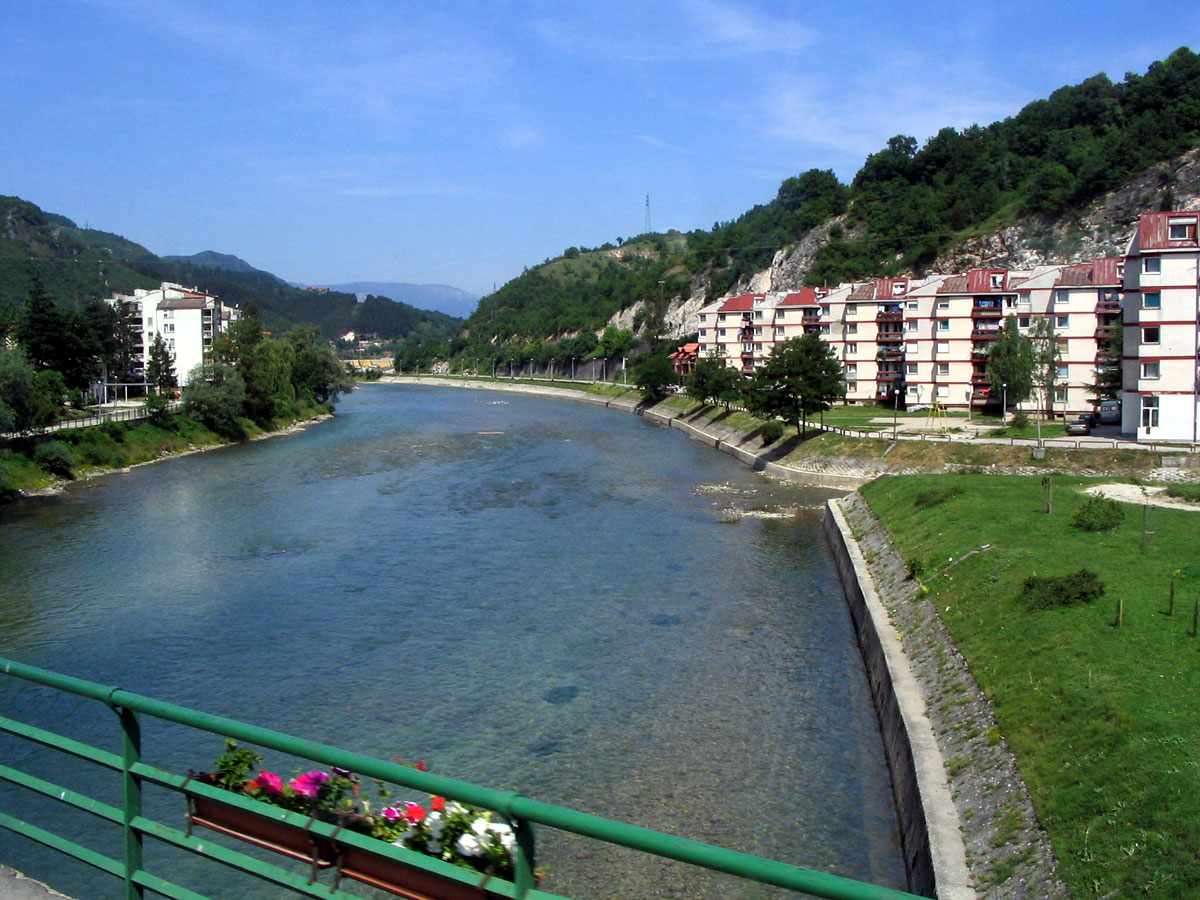
- Confluence of the Trešanica river (flowing from the right) with the Neretva

Location
- State: Bosnia and Herzegovina
- Municipality: Konjic

Physical characteristics
- Source confluence: Bradina
  - location: Konjic
  - coordinates: 43.745531094068255°N 18.01750454365916°E
- Mouth: Neretva
  - location: Konjic
  - coordinates: 43.65519210674808°N 17.96008350730524°E
- Length: 33 km (21 mi)

Basin features
- Progression: Trešanica-Neretva-Adriatic Sea
- River system: Neretva
- Landmarks: Konjic Mithraeum
- Cities: Konjic

Trešanica is a right tributary of the Neretva River in the territory of the municipality of Konjic in Bosnia and Herzegovina.

It springs from the slopes of Mt. Bitovnja, just above town of Bradina. Its turbulent (it is assumed that is why it got its name) flow of about 30 km of clear mountain water is full of waterfalls, rapids, and cascades.

Its confluence with the Neretva River is located in the center of the city of Konjic, which in part lies right at the confluence and banks of the Trešanica River.
