= Great Pliva Lake =

Lake on Pliva river in Bosnia and Herzegovina

Veliko Plivsko Lake
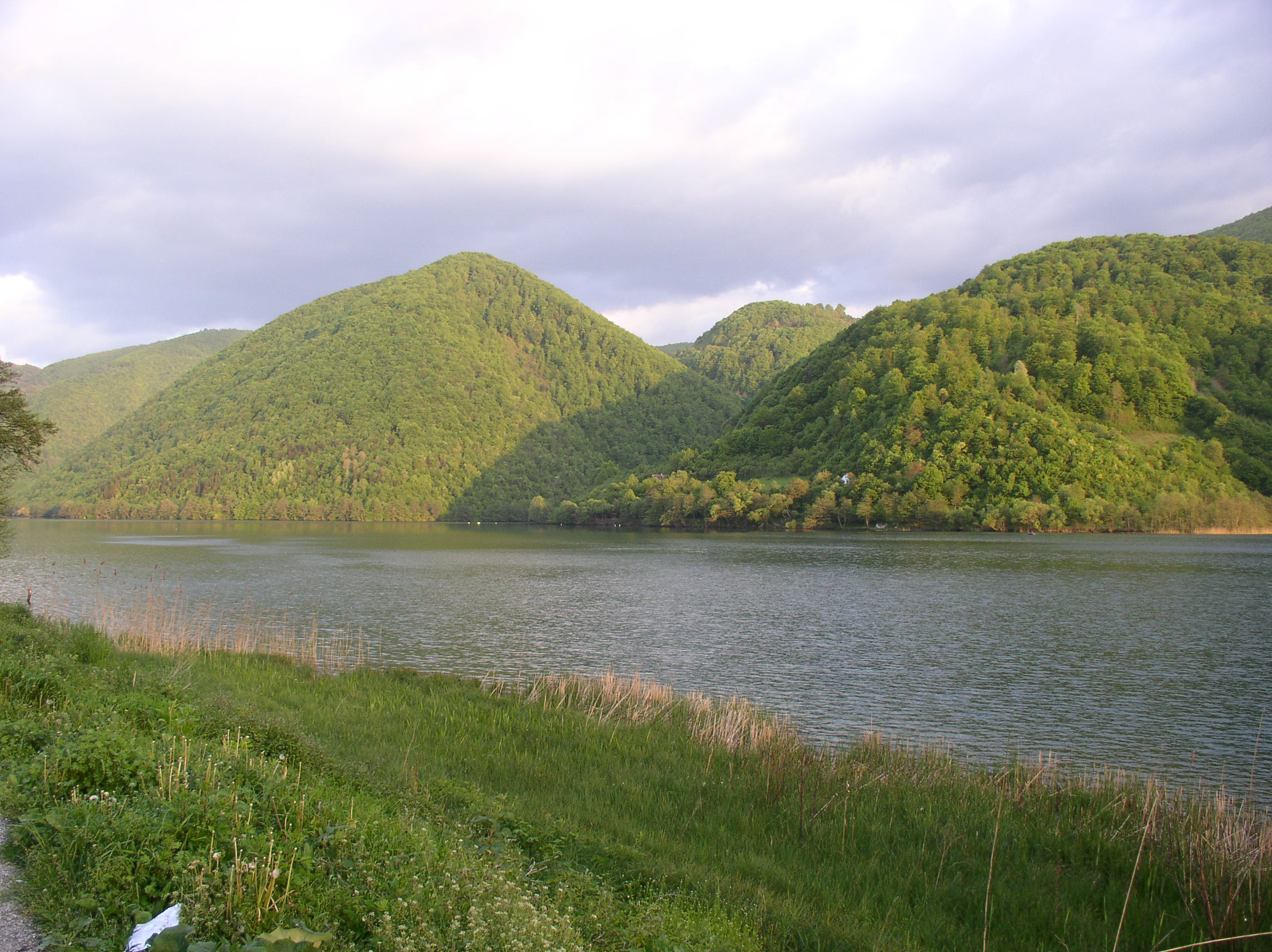
- Veliko Plivsko Lake

- Location within Bosnia and Herzegovina
- Interactive map of Veliko Plivsko Lake
- Location: Jajce, Bosnia and Herzegovina
- Coordinates: 44.3435°N 17.2198°E
- Type: lake
- Max. temperature: 17 °C (63 °F)
- Min. temperature: 12 °C (54 °F)

Great Pliva Lake, or Great Plivsko Lake, or Veliko Plivsko Lake, in Serbo-Croatian Veliko Plivsko Jezero, or simplly Great Lake / Veliko Lake, is a natural lake on the Pliva river in Bosnia and Herzegovina. Like the all major lakes on Pliva, Malo Plivsko Lake, and Okruglo Lake, the Great Lake is also created by a tufa barriers deposited by the river. It is the largest lake in a series of Pliva river lakes, ponds, rapids, and waterfalls, the largest of which is Jajce Waterfall, all created by a numerous travertines made of tufa deposits. It is located in the municipality of Jajce.

== See also ==
- List of lakes in Bosnia and Herzegovina

== Bibliography ==
- ephzhb.ba Jajce 1-2 brosura (2014). "Jajce I i II brošura" [Jajce I and II brochure] (pdf). ephzhb.ba (in Serbo-Croatian and English).
