= Pliva Waterfall =

- Plivski vodopad
- Jajce Waterfall
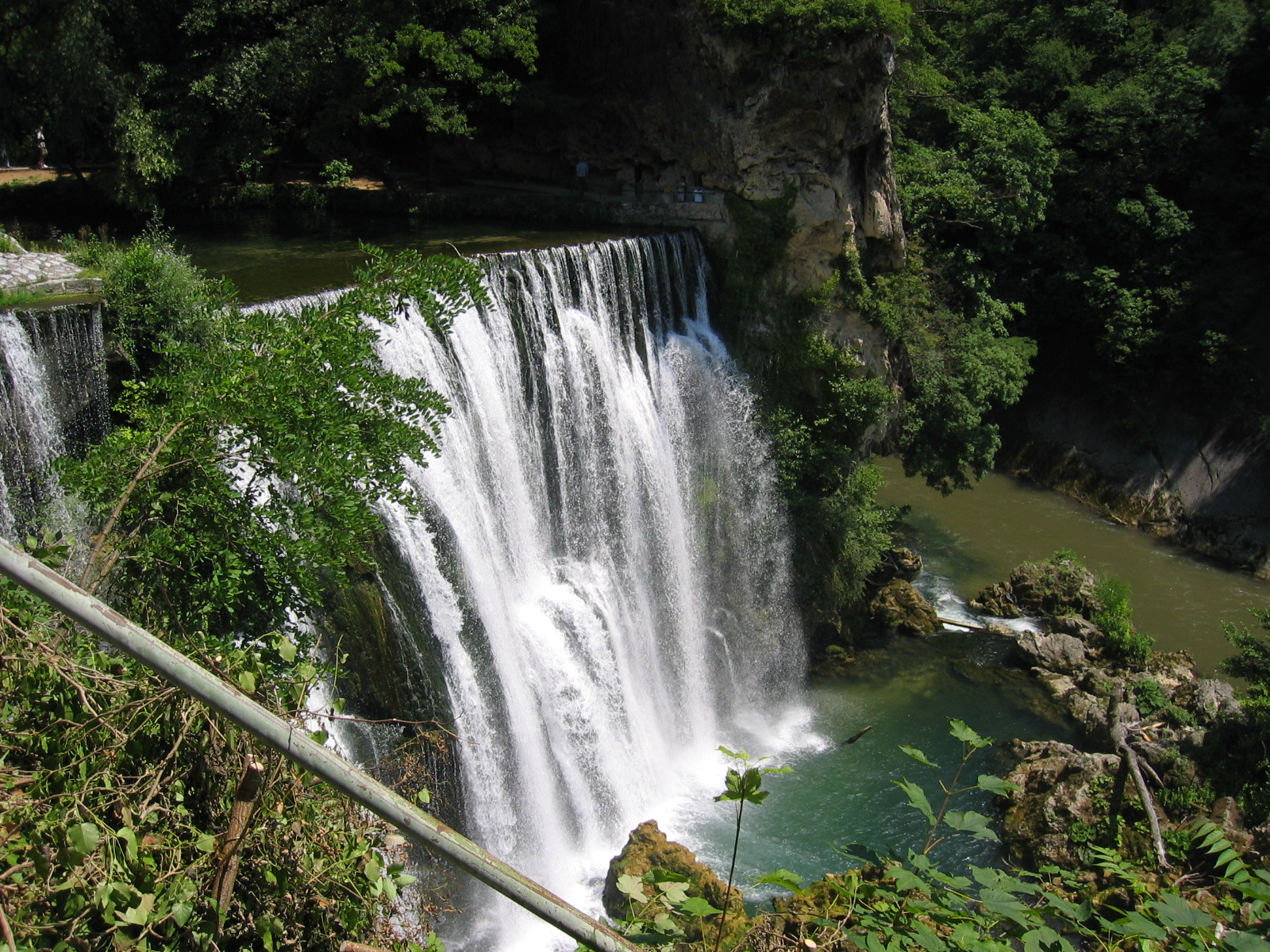
- Waterfall on the Pliva river, in Jajce, Bosnia

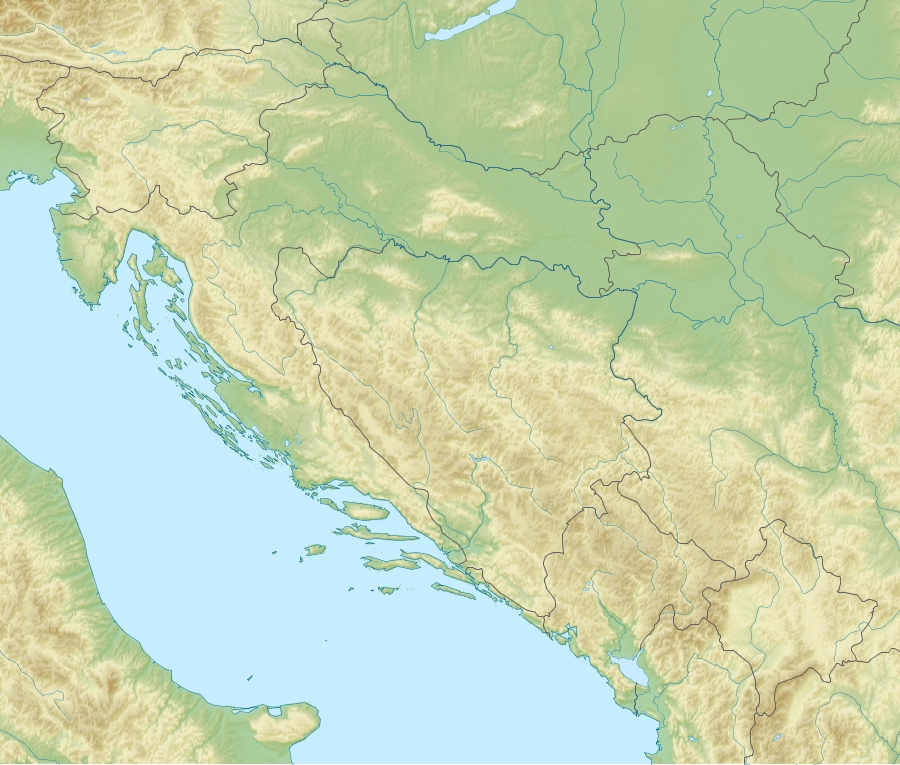
- Location within Bosnia and Herzegovina Location within Dinaric Alps
- Location: Jajce, Bosnia and Herzegovina
- Coordinates: 44.3377°N 17.2706°E
- Type: Segmented
- Elevation: 1,000 m (3,300 ft)
- Total height: 22 m (72 ft)
- Number of drops: 1
- Longest drop: 30 m (98 ft)
- Average width: 30 m (98 ft)
- Watercourse: Pliva river
- Average flow rate: 3 m^{3}/s (110 cu ft/s)

The Pliva Waterfall (Cyrillic|Пливски водопад) is located by the town of Jajce, in central Bosnia and Herzegovina, where the river Pliva meets the river Vrbas. The waterfall is a large tufa barrier, making a cascade in a narrow karstic zone, which follows the Pliva course, retracted into a flysh and limestone contact zone. It was 30 meters high, but after an earthquake during the Bosnian war and attacks on the power plant further up the river, the area was flooded and now the waterfall is 22 meters high.

The old Jajce walled city core, including the waterfall and other individual sites outside the walled city perimeter, such as the Jajce Mithraeum, is designated as The natural and architectural ensemble of Jajce and proposed for inscription into the UNESCO's World Heritage Site list. The bid for inscription is currently placed on the UNESCO Tentative list.

== Scenery ==
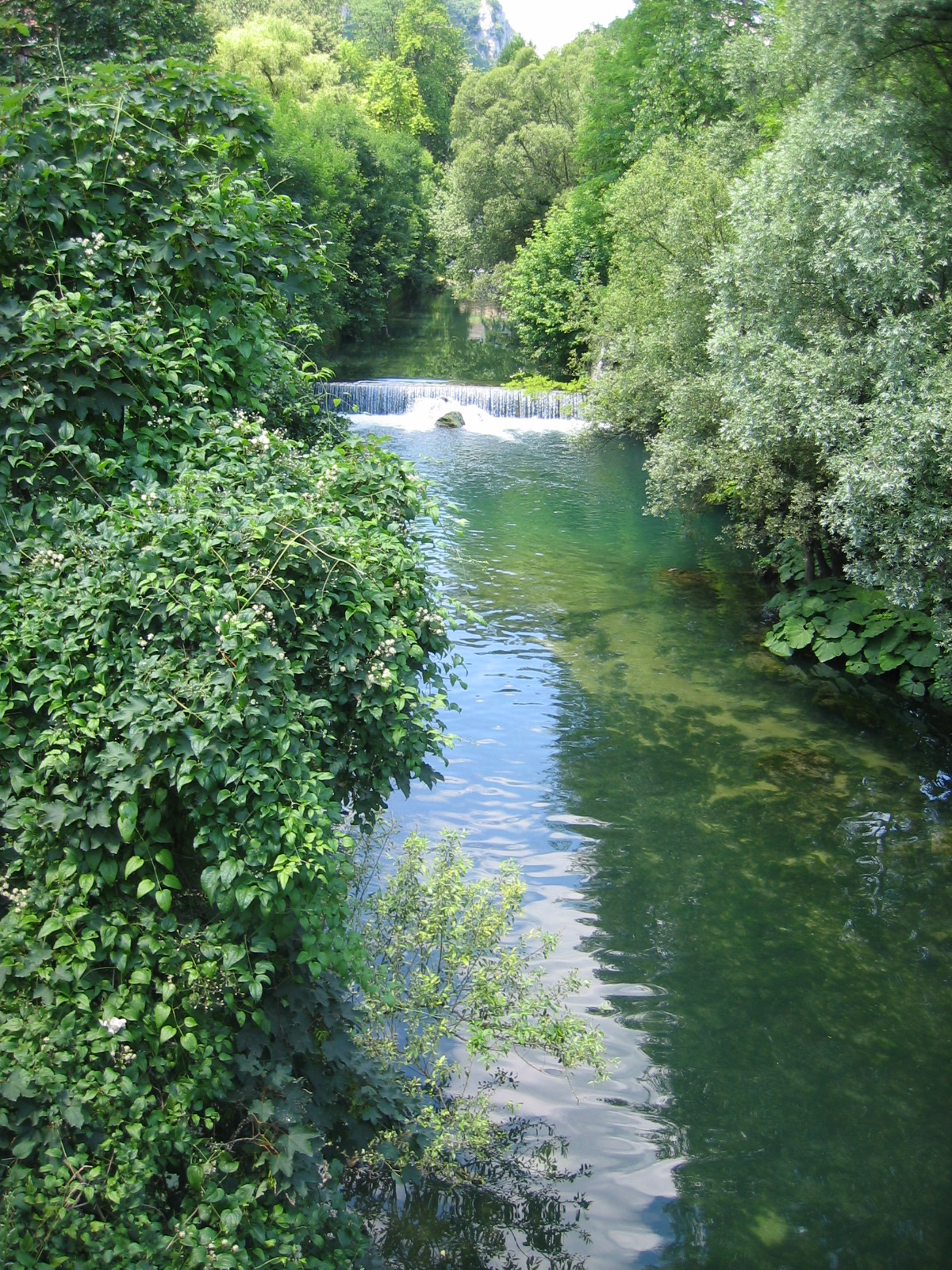
River Pliva near Jajce, in central Bosnia, some 100 meters upstream from the waterfall

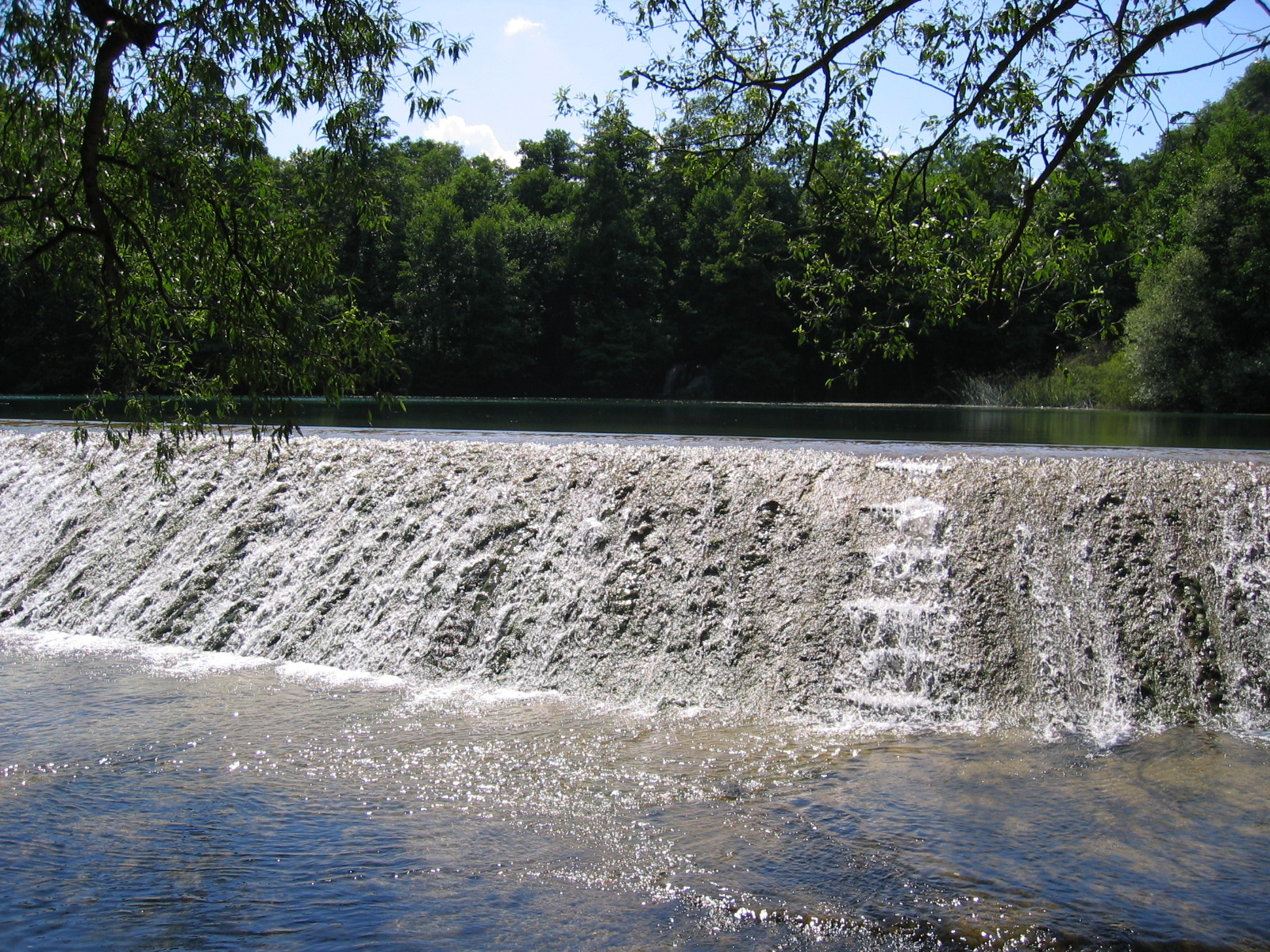
Upstream one can find several more smaller waterfalls

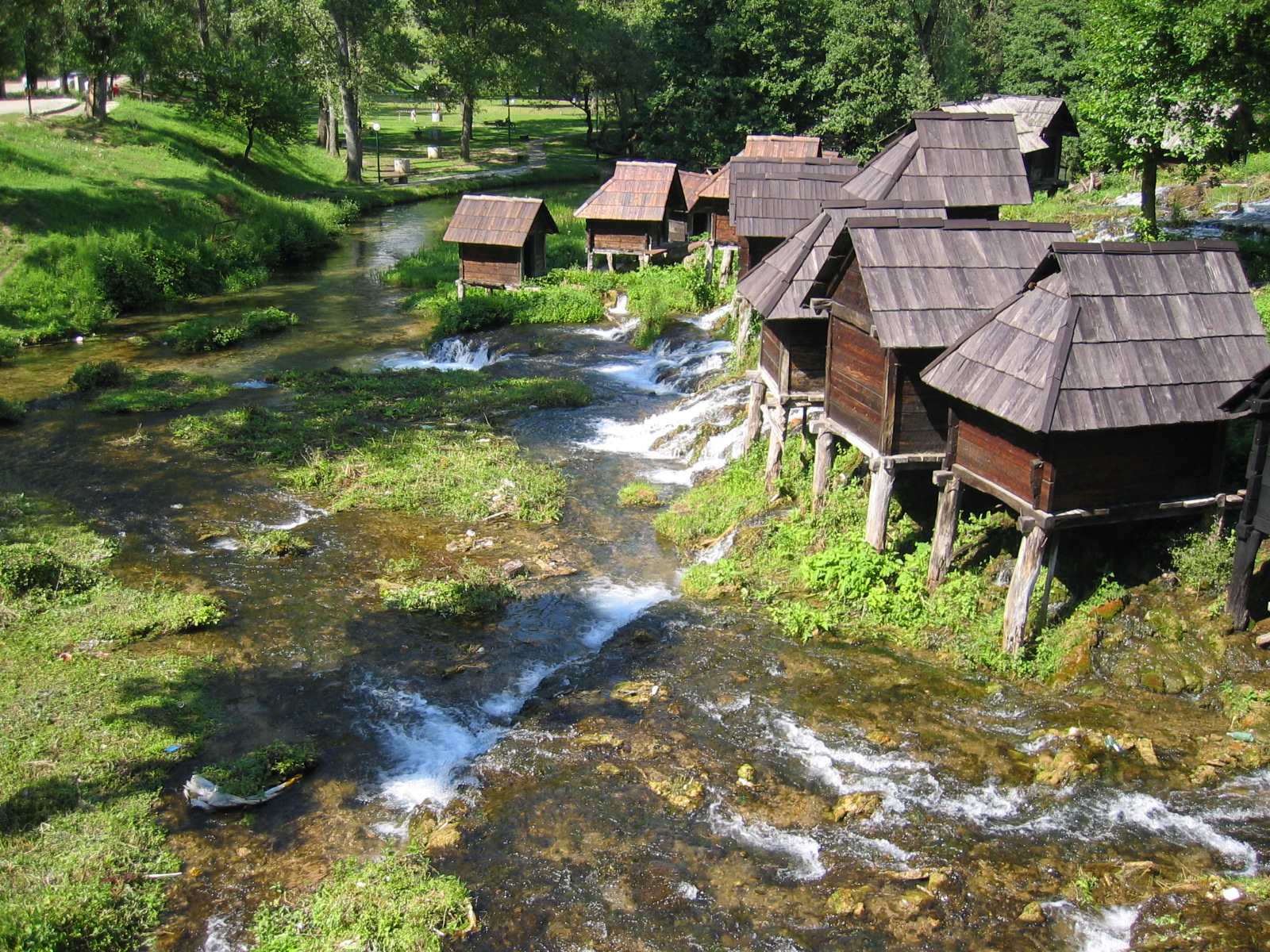
Watermills 4 km upstream

== See also ==
- List of waterfalls
