= Repovci =

Repovci Реповци
- Village
- Location within Bosnia and Herzegovina
- Coordinates: 43°45′N 17°58′E
- Country: Bosnia and Herzegovina
- Entity: Federation of Bosnia and Herzegovina
- Canton: Herzegovina-Neretva
- Municipality: Konjic

Area
  - Total: 4.62 sq mi (11.96 km^{2})

Population (2013)
  - Total: 137
  - Density: 29.7/sq mi (11.5/km^{2})
- Time zone: UTC+1 (CET)
  - Summer (DST): UTC+2 (CEST)

Repovci (Cyrillic: Реповци) is a village in the municipality of Konjic, Bosnia and Herzegovina.

== Demographics ==
According to the 2013 census, the population of Repovci was 137.

Ethnicity in 2013
Ethnicity	Number	Percentage
Bosniaks	137	100%
Total	137	100%
