= Jajce-2 Hydroelectric Power Station =

Jajce-2
- Location within Bosnia and Herzegovina
- Interactive map of Jajce-2
- Official name: Jajce II Hydroelectric Power Plant
- Country: Bosnia and Herzegovina
- Location: Jajce
- Coordinates: 44.411737°N 17.263513°E
- Purpose: Electricity generation
- Status: Operational
- Opening date: 1954
- Owner: Government of the FBiH
- Operator: JP "Elektroprivreda HZHB"

Dam and spillways
- Type of dam: Arch dam
- Impounds: Vrbas
- Height: 1,950 m (6,400 ft)
- Spillways: 4
- Spillway type: 4 overflow spillways in crown; base evacuation via primary low-level outlet; evacuation via diversion tunnel
- Spillway capacity: 1.150 m3/s

Reservoir
- Total capacity: 3,9 hm3
- Active capacity: 2,1 hm3
- Normal elevation: 329,00 m n.m

Jajce II Hydroelectric Power Plant
- Coordinates: 44.428252°N 17.240091°E
- Operator: JP "Elektroprivreda HZHB"
- Commission date: 1954
- Type: diversion
- Hydraulic head: 42 m (neto)
- Turbines: 3x10 MW Francis
- Installed capacity: 30 MW
- Capacity factor: 0,8
- Overall efficiency: 91,4%
- Annual generation: 156 GWh, (175 GWh)

Jajce II Hydroelectric Power Station is a diversion type of hydroelectric power plant on the Vrbas river, whose and powerhouse (generation hall, generating station or generating plant) is situated underground 17 km downstream from town of Jajce, in Bosnia and Herzegovina. It use 3x10 MW generators, with total installed capacity of 30 MW.

== See also ==
- List of power stations in Bosnia-Herzegovina
- Vrbas
- Jajce I Hydroelectric Power Station
