= Okruglo Lake =

Lake on Pliva river in Bosnia and Herzegovina

- Okruglo Plivsko Lake
- Location of the lake in Bosnia and Herzegovina.
- Interactive map of Okruglo Lake
- Location: Bosnia and Herzegovina
- Coordinates: 44.348214°N 17.240329°E
- Type: lake
- Etymology: circular shape
- Part of: Plivska Lakes
- Primary inflows: Pliva
- River sources: Pliva
- Primary outflows: Pliva
- Managing agency: agencija-jajce.ba
- Max. temperature: 17 °C (63 °F)
- Min. temperature: 12 °C (54 °F)

Okruglo Lake, or Okruglo Plivsko Lake is a lake on the Pliva river in Bosnia and Herzegovina. It is located in the municipality of Jajce.

== See also ==
- Veliko Plivsko Lake

== Bibliography ==
- ephzhb.ba Jajce 1-2 brosura (2014). "Jajce I i II brošura" [Jajce I and II brochure] (pdf). ephzhb.ba (in Serbo-Croatian and English).
