= Jajce Mithraeum =

Roman-era temple to Mithra in Jajce, Bosnia and Herzegovina

- Jajački mitrej
- Jajački Mithraeum
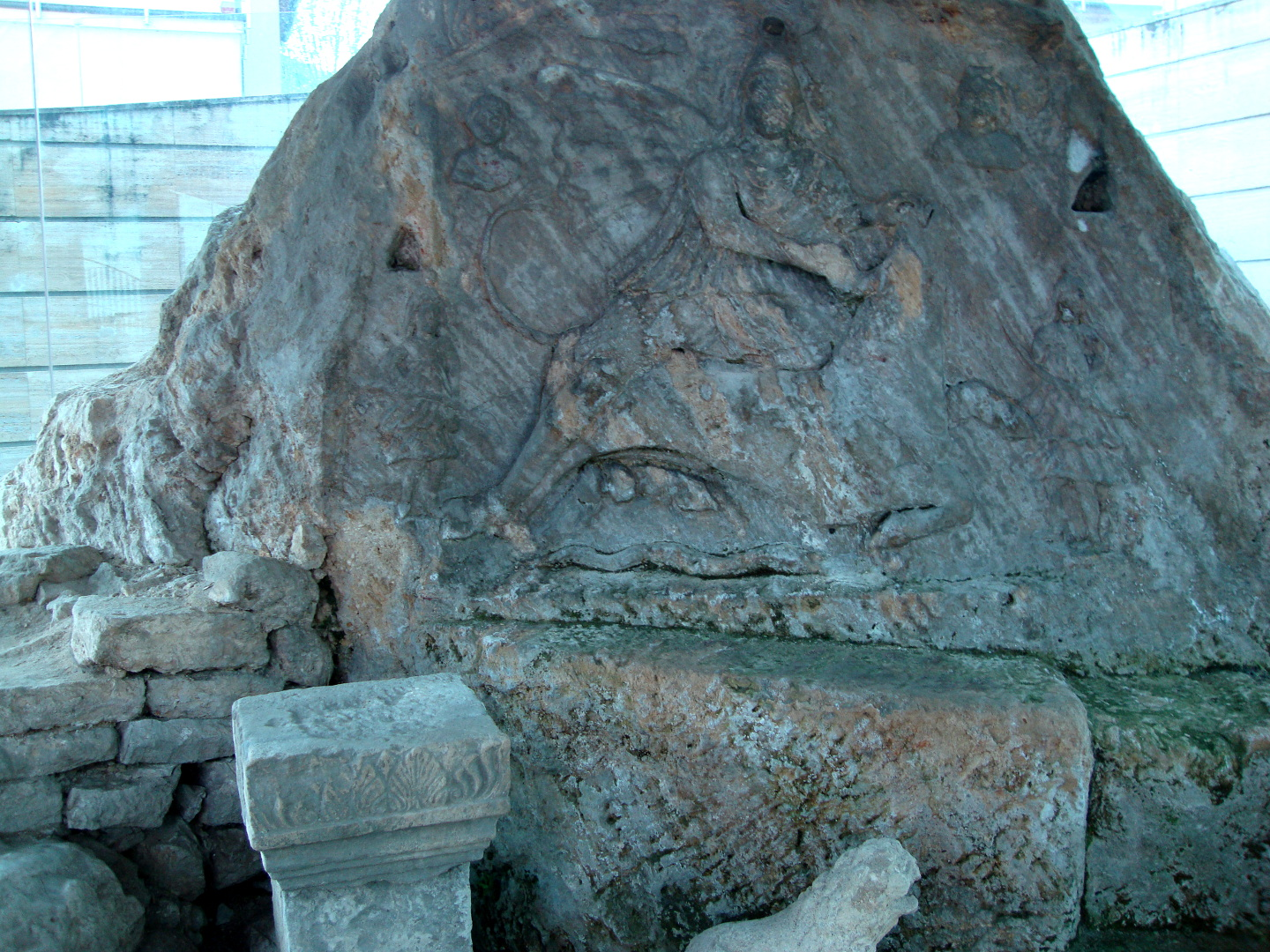
- The Mithraeum in Jajce on 16 July 2017

- Location of Jajce in Bosnia and Herzegovina, where the temple is found
- /0/properties/fillDoes not match the regex pattern ^#?([0-9a-fA-F]{3}){1,2}$; /0/geometriesThe property geometries is required; /0/typeDoes not have a value in the enumeration ["GeometryCollection"]; /0/typeDoes not have a value in the enumeration ["MultiPolygon"]; /0/typeDoes not have a value in the enumeration ["Point"]; /0/typeDoes not have a value in the enumeration ["MultiPoint"]; /0/typeDoes not have a value in the enumeration ["LineString"]; /0/typeDoes not have a value in the enumeration ["MultiLineString"]; /0/typeDoes not have a value in the enumeration ["Polygon"]; /0/coordinatesThe property coordinates is required; /0Failed to match exactly one schema; /0/geometryThe property geometry is required; /0/typeDoes not have a value in the enumeration ["Feature"]; /0/featuresThe property features is required; /0/typeDoes not have a value in the enumeration ["FeatureCollection"]; Interactive map of Jajce Mithraeum
- 44.3407623°N 17.2660339°E
- Type: Temple, sanctuary
- Periods: Roman Imperial
- Location: Mitrasova, Jajce 70101, 87R8+8C Jajce
- Region: Central Bosnia Canton

History
- Built: early 4th century AD
- Abandoned: Not known

Site notes
- Height: floor level is 2.80 metres (9.2 ft) below ground level
- Length: around 7 metres (23 ft)
- Width: less than 7 metres (23 ft)
- Excavation dates: 1931
- Archaeologists: Dimitrije Sergejevski
- Owner: Public
- Public access: Limited

The Jajce Mithraeum, or Jajački Mithraeum (Serbo-Croatian: Jajački mitrej) is a mithraeum, or temple of Mithraism. It was rediscovered in an archaeological dig in 1931 in Jajce, Bosnia and Herzegovina.

== History ==
Mithra was worshipped throughout the Roman era, from the late Republic to the later Imperial era. The cult of Mithraism spread from the Middle East to other parts of the Roman Empire throughout the Mediterranean basin, at first by military-political adventurers, travelers, slaves and merchants from the Orient. Later, Mithraism was spread by soldiers whose legions came into contact with the followers of the cult in the East.

The temple dates back to the early 4th century, although it could be as ancient as the 2nd century with repairs undertaken during the early 4th century.

This particular Mithraeum is one of the best-preserved sites in Europe.

The Jajce site is a typical spelaea. Mithraism followers typically sought to set up their places of worship in caves. In the absence of such topographical features, they excavated the soil and built the small single-celled temple (spelaea) to reinforce the impression of a cave.

== Discovery and protection ==
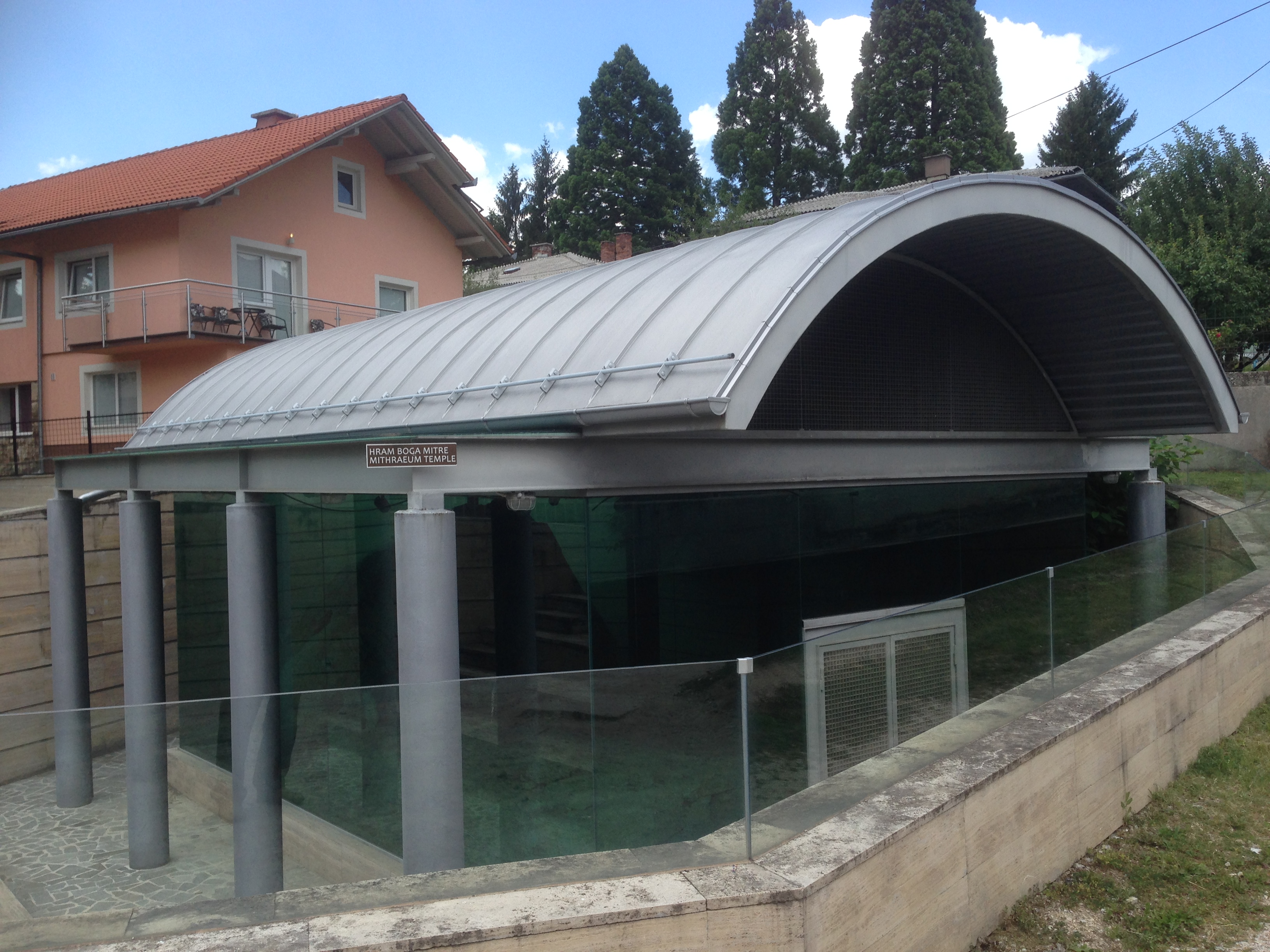
New protection facility is erected in 2012

The remains of the Mithraeum in Jajce were discovered accidentally during excavation for the construction of a private house in 1931.

The site was purchased by the Society for the Preservation of Antiquities in Jajce and soon after a protective stone and mortar structure was constructed under the supervision of engineer F. Steiner. This structure was repaired in 1952 and survived until 2012 despite significant damage suffered during the Bosnian War.

A new facility replaced the previous one following the 2012 renovation, which cost approximately 260,000 KM (BAM) and was carried out under the MDG-F program "Promotion cultural understanding in Bosnia and Herzegovina" with the financial support of the Kingdom of Spain government.

The temple is now protected by a modern glass-walled steel-and-girder cage that allows visitors to see inside without entering. Visitors can enter with advance notice by contacting the Ethnological Museum of Jajce.

The Jajce Mithraeum is declared a National Monument of Bosnia and Herzegovina, and, including the old Jajce walled city core, the waterfall and other individual sites outside of the old city perimeter, as part of wider areal designated as The natural and architectural ensemble of Jajce, proposed as a UNESCO World Heritage Site list. The natural and architectural ensemble of Jajce is currently placed on the UNESCO Tentative list.

== See also ==
- List of National Monuments of Bosnia and Herzegovina
- Walled city of Jajce
- Konjic Mithraeum
- Golubić Mithraeum
