= Dissolution of Austria-Hungary =

Historical event in 1918

Austria–Hungary
Kingdoms and countries of Austria–Hungary:
Cisleithania (Empire of Austria): 1. Bohemia, 2. Bukovina, 3. Carinthia, 4. Carniola, 5. Dalmatia, 6. Galicia, 7. Küstenland, 8. Lower Austria, 9. Moravia, 10. Salzburg, 11. Silesia, 12. Styria, 13. Tyrol, 14. Upper Austria, 15. Vorarlberg;
Transleithania (Kingdom of Hungary): 16. Hungary proper 17. Croatia-Slavonia;
Joint control by Austria and Hungary: 18. Bosnia and Herzegovina (Austro-Hungarian condominium)

The dissolution of Austria-Hungary was a major political event that occurred as a result of the growth of internal social contradictions and the separation of different parts of Austria-Hungary. The more immediate reasons for the collapse of the state were World War I, the worsening food crisis since late 1917, general starvation in Cisleithania during the winter of 1917–1918, the demands of Austria-Hungary's military alliance with the German Empire and its de facto subservience to the German High Command, and its conclusion of the Bread Peace of 9 February 1918 with Ukraine, resulting in uncontrollable civil unrest and nationalist secessionism. The Austro-Hungarian Empire had additionally been weakened over time by a widening gap between Hungarian and Austrian interests. Furthermore, a history of chronic overcommitment rooted in the 1815 Congress of Vienna in which Metternich pledged Austria to fulfill a role that necessitated unwavering Austrian strength and resulted in overextension. Upon this weakened foundation, additional stressors during World War I catalyzed the collapse of the empire. The 1917 October Revolution and the Wilsonian peace pronouncements from January 1918 onward encouraged socialism on the one hand, and nationalism on the other, or alternatively a combination of both tendencies, among all peoples of the Habsburg monarchy.

The remaining territories inhabited by divided peoples fell into the composition of existing or newly formed states. Legally, the collapse of the empire was formalized in the September 1919 Treaty of Saint-Germain-en-Laye with Austria, which also acted as a peace treaty after the First World War, and in the June 1920 Treaty of Trianon with Hungary. Later, additional territories were ceded to other countries.

== Process ==
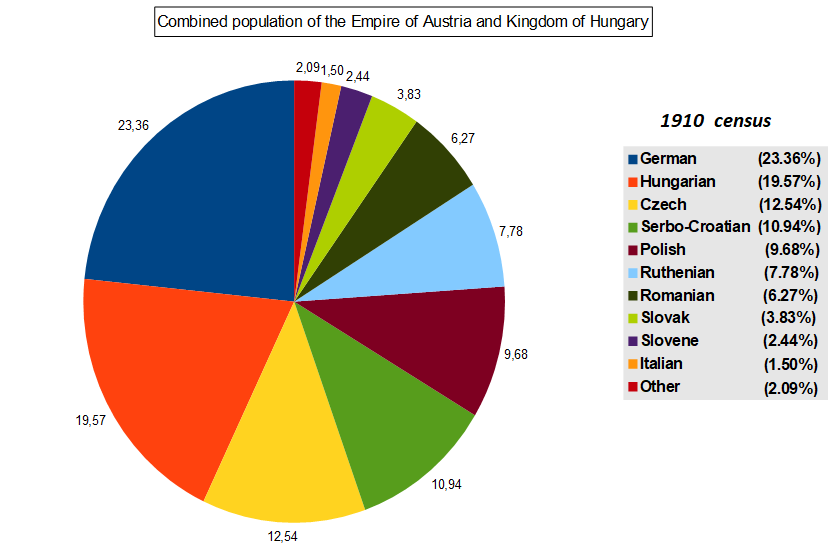
Combined demographics of the Empire of Austria and Kingdom of Hungary (1910)

=== Downfall ===
By 1918, the economic situation had deteriorated. The government had failed badly on the homefront. Historian Alexander Watson reports:

across central Europe ... The majority lived in a state of advanced misery by the spring of 1918, and conditions later worsened, for the summer of 1918 saw both the drop in food supplied to the levels of the 'turnip winter', and the onset of the 1918 flu pandemic that killed at least 20 million worldwide. Society was relieved, exhausted and yearned for peace.

As the Imperial economy collapsed into severe hardship and even starvation, its multi-ethnic army lost its morale and was increasingly hard-pressed to hold its line. Furthermore, nationalists within the empire were becoming increasingly embittered as, under expanded wartime powers, the military routinely suspended civil rights and treated different national groups with varying degrees of contempt throughout the Austrian half of the Dual Monarchy. At the last Italian offensive, the Austro-Hungarian Army took to the field without any food and munition supply and fought without any political supports for a de facto non-existent empire.

The Austro-Hungarian monarchy collapsed with dramatic speed in the autumn of 1918. Leftist and pacifist political movements organized strikes in factories, and uprisings in the army had become commonplace. These leftist or left-liberal pro-Entente maverick parties opposed the monarchy as a form of government and considered themselves internationalist rather than patriotic. Eventually, the German defeat and the minor revolutions in Vienna and Budapest gave political power to the left/liberal political parties.

=== Disintegration ===
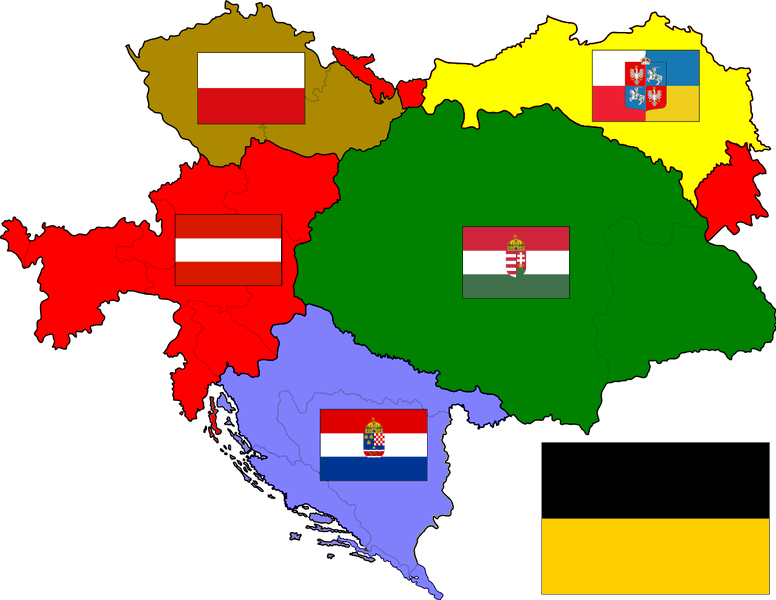
Karl I of Austria proposed a Habsburg Empire of Five Kingdoms as a last desperate attempt to save the Monarchy.

As the war went on the ethnic unity declined; the Allies encouraged breakaway demands from minorities and the Empire faced disintegration. As it became apparent that the Allied powers would win World War I, nationalist movements, which had previously been calling for a greater degree of autonomy for various areas, started pressing for full independence. In the capital cities of Vienna and Budapest, the leftist and liberal movements and opposition parties strengthened and supported the separatism of ethnic minorities. The multiethnic Austro-Hungarian Empire started to disintegrate, leaving its army alone on the battlefields. The military breakdown of the Italian front marked the start of the rebellion for the numerous ethnicities who made up the multiethnic Empire, as they refused to keep on fighting for a cause that now appeared senseless. The Emperor had lost much of his power to rule, as his realm disintegrated.

As one of his Fourteen Points, President Woodrow Wilson demanded that the nationalities of Austria–Hungary have the "freest opportunity to autonomous development". In response, Emperor Karl I agreed to reconvene the Imperial Parliament in 1917 and allow the creation of a confederation with each national group exercising self-governance. However, the leaders of these national groups rejected the idea; they deeply distrusted Vienna and were now determined to get independence.

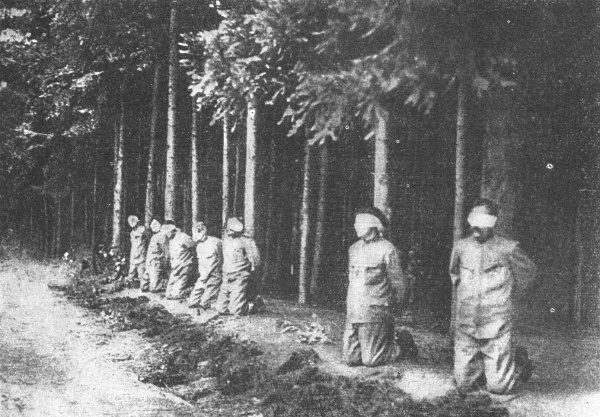
The revolt of ethnic Czech units in Austria in May 1918 was brutally suppressed. It was considered a mutiny by the code of military justice.

On 14 October 1918, Foreign Minister Baron István Burián von Rajecz asked for an armistice based on the Fourteen Points.

On 16 October 1918, Emperor Karl I of Austria and IV of Hungary proclaimed the People's Manifesto, which envisaged to turn the Empire into a federal state of five Kingdoms (Austria, Hungary, Croatia, Bohemia and Polish-Galicia), in an attempt to take into account the aspirations of the Croats, Czechs, Austrian Germans, Poles, Ukrainians and Romanians without affecting the integrity of the lands of the Crown of Saint Stephen. It also promised the unification of Polish lands via an Austro-Polish solution, and an Austro-Bohemian Compromise that would transform the projected Trialism into a proposal with two additional kingdoms. The city of Trieste and its Italian territory would be granted a special status. Karl declared that his objectives were to resolve 'the needs of the Austrian people' and bring 'happiness to all [his] people' (including non-Germans), and that he had thrived to achieve peace in the 'fatherland' and to rebuild society ever since his accession to the throne. However, the People's Manifesto came too late, at a time when Austria-Hungary was collapsing near the end of the war, and was no longer perceived by the national representative bodies as an invitation to reform the monarchy but as an opportunity to carve out their own future in a self-determined way with the option of leaving the monarchy.

Four days later, on 18 October, United States Secretary of State Robert Lansing replied that the Allies were now committed to the causes of the Czechs, Slovaks and South Slavs. Therefore, Lansing said, autonomy for the nationalities – the tenth of the Fourteen Points – was no longer enough and Washington could not deal on the basis of the Fourteen Points anymore. The Lansing note was, in effect, the death certificate of Austria–Hungary. In fact, a Czechoslovak provisional government had joined the Allies on 14 October. The South Slavs in both halves of the monarchy had already declared in favor of uniting with Serbia in a large South Slav state by way of the 1917 Corfu Declaration signed by members of the Yugoslav Committee. Indeed, the Croatians had begun disregarding orders from Budapest earlier in October.

The national councils had already begun acting more or less as provisional governments of independent countries. During the Italian battles, the political leaders of Czechs, Slovaks and Southern Slavs declared their independence. With defeat in the war imminent after the Bulgarian Armistice which left the south of the Empire wide open to the advance of the Entente Army of the Orient and the subsequent Italian victory in the Battle of Vittorio Veneto beginning on 24 October, Czech politicians peacefully took over command in Prague on 28 October (later declared the birthday of Czechoslovakia) and followed up in other major cities in the next few days. On 30 October, the Slovaks followed in Martin. On 29 October, the Slavs in both portions of what remained of Austria–Hungary proclaimed the State of Slovenes, Croats and Serbs. They also declared that their ultimate intention was to unite with Serbia and Montenegro in a large South Slav state. On the same day, the Czechs and Slovaks formally proclaimed the establishment of Czechoslovakia as an independent state.

=== Dissolution ===
Alexander Watson argues that, "The Habsburg regime's doom was sealed when Wilson's response to the note, sent two and a half weeks earlier [by the foreign minister Baron István Burián von Rajecz on 14 October 1918], arrived on 20 October." Wilson rejected the continuation of the dual monarchy as a negotiable possibility.

On 17 October 1918, the Hungarian Parliament voted to terminate the real union with Austria that formed the basis for the dual monarchy. The most prominent opponent of continued union with Austria, the pro-Entente pacifist Count Mihály Károlyi, seized power in the Aster Revolution on 31 October. Karl I was all but forced to appoint Károlyi as his Hungarian prime minister. One of Károlyi's first acts was to repudiate the compromise agreement on 31 October, thus officially dissolving the Austro-Hungarian monarchy and state.

On the 1st of November, Károlyi's new Hungarian government decided to recall all of the troops who were conscripted from the territory of Kingdom of Hungary, which was a major blow for the Habsburg's armies on the front lines.

By the end of October, there was nothing left of the Habsburg realm but its majority-German Danubian and Alpine provinces, and Karl I's authority was being challenged even there by the German-Austrian state council. Karl I's last Austrian prime minister, Heinrich Lammasch, concluded that Karl I was in an impossible situation, and persuaded Karl I that the best course was to relinquish, at least temporarily, his right to exercise sovereign authority.

On 11 November, Karl I issued a carefully worded proclamation in which he recognized the Austrian people's right to determine the form of the state. He also renounced the right to participate in Austrian affairs of state. He also dismissed Lammasch and his government from office and released the officials in the Austrian half of the empire from their oath of loyalty to him. Two days later, he issued a similar proclamation for Hungary. However, he did not abdicate, remaining available in the event the people of either state should recall him. For all intents and purposes, this was the end of Habsburg rule.

Karl I's proclamation

Since my ascent to the throne, I have been constantly trying to lead my people out of the horrors of war, which I am not responsible for.

I have not hesitated to restore constitutional life and have opened the way for peoples to develop their own state independently.

Still filled with unchangeable love for all My peoples, I do not want to oppose the free development of My Person as an obstacle.

I recognize in advance the decision that German Austria will make regarding its future form of government.

The people took over the government through their representatives. I waive any share in state affairs.

At the same time, I am releasing My Austrian Government from office.

May the people of German Austria create and consolidate the reorganization in harmony and forgiveness. The happiness of my peoples has been the goal of my hottest wishes from the beginning.

Only inner peace can heal the wounds of this war.

Seit meiner Thronbesteigung war ich unablässig bemüht, Meine Volker aus den Schrecknissen des Krieges herauszuführen, an dessen Ausbruch ich keinerlei Schuld trage.

Ich habe nicht gezögert, das verfassungsmäßige Leben wieder herzustellen und haben den Völkern den Weg zu ihrer selbständigen staatlichen Entwicklung eröffnet.

Nach wie vor von unwandelbarer Liebe für alle Meine Völker erfüllt, will ich ihrer freien Entfaltung Meine Person nicht als Hindernis entgegenstellen.

Im voraus erkenne ich die Entscheidung an, die Deutschösterreich über seine künftige Staatsform trifft.

Das Volk hat durch seine Vertreter die Regierung übernommen. Ich verzichte auf jeden Anteil an den Staatsgeschäften.

Gleichzeitig enthebe ich Meine österreichische Regierung ihres Amtes.

Möge das Volk von Deutschösterreich in Eintracht und Versöhnlichkeit die Neuordnung schaffen und befestigen. Das Glück Meiner Völker war von Anbeginn das Ziel Meiner heißesten Wünsche.

Nur der innere Friede kann die Wunden dieses Krieges heilen.

Karl I's refusal to abdicate was ultimately irrelevant. On the day after he announced his withdrawal from Austria's politics, the German-Austrian National Council proclaimed the Republic of German Austria. Károlyi followed suit on 16 November, proclaiming the Hungarian Democratic Republic.

Following the restoration of the monarchy in Hungary, Karl (Charles IV of Hungary) attempted to reclaim his throne in Budapest, but these attempts failed and he was exiled.

On September 10, 1919, the Treaty of Saint-Germain recognized both the dissolution of Austria-Hungary and the independence of the Hungarian state, although Hungary was in a state of anarchy during that period.

== Aftermath ==
=== Successor states ===
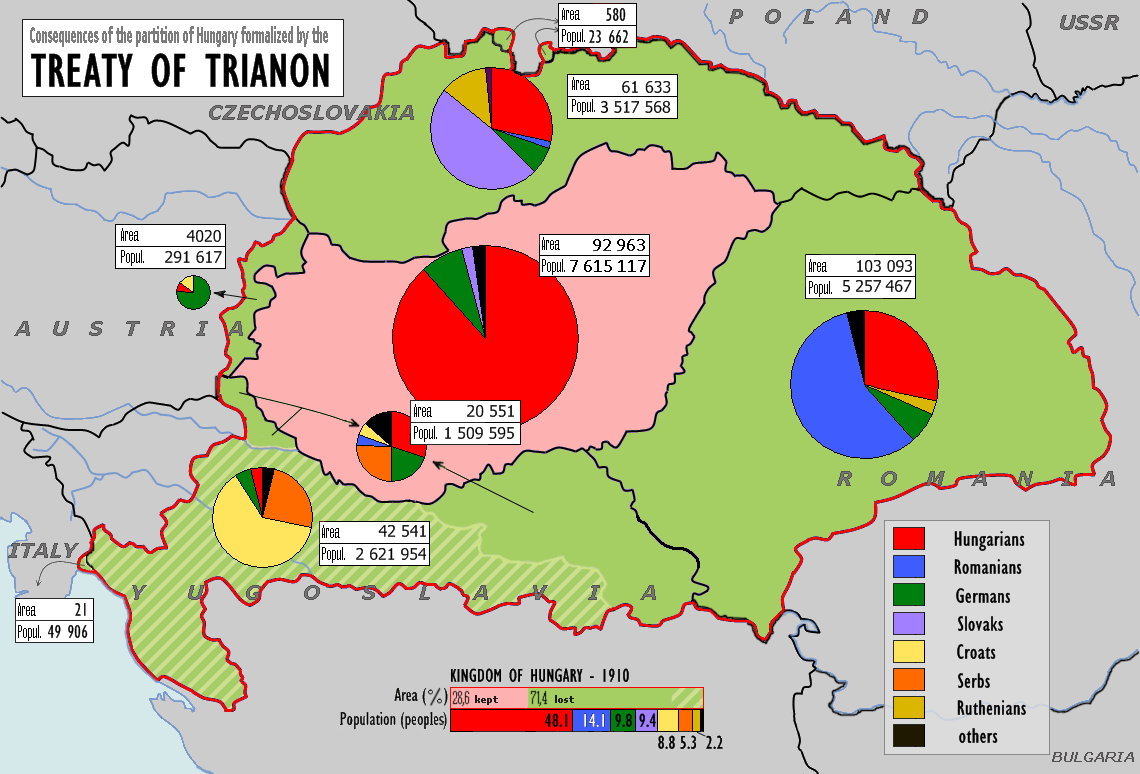
The Treaty of Trianon: Kingdom of Hungary lost 72% of its land and 3.3 million people of Hungarian ethnicity.

There were two legal successor states of the former Austro–Hungarian monarchy:

- German Austria (which became the First Austrian Republic)
- Hungarian (People's) Republic (which after a few other short-lived intermediaries became the Kingdom of Hungary)

The Treaty of Saint-Germain-en-Laye (between the victors of World War I and Austria) and the Treaty of Trianon (between the victors and Hungary) regulated the new borders of Austria and Hungary, reducing them to small-sized and landlocked states. In regard to areas without a decisive national majority, the Entente powers ruled in many cases in favour of the newly-emancipated independent nation-states, enabling them to claim vast territories containing sizeable German- and Hungarian-speaking populations.

The decisions contained in the treaties had immense political and economic effects. The previously rapid economic growth of the imperial territories initially stalled because the new borders became major economic barriers. Many established industries and infrastructure elements were intended to satisfy the needs of an extensive realm. As a result, the emerging countries were often compelled to considerable sacrifices in order to transform their economies. A major political unease in the affected regions followed as a result of these economic difficulties, fueling in some cases extremist movements.

==== Austria ====
As a result, the Republic of Austria lost roughly 60% of the old Austrian Empire's territory. It also had to drop its plans for union with Germany, as it was not allowed to unite with Germany without League approval.

The new Austrian state was, at least on paper, on shakier ground than Hungary. Unlike its former Hungarian partner, Austria had never been a nation in any real sense. While the Austrian state had existed in one form or another for 700 years, it was united only by loyalty to the Habsburgs. Vienna was now a lavish and oversized imperial capital lacking an empire to support it, thus being sarcastically referred to as the “national hydrocephalus”.

However, after a brief period of upheaval and the Allies' refusal to consider a union with Germany, Austria established itself as a federal republic. Despite the temporary Anschluss with Nazi Germany, Austria never permanently unified with Germany.

==== Hungary ====
By comparison, Hungary had been a nation and a state for over 900 years. Hungary, however, was severely disrupted by the loss of 72% of its territory, 64% of its population and most of its natural resources. The First Hungarian Republic was short-lived and was temporarily replaced by the communist Hungarian Soviet Republic. Romanian troops ousted Béla Kun and his communist government during the Hungarian–Romanian War of 1919.

In the summer of 1919, Karl's cousin, Archduke Joseph August, became regent, but was forced to stand down after only two weeks when it became apparent the Allies would not recognise him or any other Habsburg as head of state. Finally, in March 1920, royal powers were entrusted to a regent, Miklós Horthy, who had been the last commanding admiral of the Austro-Hungarian Navy and had helped organize the counter-revolutionary forces. It was this government that signed the Treaty of Trianon under protest on 4 June 1920 at the Grand Trianon Palace in Versailles, France.

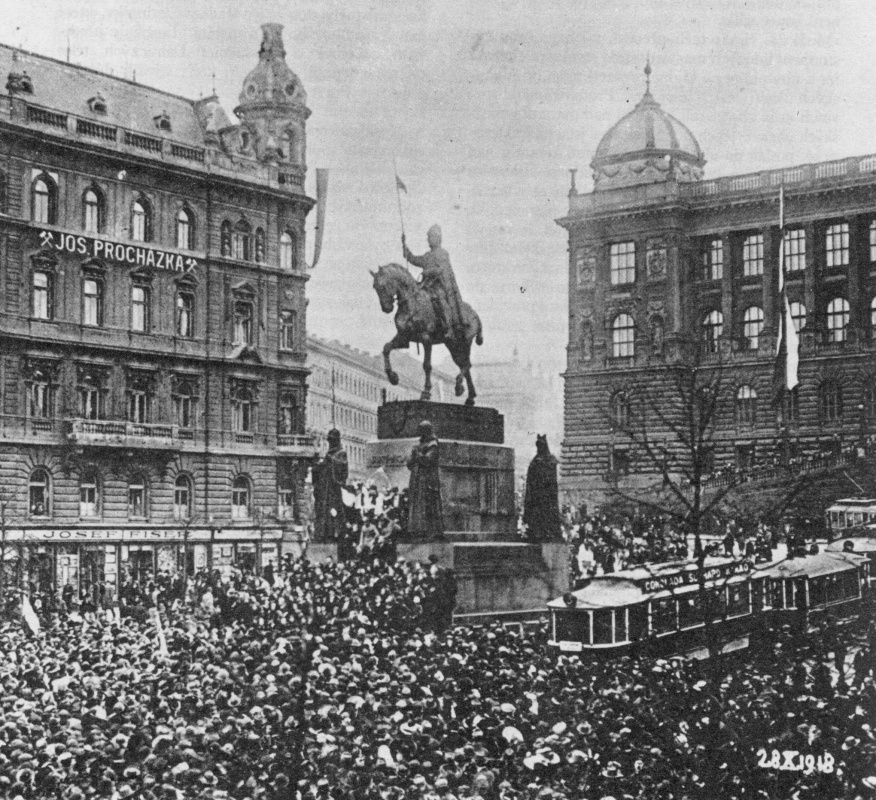
Czechoslovak declaration of independence rally in Prague on Wenceslas Square, 28 October 1918

=== Habsburg banishment ===
Austria had passed the "Habsburg Law," which both dethroned the Habsburgs and banished all Habsburgs from Austrian territory. While Karl I was banned from ever returning to Austria again, other Habsburgs could return if they gave up all claims to the defunct throne.

In March and again in October 1921, ill-prepared attempts by Karl I to regain the throne in Budapest collapsed. The initially wavering Horthy, after receiving threats of intervention from the Allied Powers and the Little Entente, refused his cooperation. Soon afterward, the Hungarian government nullified the Pragmatic Sanction, effectively dethroning the Habsburgs. Subsequently, the British took custody of Karl I and removed him and his family to the Portuguese island of Madeira, where he died the following year.

=== Territorial legacy ===
==== Immediate aftermath of World War I ====
The following states were formed, re-established or expanded at the dissolution of the former Austro–Hungarian monarchy:

- German Austria (which became the First Austrian Republic)
- First Hungarian Republic which became the Hungarian Soviet Republic, subsequently briefly restored and replaced by the Hungarian Republic, ultimately transformed into the Kingdom of Hungary
- First Czechoslovak Republic ("Czechoslovakia" from 1920 to 1938)
- Second Polish Republic, contested by the short-lived proto-states of Tarnobrzeg Republic and Polish Soviet Socialist Republic
- State of Slovenes, Croats and Serbs and the Kingdom of Serbia, both later absorbed into the Kingdom of Serbs, Croats and Slovenes
- Greater Romania
- Kingdom of Italy
- Republic of China (former Austro-Hungarian concession of Tianjin)
- the short-lived Ruthenian (Ukrainian and Rusyn) proto-states of West Ukrainian People's Republic (later absorbed into Ukrainian People's Republic), Hutsul Republic, Lemko Republic, Komancza Republic and the Galician Soviet Socialist Republic; all were ultimately absorbed mostly into Poland, but also into Hungary, Czechoslovakia, Romania and Yugoslavia.

The Principality of Liechtenstein, which had formerly looked to Vienna for protection and whose ruling house held sizable real estate in Cisleithania, formed a customs and defense union with Switzerland, and adopted the Swiss currency instead of the Austrian. In April 1919, Vorarlberg – the westernmost province of Austria – voted by a large majority to join Switzerland; however, both the Swiss and the Allies disregarded this result.

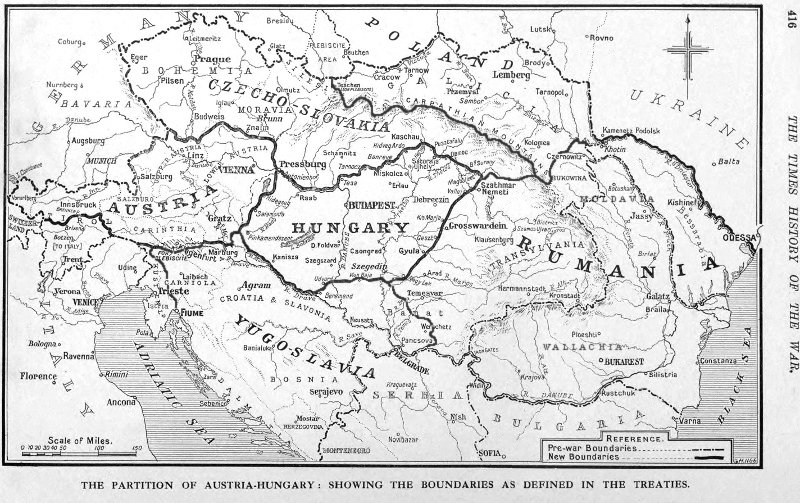
New hand-drawn borders of Austria–Hungary in the Treaty of Trianon and Saint Germain (1919–1920, with a mistake: Transcarpathia was not attached to Poland but to Czechoslovakia).

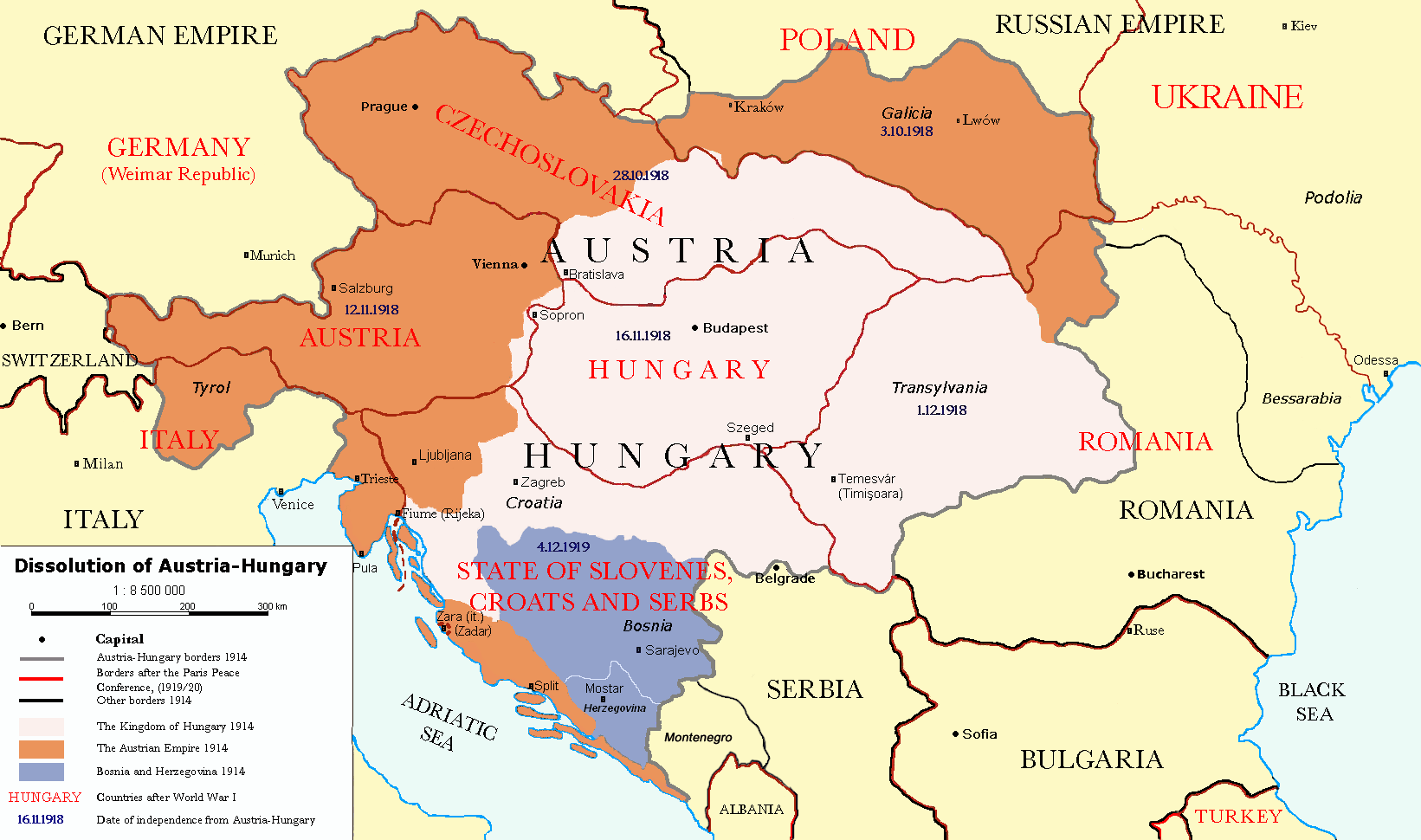
New borders of Austria–Hungary after the Treaty of Trianon and Saint Germain Border of Austria–Hungary in 1914 Borders in 1914 Borders in 1920 Empire of Austria in 1914 Kingdom of Hungary in 1914 Bosnia and Herzegovina in 1914

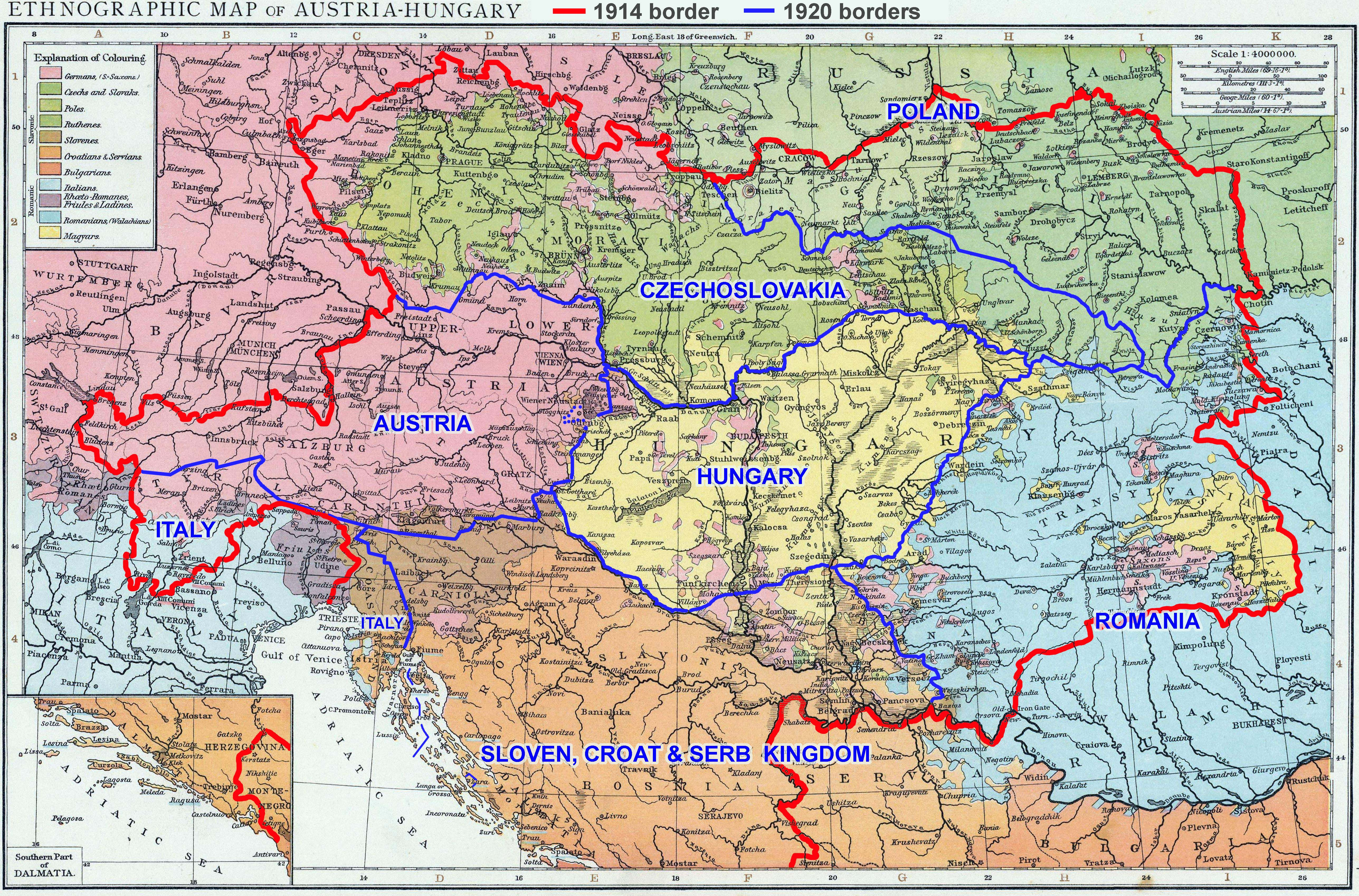
Post-WWI borders on an ethnic map

Successor states as of 1930: tabular summary:

state	sq. km (ths)	% of Austria-Hungary	% of Austria	% of Hungary	% of Bosnia-Herzegovina	% of total taken over from Austria-Hungary
Austria	83.8	12.4	26.5	1.3	0	100
Czechoslovakia	140.5	20.7	26.0	18.5	0	99.8
Hungary	93.0	13.8	0	29.0	0	100
Italy	23.4	3.3	8.0	0	0	7.0
Poland	80.1	12.0	27.0	0.2	0	21.0
Romania	113.2	16.7	3.5	31.5	0	38.3
Yugoslavia	143.5	21.1	9.0	19.5	100	57.6

==== Present ====
The following present-day countries and parts of countries were within the boundaries of Austria–Hungary when the empire was dissolved. Some other provinces of Europe had been part of the Habsburg monarchy at one time before 1867. Prominent examples are the regions of Lombardy and Veneto in Italy, Silesia in Poland, most of Belgium and Serbia, and parts of northern Switzerland and southwestern Germany.

Empire of Austria (Cisleithania):

- Austria (except Burgenland without Sopron)
- Czech Republic (except the Hlučínsko area)
- Slovenia (except Prekmurje)
- Italy (Trentino, South Tyrol, parts of the province of Belluno and small portions of Friuli-Venezia Giulia)
- Croatia (Dalmatia, Istria)
- Poland (voivodeships of Lesser Poland, Subcarpathia, southernmost part of Silesia (Bielsko and Cieszyn)
- Ukraine (oblasts of Lviv, Ivano-Frankivsk, Ternopil (except the Kremenets Raion and most of the oblast of Chernivtsi)
- Romania (county of Suceava)
- Montenegro (bay of Boka Kotorska, the coast and the immediate hinterland around the cities of Budva, Petrovac and Sutomore)

Kingdom of Hungary (Transleithania):

- Hungary
- Slovakia
- Austria (Burgenland except Sopron)
- Slovenia (Prekmurje)
- Croatia (Croatian Baranja and Međimurje county, Fiume as corpus separatum along with Slavonia and Central Croatia were not part of Hungary proper, the latter two were part of the sovereign Kingdom of Croatia-Slavonia)
- Ukraine (oblast of Zakarpattia)
- Romania (region of Transylvania, Partium and parts of Banat, Crișana, and Maramureș)
- Serbia (autonomous province of Vojvodina and northern Belgrade region)
- Poland (Polish parts of Orava and Spiš)

Austro-Hungarian Condominium

- Bosnia and Herzegovina (the villages of Zavalje, Mali Skočaj and Veliki Skočaj including the immediate surrounding area west of the city of Bihać)
- Montenegro (Sutorina – western part of the Municipality of Herceg Novi between present borders with Croatia (SW) and Bosnia and Herzegovina (NW), Adriatic coast (E) and the township of Igalo (NE))
- Sandžak-Raška region, Austro-Hungarian occupied 1878 until withdrawal in 1908 whilst formally part of the Ottoman Empire
- The Empire treated Bosnia-Herzegovina in much the same way the other powers treated their overseas colonies

Other possessions of the Austro-Hungarian Monarchy

- People's Republic of China (part of Hebei District, Tianjin)

== See also ==
- Congress of Oppressed Nationalities of the Austro-Hungarian Empire
