= Captain's Tower (Bihać) =

Coordinates: 44°48′51″N 15°52′13″E

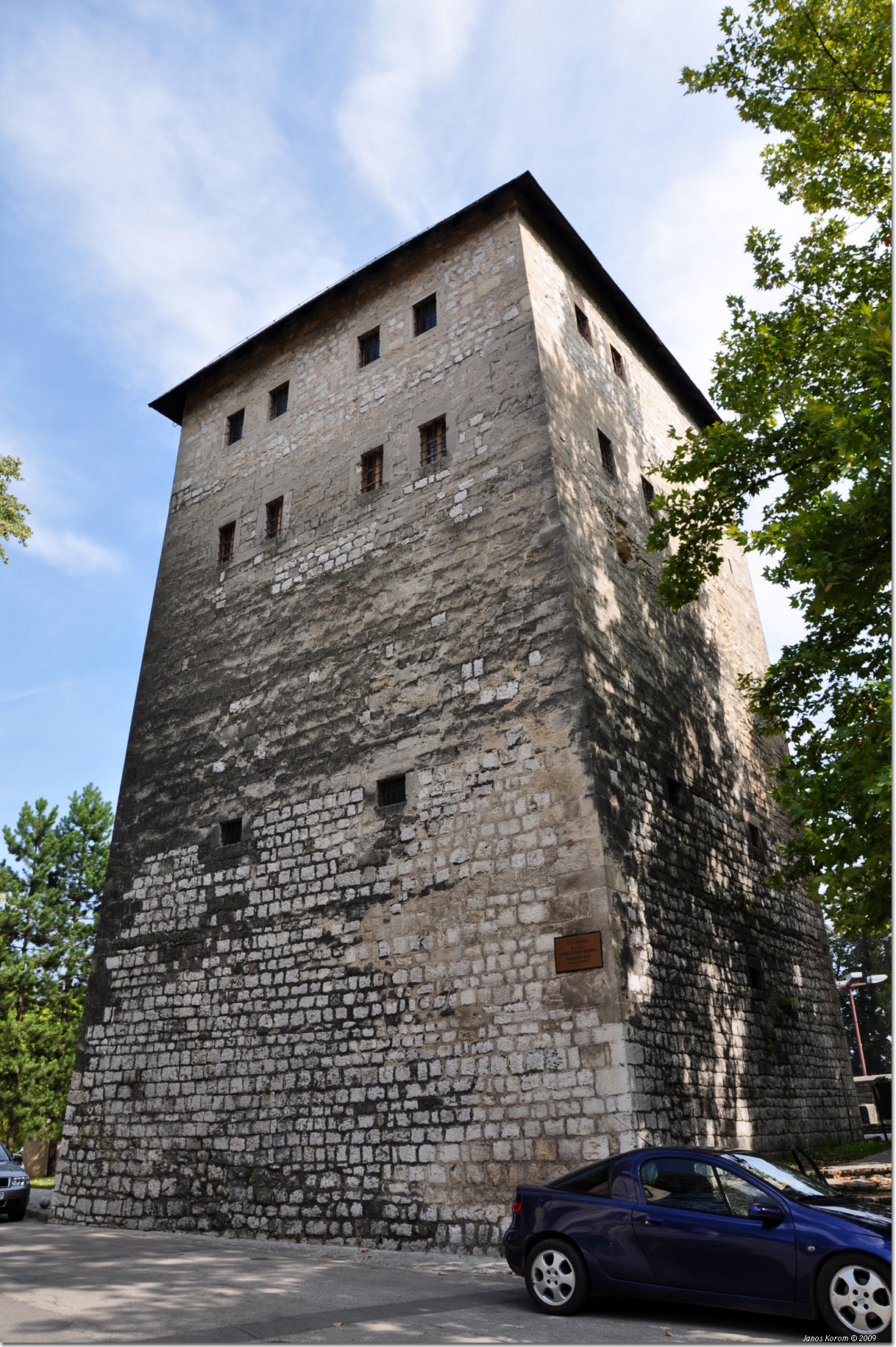
Captain's Tower

The Captain's Tower (Bosnian: Kapetanova kula) is part of a former fortress in Bihać, Bosnia and Herzegovina. It has been designated a National Monument of Bosnia and Herzegovina since 2007.

The tower is located in the lower part of the city, on the left bank of the Una river. What distinguishes the Bihać fortress from other fortified towns in Bosnia and Herzegovina during the Ottoman period is the preserved urban layout within the city walls.

== History ==
The exact date of the construction of Captain's Tower and the former fortress is unknown. Based on historical maps of the town and its surroundings, it is believed that the tower had already been built before 1697. According to some historians, the tower was constructed around 1205 and was one of the four defensive towers of medieval Bihać. Local tradition also holds that King Béla IV of Hungary stayed in the tower while fleeing the Mongol invasion.

The Ottoman army captured Bihać in June 1592. During the following three centuries, the town became one of the westernmost strongholds of the Ottoman Empire and served as an important military base for campaigns and continuous pressure along the Croatian border. According to an anonymous report from 1785, the Bihać fortress was equipped with 28 large cannons and garrisoned by approximately 700 soldiers. The last "captain" (dizdar) living in the tower was Muharem-aga Delić in the latter half of the 19th century.

After the Austro-Hungarian occupation, Captain's Tower was used exclusively as a prison. Much of the fortress was demolished between 1890 and 1891. During this period, several structural alterations were carried out that significantly demolished the original fortress, leaving only the tower. The tower alone continued to serve as the District Prison until 1959, becaming the Museum of the Una-Sana Canton following the end of the Bosnian War in 1995.

== Description ==
Captain's Tower is a square-plan defensive structure topped with a steep hipped roof. It forms part of the historic complex of the Old Town of Bihać, together with the remains of the fortification walls on its southern and eastern sides, the remains of the old water canal, the demolished Church of Saint Anthony of Padua, the Turbe Mausoleum, and the remains of the former Konak (Ottoman governor's residence).
