= Vrsta =

Vrsta Врста
- Village
- Location within Bosnia and Herzegovina
- Coordinates: 44°53′45″N 15°49′48″E
- Country: Bosnia and Herzegovina
- Entity: Federation of Bosnia and Herzegovina
- Canton: Una-Sana
- Municipality: Bihać

Area
  - Total: 1.29 sq mi (3.35 km^{2})

Population (2013)
  - Total: 458
  - Density: 354/sq mi (137/km^{2})
- Time zone: UTC+1 (CET)
  - Summer (DST): UTC+2 (CEST)

Vrsta (Serbian Cyrillic: Врста) is a village in the municipality of Bihać, Bosnia and Herzegovina.

== Demographics ==
According to the 2013 census, its population was 458.

Ethnicity in 2013
Ethnicity	Number	Percentage
Bosniaks	451	98.5%
other/undeclared	7	1.5%
Total	458	100%
