= Spahići, Bosnia and Herzegovina =

Spahići Спахићи
- Village
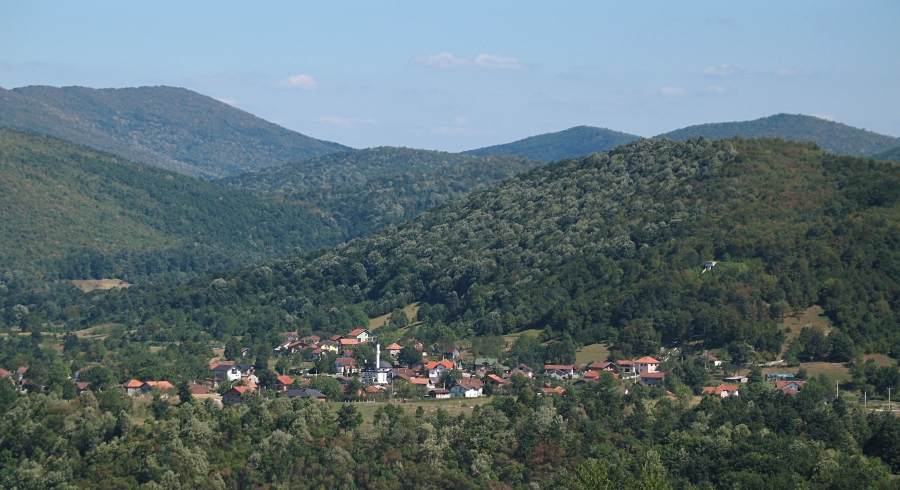
- An overhead view of the village Spahići, which is surrounded by green hills.

- Location within Bosnia and Herzegovina
- Coordinates: 44°52′45″N 15°54′30″E
- Country: Bosnia and Herzegovina
- Entity: Federation of Bosnia and Herzegovina
- Canton: Una-Sana
- Municipality: Bihać

Area
  - Total: 3.41 sq mi (8.83 km^{2})

Population (2013)
  - Total: 450
  - Density: 130/sq mi (51/km^{2})
- Time zone: UTC+1 (CET)
  - Summer (DST): UTC+2 (CEST)

Spahići (Serbian Cyrillic: Спахићи) is a village in the municipality of Bihać, Bosnia and Herzegovina.

== Demographics ==
According to the 2013 census, its population was 450.

Ethnicity in 2013
Ethnicity	Number	Percentage
Bosniaks	442	98.2%
Croats	1	0.2%
other/undeclared	7	1.6%
Total	450	100%
