= Grmuša =

Grmuša Грмуша
- Village
- Location within Bosnia and Herzegovina
- Coordinates: 44°53′33″N 16°04′50″E
- Country: Bosnia and Herzegovina
- Entity: Federation of Bosnia and Herzegovina
- Canton: Una-Sana
- Municipality: Bihać

Area
  - Total: 11.88 sq mi (30.78 km^{2})

Population (2013)
  - Total: 0
  - Density: 0.0/sq mi (0.0/km^{2})
- Time zone: UTC+1 (CET)
  - Summer (DST): UTC+2 (CEST)

Grmuša (Serbian Cyrillic: Грмуша) is a village in the municipality of Bihać, Bosnia and Herzegovina.

== Demographics ==
According to the 2013 census, its population was nil, down from 304 in 1991.
