= Gorjevac =

Gorjevac Горјевац
- Village
- Location within Bosnia and Herzegovina
- Coordinates: 44°45′N 15°59′E
- Country: Bosnia and Herzegovina
- Entity: Federation of Bosnia and Herzegovina
- Canton: Una-Sana
- Municipality: Bihać

Area
  - Total: 12.91 sq mi (33.43 km^{2})

Population (2013)
  - Total: 4
  - Density: 0.31/sq mi (0.12/km^{2})
- Time zone: UTC+1 (CET)
  - Summer (DST): UTC+2 (CEST)

Gorjevac (Serbian Cyrillic: Горјевац) is a village in the municipality of Bihać, Bosnia and Herzegovina.

== Demographics ==
According to the 2013 census, its population was four, all Serbs.
