= Hrgar =

Hrgar Хргар
- Village
- Location within Bosnia and Herzegovina
- Coordinates: 44°46′58″N 15°58′15″E
- Country: Bosnia and Herzegovina
- Entity: Federation of Bosnia and Herzegovina
- Canton: Una-Sana
- Municipality: Bihać

Area
  - Total: 13.52 sq mi (35.02 km^{2})

Population (2013)
  - Total: 0
  - Density: 0.0/sq mi (0.0/km^{2})
- Time zone: UTC+1 (CET)
  - Summer (DST): UTC+2 (CEST)

Hrgar (Serbian Cyrillic: Хргар) is a village in the municipality of Bihać, Bosnia and Herzegovina.

== Demographics ==
According to the 2013 census, its population was 0, down from 81 in 1991.
