= Pritoka =

Pritoka Притока
- Village
- Location within Bosnia and Herzegovina
- Coordinates: 44°47′50″N 15°55′38″E
- Country: Bosnia and Herzegovina
- Entity: Federation of Bosnia and Herzegovina
- Canton: Una-Sana
- Municipality: Bihać

Area
  - Total: 7.49 sq mi (19.41 km^{2})

Population (2013)
  - Total: 683
  - Density: 91.1/sq mi (35.2/km^{2})
- Time zone: UTC+1 (CET)
  - Summer (DST): UTC+2 (CEST)

Pritoka (Serbian Cyrillic: Притока) is a village in the municipality of Bihać, Bosnia and Herzegovina.

== Demographics ==
According to the 2013 census, its population was 683.

Ethnicity in 2013
Ethnicity	Number	Percentage
Bosniaks	612	89.6%
Serbs	25	3.7%
Croats	3	0.4%
other/undeclared	43	6.3%
Total	683	100%
