= Rajinovci =

Rajinovci Рајиновци
- Village
- Location within Bosnia and Herzegovina
- Coordinates: 44°35′32″N 16°05′10″E
- Country: Bosnia and Herzegovina
- Entity: Federation of Bosnia and Herzegovina
- Canton: Una-Sana
- Municipality: Bihać

Area
  - Total: 3.15 sq mi (8.16 km^{2})

Population (2013)
  - Total: 22
  - Density: 7.0/sq mi (2.7/km^{2})
- Time zone: UTC+1 (CET)
  - Summer (DST): UTC+2 (CEST)

Rajinovci (Serbian Cyrillic: Рајиновци) is a village in the municipality of Bihać, Bosnia and Herzegovina.

== Demographics ==
According to the 2013 census, its population was 22.

Ethnicity in 2013
Ethnicity	Number	Percentage
Bosniaks	20	90.9%
other/undeclared	2	9.1%
Total	22	100%
