= Međudražje =

Međudražje Међудражје
- Village
- Location within Bosnia and Herzegovina
- Coordinates: 44°46′N 15°50′E
- Country: Bosnia and Herzegovina
- Entity: Federation of Bosnia and Herzegovina
- Canton: Una-Sana
- Municipality: Bihać

Area
  - Total: 3.54 sq mi (9.18 km^{2})

Population (2013)
  - Total: 35
  - Density: 9.9/sq mi (3.8/km^{2})
- Time zone: UTC+1 (CET)
  - Summer (DST): UTC+2 (CEST)

Međudražje (Serbian Cyrillic: Међудражје) is a village in the municipality of Bihać, Bosnia and Herzegovina.

== Demographics ==
According to the 2013 census, its population was 35.

Ethnicity in 2013
Ethnicity	Number	Percentage
Croats	30	85.7%
Bosniaks	3	8.6%
other/undeclared	2	5.7%
Total	35	100%
