= Praščijak =

Praščijak Прашчијак
- Village
- Location within Bosnia and Herzegovina
- Coordinates: 44°46′N 15°58′E
- Country: Bosnia and Herzegovina
- Entity: Federation of Bosnia and Herzegovina
- Canton: Una-Sana
- Municipality: Bihać

Area
  - Total: 0.95 sq mi (2.47 km^{2})

Population (2013)
  - Total: 15
  - Density: 16/sq mi (6.1/km^{2})
- Time zone: UTC+1 (CET)
  - Summer (DST): UTC+2 (CEST)

Praščijak (Serbian Cyrillic: Прашчијак) is a village in the municipality of Bihać, Bosnia and Herzegovina.

== Demographics ==
According to the 2013 census, its population was 15.

Ethnicity in 2013
| Ethnicity | Number | Percentage |
|---|---|---|
| Bosniaks | 13 | 86.7% |
| Serbs | 2 | 13.3% |
| Total | 15 | 100% |
