= Mala Peća =

Mala Peća Мала Пећ
- Village
- Location within Bosnia and Herzegovina
- Coordinates: 44°55′N 15°47′E
- Country: Bosnia and Herzegovina
- Entity: Federation of Bosnia and Herzegovina
- Canton: Una-Sana
- Municipality: Bihać

Area
  - Total: 1.05 sq mi (2.72 km^{2})

Population (2013)
  - Total: 511
  - Density: 487/sq mi (188/km^{2})
- Time zone: UTC+1 (CET)
  - Summer (DST): UTC+2 (CEST)

Mala Peća (Serbian Cyrillic: Мала Пећа) is a village in the municipality of Bihać, Bosnia and Herzegovina.

== Demographics ==
According to the 2013 census, its population was 511.

Ethnicity in 2013
Ethnicity	Number	Percentage
Bosniaks	501	98.0%
other/undeclared	10	2.0%
Total	511	100%
