= Donja Gata =

Donja Gata Доња Гата
- Village
- Location within Bosnia and Herzegovina
- Coordinates: 44°45′53″N 15°50′01″E
- Country: Bosnia and Herzegovina
- Entity: Federation of Bosnia and Herzegovina
- Canton: Una-Sana
- Municipality: Bihać

Area
  - Total: 2.54 sq mi (6.59 km^{2})

Population (2013)
  - Total: 19
  - Density: 7.5/sq mi (2.9/km^{2})
- Time zone: UTC+1 (CET)
  - Summer (DST): UTC+2 (CEST)

Donja Gata (Serbian Cyrillic: Доња Гата) is a small village in the municipality of Bihać, Bosnia and Herzegovina.

== Demographics ==
According to the 2013 census, its population was 19.

Ethnicity in 2013
| Ethnicity | Number | Percentage |
|---|---|---|
| Bosniaks | 18 | 94.7% |
| Serbs | 1 | 5.3% |
| Total | 19 | 100% |
