= Velika Gata =

Velika Gata Велика Гата
- Village
- Location within Bosnia and Herzegovina
- Coordinates: 44°55′04″N 15°49′16″E
- Country: Bosnia and Herzegovina
- Entity: Federation of Bosnia and Herzegovina
- Canton: Una-Sana
- Municipality: Bihać

Area
  - Total: 4.12 sq mi (10.66 km^{2})

Population (2013)
  - Total: 1,094
  - Density: 265.8/sq mi (102.6/km^{2})
- Time zone: UTC+1 (CET)
  - Summer (DST): UTC+2 (CEST)

Velika Gata (Serbian Cyrillic: Велика Гата) is a village in the municipality of Bihać, Bosnia and Herzegovina.

== Demographics ==
According to the 2013 census, its population was 1,094.

Ethnicity in 2013
Ethnicity	Number	Percentage
Bosniaks	1,042	95.2%
Croats	9	0.8%
Serbs	1	0.1%
other/undeclared	42	3.8%
Total	1,094	100%
