= Vikići =

Vikići Викићи
- Village
- Location within Bosnia and Herzegovina
- Coordinates: 44°54′N 15°47′E
- Country: Bosnia and Herzegovina
- Entity: Federation of Bosnia and Herzegovina
- Canton: Una-Sana
- Municipality: Bihać

Area
  - Total: 2.75 sq mi (7.12 km^{2})

Population (2013)
  - Total: 985
  - Density: 358/sq mi (138/km^{2})
- Time zone: UTC+1 (CET)
  - Summer (DST): UTC+2 (CEST)

Vikići (Serbian Cyrillic: Викићи) is a village in the municipality of Bihać, Bosnia and Herzegovina.

== Demographics ==
According to the 2013 census, its population was 985.

Ethnicity in 2013
Ethnicity	Number	Percentage
Bosniaks	933	94.7%
Croats	2	0.2%
Serbs	3	0.3%
other/undeclared	47	4.8%
Total	985	100%
