= Bihać =

Bihać Бихаћ
- City
- Grad Bihać; Град Бихаћ; City of Bihać
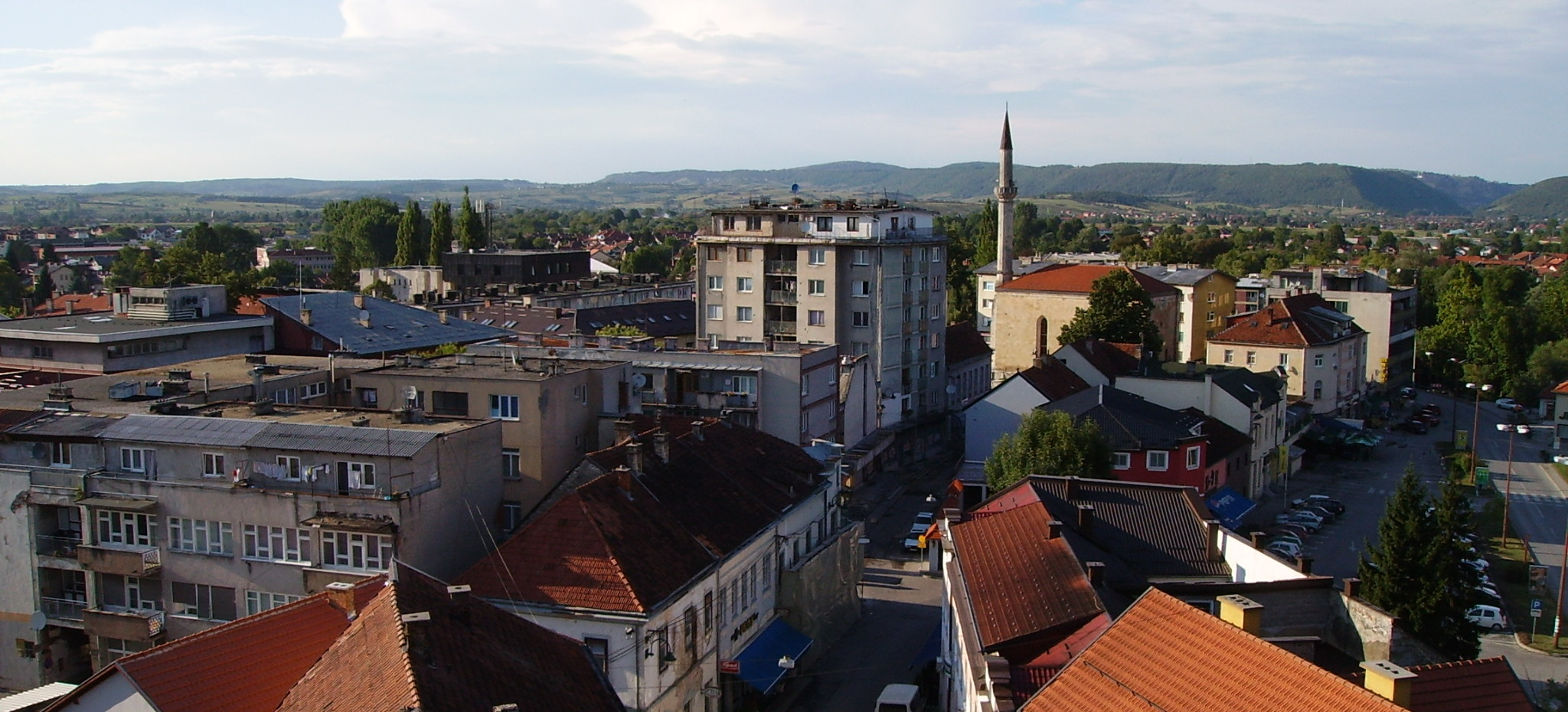
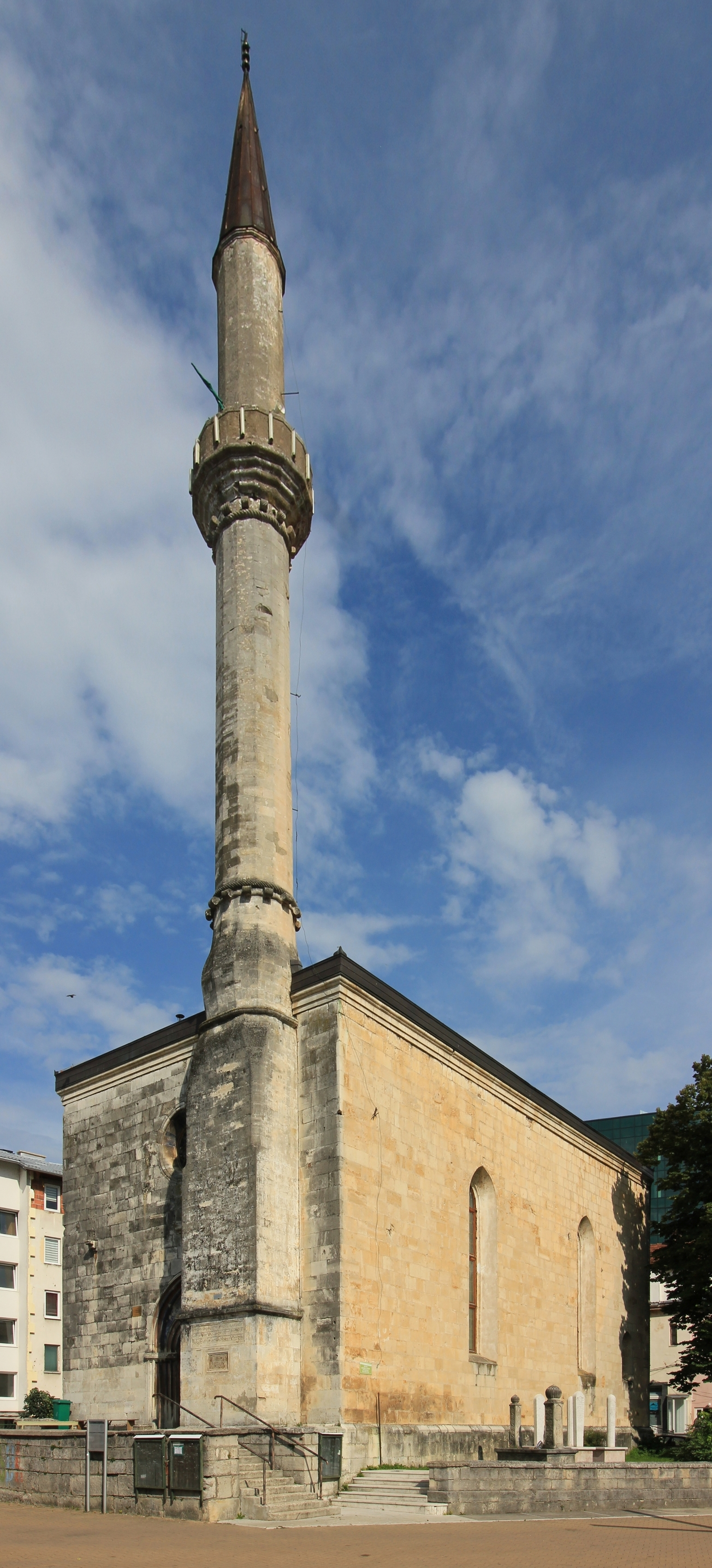
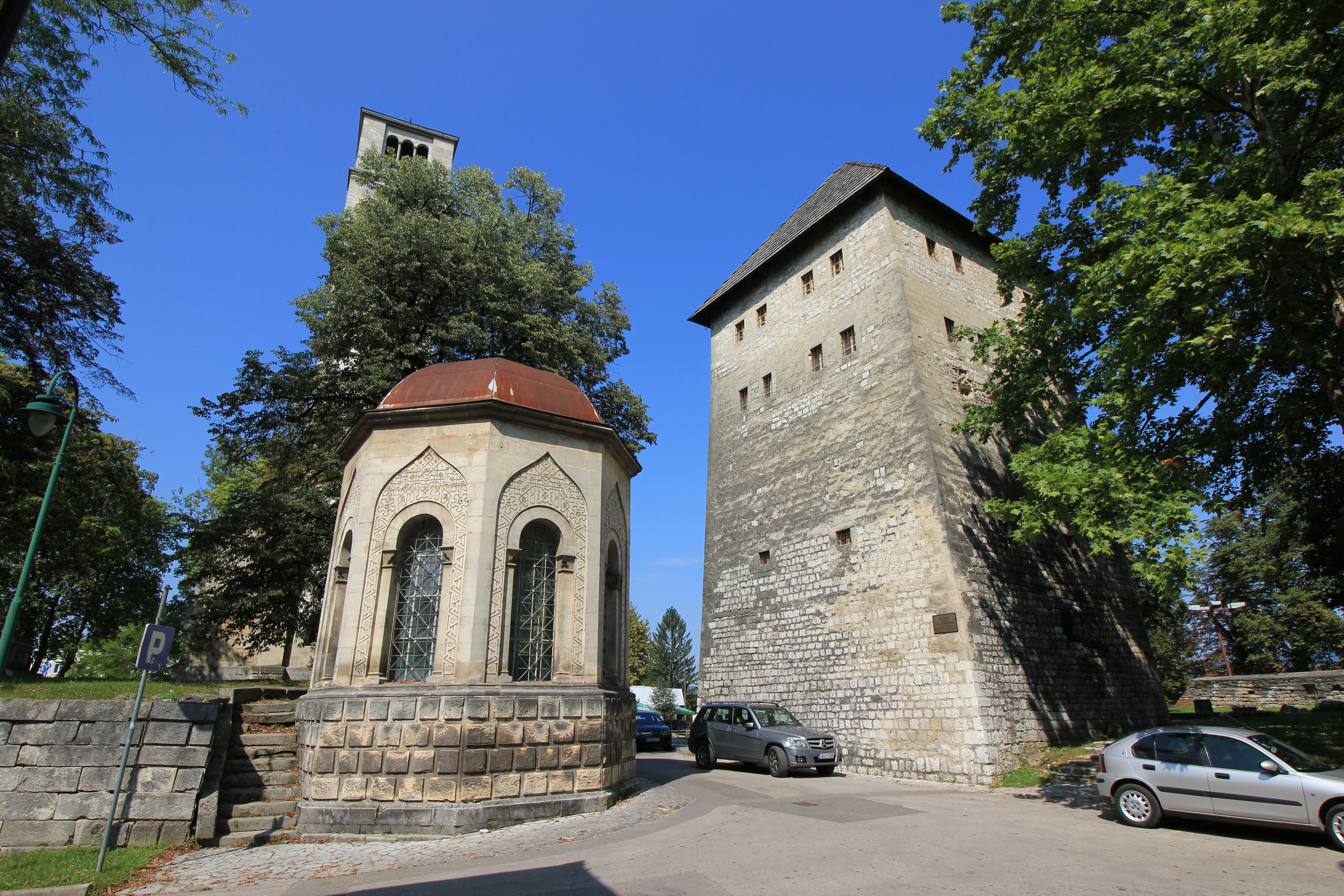
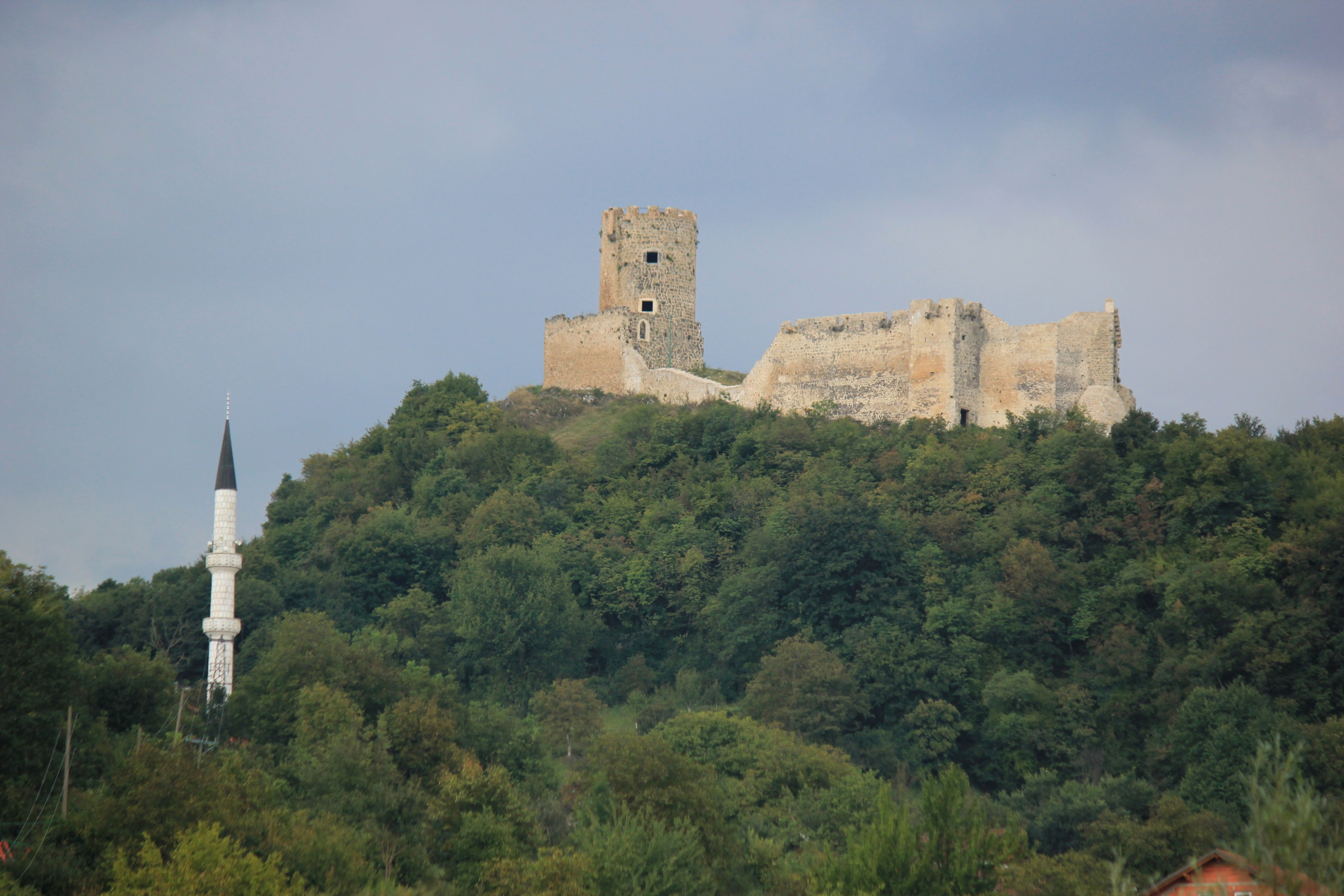
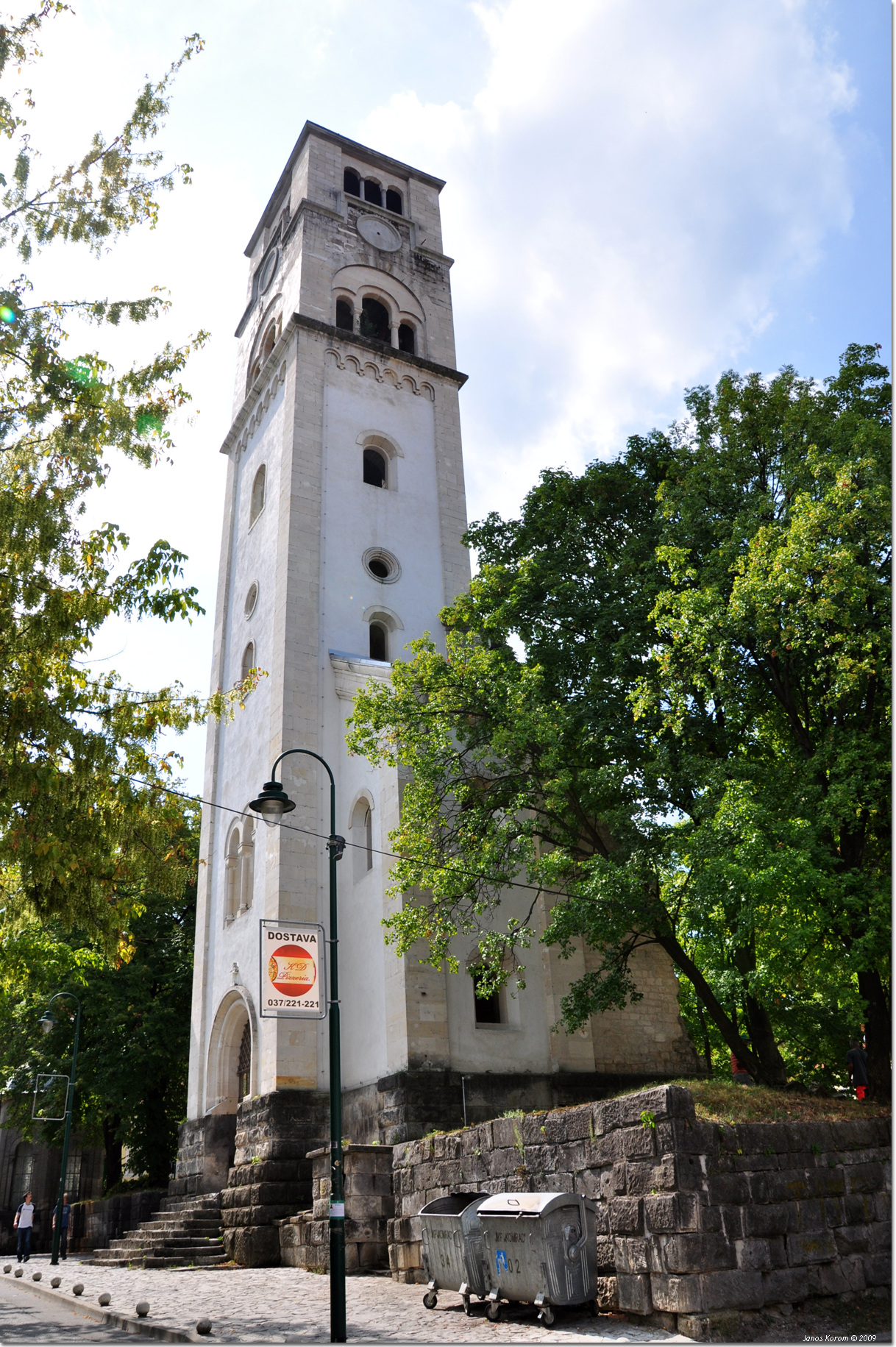
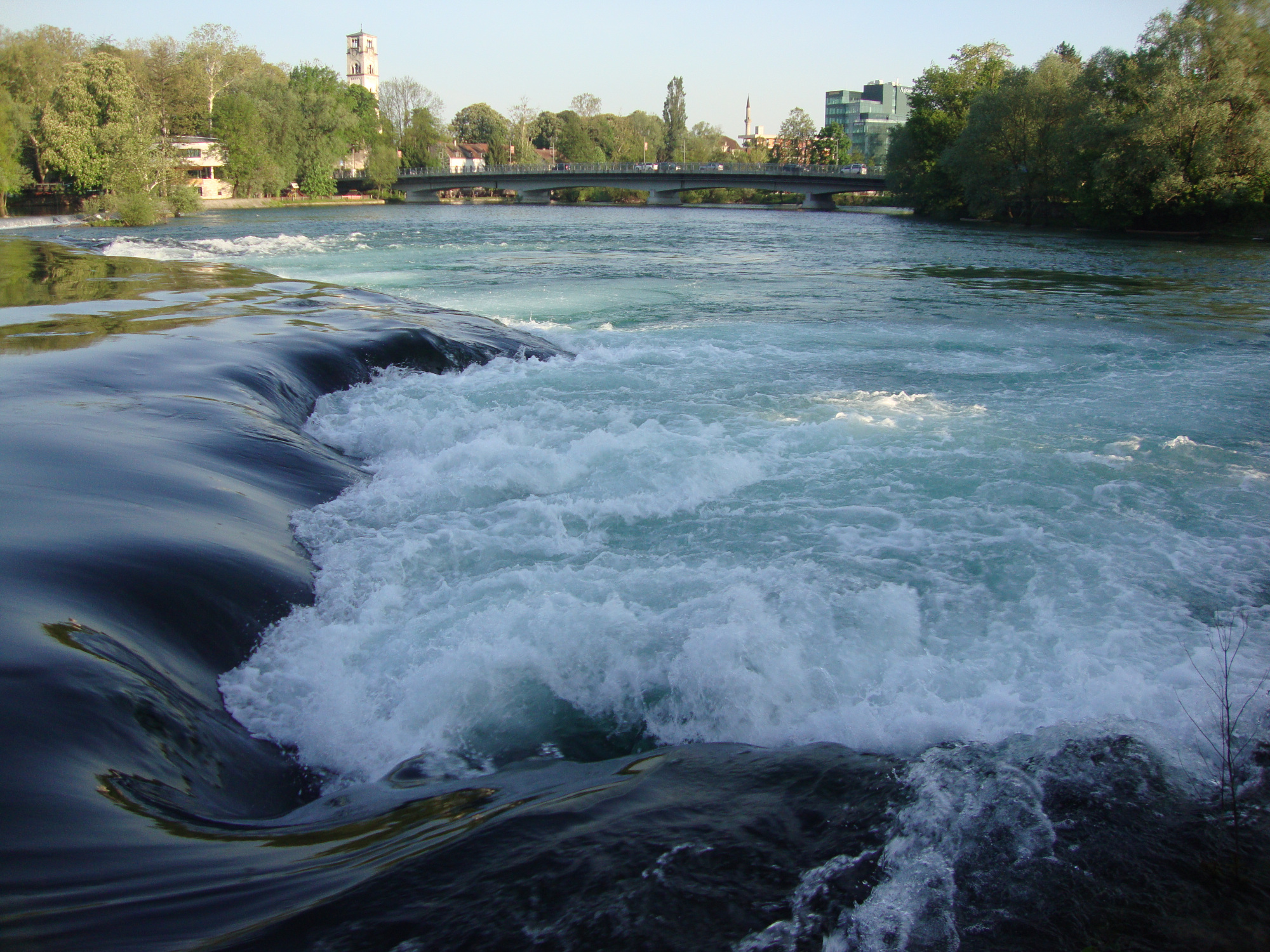
- Skyline Fethija Mosque Turbe Mausoleum (left) and the Captain's Tower (right) Sokolac Fortress Church of Saint Anthony of Padua Una river

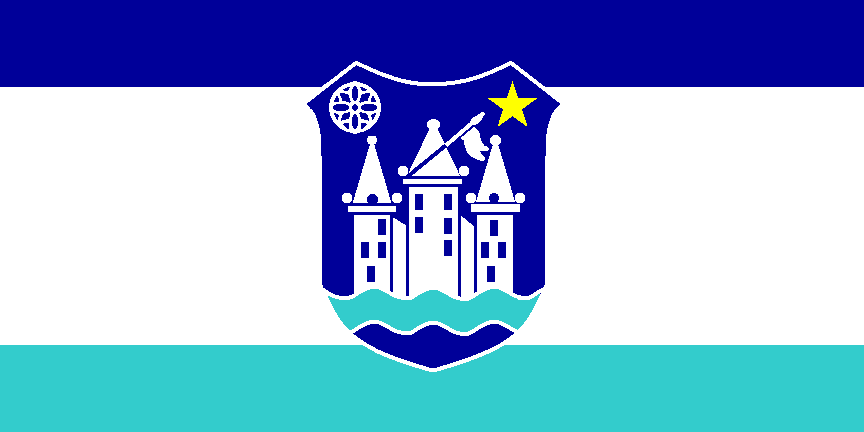
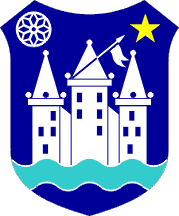
- Flag Coat of arms

- Location of Bihać within Bosnia and Herzegovina.
- Interactive map of Bihać
- Location in Bosnia and Herzegovina
- Coordinates: 44°48′53″N 15°52′09″E
- Country: Bosnia and Herzegovina
- Entity: Federation of Bosnia and Herzegovina
- Canton: Una-Sana
- Geographical region: Bosanska Krajina

Government
  - Mayor: Elvedin Sedić (POMAK)
  - City Council: 30 members: • SDA (9); • POMAK (9); • SDP (4); • NES (3); • NiP (2); • SBiH (1); • MB (1); • DF (1)

Area
  - City: 900 km^{2} (350 sq mi)
  - Urban: 163 km^{2} (63 sq mi)
- Elevation: 230 m (750 ft)

Population (2013 census)
  - City: 56,261
  - Density: 63/km^{2} (160/sq mi)
  - Urban: 43,007
- Time zone: UTC+1 (CET)
  - Summer (DST): UTC+2 (CEST)
- ZIP code: 77000
- Area code: +387 37
- Website: www.bihac.org

Bihać (pronounced [bǐxaːtɕ]) is a city and the administrative centre of Una-Sana Canton of the Federation of Bosnia and Herzegovina, an entity of Bosnia and Herzegovina. It is situated on the banks of river Una in northwestern Bosnia and Herzegovina, in the Bosanska Krajina region close to the border with Croatia. In 2013 its population was 56,261.

== History ==
According to documents and historical sources, the first medieval urban settlements and towns around the Una river, began to appear in the middle of the 13th century. Bihać, as the centre of Pounje, was first mentioned on 26 February 1260, in the charter of Hungarian King Béla IV, and was described as a town built on the river's Island of St. Ladislav, owned by the Benedictine abbey of Topusko. Just two years later, in 1262, Béla proclaimed Bihać a royal free city and placed it under the direct authority of the Hungarian throne, with all rights and privileges pertaining thereto, which ensured its ability to develop completely independent from the political powers of local lords. The following mention in the charter of 1271 confirms that Bihać at that time enjoyed the status of a free city. At the head of the municipality was the town elder or major villae, who was often called a judge, and whose decision could only be changed by the king. Bihać also had a curia or magistrates, an assembly of local citizens who took the oath of office for this duty, and notaries who kept court and other civil records.

In 1530 Austria sent troops to defend seven key strongholds in Croatia, one of them was Bihać and another the nearby Ripač. The Ottomans occupied Bihać in 1592 after a 10-day siege and from that time Bihać was the most important forts in Bosnia until the 19th century. Ottoman rule was briefly interrupted by Auguste Marmont, general-governor of Illyrian Provinces on 5 May 1810. He sought to prevent Ottomans from raiding French Croatia and finishing the Ottoman occupation of Cetin. After fulfilling these goals, he withdrew from Bihać. Ottoman rule in Bihać ended de facto after the Congress of Berlin.

During World War II, the town was occupied by Axis troops and was included into Pavelić's Independent State of Croatia (NDH). The fascist Ustaše regime committed the Genocide of the Serbs and the Holocaust. From July to September 1941, some 15,000 Serbs were massacred along with some Jews and Roma victims by the Ustaše at the Garavice, an extermination location near Bihać. When the German and Italian Zones of Influence were revised on 24 June 1942, Bihać fell in Zone III, administered civilly by Croatia and militarily by Croatia and Germany. The town was the capital of a short-lived territory, the Bihać Republic, for two months in late 1942 and early 1943, until it was recaptured by German forces. From 1943 Judita Alargić served near to Bihać as an instructor of the Central Committee of the Communist Party of Yugoslavia. Bihać returned to Bosnian territory on 28 March 1945.

Bihać was besieged for three years from 1992 to 1995 during the Bosnian War.

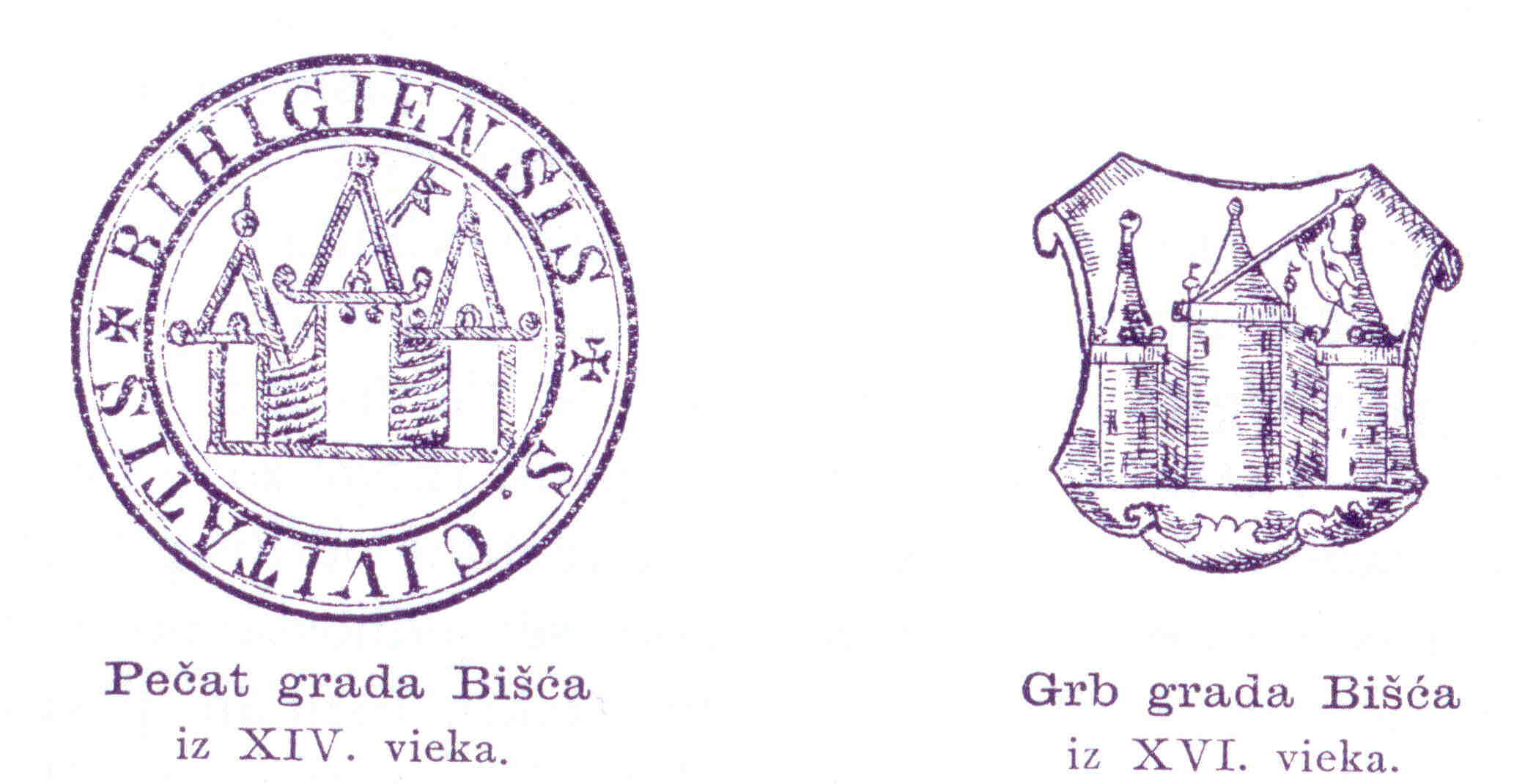
The Seal and Armorial Bearings of Bihać town from the 14th century.

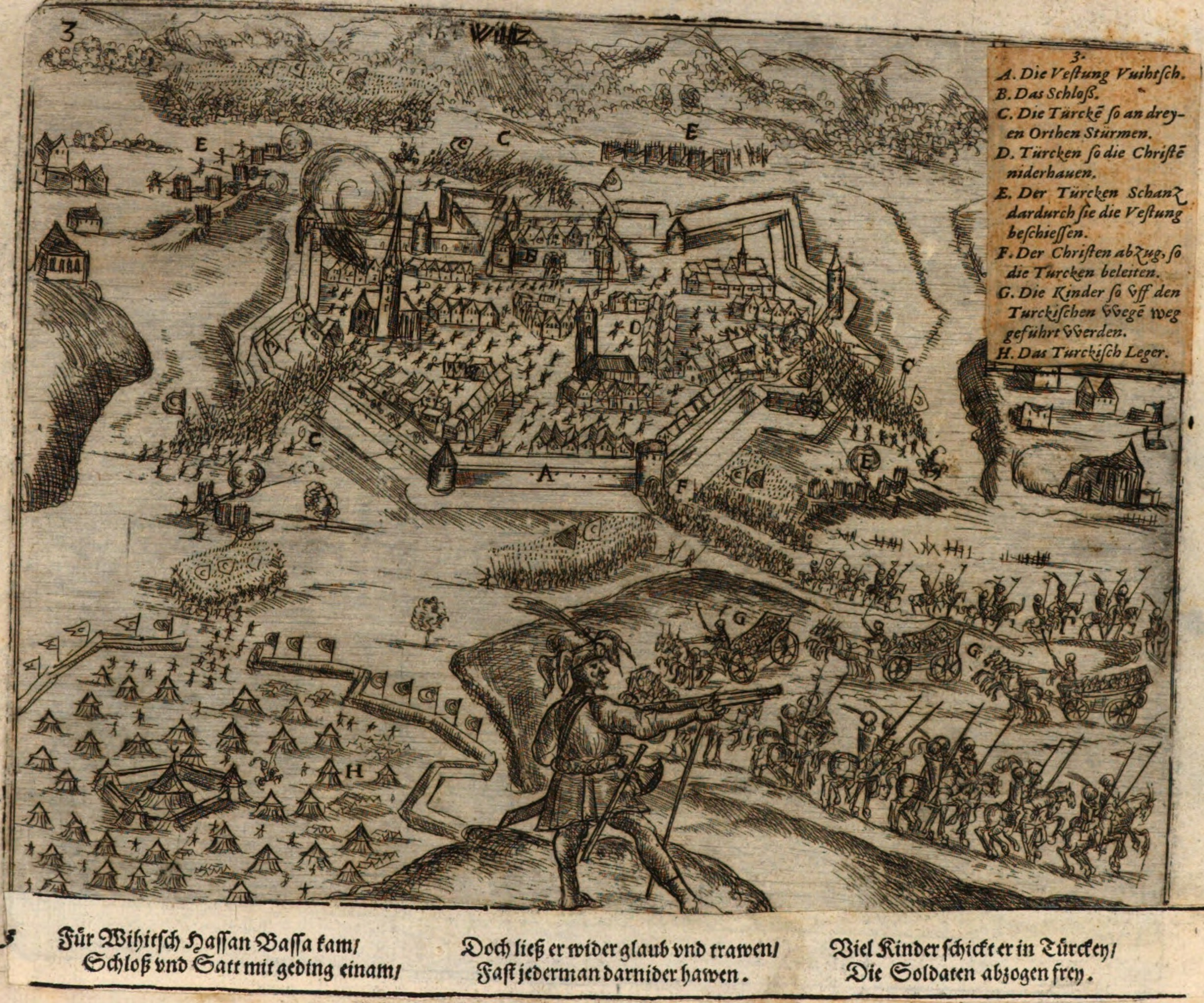
Siege of Bihać in 1592

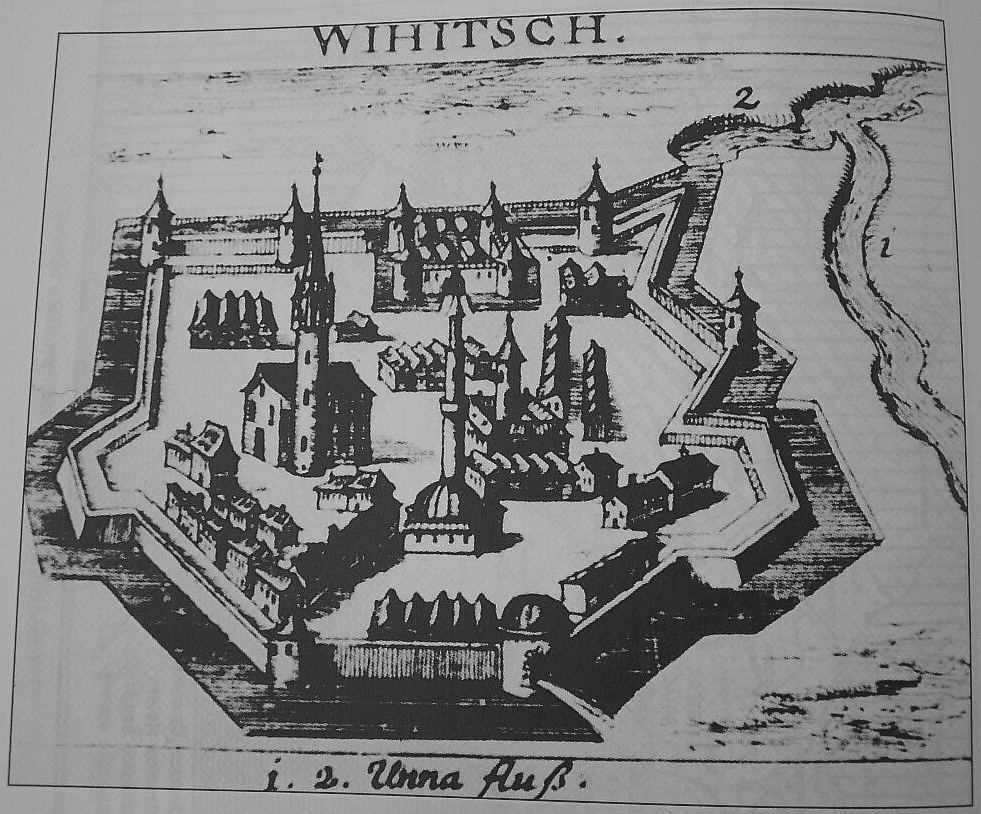
Bihać fortress (Wihitsch), 1686

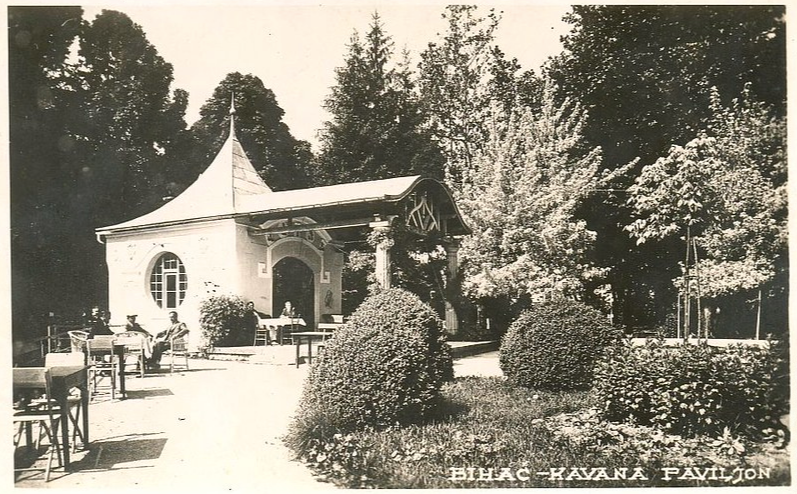
Coffee pavilion in Bihać, c. 1900

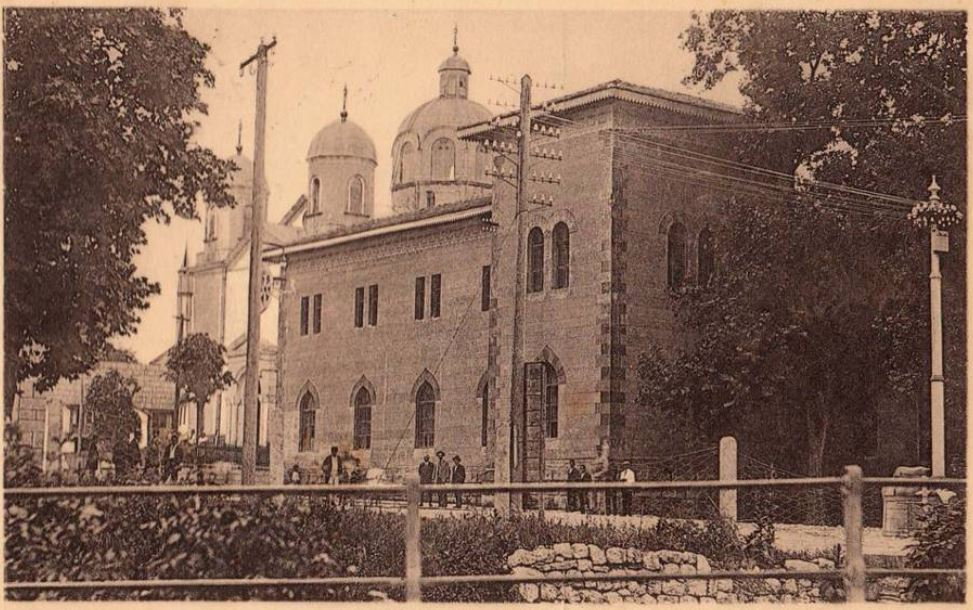
Bihać Orthodox Church and Medresa, c. 1910

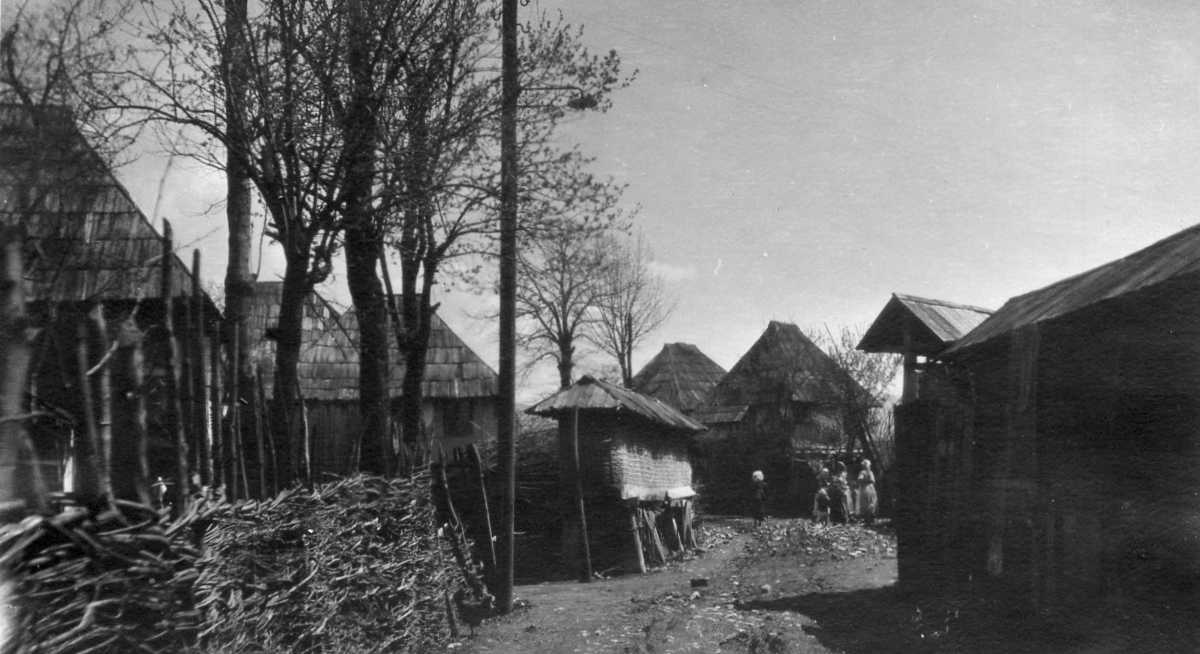
Rural houses in Bihać, c. 1930

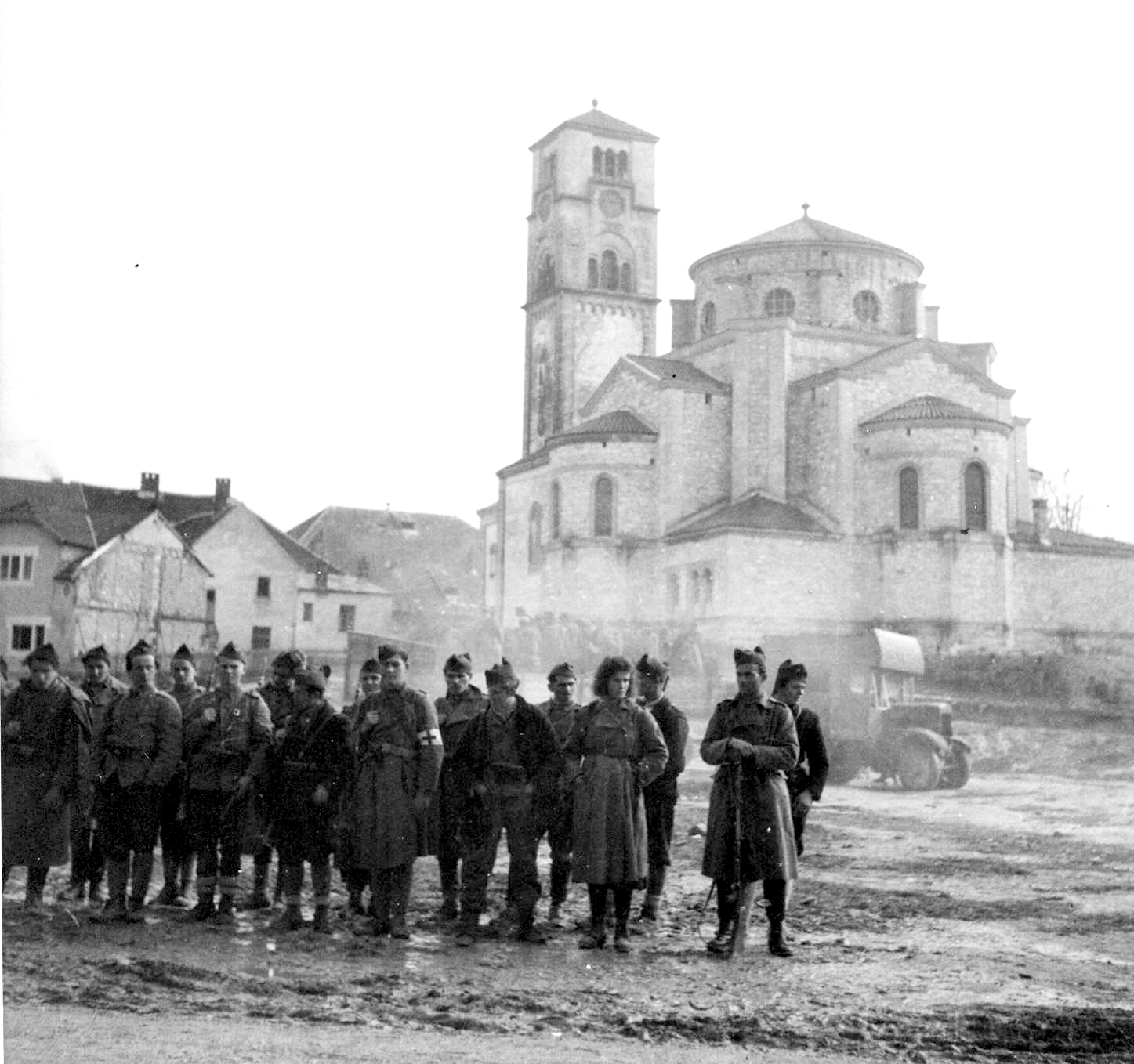
Partisans in Bihać, 1942

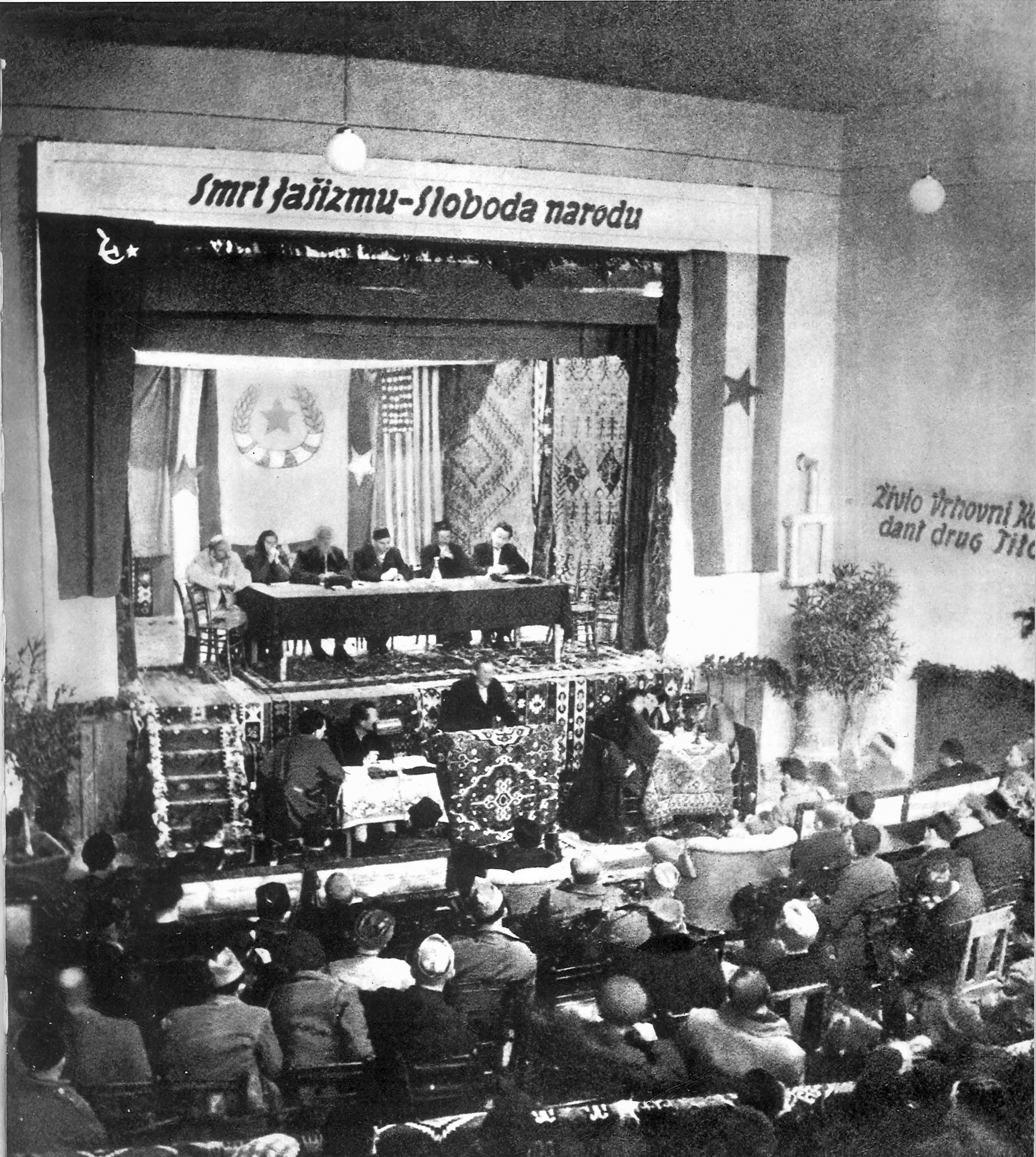
First session of the AVNOJ in Bihać, 1942

== Demographics ==
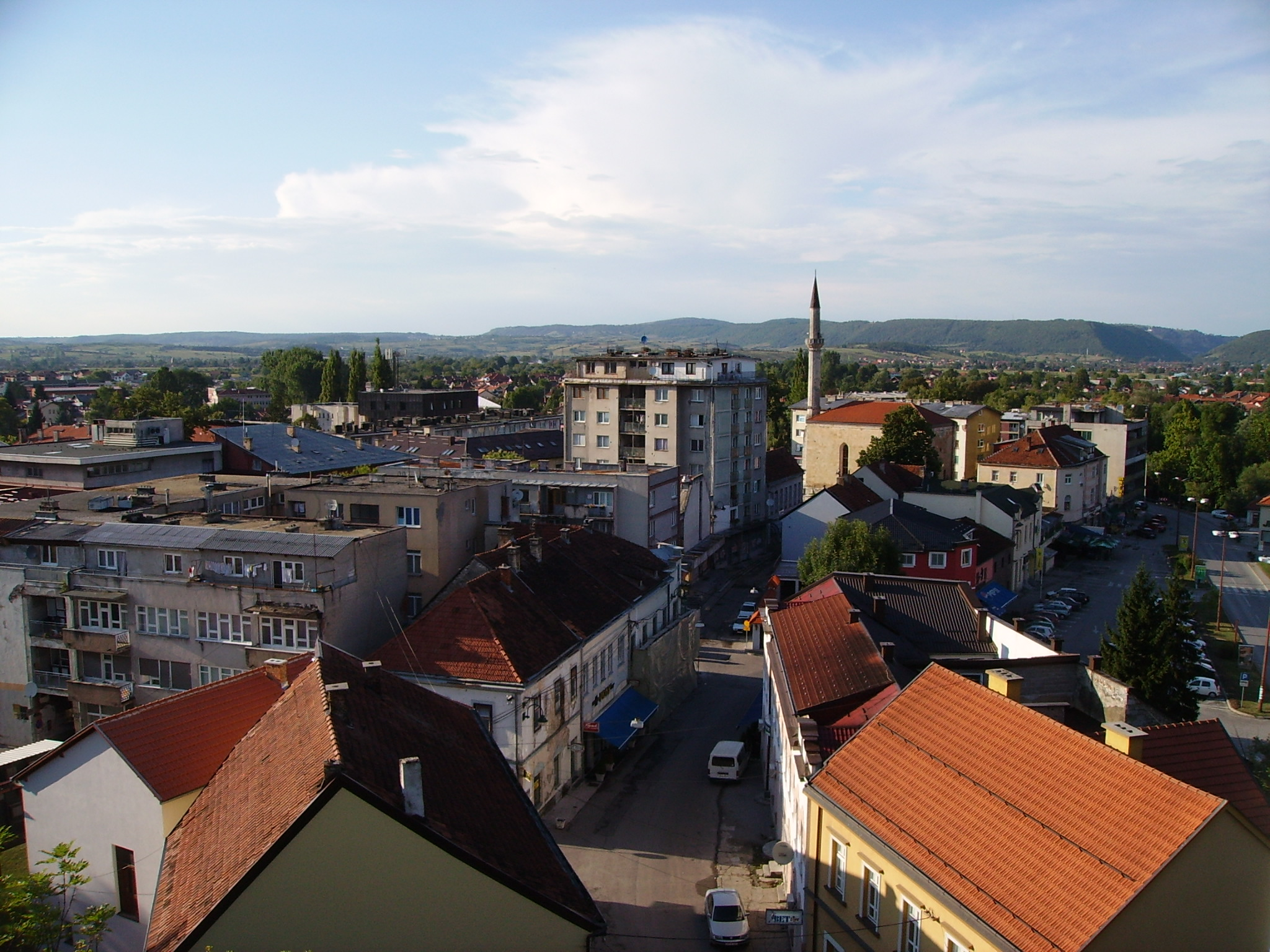
Bihać inner city panorama

According to the 2013 census, the city of Bihać has a population of 56,261 inhabitants.

=== Ethnic groups ===
The ethnic composition of the municipality:

Ethnic group	Population 2013
Bosniaks	49,550 (88.1%)
Croats	3,265 (5.8%)
Serbs	910 (1.62%)
Yugoslavs	21 (0.04%)
Others/Unspecified	2,536 (4.47%)
Total	56,261 (100%)

In the 1991 population census in Bosnia and Herzegovina the ethnic composition of the municipality was 46,737 Bosniaks, 12,689 Serbs, 5,580 Croats, 4,356 Yugoslavs and 1,370 Others.

=== Religion ===
According to the 2013 census, the religious makeup of Bihać includes:

- 49,550 Islam (88.01%)
- 3,265 Catholic (5.08%)
- 910 Orthodox (1.62%)
- 2,536 others (4.47%)

=== Settlements ===
The following settlements comprise the administrative area of the city of Bihać:

- Bajrići
- Brekovica
- Bugar
- Ćukovi
- Doljani
- Donja Gata
- Dubovsko
- Gorjevac
- Grabež
- Grmuša
- Hrgar
- Izačić
- Jezero
- Kalati
- Kulen Vakuf
- Lohovo
- Lohovska Brda
- Mala Peća
- Mali Skočaj
- Međudražje
- Muslići
- Ostrovica
- Papari
- Pokoj
- Praščijak
- Pritoka
- Račić
- Rajinovci
- Ripač
- Spahići
- Srbljani
- Velika Gata
- Veliki Skočaj
- Veliki Stjenjani
- Vikići
- Vrsta
- Zavalje i Zlopoljac

== Geography ==
=== Climate ===
Climate data for Bihać (1961–1990, extremes 1949–present)
Month	Jan	Feb	Mar	Apr	May	Jun	Jul	Aug	Sep	Oct	Nov	Dec	Year
Record high °C (°F)	21.2 (70.2)	24.2 (75.6)	27.2 (81.0)	30.8 (87.4)	33.7 (92.7)	38.9 (102.0)	41.2 (106.2)	42.0 (107.6)	36.1 (97.0)	31.5 (88.7)	26.6 (79.9)	21.0 (69.8)	42.0 (107.6)
Mean daily maximum °C (°F)	4.0 (39.2)	6.5 (43.7)	11.2 (52.2)	16.3 (61.3)	21.0 (69.8)	24.2 (75.6)	26.7 (80.1)	26.2 (79.2)	22.6 (72.7)	16.9 (62.4)	10.6 (51.1)	5.3 (41.5)	15.9 (60.6)
Daily mean °C (°F)	0.3 (32.5)	2.3 (36.1)	6.1 (43.0)	10.7 (51.3)	15.1 (59.2)	18.3 (64.9)	20.1 (68.2)	19.3 (66.7)	15.9 (60.6)	11.3 (52.3)	6.3 (43.3)	1.7 (35.1)	10.6 (51.1)
Mean daily minimum °C (°F)	−3.7 (25.3)	−1.7 (28.9)	1.2 (34.2)	5.1 (41.2)	9.1 (48.4)	12.2 (54.0)	13.3 (55.9)	13.0 (55.4)	10.3 (50.5)	6.5 (43.7)	2.3 (36.1)	−1.9 (28.6)	5.5 (41.9)
Record low °C (°F)	−24.8 (−12.6)	−29.2 (−20.6)	−21.0 (−5.8)	−5.4 (22.3)	−3.3 (26.1)	1.4 (34.5)	4.4 (39.9)	3.6 (38.5)	−2.4 (27.7)	−7.0 (19.4)	−18.0 (−0.4)	−18.2 (−0.8)	−29.2 (−20.6)
Average precipitation mm (inches)	85.8 (3.38)	90.8 (3.57)	99.2 (3.91)	115.0 (4.53)	116.3 (4.58)	109.0 (4.29)	105.9 (4.17)	109.5 (4.31)	107.9 (4.25)	109.6 (4.31)	146.2 (5.76)	113.6 (4.47)	1,308.8 (51.53)
Average precipitation days (≥ 0.1 mm)	13.8	14.3	14.5	14.6	14.2	14.0	10.1	10.5	10.0	12.2	14.2	15.0	157.4
Average snowy days (≥ 1.0 cm)	16.2	13.4	8.4	1.2	0.0	0.0	0.0	0.0	0.0	0.2	5.0	13.1	57.5
Average relative humidity (%)	79.8	76.7	70.6	66.7	68.9	70.5	69.3	73.1	76.5	77.6	78.9	80.6	74.1
Mean monthly sunshine hours	58.3	74.0	125.4	152.1	202.1	219.7	265.6	228.2	171.6	117.4	73.2	50.3	1,737.9
Source: Meteorological Institute of Bosnia and Herzegovina

== Economy ==
The agricultural sector is significant, due to the large and fertile soil.

== Notable people ==
- Mehmed Alajbegović, politician and lawyer
- Mersada Bećirspahić, basketball player
- Christopher Corvinus (Christopher Hunyadi, 1499–1505), Prince of Hungary and the last male member of the Hungarian Royal House of Hunyadi
- Zlatko Dedić, Slovenian footballer
- Ferid Džanić, World War II Axis soldier (SS Handschar Division)
- Nihad Hasanović, writer and translator
- Alen Islamović, singer, lead vocalist of the bands Divlje Jagode and Bijelo Dugme
- Donna Ares, singer-songwriter and musician (1977–2017)
- Zele Lipovača, musician, leading member of Divlje Jagode
- Irfan Ljubijankić, facial surgeon, classical music composer, politician and diplomat of Bosnia and Herzegovina
- Dejan Matić, singer
- Saša Matić, pop singer
- Džanan Musa, basketball player, European U16 champion
- Milan Muškatirović, water polo goalkeeper and professor of organic chemistry
- Mustafa Hilmi Hadžiomerović, Grand Mufti for Bosnia and Herzegovina (1882 to 1893)
- Saša Radulović, Serbian engineer, politician and former Minister of Economy
- Branka Raunig, archaeologist and museum curator
- Faruk Šehić, poet
- Borislav Stanković, Serbian basketball player, coach and secretary General of FIBA * Omer Nadarević, Known online as omčo, is a Bosnian youTuber filmmaker

== Twin towns – sister cities ==
Bihać is twinned with:

- Bondeno, Italy
- Kikinda, Serbia
- Kuşadası, Turkey
- Nagykanizsa, Hungary
- Novo Mesto, Slovenia
- Reșița, Romania
- Villefranche-de-Rouergue, France
- Kartepe, Turkey
- Gospić, Croatia

== See also ==
- Fethija mosque
- Turbe Mausoleum
- Siege of Bihać (disambiguation)
- University of Bihać, opened in 1997
- NK Jedinstvo Bihać, local soccer club
- Željava Air Base
- Bihać Republic
- Una National Park
- Bihać Oblast

== Notes ==
- Official results from the book: Ethnic composition of Bosnia-Herzegovina population, by municipalities and settlements, 1991. census, Zavod za statistiku Bosne i Hercegovine - Bilten no.234, Sarajevo 1991.

== Bibliography ==
- Trgo, Fabijan, ed. (1964). Zbornik dokumenata i podataka o Narodno-oslobodilačkom ratu Jugoslovenskih naroda. Vol. V, 32.
