= Veliki Stjenjani =

Veliki Stjenjani Велики Стјењани
- Village
- Location within Bosnia and Herzegovina
- Coordinates: 44°34′N 16°08′E
- Country: Bosnia and Herzegovina
- Entity: Federation of Bosnia and Herzegovina
- Canton: Una-Sana
- Municipality: Bihać

Area
  - Total: 7.27 sq mi (18.83 km^{2})

Population (2013)
  - Total: 0
  - Density: 0.0/sq mi (0.0/km^{2})
- Time zone: UTC+1 (CET)
  - Summer (DST): UTC+2 (CEST)

Veliki Stjenjani (Serbian Cyrillic: Велики Стјењани) is a village in the municipality of Bihać, Bosnia and Herzegovina.

== Demographics ==
According to the 2013 census, its population was nil, down from 57 in 1991.
