= Jezero, Bihać =

Village in Bosnia and Herzegovina

Jezero Језеро
- Village
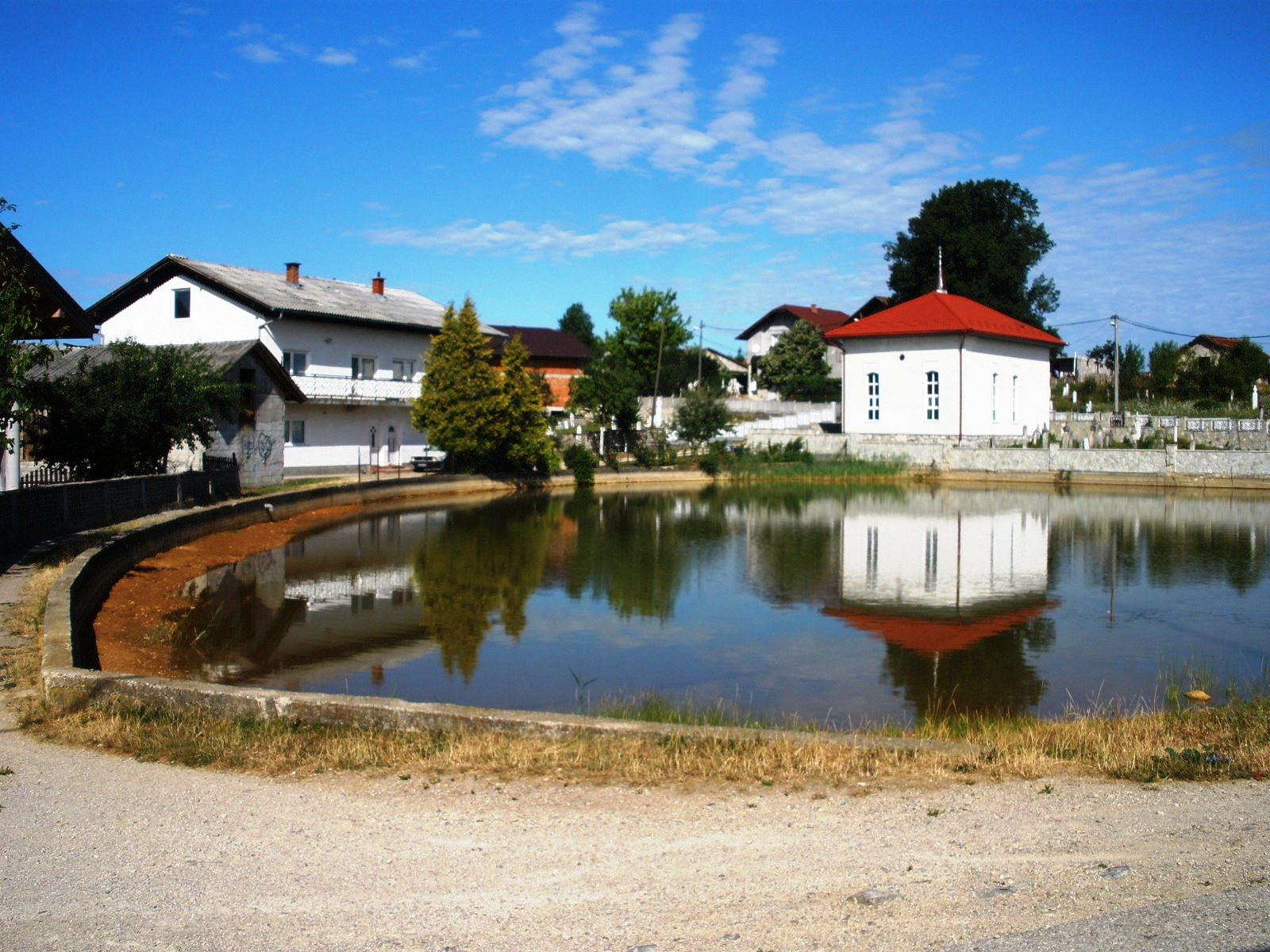

- Location within Bosnia and Herzegovina
- Coordinates: 44°48′20″N 15°52′25″E
- Country: Bosnia and Herzegovina
- Entity: Federation of Bosnia and Herzegovina
- Canton: Una-Sana
- Municipality: Bihać

Area
  - Total: 7.83 sq mi (20.29 km^{2})

Population (2013)
  - Total: 436
  - Density: 55.7/sq mi (21.5/km^{2})
- Time zone: UTC+1 (CET)
  - Summer (DST): UTC+2 (CEST)

Jezero (Serbian Cyrillic: Језеро) is a village in the municipality of Bihać, Bosnia and Herzegovina.

== Demographics ==
According to the 2013 census, its population was 1,618.

Ethnicity in 2013
Ethnicity	Number	Percentage
Bosniaks	433	99.3%
Serbs	1	0.2%
other/undeclared	2	0.5%
Total	436	100%
