= Veliki Skočaj =

Veliki Skočaj Велики Скочај
- Village
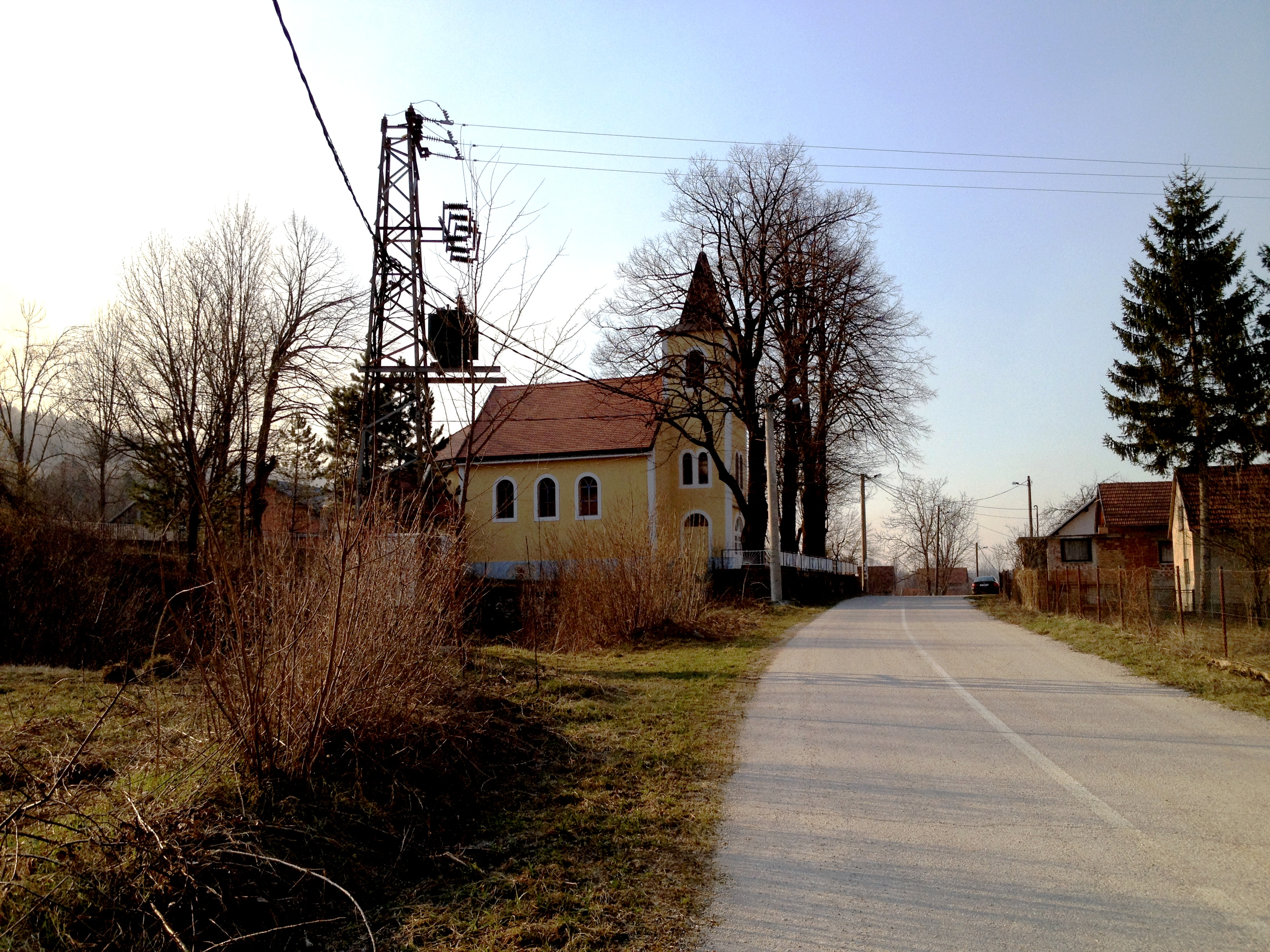

- Location within Bosnia and Herzegovina
- Coordinates: 44°45′N 15°52′E
- Country: Bosnia and Herzegovina
- Entity: Federation of Bosnia and Herzegovina
- Canton: Una-Sana
- Municipality: Bihać

Area
  - Total: 2.69 sq mi (6.98 km^{2})

Population (2013)
  - Total: 56
  - Density: 21/sq mi (8.0/km^{2})
- Time zone: UTC+1 (CET)
  - Summer (DST): UTC+2 (CEST)

Veliki Skočaj (Serbian Cyrillic: Велики Скочај) is a village in the municipality of Bihać, Bosnia and Herzegovina.

== Demographics ==
According to the 2013 census, its population was 56.

Ethnicity in 2013
Ethnicity	Number	Percentage
Croats	55	98.2%
Bosniaks	1	1.8%
Total	56	100%
