= Turbe Mausoleum (Bihać) =

Islamic burial site in Bosnia and Herzegovina

Coordinates: 44°48′50″N 15°52′13″E

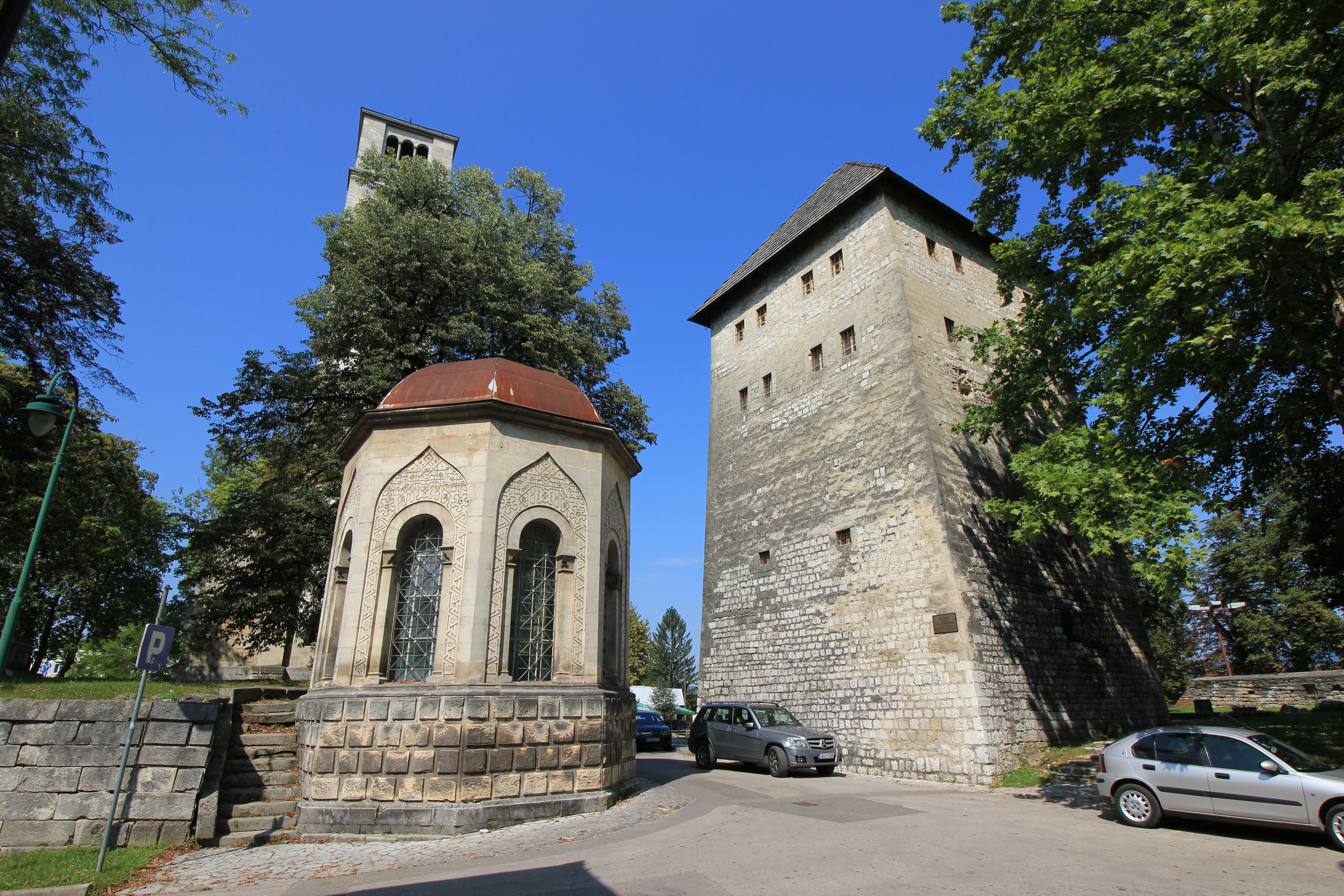
Turbe (left)

Turbe Mauzolej (transl. Turbe Mausoleum), is a turbe (a kind of Islamic mausoleum) in Bihać, Bosnia and Herzegovina, which originates from the period of Austro-Hungarian rule in Bosnia and Herzegovina and was built to show reverence for the defenders of the city who died in the fight against Austro-Hungarian troops in 1878.

== History ==
By the decision of the Berlin Congress, in June 1878, Austria-Hungary was given the right to annex Bosnia and Herzegovina. When the Austro-Hungarian army entered, it took several months to quell the resistance, especially of the Muslim population. The fighting under the walls of Bihać began on September 7, and only on September 19 did the defenders surrender the city of Bihać. The fall of Bihać had a discouraging effect on the defenders of other cities in the Bosanska Krajina, so they were subdued, mostly without any major resistance, except for Velika Kladuša and Pećigrad, where the resistance lasted until October 1878.

The Turbe mausoleum was built to show reverence for the defenders of the city who died in the fight against the Austro-Hungarian troops. The turbe was first made of wood, but a church was built on the site of it during 1890, and the Austro-Hungarian government, in order to get approval from the Muslim population of Bihać, built the current turbe at its own expense. However, some sources state that the turbe dates from the time of the Ottoman rule.

This purely sacral monument was severely damaged during the 1990s war, but it has been repaired and is today a powerful symbol of Bosniak spiritual culture in this region.

== Description ==
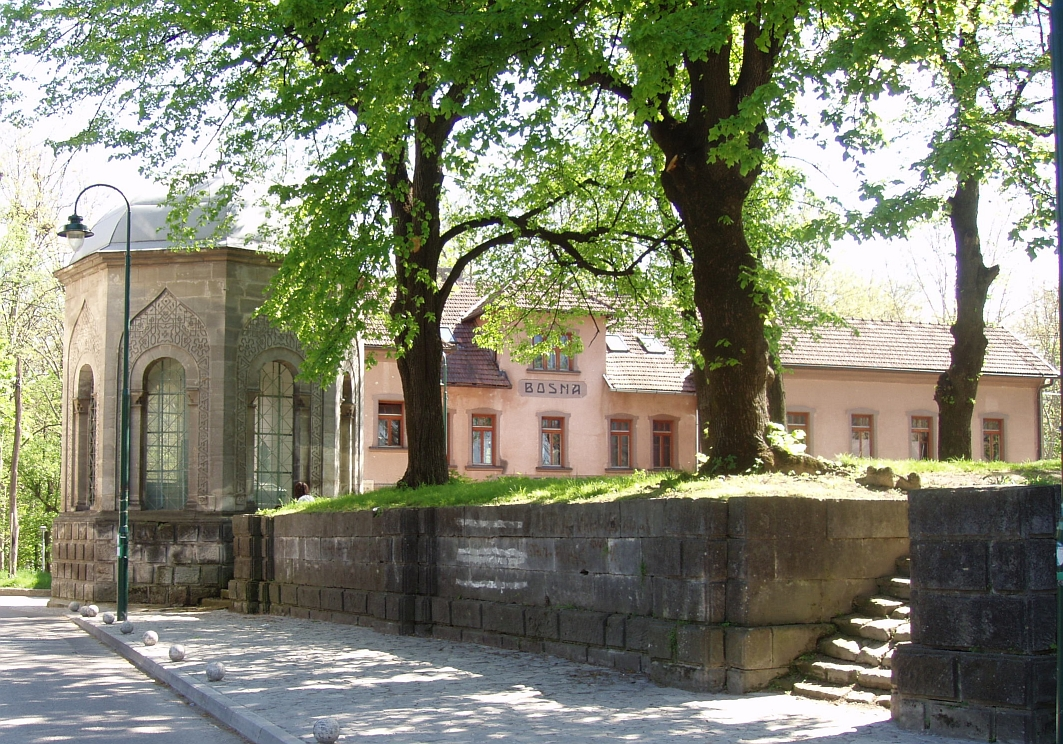
Turbe - Mausoleum in Bihać

The turbe belongs to the type with an octagonal base covered by a dome. The walls' edges are all equal, 2.60 meters in length. The wall material is a mixture of stone and brick, with the complete external facade made of bihacite stone, a very soft and light local limestone. The turbe is divided by a horizontal profiled stone cornice that protrudes 35 cm from the wall, on which the lower edge of the window rests. According to the proportions, the zone above the cornice is slightly larger and amounts to 2/3 of the height of the entire building, measured without a dome.

The upper part of the dome is built of precisely carved square blocks of bihacite stone laid very regularly, while the lower zone is built of roughly worked stone blocks arranged in four horizontal rows with very pronounced joints. The turbe is vaulted with a dome covered with galvanized metal sheets.

=== Interior ===
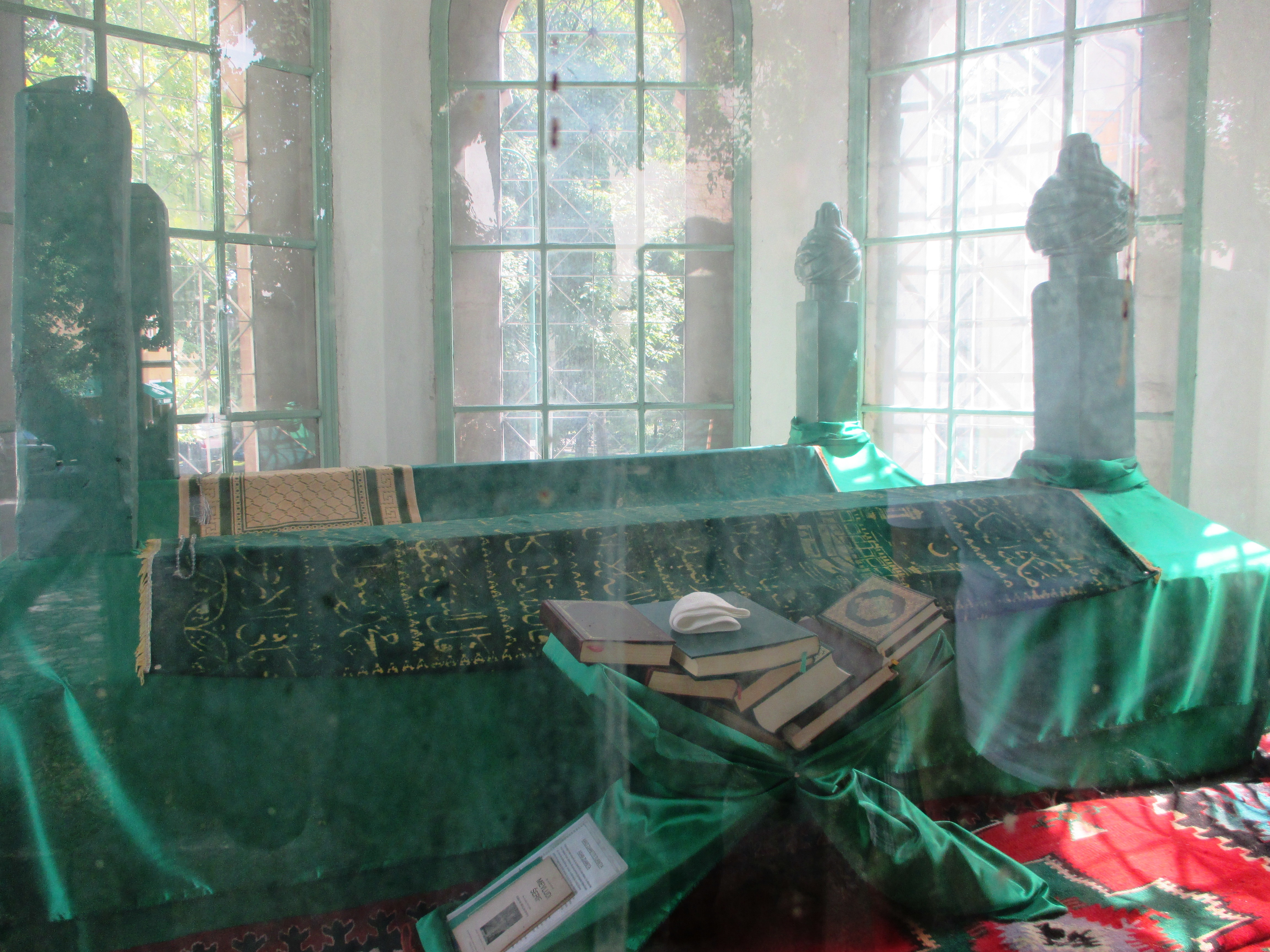
Interior of the turbe in Bihać

There are two wooden coffins in the turbe, each consisting of a sarcophagus with a nišan tombstone. There is no inscription on the turbe itself, or on the nišan tombstones, but they are decorated with numerous ornaments in the form of twisted ribbons.

== National monument ==
The historic building "Turbe Mausoleum in Bihać" has been declared a National Monument of Bosnia and Herzegovina by the Commission to Preserve National Monuments of Bosnia and Herzegovina.

== Bibliography ==
- Radoslav Lopašić, Bihać i Bihaćka krajina, [Bihać and Bihać region], Zagreb, 1890.
- Ćiro Truhelka, Sredovječni spomenici Bosanske Hrvatske, [Medieval monuments of Bosnian Croatia], "Hrvatsko kolo" XXIII, Zagreb, 1942.
- Branka Raunig, Fikreta Butić, Branko Bokan, Bihać i okolina, [Bihać and its surroundings], Turističko društvo "Una", Bihać, 1963.
- Dr Ekrem Hakki Ayverdi, AVRUPA 'DA OSMANLY MIMARI ESERLERI, II f.3 kitab, Baha Matabaasi, Istanbul, 1981.
- Mehmed Mujezinović, Islamska epigrafika Bosne i Hercegovine, [Islamic epigraphy of Bosnia and Herzegovina], knjiga 3, 3. izdanje, biblioteka "Kulturno naslijeđe", Sarajevo – Publishing, str. 61 – 65, 1998.
- Nikola Radić, Bihać sa starih razglednica, [Bihać from old postcards], Bihać, 2000.
- Abdulah Talundžić, Turbe i toranj crkve u Bihaću, [Turbe and church tower in Bihać], Mostar 2005: Most - časopis za obrazovanje, nauku i kulturu, 193 (104 - nova serija), str. 72.
