= Mali Skočaj =

Mali Skočaj Мали Скочај
- Village
- Location within Bosnia and Herzegovina
- Coordinates: 44°46′N 15°52′E
- Country: Bosnia and Herzegovina
- Entity: Federation of Bosnia and Herzegovina
- Canton: Una-Sana
- Municipality: Bihać

Area
  - Total: 5.98 sq mi (15.50 km^{2})

Population (2013)
  - Total: 22
  - Density: 3.7/sq mi (1.4/km^{2})
- Time zone: UTC+1 (CET)
  - Summer (DST): UTC+2 (CEST)

Mali Skočaj (Serbian Cyrillic: Мали Скочај) is a village in the municipality of Bihać, Bosnia and Herzegovina.

== Demographics ==
According to the 2013 census, its population was 22, all Croats.
