= Church of Saint Anthony of Padua (Bihać) =

- Church of Saint Anthony of Padua
- 44°48′36″N 15°51′58″E

The Church of St. Anthony of Padua (Bosnian: Crkva sv. Ante Padovanskog) is a Catholic church of the Diocese of Banja Luka, located in Bihać, Bosnia and Herzegovina. It is a unique feature of Bihać because the city has been home to three Catholic churches dedicated to St. Anthony of Padua.

== First church ==
The first church was built in 1266 as the town church under the administration of the Dominicans. It was constructed in the Gothic style, with a monastery located next to it. The church contained the tombs of numerous individuals, mostly members of the Croatian nobility.

In 1592, following the Siege of Bihać, the church was converted into a mosque by the Ottomans and named Fethija Mosque ("The Conquered"). The remains of the noble families were reburied beside the mosque, while their tombstones were incorporated into the mosque's floor. In 1894, these gravestones were transferred to the National Museum of Bosnia and Herzegovina in Sarajevo. The mosque (formerly the Church of St. Anthony), together with the tombstones, has been declared a National Monument of Bosnia and Herzegovina.

== Second church ==
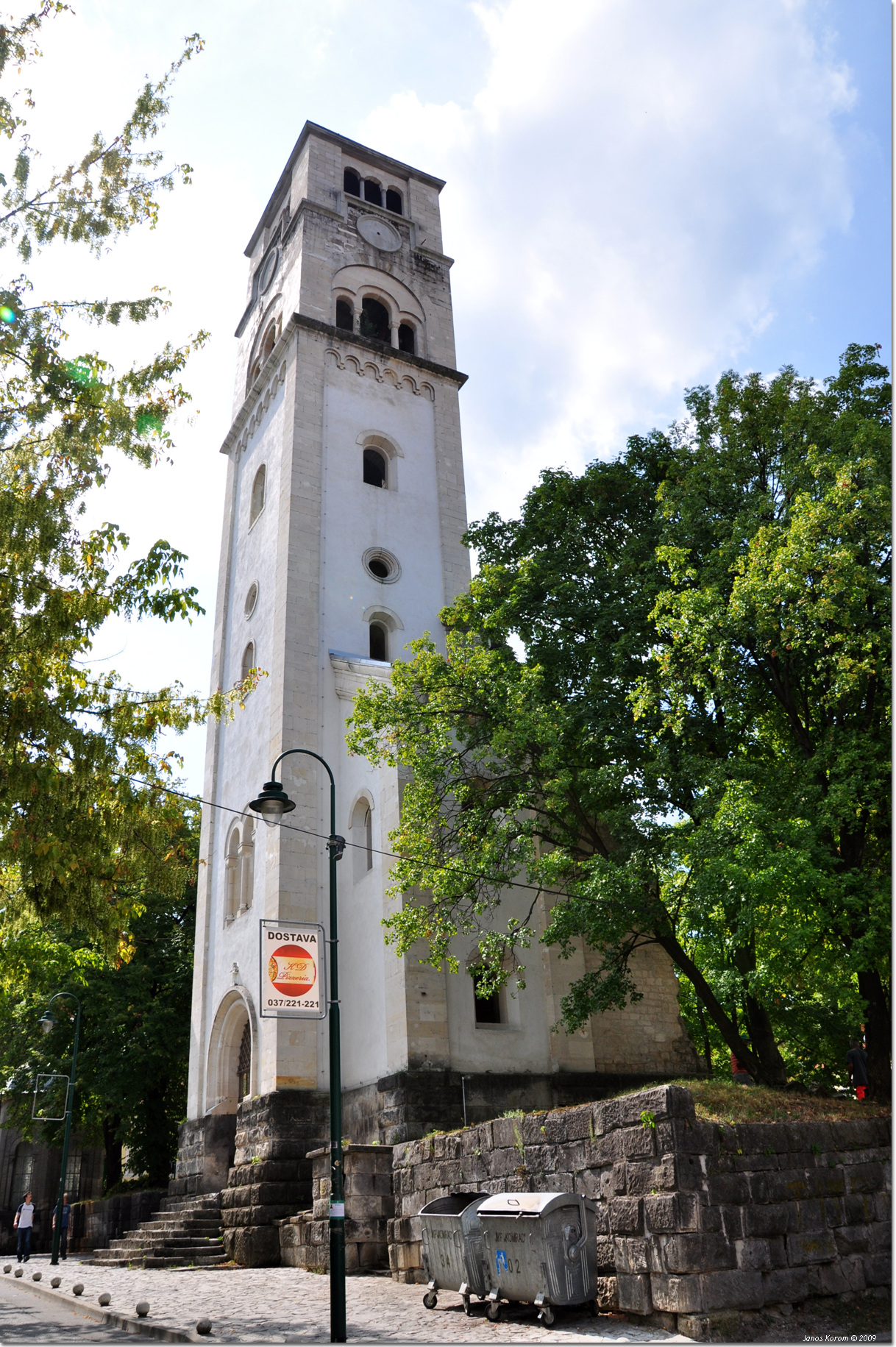
The bell tower of the second church

Construction of a new Church of St. Anthony in Bihać took place in several phases. The first phase was completed in 1891. The remains of the Croatian noblemen were transferred from the area around the first church (the current mosque) to a specially built tomb located about 50 meters from the second church.

In the second phase, in 1899, the church was extended by 11 meters, and a new semicircular sanctuary was added. Restoration of the church was completed in 1913.

During the third phase, from 1938 to 1941, the church was expanded again, and the tower was enlarged. In 1941, the authorities of the Independent State of Croatia ordered the demolition of the local Serbian Orthodox church next to the Catholic Church, with its building materials reused to expand the Catholic church and complete the bell tower.

In 1943, the Allied powers bombed Bihać. Among the buildings destroyed was the Church of St. Anthony. Today, only the bell tower and part of the walls remain. Together with the tomb of the Bihać nobility (the tomb of the Croatian noblemen), the site has been designated a National Monument of Bosnia and Herzegovina.

== Third church ==
Today, Bihać is home to a third Church of St. Anthony, the parish church, which was built in 1972 by the Franciscans. It continues to serve the city's Catholic parish community. The church has an octagonal design, and its bell tower contains three bells.

In 1977, a terracotta Stations of the Cross was installed inside the church, followed later by bronze statues. During the Bosnian War, the church sustained damage.
