= Siege of Bihać =

Siege of Bihać may refer to:

- Siege of Bihać (1992–95), the siege of the city during the Bosnian War
- Siege of Bihać (1592), the siege of the city where the Ottoman Empire took control of it
- Siege of Bihać (1697), a failed Habsburg siege to take it from the Ottomans

== See also ==
- Bihać operation, the military operation from World War II in Yugoslavia
