= Studenci, Trebnje =

Studenci
- Location in Slovenia
- Coordinates: 45°53′27″N 15°04′42″E
- Country: Slovenia
- Traditional region: Lower Carniola
- Statistical region: Southeast Slovenia
- Municipality: Trebnje
- Elevation: 370 m (1,210 ft)

Studenci (pronounced [stuˈdɛːntsi], sometimes Studence) is a former village in eastern Slovenia in the Municipality of Trebnje. It is now part of the village of Dolenja Dobrava. It is part of the traditional region of Lower Carniola and is now included in the Southeast Slovenia Statistical Region.

== Geography ==
Studenci lies south of the village center of Dolenja Dobrava. Studence Hill (elevation: 405 meters or 1,329 feet) stands above the settlement to the north. It is connected by road to Jezero to the northwest and Poljane pri Mirni Peči to the east.

== Name ==
The name Studenci literally means 'springs', and it and similar forms (e.g., Studenec, Studeno) are relatively common toponyms for places in Slovenia associated with springs. It is derived from Slavic *studenьcь '(walled) spring', from the adjective *studenъ 'cold'.

== History ==
Studenci was deemed annexed by Dolenja Dobrava in 1953, ending any existence it had as a separate settlement.
