= Radio Jajce =

Bosnian radio station

- Jajce; Bosnia and Herzegovina
- Broadcast area: Central Bosnia Canton
- Frequencies: Jajce 92.0 MHz; Vinac 99.2 MHz
- Branding: Public

Programming
- Languages: Bosnian language Croatian language
- Format: Local news, talk and music

Ownership
- Owner: JP „Radio televizija Jajce“ d.o.o. Jajce

History
- First air date: 1966

Technical information
- Transmitter coordinates: 44°20′30″N 17°16′10″E
- Repeaters: Jajce/Ćusine; Vinac/Vlaček

Links
- Webcast: On website
- Website: www.radiojajce.ba

Radio Jajce is a Bosnian local public radio station, broadcasting from Jajce, Bosnia and Herzegovina.

In 1966, Radio Jajce was launched by the municipal council.

After the war in Bosnia and Herzegovina, in 1997, radio station was formally reopened by local municipal council. In Yugoslavia and in SR Bosnia and Herzegovina, it was part of local/municipal Radio Sarajevo network affiliate. This radio station broadcasts a variety of programs such as news, music, morning and talk shows. Program is mainly produced in Bosnian language and Croatian language.

The estimated number of potential listeners of Radio Jajce is around 24,486.

== Frequencies ==
- Jajce 92.0 MHz
- Vinac 99.2 MHz

== See also ==
- List of radio stations in Bosnia and Herzegovina
