= Jezero =

Jezero (Serbo-Croatian pronunciation: [jêzero]), meaning 'lake' in several Slavic languages, may refer to:

== Places ==
=== Earth ===
==== Bosnia and Herzegovina ====
- Jezero, Bosnia and Herzegovina
- Jezero, Bihać
- Jezero, Kakanj
- Jezero, Kalinovik
- Jezero, Konjic

==== Croatia ====
- Jezero, Karlovac County, a village near Plaški
- Jezero, Požega-Slavonia County, a village near Čaglin
- Jezero Klanječko, a village near Klanjec
- Jezero Posavsko, a village near Martinska Ves

==== Serbia ====
- Jezero (Despotovac)
- Jezero, Sjenica
- Jezero, Sokobanja

==== Slovenia ====
- Jezero, Brezovica
- Jezero, Trebnje

=== Mars ===
- Jezero (crater)

== Football clubs ==
- FK Jezero, a Montenegrin football club
- NK Jezero Medvode, a Slovenian football club

== See also ==
- Jezera (disambiguation)
- Jezioro (disambiguation), Polish cognate
