= Jajce =

Jajce Јајце
- Town and municipality
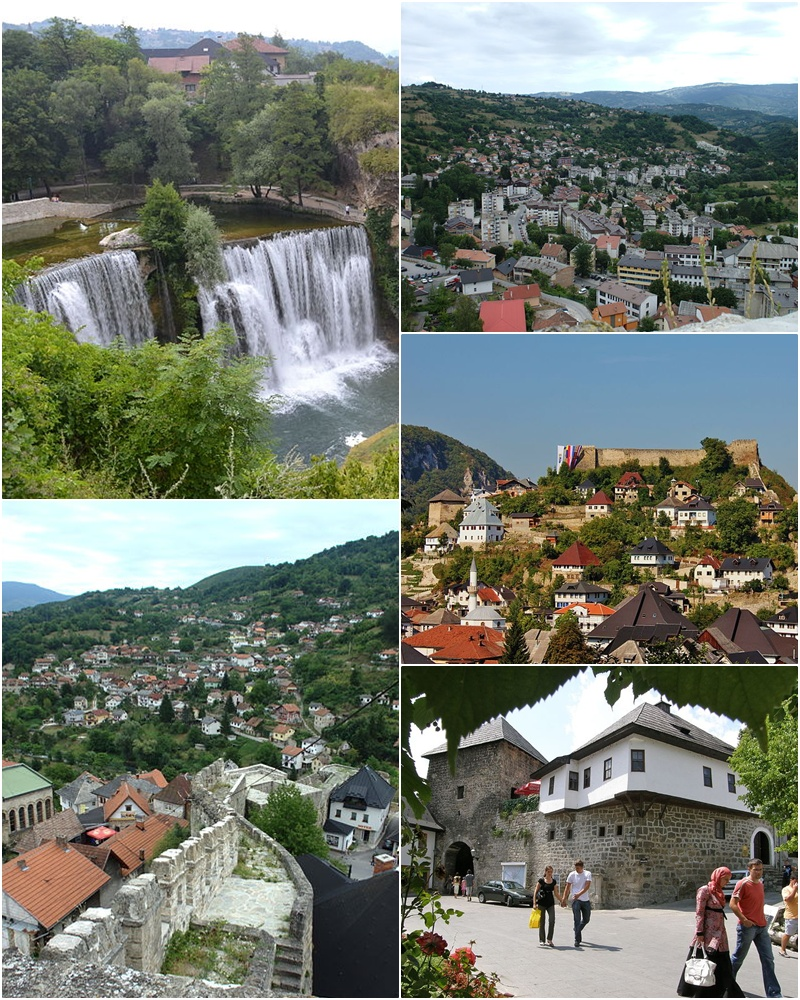
- Clockwise from top: The Pliva Waterfall, Panoramic view of eastern Maršala Tita area from Jajce Fortress, Jajce Fortress and ancient area, Meadow Gate and Omer Bey's native house and the view of Šejh Mustafe area.

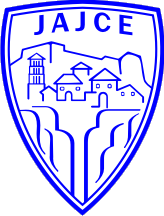
- Seal

- Location of Jajce within Bosnia and Herzegovina
- Coordinates: 44°20′30″N 17°16′10″E
- Country: Bosnia and Herzegovina
- Entity: Federation of Bosnia and Herzegovina
- Canton: Central Bosnia

Government
  - Municipal mayor: Edin Hozan (SDA)

Area
  - Municipality: 342.46 km^{2} (132.22 sq mi)

Population (2013)
  - Municipality: 27,258
  - Density: 79.595/km^{2} (206.15/sq mi)
  - Urban: 7,172
- Time zone: UTC+1 (CET)
  - Summer (DST): UTC+2 (CEST)
- Area code: +387 30
- Website: www.opcina-jajce.ba

Jajce (Serbian Cyrillic: Јајце) is a town and municipality in the Central Bosnia Canton of the Federation of Bosnia and Herzegovina, an entity of Bosnia and Herzegovina. According to the 2013 census, the town has a population of 7,172 inhabitants, with 27,258 inhabitants in the municipality, It is situated in the region of Bosanska Krajina, on the crossroads between Banja Luka, Mrkonjić Grad, and Donji Vakuf, and on the confluence of the rivers Pliva and Vrbas.

== History ==
=== Ancient times ===
Jajce Mithraeum is a temple dedicated to the God of the Sun, Mithra. The god was worshiped and the cult spread to other parts of the Roman Empire throughout the Mediterranean basin by slaves and merchants from the Orient, and by Roman soldiers who came into contact with the followers of the cult in the East. The temple is dated to the 2nd century AD and was renovated sometime during the 4th century AD. This particular Mithraeum is renowned as one of the best preserved in Europe. It was discovered accidentally during the construction of a private house. The temple is protected by glass walls so that visitors can see inside even without entering the facility. However, for entry and a closer look, visitors need to give notice of their visit in advance by contacting the Ethnological Museum of Jajce.

The Jajce Mithraeum has been declared a National Monument of Bosnia and Herzegovina.

=== Bosnian Kingdom ===
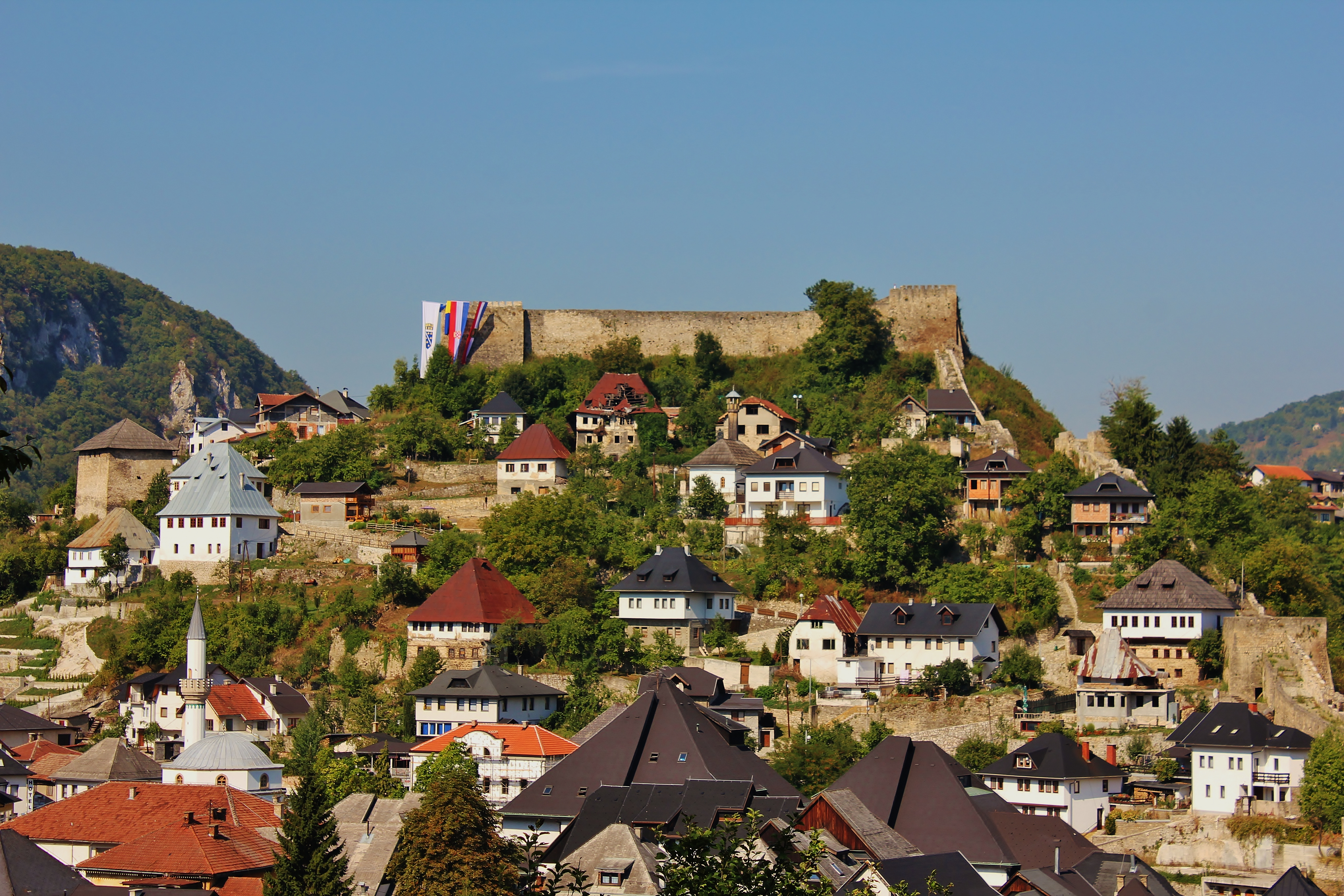
Citadel above Walled town of Jajce

Hrvoje Vukčić Hrvatinić, at the height of his power, founded the town of Jajce, and built a fortress on the site of an earlier fort. It is assumed that one of the locations of his death could be Jajce, where he built his tomb, known as the Catacombs of Jajce. However, another location of his burial is possibly believed to be Zgošća near Kakanj, where the Zgošća Stećak, a burial megalith, had been found.

Jajce was first built in the 14th century and served as the capital of the independent Kingdom of Bosnia during its time. The first references to the name of Jajce in written sources is from the year 1396, but the fortress already existed before this. The town has gates as fortifications, as well as a castle with walls which lead to the various gates around the town. About 10–20 kilometres from Jajce lies the Komotin Castle and town area which is older but smaller than Jajce. It is believed the town of Jajce was established after Komotin was struck by the Black Death.

=== Banate of Jajce ===
Jajce was the final residence of the last Bosnian king Stjepan Tomašević where he received the royal crown from Pope Pius II as "by grace of God, the King of Serbs, Bosnia, Littoral, Hum, Dalmatia, Croats, etc.". The king was slain in the town after the Ottoman conquests.

The Ottomans besieged the town and executed Tomašević in 1463, but held it only for six months. What was left of the Kingdom of Bosnia was annexed by the Kingdom of Hungary, who looked to seize the opportunity to hinder the Ottoman expansion in the Balkans. With the Bosnian King's death, an opportunity arose for the Hungarian King Matthias Corvinus to try and capture Bosnia before the Ottomans, which consequentially lead to the Siege of Jajce and suppression of the Ottoman forces' advancement. This derailed Ottoman plans for nearly half a century.

Later in the year 1463, king Matthias Corvinus established the Banate of Jajce.

Before her death in 1478 Queen Catherine restored the Saint Mary's Church in Jajce, nowadays the oldest church in the town.

Skenderbeg Mihajlović besieged Jajce again in 1501, which, although the siege was unsuccessful, marked the approaching demise of the town and the Hungarian rule in Bosnia. Mihajlović was repelled by Ivaniš Korvin, who was assisted by the Zrinski, Frankopan, Karlović and Cubor families.in 1520 Petar Keglević became the Ban of Jajce.

==== Jajce inscriptions ====
In 1866, a Glagolitic inscription was discovered on the road from Jajce to Brod with the text "ⰂⰀ ⰂⰓⰋⰮⰅ ⰖⰈⰮⰑⰆⰐⰑⰃ ⰍⰐⰅⰈⰀ ⰗⰅⰓⰅⰐⰜⰀ ⰁⰅⰓⰋⰔⰀⰎⰋⰛⰀ", "In the time of knez Ferenac Berisalić", referring to Franjo Berislavić who, on his mother's side, was related to the Berislavić family of Grabarje, who was Ban of Jajce on multiple occasions around the turn of the 16th century. Its discovery was first published in 1885 by Mile Magdić or possibly earlier, but was little known except to historians of that family such as Josip Koprivčević, because Jajce was so far away from where most Glagolitic inscriptions were made. It has appeared in several lists of Glagolitic inscriptions complied by Darko Žubrinić, but the inscription itself is thought to have been lost. According to Stjepan Damjanović, another Glagolitic inscription was discovered in Jajce in 1996.

=== Ottoman period ===
In 1527, Jajce fell to the Ottomans. Under the Ottomans, the town lost its strategic importance, as the border moved further north.

There are several churches and mosques built at different times during different reigns, making Jajce a rather diverse town in this aspect.

=== Austria-Hungary period ===
Jajce was ruled together with the rest of Bosnia and Herzegovina under the administration of Austria-Hungary from 1878 to 1918. The Franciscan monastery of Saint Luke was completed in 1885.

=== World War II ===
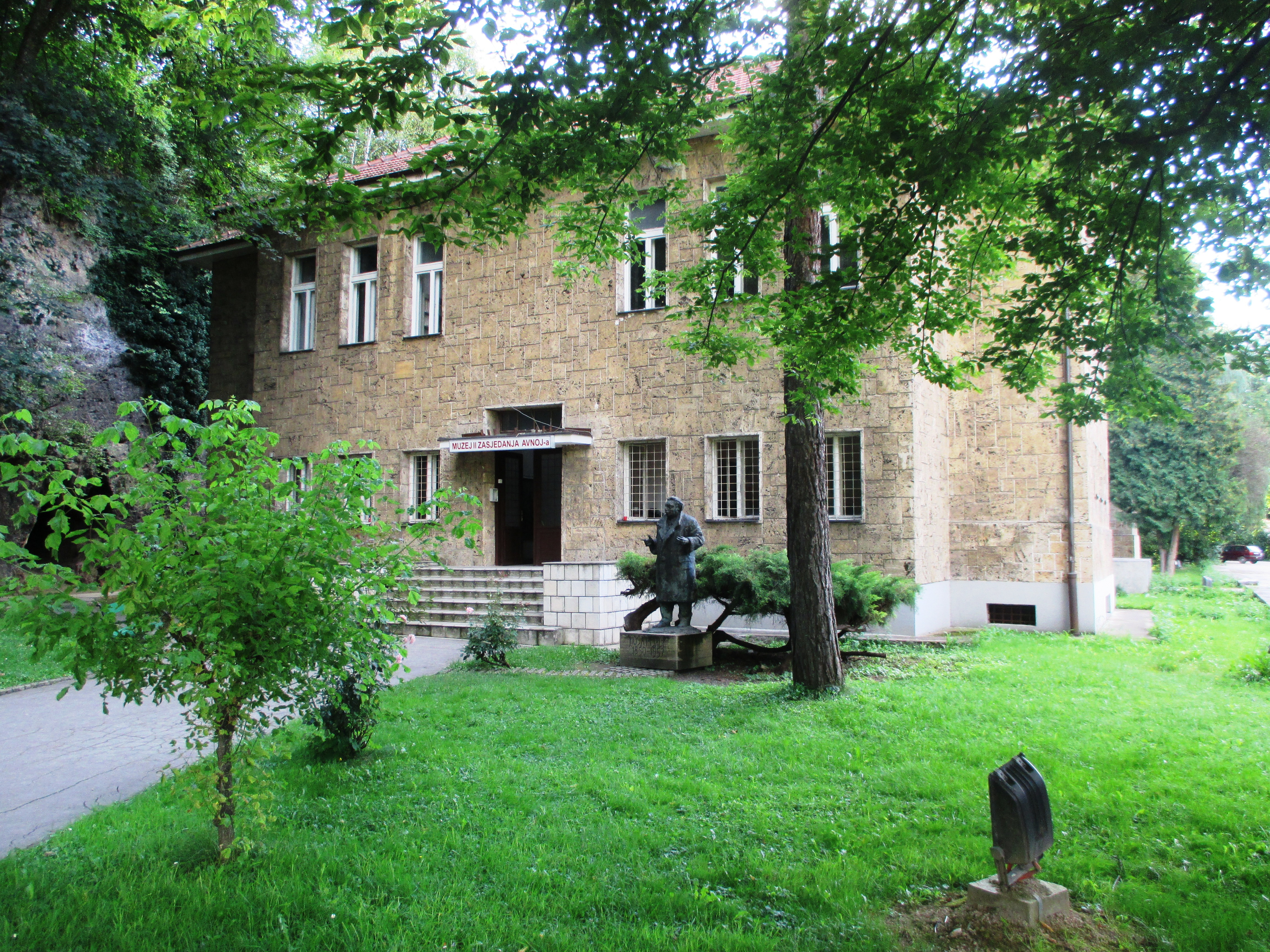
The AVNOJ Museum in Jajce (built in 1934 by architect Momir Korunović)

From 1929 to 1941, Jajce was part of the Vrbas Banovina of the Kingdom of Yugoslavia. During the Second World War, Jajce gained importance as centre of a large swath of free territory, and on 29 November 1943 it hosted the second convention of the Anti-Fascist Council of National Liberation of Yugoslavia (AVNOJ). There, in the Sokol building built in 1934 by Momir Korunović, representatives from throughout Yugoslavia decided to establish a federal Yugoslavia, one that would have equality between its ethnic groups, and established that Bosnia and Herzegovina would be one of its constitutive republics. The post-war economy of Jajce in socialist times was based on industry and tourism.

=== Bosnian War ===
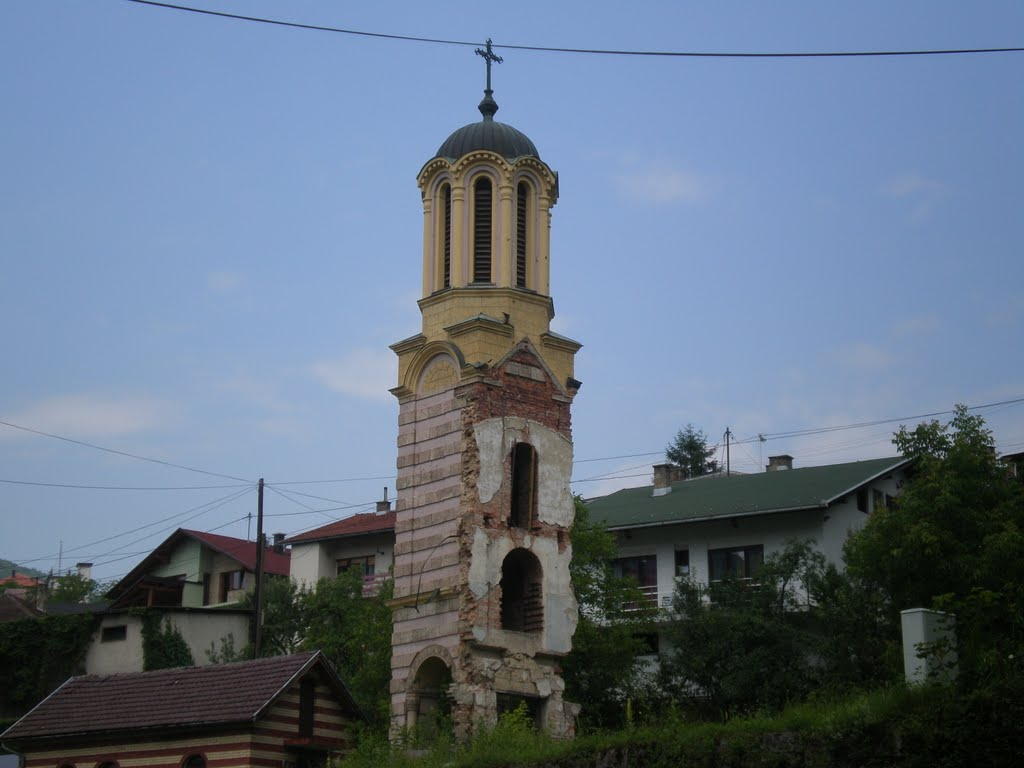
The ruins of the Orthodox church in Jajce

At the beginning of the Bosnian War, Jajce was inhabited by people from all ethnic groups, and was situated at a junction between areas of the Bosnian Serb majority to the north, Bosniak majority areas to the southeast and Bosnian Croat majority areas to the southwest.

At the end of April and the beginning of May 1992, almost all ethnic Serbs fled or were expelled to the territory under Republika Srpska control. In the summer of 1992, the Army of Republika Srpska (VRS) started heavy bombardment of the town. Jajce was defended by Croat (HVO) and Bosniak (ARBiH) forces with two separate command lines, but fell to Serb forces on 29 October. Retreating forces were joined by a column of 30,000 to 40,000 civilian refugees, stretching 16 kilometres (10 miles) towards Travnik, under VRS sniping and shelling. Shrader defined it as "the largest and most wretched single exodus" of the Bosnian War.

Bosniak refugees resettled in Central Bosnia, while Croats moved either to Croatia or closer to the Croatian border due to rising tensions. By November 1992 the pre-war population of Jajce had shrunk from 45,000 to just several thousand.

In the following weeks, all mosques and Catholic churches in Jajce were demolished. It is presumed that the Orthodox church was demolished on 10–11 October by members of the so-called "Krajina Brigade" within the Army of BiH. The VRS converted the town's Franciscan monastery into a prison and its archives, museum collections and artworks were looted; the monastery church was completely destroyed. By 1992, all religious buildings in Jajce had been destroyed, except for two mosques whose perilous positioning on a hilltop had made them unsuitable for demolition.

Jajce was re-captured together with Bosanski Petrovac in mid-September 1995 during Operation Mistral 2 by the Croatian Defence Council (HVO), after VRS forces had evacuated the Serb population. Jajce became part of the Federation of Bosnia and Herzegovina according to the Dayton Agreement. Returning Bosniaks were at first blocked by a mob of Croats in early August 1996, which according to US diplomat Robert Gelbard was personally led by convicted Bosnian Croat war criminal Dario Kordić. Bosniak refugees were able to return peacefully only a few weeks later, being accompanied by many more. Dario Kordić surrendered and was flown to the Hague following political pressure on Zagreb, particularly by the United States.

A significant number of Serb refugees settled in Brčko while the rest settled in Mrkonjić Grad, Šipovo, and Banja Luka.

== Economy and tourism ==
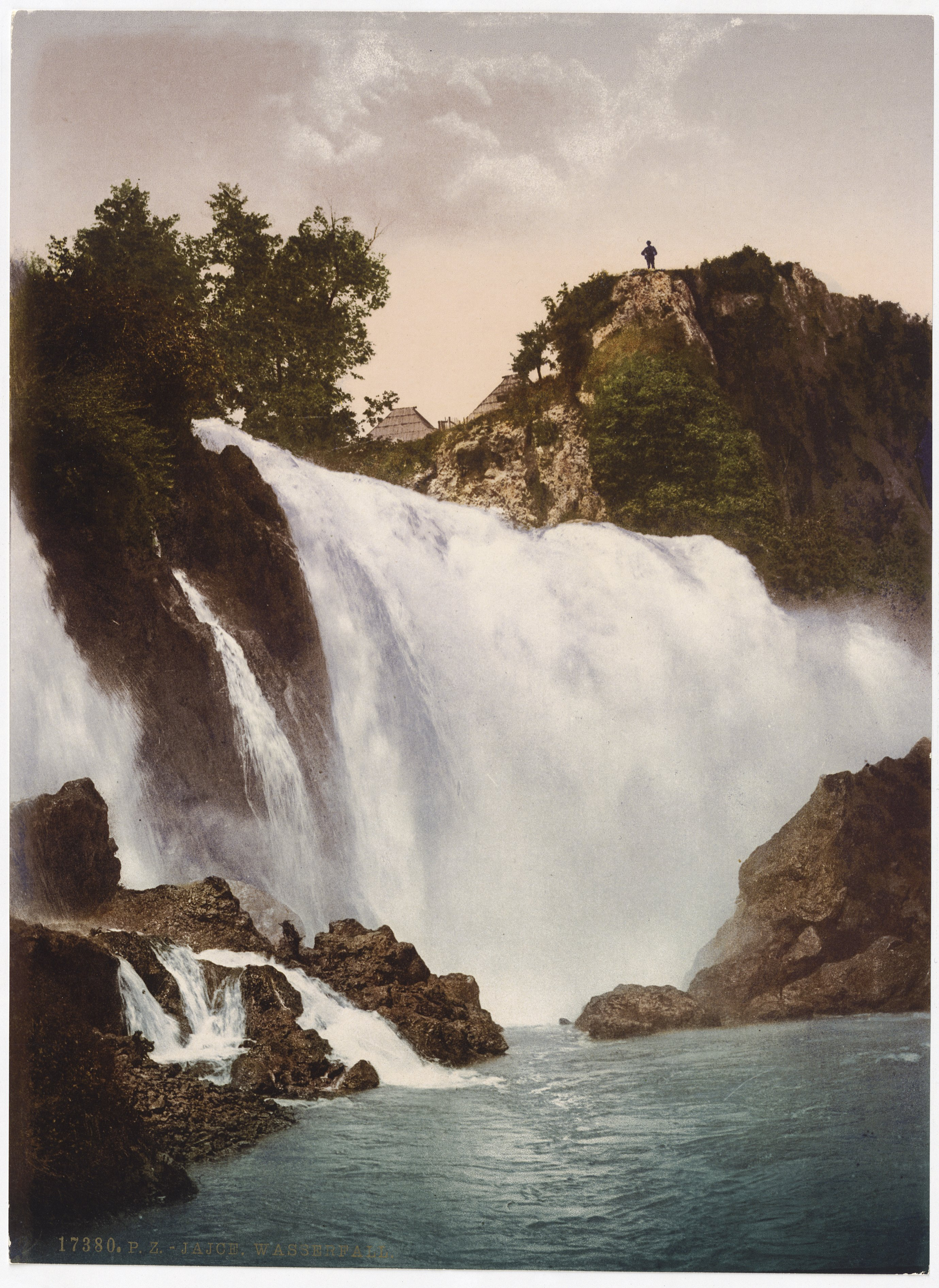
Waterfall, 1901

=== National Monument and UNESCO Tentative List ===
The economy of the Jajce municipality is nowadays weak. UNESCO, with a Swedish organisation Kulturarv utan gränser (transl. Cultural Heritage without Borders), initiated a project of the renovation of the historical core of the town. The main project of the company was to renovate old traditional houses which symbolize the panoramic view of the town with the waterfall. As of 2006, most of the houses were rebuilt.

The old Jajce walled city core, including the waterfall, and other individual sites outside the walled city perimeter, such as the Jajce Mithraeum, is designated as The Natural and Architectural Ensemble of Jajce and proposed for the inscription into the UNESCO's World Heritage Site list. The bid for the inscription is currently placed on the UNESCO Tentative list.

=== Tourism ===
Jajce was a popular tourist destination in Yugoslav times, mostly due to the historical importance of the AVNOJ session. Tourism has restarted, and its numbers (20–55,000 tourists in 2012–2013) are relevant in relation to the municipality's population (25,000). Tourists from across the former Yugoslavia still make up most of the visitors to Jajce, but Middle Eastern tourists have also increased since the early 2000s. Organised school trips also make up a significant portion of tourists. Spring and autumn are the main tourist seasons.

The town is famous for its 22-metre (72 ft) high waterfall where the Pliva River meets the river Vrbas. It was damaged during the Bosnian War by high waters and severe flooding, as the area of the Jajce-1 Hydroelectric Power Station was at the battlefront and out of service; the sudden rise in water levels and discharge created a tidal wave which damaged the travertine body of the waterfall.

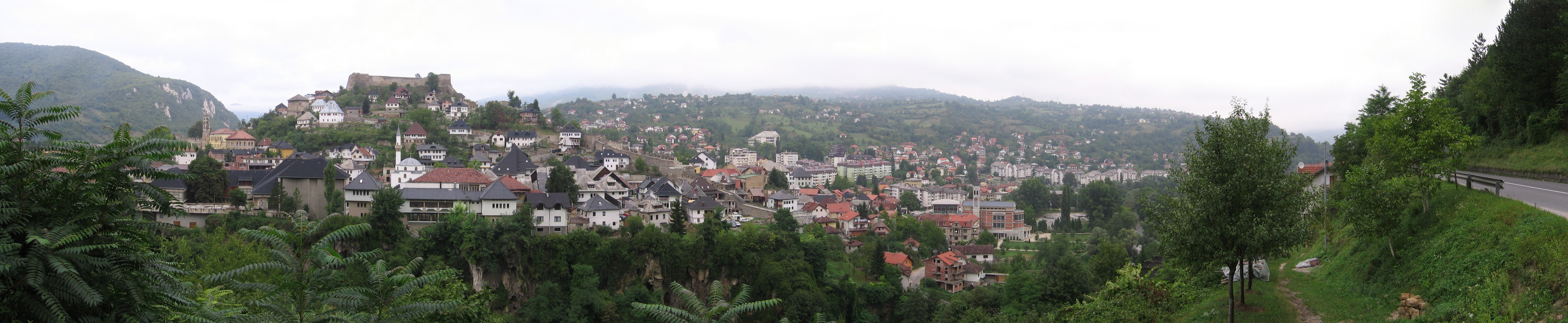
Panorama of Jajce

== Demographics ==
In 1931 the municipality of Jajce was part of the much bigger Jajce County (together with today's municipalities of Jezero, Dobretići and Šipovo).

=== Population ===
Population of settlements – Jajce municipality
	Settlement	1931	1948	1953	1961	1971	1981	1991	2013
	Total	48,510			34,488	35,002	41,197	45,007	30,758
1	Bare							225	252
2	Barevo							1,616	680
3	Biokovina							512	225
4	Bistrica							1,236	909
5	Bravnice							868	323
6	Bučići							457	458
7	Bulići							1,400	1,014
8	Carevo Polje							1,875	1,189
9	Divičani							1,257	1,065
10	Donji Bešpelj							834	536
11	Doribaba							651	588
12	Gornji Bešpelj							783	310
13	Ipota							372	310
14	Jajce				6,853	9,127	11,918	13,579	7,172
15	Kasumi							319	219
16	Klimenta							411	447
17	Kruščica							913	685
18	Kuprešani							1,106	770
19	Lendići							703	621
20	Lupnica							1,064	817
21	Mile							1,270	1,056
22	Peratovci							372	331
23	Podmilačje							674	430
24	Prudi							614	420
25	Pšenik							411	328
26	Rika							901	376
27	Seoci							423	250
28	Šibenica							925	861
29	Smionica							470	271
30	Vinac							1,341	1,085
31	Vlasinje							1,133	845
32	Vrbica							652	602
33	Vukičevci							475	271

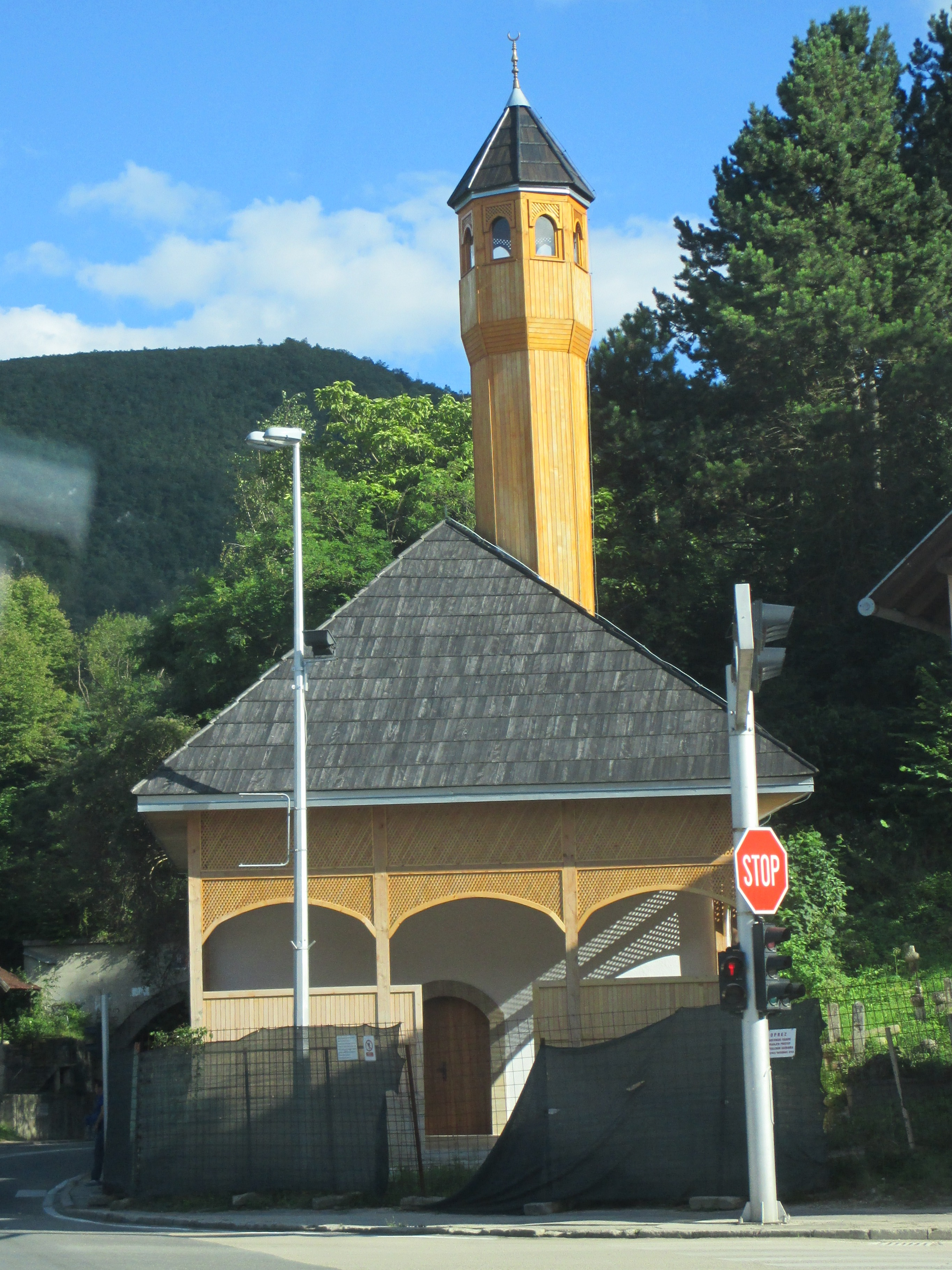
Bosnian-style wooden mosque (Ramadan begova džamija), reconstructed

=== Ethnic composition ===
Ethnic composition – Jajce town
	2013	1991	1981	1971
Total	7,172 (100,0%)	13,579 (100,0%)	11,918 (100,0%)	9,127 (100,0%)
Croats	3,273 (45,64%)	1,899 (13,98%)	1,991 (16,71%)	2,148 (23,53%)
Bosniaks	3,267 (45,55%)	5,277 (38,86%)	4,068 (34,13%)	4,220 (46,24%)
Others	435 (6,065%)	389 (2,865%)	80 (0,671%)	101 (1,107%)
Serbs	197 (2,747%)	3,797 (27,96%)	3,046 (25,56%)	2,403 (26,33%)
Yugoslavs		2,217 (16,33%)	2,632 (22,08%)	184 (2,016%)
Montenegrins			58 (0,487%)	38 (0,416%)
Albanians			22 (0,185%)	15 (0,164%)
Macedonians			8 (0,067%)	3 (0,033%)
Slovenes			6 (0,050%)	12 (0,131%)
Hungarians			6 (0,050%)	3 (0,033%)
Roma			1 (0,008%)	

Ethnic composition – Jajce municipality
	2013	1991	1981	1971	1961	1931
Total	30,758 (100,0%)	45,007 (100,0%)	41,197 (100,0%)	35,002 (100,0%)	34,488 (100,0%)	48,510 (100,0%)
Bosniaks (Note: "Muslims" in the 1931 census)	13,269 (48,68%)	17,380 (38,62%)	15,145 (36,76%)	14,001 (40,00%)	7,545 (21,88%)	14,205 (29,28%)
Croats	12,555 (46,06%)	15,811 (35,13%)	14,418 (35,00%)	12,376 (35,36%)	13,733 (39,82%)	10,080 (20,78%)
Others	933 (3,423%)	657 (1,460%)	375 (0,910%)	192 (0,549%)	198 (0,57%)	
Serbs	501 (1,838%)	8,663 (19,25%)	7,954 (19,31%)	8,132 (23,23%)	8,670 (25,14%)	24,176 (49,84%)
Yugoslavs		2,496 (5,546%)	3,177 (7,712%)	208 (0,594%)	4,342 (12,59%)	
Montenegrins			72 (0,175%)	47 (0,134%)		
Albanians			32 (0,078%)	15 (0,043%)		
Macedonians			10 (0,024%)	3 (0,009%)		
Slovenes			7 (0,017%)	18 (0,051%)		
Hungarians			6 (0,015%)	4 (0,011%)		
Roma			1 (0,002%)	6 (0,017%)		

== Climate ==
Climate data for Jajce (1961–1990)
Month	Jan	Feb	Mar	Apr	May	Jun	Jul	Aug	Sep	Oct	Nov	Dec	Year
Record high °C (°F)	16.6 (61.9)	21.4 (70.5)	26.6 (79.9)	29.4 (84.9)	33.4 (92.1)	34.6 (94.3)	37.6 (99.7)	37.0 (98.6)	37.0 (98.6)	29.4 (84.9)	23.2 (73.8)	19.8 (67.6)	37.6 (99.7)
Mean daily maximum °C (°F)	3.1 (37.6)	6.4 (43.5)	11.1 (52.0)	16.0 (60.8)	21.0 (69.8)	23.9 (75.0)	26.3 (79.3)	26.2 (79.2)	22.7 (72.9)	17.3 (63.1)	10.6 (51.1)	4.2 (39.6)	15.7 (60.3)
Daily mean °C (°F)	−0.8 (30.6)	1.8 (35.2)	5.5 (41.9)	10.1 (50.2)	14.5 (58.1)	17.4 (63.3)	19.2 (66.6)	18.7 (65.7)	15.4 (59.7)	10.8 (51.4)	5.7 (42.3)	0.7 (33.3)	9.9 (49.8)
Mean daily minimum °C (°F)	−4.7 (23.5)	−2.6 (27.3)	0.1 (32.2)	4.1 (39.4)	8.2 (46.8)	11.4 (52.5)	12.5 (54.5)	12.4 (54.3)	9.9 (49.8)	5.7 (42.3)	1.2 (34.2)	−2.9 (26.8)	4.6 (40.3)
Record low °C (°F)	−25.4 (−13.7)	−18.6 (−1.5)	−15.2 (4.6)	−4.4 (24.1)	−1.5 (29.3)	1.2 (34.2)	5.4 (41.7)	4.8 (40.6)	−2.0 (28.4)	−5.8 (21.6)	−14.8 (5.4)	−18.8 (−1.8)	−25.4 (−13.7)
Average precipitation mm (inches)	60.2 (2.37)	61.3 (2.41)	65.7 (2.59)	70.3 (2.77)	87.4 (3.44)	96.5 (3.80)	81.8 (3.22)	77.9 (3.07)	74.8 (2.94)	68.4 (2.69)	91.5 (3.60)	80.5 (3.17)	916.2 (36.07)
Average precipitation days (≥ 0.1 mm)	12.0	11.3	13.0	13.7	14.5	14.4	10.0	10.0	10.1	9.6	11.5	12.8	143.1
Average snowy days (≥ 1.0 cm)	15.4	11.5	4.0	0.5	0.0	0.0	0.0	0.0	0.0	0.0	3.5	11.5	46.4
Average relative humidity (%)	82.7	79.4	75.1	72.3	75.2	76.9	75.8	76.8	78.8	80.2	81.9	84.4	78.3
Mean monthly sunshine hours	52.5	71.1	115.3	147.7	180.7	197.3	243.8	221.2	165.6	120.5	72.0	44.2	1,631.9
Source: Meteorological Institute of Bosnia and Herzegovina

== Settlements ==
- Bare
- Barevo
- Bavar
- Biokovina
- Bistrica
- Borci
- Božikovac
- Bravnice
- Brvanci
- Bučići
- Bulići
- Carevo Polje
- Cvitović
- Čerkazovići
- Ćusine
- Divičani
- Dogani
- Donji Bešpelj
- Doribaba
- Drenov Do
- Dubrave
- Đumezlije
- Gornji Bešpelj
- Grabanta
- Grdovo
- Ipota
- Jajce
- Jezero
- Kamenice
- Karići
- Kasumi
- Klimenta
- Kokići
- Kovačevac
- Krezluk
- Kruščica
- Kuprešani
- Lendići
- Lučina
- Lupnica
- Ljoljići
- Magarovci
- Mile
- Peratovci
- Perućica
- Podlipci
- Podmilačje
- Prisoje
- Prudi
- Pšenik
- Rika
- Selište
- Seoci
- Smionica
- Stare Kuće
- Šerići
- Šibenica
- Vinac
- Vrbica
- Vukićevci
- Zastinje
- Zdaljevac
- Žaovine

== Notable people ==
- Pero Šimleša (1910–1988), pedagogue from Ljuša
- Dubravko Lovrenović, medievalist and author
- Mato Jajalo (born 1988), footballer
- Marin Leovac (born 1988), footballer
- Irfan Škiljan (born 1973), computer scientist, author of the IrfanView program
- Mara Jelica (born 1974), chess player

== Twin towns – sister cities ==
Jajce is twinned with:

- Alaçatı (Çeşme), Turkey
- Hallsberg, Sweden
- Kutná Hora, Czech Republic
- Ottensheim, Austria
- Piacenza, Italy
- Szekszárd, Hungary
- Tomislavgrad, Bosnia and Herzegovina
- Virovitica, Croatia
- Zenica, Bosnia and Herzegovina

== Bibliography ==
- Damjanović, Stjepan (2004). "Glagoljica na području današnje Bosne i Hercegovine". Zagreb: Udruga đaka Franjevačke klasične gimnazije (in Serbo-Croatian). Visoko. pp. 73–88.
- Karbić, Marija (2006). "Hrvatsko plemstvo u borbi protiv Osmanlija. Primjer obitelji Berislavića Grabarskih iz Slavonije" [The Croatian nobility in the fight against the Ottomans. The Example of the Berislavić Grabarski family of Slavonija]. Povijesni prilozi (in Serbo-Croatian). 31: 71–85.
- Koprivčević, Josip (1943). "Berislavići Grabarski kao feudalni gospodari Broda i Posavine XII.-XIII. vieka" [The Berislavić Grabarski family as feudal lords of Brod and Posavina in the XII-XIII centuries]. Prilozi za poznavanje Broda (in Serbo-Croatian). 1: 12–21.
- Magdić, Mile (1884). "Prilozi za poviest starih plemićkih porodica senjskih (Homolića, Miletića, Moletića i Kuhačevića, Vukasovića, Daničića, Novakovića" [Contributions to the history of the old noble families of Senj (Homolić, Miletić, Moletić and Kuhačević, Vukasović, Daničić, Novaković)]. Starine Jugoslavenske akademije znanosti i umjetnosti (in Serbo-Croatian). 17: 51–74.
- Mesić, Matija (1869). "Pleme Berislavića" [The Berislavić noble family]. Rad Jugoslavenske akademije znanosti i umjetnosti (in Serbo-Croatian). 8: 30–104. ISSN 0375-1015.
- Žubrinić, Darko (1995a). "Kronološki popis najvažnijih glagoljičkih spomenika" [Chronological list of the most important Glagolitic monuments] (in Serbo-Croatian).
- Žubrinić, Darko (1995b). "Croatian Glagolitic Manuscripts kept outside of Croatia".
- Žubrinić, Darko (2017). "Hrvatski glagoljički nadpisi odkriveni nakon 1982. (Prvi dio)" [Croatian Glagolitic inscriptions discovered after 1982 (First part)] (in Serbo-Croatian).
- Žubrinić, Darko (2001). "Hrvatski glagoljički rukopisi izvan domovine". Croatian History (in Serbo-Croatian).
