= Prisoje, Jezero =

Prisoje
- Village
- Location within Bosnia and Herzegovina
- Country: Bosnia and Herzegovina
- Entity: Republika Srpska; Federation of Bosnia and Herzegovina
- Region Canton: Banja Luka; Central Bosnia
- Municipality: Jezero; Jajce

Area
  - Total: 1.67 sq mi (4.33 km^{2})

Population (2013)
  - Total: 145
  - Density: 86.7/sq mi (33.5/km^{2})
- Time zone: UTC+1 (CET)
  - Summer (DST): UTC+2 (CEST)

Prisoje is a village in the municipalities of Jezero, Republika Srpska and Jajce, Bosnia and Herzegovina.

== Demographics ==
According to the 2013 census, its population was 145, with 106 Serbs living in the Jezero part and the rest living in the Jajce part.

Ethnicity in 2013
Ethnicity	Number	Percentage
Serbs	129	89.0%
Croats	10	6.9%
Bosniaks	6	4.1%
Total	145	100%
