= Borci, Jezero =

Borci Борци
- Village
- Location within Bosnia and Herzegovina
- Country: Bosnia and Herzegovina
- Entity: Republika Srpska; Federation of Bosnia and Herzegovina
- Canton: Central Bosnia
- Municipality: Jezero; Jajce

Area
  - Total: 3.23 sq mi (8.36 km^{2})

Population (2013)
  - Total: 19
  - Density: 5.9/sq mi (2.3/km^{2})
- Time zone: UTC+1 (CET)
  - Summer (DST): UTC+2 (CEST)

Borci (Serbian Cyrillic: Борци) is a village in the municipalities of Jezero, Republika Srpska and Jajce, Bosnia and Herzegovina.

== Demographics ==
According to the 2013 census, its population was 19, all Serbs living in the Jezero part with no one living in the Jajce part.
