= Drenov Do =

Drenov Do Дренов До
- Village
- Location within Bosnia and Herzegovina
- Coordinates: 44°18′47″N 17°13′09″E
- Country: Bosnia and Herzegovina
- Entity: Republika Srpska; Federation of Bosnia and Herzegovina
- Canton: Central Bosnia
- Municipality: Jezero; Jajce

Area
  - Total: 4.99 sq mi (12.92 km^{2})

Population (2013)
  - Total: 28
  - Density: 5.6/sq mi (2.2/km^{2})
- Time zone: UTC+1 (CET)
  - Summer (DST): UTC+2 (CEST)

Drenov Do (Serbian Cyrillic: Дренов До) is a village in the municipalities of Jezero, Republika Srpska and Jajce, Bosnia and Herzegovina.

== Demographics ==
According to the 2013 census, its population was 28, all Serbs with 3 of them living in the Jezero part and the rest in Jajce.
