= Ljoljići =

Ljoljići Љољићи
- Village
- Location within Bosnia and Herzegovina
- Coordinates: 44°19′N 17°09′E
- Country: Bosnia and Herzegovina
- Entity: Republika Srpska
- Municipality: Jezero
- Time zone: UTC+1 (CET)
  - Summer (DST): UTC+2 (CEST)

Ljoljići (Serbian Cyrillic: Љољићи) is a village in the municipality of Jezero, Bosnia and Herzegovina. Prior to the 1992-95 war, it lay within the municipality of Jajce.
