= Bravnice =

Bravnice Бравнице
- Village
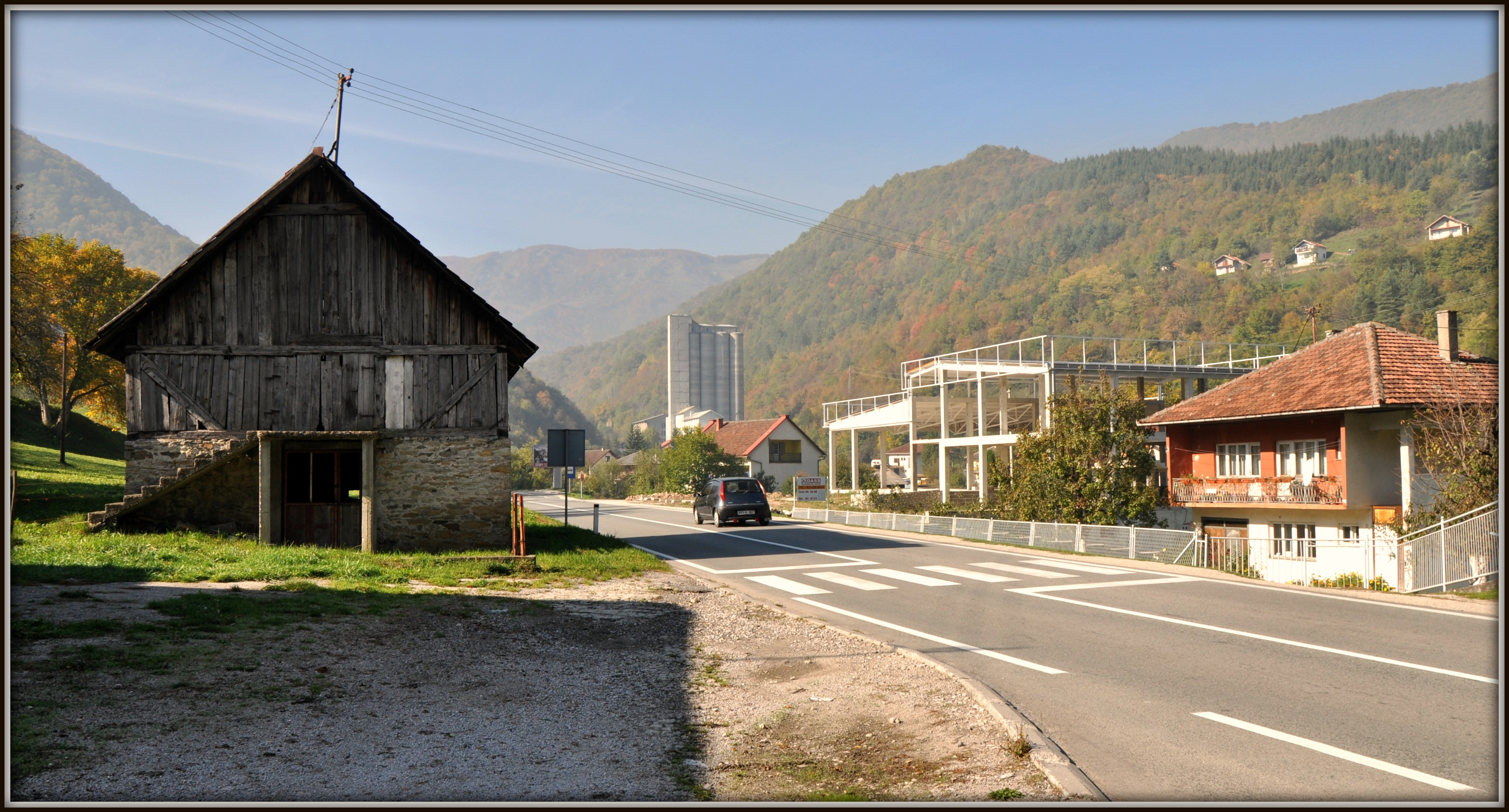

- Location within Bosnia and Herzegovina
- Coordinates: 44°19′05″N 17°14′51″E
- Country: Bosnia and Herzegovina
- Entity: Republika Srpska; Federation of Bosnia and Herzegovina
- Canton: Central Bosnia
- Municipality: Jezero; Jajce

Area
  - Total: 11.26 sq mi (29.17 km^{2})

Population (2013)
  - Total: 323
  - Density: 28.7/sq mi (11.1/km^{2})
- Time zone: UTC+1 (CET)
  - Summer (DST): UTC+2 (CEST)

Bravnice (Serbian Cyrillic: Бравнице) is a village in the municipalities of Jezero, Republika Srpska and Jajce, Bosnia and Herzegovina.

== Demographics ==
According to the 2013 census, its population was 323 with none living in the Jezero part.

Ethnicity in 2013
Ethnicity	Number	Percentage
Croats	118	36.5%
Serbs	111	34.4%
Bosniaks	89	27.6%
other/undeclared	5	1.5%
Total	323	100%
