= Studenec pri Ivančni Gorici =

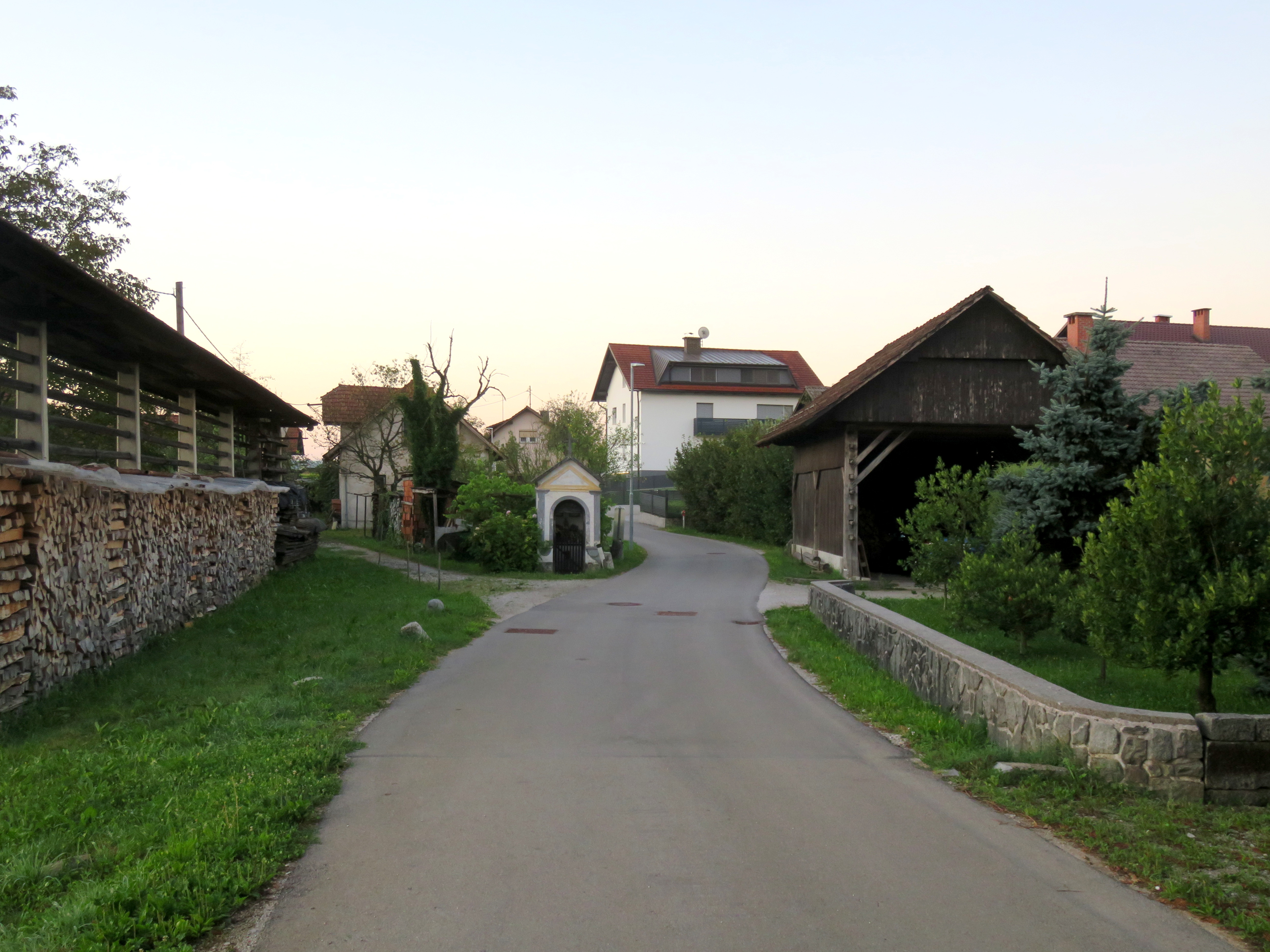

- Location in Slovenia
- Coordinates: 45°56′27″N 14°48′49″E
- Country: Slovenia
- Traditional region: Lower Carniola
- Statistical region: Central Slovenia
- Municipality: Ivančna Gorica
- Elevation: 340 m (1,120 ft)

Studenec pri Ivančni Gorici (pronounced [stuˈdɛːnəts pɾi iˈʋaːntʃni ɡɔˈɾiːtsi], German: Studenz) is a former village in central Slovenia in the Municipality of Ivančna Gorica. It is now part of the town of Ivančna Gorica. It is part of the traditional region of Lower Carniola and is now included in the Central Slovenia Statistical Region.

== Geography ==
Studenec pri Ivančni Gorici is a clustered settlement on a rise east of Ivančna Gorica. Bregar Hill (Slovene: Bregarjev hrib, elevation 341 meters or 1,119 feet) rises south of the village, and Vir Creek, an influent stream, flows below the village to the east.

== Name ==
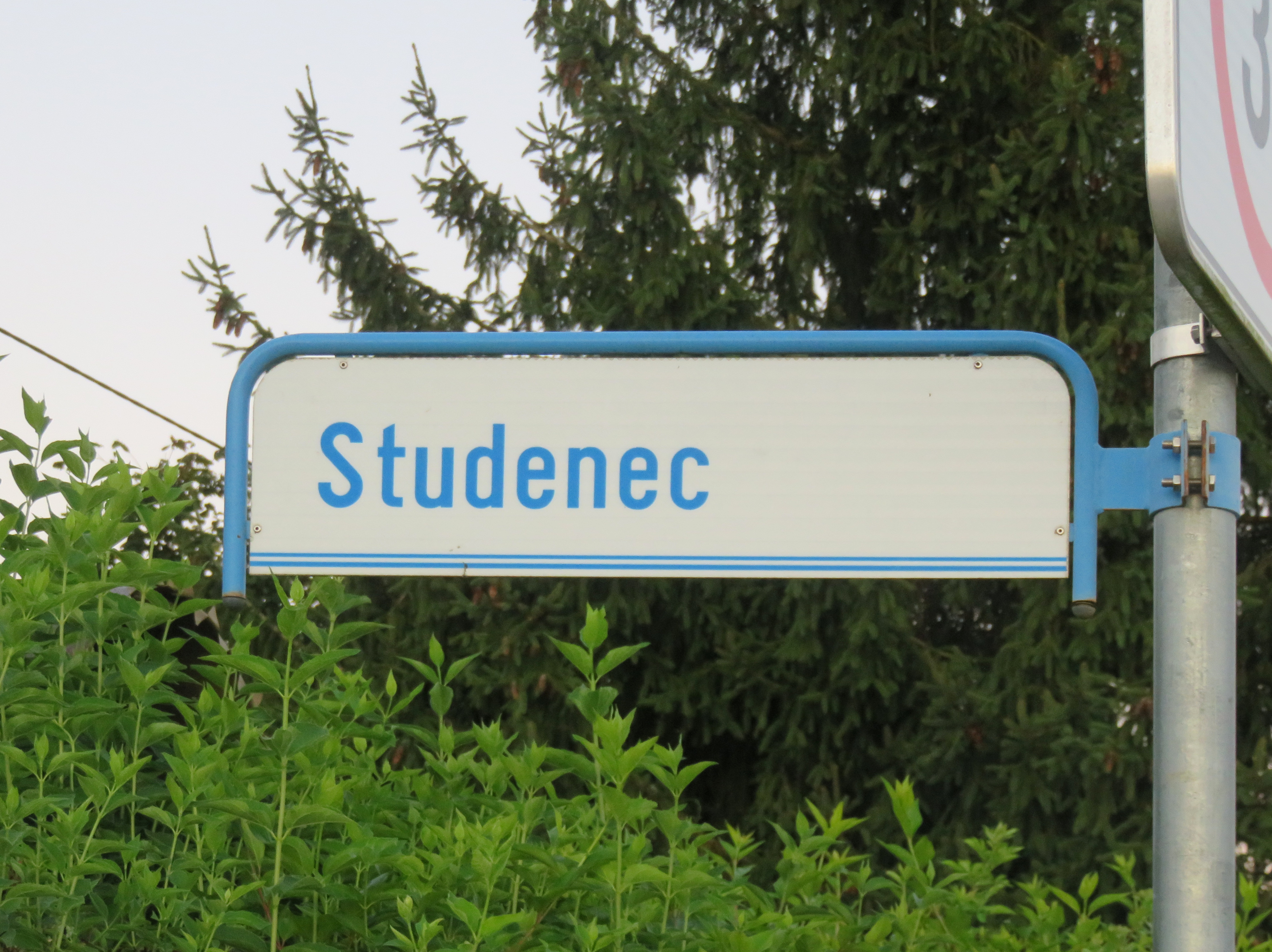
A street sign for Studenec pri Ivančni Gorici

The name Studenec means 'spring', referring to a local water source. Initially simply called Studenec, the epithet pri Ivančni Gorici 'near Ivančna Gorica' was added to the name of the village in 1955. The place name Studenec is common in Slovenia, and is it found in other Slovene toponyms, such as Studenec in the Municipality of Postojna and Studenec na Blokah.

== History ==
Illyrian burial mounds have been discovered below the village, testifying to settlement of the area in antiquity. A Roman road used to run south of the village.

Studenec pri Ivančni Gorici had a population of 51 (in seven houses) in 1880, and 35 (in eight houses) in 1900. Studenec pri Ivančni Gorici ceased to exist as a separate settlement in 1983, when it was annexed by the town of Ivančna Gorica.
