= Jezioro =

Jezioro (meaning "lake" in Polish) may refer to the following villages:

- Jezioro, Lower Silesian Voivodeship (south-west Poland)
- Jezioro, Lublin Voivodeship (east Poland)
- Jezioro, Masovian Voivodeship (east-central Poland)
- Jezioro, Silesian Voivodeship (south Poland)
- Jezioro, Warmian-Masurian Voivodeship (north Poland)

== See also ==
- Jezero (disambiguation), a cognate
