= Klimenta =

- Village
- Location within Bosnia and Herzegovina
- Country: Bosnia and Herzegovina
- Entity: Federation of Bosnia and Herzegovina
- Canton: Central Bosnia
- Municipality: Jajce

Area
  - Total: 0.32 sq mi (0.84 km^{2})

Population (2013)
  - Total: 447
  - Density: 1,400/sq mi (530/km^{2})
- Time zone: UTC+1 (CET)
  - Summer (DST): UTC+2 (CEST)

Klimenta is a village in the municipality of Jajce, Bosnia and Herzegovina.

== Demographics ==
According to the 2013 census, its population was 447.

Ethnicity in 2013
Ethnicity	Number	Percentage
Croats	364	81.4%
Bosniaks	73	16.3%
Serbs	2	0.4%
other/undeclared	8	1.8%
Total	447	100%
