= Čerkazovići =

Čerkazovići Черказовићи
- Village
- Location within Bosnia and Herzegovina
- Coordinates: 44°20′N 17°10′E
- Country: Bosnia and Herzegovina
- Entity: Republika Srpska
- Region: Banja Luka
- Municipality: Jezero

Area
  - Total: 1.49 sq mi (3.85 km^{2})

Population (2013)
  - Total: 103
  - Density: 69.3/sq mi (26.8/km^{2})
- Time zone: UTC+1 (CET)
  - Summer (DST): UTC+2 (CEST)

Čerkazovići (Serbian Cyrillic: Черказовићи) is a village in the municipality of Jezero, Bosnia and Herzegovina.

== Demographics ==
According to the 2013 census, its population was 103.

Ethnicity in 2013
Ethnicity	Number	Percentage
Serbs	83	80.6%
Bosniaks	20	19.4%
Total	103	100%
