= Šibenica =

Šibenica Шибеница
- Village
- Location within Bosnia and Herzegovina
- Coordinates: 44°19′48″N 17°19′48″E
- Country: Bosnia and Herzegovina
- Entity: Federation of Bosnia and Herzegovina
- Canton: Central Bosnia
- Municipality: Jajce

Area
  - Total: 14.56 km^{2} (5.62 sq mi)

Population (2013)
  - Total: 861
  - Density: 59.1/km^{2} (153/sq mi)
- Time zone: UTC+1 (CET)
  - Summer (DST): UTC+2 (CEST)

Šibenica (Serbian Cyrillic: Шибеница) is a village in the municipality of Jajce, Bosnia and Herzegovina.

== Demographics ==
According to the 2013 census, its population was 861.

Ethnicity in 2013
Ethnicity	Number	Percentage
Bosniaks	588	68.3%
Croats	260	30.2%
other/undeclared	13	1.5%
Total	861	100%
