= Krezluk =

Krezluk Крезлук
- Village
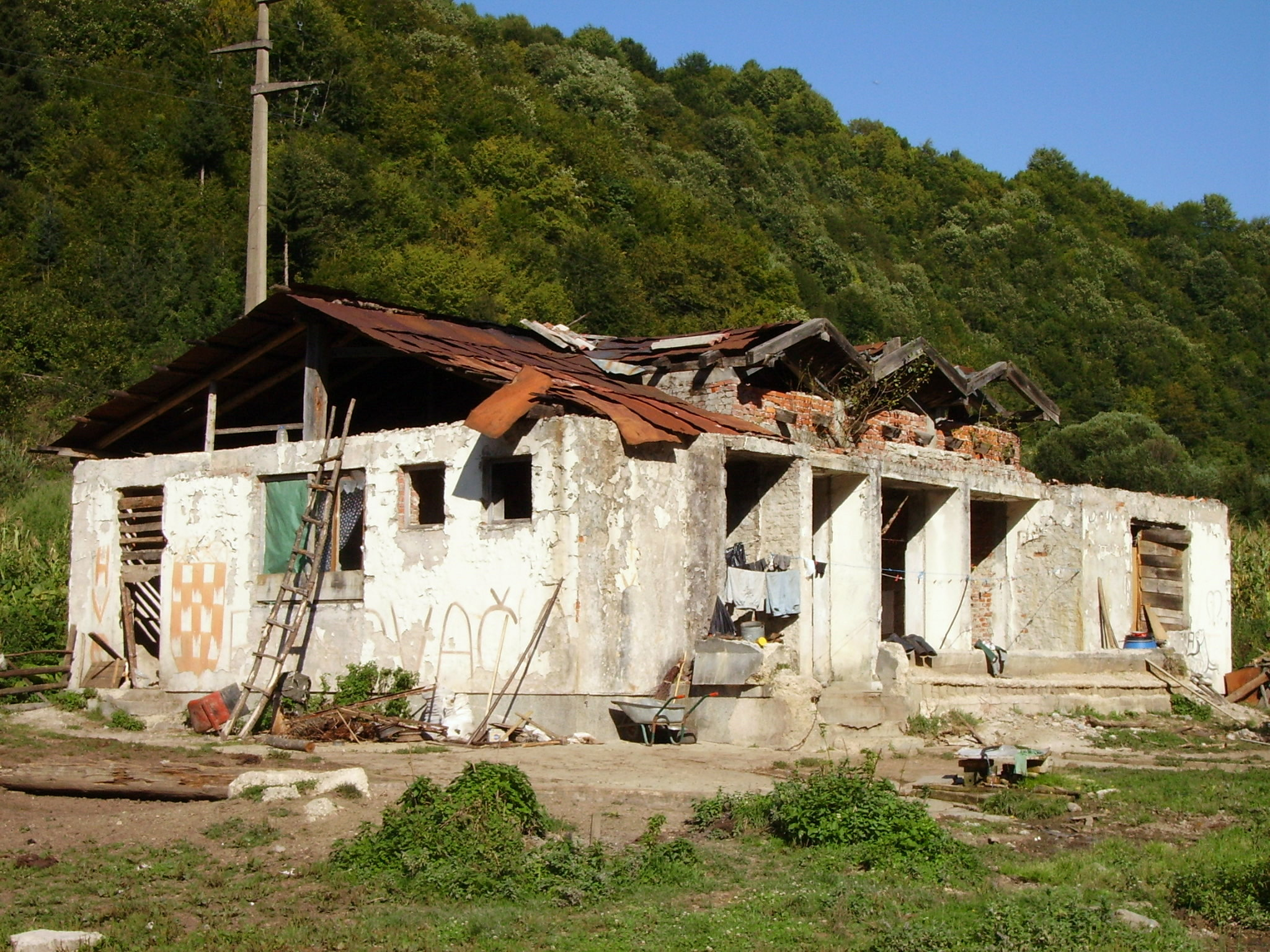

- Location within Bosnia and Herzegovina
- Coordinates: 44°17′N 17°23′E
- Country: Bosnia and Herzegovina
- Entity: Federation of Bosnia and Herzegovina
- Canton: Central Bosnia
- Municipality: Jajce

Area
  - Total: 0.78 sq mi (2.02 km^{2})

Population (2013)
  - Total: 0
  - Density: 0.0/sq mi (0.0/km^{2})
- Time zone: UTC+1 (CET)
  - Summer (DST): UTC+2 (CEST)

Krezluk (Serbian Cyrillic: Крезлук) is a village in the municipality of Jajce, Bosnia and Herzegovina.

== Demographics ==
According to the 2013 census, its population was nil, down from 154 in 1991.
