= Vukićevci =

- Village
- Location within Bosnia and Herzegovina
- Coordinates: 44°23′N 17°19′E
- Country: Bosnia and Herzegovina
- Entity: Federation of Bosnia and Herzegovina
- Canton: Central Bosnia
- Municipality: Jajce

Area
  - Total: 1.47 sq mi (3.80 km^{2})

Population (2013)
  - Total: 271
  - Density: 185/sq mi (71.3/km^{2})
- Time zone: UTC+1 (CET)
  - Summer (DST): UTC+2 (CEST)

Vukićevci is a village in the municipality of Jajce, Bosnia and Herzegovina.

== Demographics ==
According to the 2013 census, its population was 271.

Ethnicity in 2013
Ethnicity	Number	Percentage
Croats	269	99.3%
other/undeclared	2	0.7%
Total	271	100%
