= Karići (Jajce) =

- Village
- Location within Bosnia and Herzegovina
- Country: Bosnia and Herzegovina
- Entity: Federation of Bosnia and Herzegovina
- Canton: Central Bosnia
- Municipality: Jajce

Area
  - Total: 0.64 sq mi (1.65 km^{2})

Population (2013)
  - Total: 160
  - Density: 250/sq mi (97/km^{2})
- Time zone: UTC+1 (CET)
  - Summer (DST): UTC+2 (CEST)

Karići is a village in the municipality of Jajce, Bosnia and Herzegovina.

== Demographics ==
According to the 2013 census, its population was 160.

Ethnicity in 2013
Ethnicity	Number	Percentage
Croats	135	84.4%
Bosniaks	24	15.0%
Serbs	1	0.6%
Total	160	100%
