= Jezera =

Jezera, meaning "Lakes" in several Slavic languages, may refer to:

- Jezera, Teslić, a village in the municipality of Teslić, Bosnia and Herzegovina
- Jezera, Tisno, a village in the municipality of Tisno, Croatia

== See also ==
- Jezero (disambiguation)
