= Bulići =

- Village
- Location within Bosnia and Herzegovina
- Country: Bosnia and Herzegovina
- Entity: Federation of Bosnia and Herzegovina
- Canton: Central Bosnia
- Municipality: Jajce

Area
  - Total: 2.86 sq mi (7.41 km^{2})

Population (2013)
  - Total: 1,014
  - Density: 354/sq mi (137/km^{2})
- Time zone: UTC+1 (CET)
  - Summer (DST): UTC+2 (CEST)

Bulići is a village in the municipality of Jajce, Bosnia and Herzegovina.

== Demographics ==
According to the 2013 census, its population was 1,014.

Ethnicity in 2013
Ethnicity	Number	Percentage
Croats	605	59.7%
Bosniaks	391	38.6%
other/undeclared	18	1.8%
Total	1,014	100%
