= Kruščica (Jajce) =

- Village
- Location within Bosnia and Herzegovina
- Country: Bosnia and Herzegovina
- Entity: Federation of Bosnia and Herzegovina
- Canton: Central Bosnia
- Municipality: Jajce

Area
  - Total: 6.99 sq mi (18.10 km^{2})

Population (2013)
  - Total: 685
  - Density: 98.0/sq mi (37.8/km^{2})
- Time zone: UTC+1 (CET)
  - Summer (DST): UTC+2 (CEST)

Kruščica is a village in the municipality of Jajce, Bosnia and Herzegovina.

== Demographics ==
According to the 2013 census, its population was 685.

Ethnicity in 2013
Ethnicity	Number	Percentage
Bosniaks	682	99.6%
other/undeclared	3	0.4%
Total	685	100%
