= Donji Bešpelj =

- Village
- Location within Bosnia and Herzegovina
- Coordinates: 44°25′N 17°18′E
- Country: Bosnia and Herzegovina
- Entity: Federation of Bosnia and Herzegovina
- Canton: Central Bosnia
- Municipality: Jajce

Area
  - Total: 6.57 sq mi (17.01 km^{2})

Population (2013)
  - Total: 536
  - Density: 81.6/sq mi (31.5/km^{2})
- Time zone: UTC+1 (CET)
  - Summer (DST): UTC+2 (CEST)

Donji Bešpelj is a village in the municipality of Jajce, Bosnia and Herzegovina,

== Demographics ==
According to the 2013 census, its population was 536.

Ethnicity in 2013
Ethnicity	Number	Percentage
Bosniaks	297	55.4%
Croats	237	44.2%
other/undeclared	2	0.4%
Total	536	100%
