= Prudi =

- Village
- Location within Bosnia and Herzegovina
- Country: Bosnia and Herzegovina
- Entity: Federation of Bosnia and Herzegovina
- Canton: Central Bosnia
- Municipality: Jajce

Area
  - Total: 0.44 sq mi (1.14 km^{2})

Population (2013)
  - Total: 420
  - Density: 950/sq mi (370/km^{2})
- Time zone: UTC+1 (CET)
  - Summer (DST): UTC+2 (CEST)

Prudi is a village in the municipality of Jajce, Bosnia and Herzegovina.

== Demographics ==
According to the 2013 census, its population was 420.

Ethnicity in 2013
Ethnicity	Number	Percentage
Bosniaks	316	75.2%
Croats	93	22.1%
Serbs	2	0.5%
other/undeclared	9	2.1%
Total	420	100%
