= Zdaljevac =

- Village
- Location within Bosnia and Herzegovina
- Coordinates: 44°24′N 17°17′E
- Country: Bosnia and Herzegovina
- Entity: Federation of Bosnia and Herzegovina
- Canton: Central Bosnia
- Municipality: Jajce

Area
  - Total: 1.93 sq mi (5.00 km^{2})

Population (2013)
  - Total: 147
  - Density: 76.1/sq mi (29.4/km^{2})
- Time zone: UTC+1 (CET)
  - Summer (DST): UTC+2 (CEST)

Zdaljevac is a village in the municipality of Jajce, Bosnia and Herzegovina.

== Demographics ==
According to the 2013 census, its population was 147.

Ethnicity in 2013
Ethnicity	Number	Percentage
Croats	76	51.7%
Bosniaks	71	48.3%
Total	147	100%
