= Studeno, Kočevje =

Studeno
- Location in Slovenia
- Coordinates: 45°33′51.25″N 14°59′56.22″E
- Country: Slovenia
- Traditional region: Lower Carniola
- Statistical region: Southeast Slovenia
- Municipality: Kočevje
- Elevation: 584.2 m (1,917 ft)

Population (2002)
  - Total: none

Studeno (pronounced [stuˈdeːnɔ]; German: Brunnsee, Gottscheerish: Sheab, Prunnsheab) is a remote abandoned settlement in the Municipality of Kočevje in southern Slovenia. The area is part of the traditional region of Lower Carniola and is now included in the Southeast Slovenia Statistical Region. Its territory is now part of the village of Knežja Lipa.

== Name ==
The name Studeno literally means 'spring', and it and similar forms (e.g., Studenec, Studenci) are relatively common toponyms for places in Slovenia associated with springs. It is derived from Slavic *studenьcь '(walled) spring', from the adjective *studenъ 'cold'. Most of the German medieval attestations of such places contain the Bavarian Middle High German element prunne 'spring' (cf. Middle High German brunne). The standard German name of the village, Brunnsee, literally means 'lake/pond formed by a spring', probably referring to a spring that was walled to collect water. The Gottscheerish form Prunnsheab (and the clipped form Sheab) correspond to the standard German: prunn(le) 'spring' + şéa(b) 'lake, sea' (in Karl Schröer's transcription).

== History ==
In the land registry of 1574 Studeno consisted of one full farm divided into two half farms and a population between 8 and 11. In 1770 the village had four houses. In the 19th century it had five houses and a population of 14. However, by 1937, the village had only one house and a population of three. After the Second World War, there was only one house in Studeno.
