= Peratovci =

- Village
- Location within Bosnia and Herzegovina
- Country: Bosnia and Herzegovina
- Entity: Federation of Bosnia and Herzegovina
- Canton: Central Bosnia
- Municipality: Jajce

Area
  - Total: 0.44 sq mi (1.13 km^{2})

Population (2013)
  - Total: 331
  - Density: 759/sq mi (293/km^{2})
- Time zone: UTC+1 (CET)
  - Summer (DST): UTC+2 (CEST)

Peratovci is a village in the municipality of Jajce, Bosnia and Herzegovina.

== Demographics ==
According to the 2013 census, its population was 331.

Ethnicity in 2013
Ethnicity	Number	Percentage
Croats	300	90.6%
Bosniaks	29	8.8%
other/undeclared	2	0.6%
Total	331	100%
