= Žaovine =

- Village
- Location within Bosnia and Herzegovina
- Coordinates: 44°20′N 17°12′E
- Country: Bosnia and Herzegovina
- Entity: Federation of Bosnia and Herzegovina
- Canton: Central Bosnia
- Municipality: Jajce

Area
  - Total: 1.22 sq mi (3.15 km^{2})

Population (2013)
  - Total: 3
  - Density: 2.5/sq mi (0.95/km^{2})
- Time zone: UTC+1 (CET)
  - Summer (DST): UTC+2 (CEST)

Žaovine is a village in the municipality of Jajce, Bosnia and Herzegovina.

== Demographics ==
According to the 2013 census, its population was 3, all Bosniaks.
