= Đumezlije =

Đumezlije Ђумезлије
- Village
- Location within Bosnia and Herzegovina
- Coordinates: 44°21′N 17°10′E
- Country: Bosnia and Herzegovina
- Entity: Republika Srpska
- Municipality: Jezero

Population (2013)
  - Total: 66
- Time zone: UTC+1 (CET)
  - Summer (DST): UTC+2 (CEST)

Đumezlije (Serbian Cyrillic: Ђумезлије) is a village in the municipality of Jezero, Bosnia and Herzegovina. Its population was 66 as of the 2013 census, with 32 Bosniaks and 33 Serbs, as well as one Croat. There were 33 women and 33 men as well.
