= Biokovina =

Biokovina Биоковина
- Village
- Location within Bosnia and Herzegovina
- Coordinates: 44°18′N 17°19′E
- Country: Bosnia and Herzegovina
- Entity: Federation of Bosnia and Herzegovina
- Canton: Central Bosnia
- Municipality: Jajce

Area
  - Total: 1.92 sq mi (4.98 km^{2})

Population (2013)
  - Total: 225
  - Density: 117/sq mi (45.2/km^{2})
- Time zone: UTC+1 (CET)
  - Summer (DST): UTC+2 (CEST)

Biokovina (Serbian Cyrillic: Биоковина) is a village in the municipality of Jajce, Bosnia and Herzegovina.

== Demographics ==
According to the 2013 census, its population was 225.

Ethnicity in 2013
Ethnicity	Number	Percentage
Bosniaks	223	99.1%
other/undeclared	2	0.9%
Total	225	100%
