= Barevo =

Barevo Барево
- Village
- Location within Bosnia and Herzegovina
- Coordinates: 44°24′45″N 17°15′00″E
- Country: Bosnia and Herzegovina
- Entity: Federation of Bosnia and Herzegovina
- Canton: Central Bosnia
- Municipality: Jajce

Area
  - Total: 9.64 sq mi (24.96 km^{2})

Population (2013)
  - Total: 685
  - Density: 71.1/sq mi (27.4/km^{2})
- Time zone: UTC+1 (CET)
  - Summer (DST): UTC+2 (CEST)

Barevo (Serbian Cyrillic: Барево) is a village in the municipalities of Jajce, Bosnia and Herzegovina.

== Demographics ==
According to the 2013 census, its population was 685.

Ethnicity in 2013
Ethnicity	Number	Percentage
Bosniaks	389	57.2%
Croats	263	37.9%
Serbs	3	0.4%
other/undeclared	30	4.4%
Total	685	100%
