= Lupnica =

- Village
- Location within Bosnia and Herzegovina
- Coordinates: 44°21′16″N 17°19′17″E
- Country: Bosnia and Herzegovina
- Entity: Federation of Bosnia and Herzegovina
- Canton: Central Bosnia
- Municipality: Jajce

Area
  - Total: 0.81 sq mi (2.09 km^{2})

Population (2013)
  - Total: 817
  - Density: 1,010/sq mi (391/km^{2})
- Time zone: UTC+1 (CET)
  - Summer (DST): UTC+2 (CEST)

Lupnica is a village in the municipality of Jajce, Bosnia and Herzegovina.

== Demographics ==
According to the 2013 census, its population was 817.

Ethnicity in 2013
Ethnicity	Number	Percentage
Bosniaks	523	64.0%
Croats	279	34.1%
Serbs	1	0.1%
other/undeclared	14	1.7%
Total	817	100%
