= Kamenice (Jajce) =

Kamenice Каменице
- Village
- Location within Bosnia and Herzegovina
- Country: Bosnia and Herzegovina
- Entity: Federation of Bosnia and Herzegovina
- Canton: Central Bosnia
- Municipality: Jajce

Area
  - Total: 1.00 sq mi (2.59 km^{2})

Population (2013)
  - Total: 34
  - Density: 34/sq mi (13/km^{2})
- Time zone: UTC+1 (CET)
  - Summer (DST): UTC+2 (CEST)

Kamenice (Serbian Cyrillic: Каменице) is a village in the municipality of Jajce, Bosnia and Herzegovina.

== Demographics ==
According to the 2013 census, its population was 34.

Ethnicity in 2013
| Ethnicity | Number | Percentage |
|---|---|---|
| Serbs | 32 | 94.1% |
| Croats | 2 | 5.9% |
| Total | 34 | 100% |
