= Pšenik =

- Village
- Location within Bosnia and Herzegovina
- Coordinates: 44°22′N 17°17′E
- Country: Bosnia and Herzegovina
- Entity: Federation of Bosnia and Herzegovina
- Canton: Central Bosnia
- Municipality: Jajce

Area
  - Total: 1.72 sq mi (4.46 km^{2})

Population (2013)
  - Total: 328
  - Density: 190/sq mi (73.5/km^{2})
- Time zone: UTC+1 (CET)
  - Summer (DST): UTC+2 (CEST)

Pšenik is a village in the municipality of Jajce, Bosnia and Herzegovina.

== Demographics ==
According to the 2013 census, its population was 328.

Ethnicity in 2013
Ethnicity	Number	Percentage
Bosniaks	324	98.8%
Croats	1	0.3%
other/undeclared	3	0.9%
Total	328	100%
