= Bučići (Jajce) =

Bučići Бучићи
- Village
- Location within Bosnia and Herzegovina
- Coordinates: 44°20′29″N 17°22′22″E
- Country: Bosnia and Herzegovina
- Entity: Federation of Bosnia and Herzegovina
- Canton: Central Bosnia
- Municipality: Jajce

Area
  - Total: 3.18 sq mi (8.24 km^{2})

Population (2013)
  - Total: 458
  - Density: 144/sq mi (55.6/km^{2})
- Time zone: UTC+1 (CET)
  - Summer (DST): UTC+2 (CEST)

Bučići (Serbian Cyrillic: Бучићи) is a village in the municipality of Jajce, Bosnia and Herzegovina.

== Demographics ==
According to the 2013 census, its population was 458, all Bosniaks.
