= Smionica =

- Village
- Location within Bosnia and Herzegovina
- Coordinates: 44°24′N 17°20′E
- Country: Bosnia and Herzegovina
- Entity: Federation of Bosnia and Herzegovina
- Canton: Central Bosnia
- Municipality: Jajce

Area
  - Total: 0.94 sq mi (2.43 km^{2})

Population (2013)
  - Total: 271
  - Density: 289/sq mi (112/km^{2})
- Time zone: UTC+1 (CET)
  - Summer (DST): UTC+2 (CEST)

Smionica is a village in the municipality of Jajce, Bosnia and Herzegovina.

== Demographics ==
According to the 2013 census, its population was 271.

Ethnicity in 2013
Ethnicity	Number	Percentage
Croats	214	79.0%
Bosniaks	56	20.7%
other/undeclared	1	0.4%
Total	271	100%
