= Vrbica (Jajce) =

Vrbica Врбица
- Village
- Location within Bosnia and Herzegovina
- Country: Bosnia and Herzegovina
- Entity: Federation of Bosnia and Herzegovina
- Canton: Central Bosnia
- Municipality: Jajce

Area
  - Total: 1.77 sq mi (4.58 km^{2})

Population (2013)
  - Total: 602
  - Density: 340/sq mi (131/km^{2})
- Time zone: UTC+1 (CET)
  - Summer (DST): UTC+2 (CEST)

Vrbica is a village in the municipality of Jajce, Bosnia and Herzegovina.

== Demographics ==
According to the 2013 census, its population was 602 and according to the 1991 Census, its population was 652.

Ethnicity in 2013
Ethnicity	Number	Percentage
Croats	589	97.8%
Bosniaks	3	0.5%
Serbs	5	0.8%
other/undeclared	5	0.8%
Total	602	100%
