= Magarovci =

- Village
- Location within Bosnia and Herzegovina
- Coordinates: 44°21′N 17°18′E
- Country: Bosnia and Herzegovina
- Entity: Federation of Bosnia and Herzegovina
- Canton: Central Bosnia
- Municipality: Jajce

Area
  - Total: 0.53 sq mi (1.36 km^{2})

Population (2013)
  - Total: 157
  - Density: 299/sq mi (115/km^{2})
- Time zone: UTC+1 (CET)
  - Summer (DST): UTC+2 (CEST)

Magarovci is a village in the municipality of Jajce, Bosnia and Herzegovina.

== Demographics ==
According to the 2013 census, its population was 157.

Ethnicity in 2013
| Ethnicity | Number | Percentage |
|---|---|---|
| Croats | 155 | 98.7% |
| Serbs | 1 | 0.6% |
| other/undeclared | 1 | 0.6% |
| Total | 157 | 100% |
