= Doribaba =

- Village
- Location within Bosnia and Herzegovina
- Coordinates: 44°22′N 17°21′E
- Country: Bosnia and Herzegovina
- Entity: Federation of Bosnia and Herzegovina
- Canton: Central Bosnia
- Municipality: Jajce

Area
  - Total: 3.63 sq mi (9.40 km^{2})

Population (2013)
  - Total: 588
  - Density: 162/sq mi (62.6/km^{2})
- Time zone: UTC+1 (CET)
  - Summer (DST): UTC+2 (CEST)

Doribaba is a village in the municipality of Jajce, Bosnia and Herzegovina.

== Demographics ==
According to the 2013 census, its population was 588.

Ethnicity in 2013
Ethnicity	Number	Percentage
Croats	383	65.1%
Bosniaks	201	34.2%
Serbs	1	0.2%
other/undeclared	3	0.5%
Total	588	100%
