= Pero Šimleša =

Croatian educational theorist (1910–1988)

Pero Šimleša (27 April 1910 - 2 August 1988) also known as Petar Šimleša, surname sometimes written Shimlesha, was a Croatian university professor and educational theorist.

== Biography ==
Šimleša was born on 27 April 1910, in the village of Ljuša near Jajce, Bosnia and Herzegovina. He completed his primary and secondary education in his hometown and Jajce and then went on to study pedagogy at the Faculty of Philosophy in Zagreb, where he later earned his doctorate in 1951.

During his tenure, Šimleša served as a faculty member at the Faculty of Philosophy in Zagreb from 1946 until his retirement in 1975. He became a full professor at this institution in 1960. Throughout his career, he held various leadership positions at the Faculty of Philosophy in Zagreb, including heading the Department of Pedagogy, leading the Chair of Didactics and Methodology, and serving as the dean of the faculty from 1966 to 1968.

In the field of education and pedagogy, Šimleša was an advocate for educational reform and modern teaching methods. Additionally, he was a member of the Croatian Parliament (Sabor) and served as the president of the Croatian Educational Council. His contributions were recognized with several awards, including the monumental plaque of J. A. Comenius and the national award "Ivan Filipović" for lifetime achievements.

== Publications ==
- "Uzroci formalizma u znanju učenika", 1951: An exploration of the causes of formalism in student knowledge.
- "Metodika", 1954: A comprehensive overview of teaching methodology.
- "Suvremena nastava", 1965: A book on contemporary teaching practices.
- "Na putu do reformirane škole", 1977: A discussion on the path toward an improved educational system.
- "Izabrana djela", 1980: A collection of selected works.
- "Enciklopedijski rječnik pedagogije", 1963 (editor)
- "Pedagogjia", 1985, 1988, 1990, editor, Prishtina, (in Albanian)
- "Pedagoška enciklopedija", 1989 (editor)
