= Lendići (Jajce) =

Lendići Лендићи
- Village
- Location within Bosnia and Herzegovina
- Coordinates: 44°21′N 17°22′E
- Country: Bosnia and Herzegovina
- Entity: Federation of Bosnia and Herzegovina
- Canton: Central Bosnia
- Municipality: Jajce

Area
  - Total: 2.35 sq mi (6.08 km^{2})

Population (2013)
  - Total: 621
  - Density: 265/sq mi (102/km^{2})
- Time zone: UTC+1 (CET)
  - Summer (DST): UTC+2 (CEST)

Lendići (Serbian Cyrillic: Лендићи) is a village in the municipality of Jajce, Bosnia and Herzegovina.

== Demographics ==
According to the 2013 census, its population was 621.

Ethnicity in 2013
Ethnicity	Number	Percentage
Bosniaks	606	97.6%
Croats	14	2.3%
other/undeclared	1	0.2%
Total	621	100%
