= Podlipci =

- Village
- Location within Bosnia and Herzegovina
- Coordinates: 44°21′N 17°21′E
- Country: Bosnia and Herzegovina
- Entity: Federation of Bosnia and Herzegovina
- Canton: Central Bosnia
- Municipality: Jajce

Area
  - Total: 0.71 sq mi (1.83 km^{2})

Population (2013)
  - Total: 183
  - Density: 259/sq mi (100/km^{2})
- Time zone: UTC+1 (CET)
  - Summer (DST): UTC+2 (CEST)

Podlipci is a village in the municipality of Jajce, Bosnia and Herzegovina.

== Demographics ==
According to the 2013 census, its population was 183.

Ethnicity in 2013
| Ethnicity | Number | Percentage |
|---|---|---|
| Bosniaks | 115 | 62.8% |
| Croats | 16 | 36.1% |
| other/undeclared | 2 | 1.1% |
| Total | 183 | 100% |
