= Kuprešani =

- Village
- Location within Bosnia and Herzegovina
- Country: Bosnia and Herzegovina
- Entity: Federation of Bosnia and Herzegovina
- Canton: Central Bosnia
- Municipality: Jajce

Area
  - Total: 3.75 sq mi (9.71 km^{2})

Population (2013)
  - Total: 770
  - Density: 210/sq mi (79/km^{2})
- Time zone: UTC+1 (CET)
  - Summer (DST): UTC+2 (CEST)

Kuprešani is a village in the municipality of Jajce, Bosnia and Herzegovina.

== Demographics ==
According to the 2013 census, its population was 770.

Ethnicity in 2013
Ethnicity	Number	Percentage
Bosniaks	367	47.7%
Croats	326	42.3%
other/undeclared	77	10.0%
Total	770	100%
