= Kovačevac, Jezero =

Kovačevac Ковачевац
- Village
- Location within Bosnia and Herzegovina
- Coordinates: 44°21′41″N 17°08′07″E
- Country: Bosnia and Herzegovina
- Entity: Republika Srpska
- Region: Banja Luka
- Municipality: Jezero

Area
  - Total: 1.77 sq mi (4.59 km^{2})

Population (2013)
  - Total: 96
  - Density: 54/sq mi (21/km^{2})
- Time zone: UTC+1 (CET)
  - Summer (DST): UTC+2 (CEST)

Kovačevac (Serbian Cyrillic: Ковачевац) is a village in the municipality of Jezero, Bosnia and Herzegovina.

== Demographics ==
According to the 2013 census, its population was 96.

Ethnicity in 2013
Ethnicity	Number	Percentage
Serbs	94	97.9%
Croats	1	1.0%
other/undeclared	1	1.0%
Total	96	100%
