= Gornji Bešpelj =

- Village
- Location within Bosnia and Herzegovina
- Coordinates: 44°25′N 17°19′E
- Country: Bosnia and Herzegovina
- Entity: Federation of Bosnia and Herzegovina
- Canton: Central Bosnia
- Municipality: Jajce

Area
  - Total: 3.88 sq mi (10.06 km^{2})

Population (2013)
  - Total: 310
  - Density: 80/sq mi (31/km^{2})
- Time zone: UTC+1 (CET)
  - Summer (DST): UTC+2 (CEST)

Gornji Bešpelj is a village in the municipality of Jajce, Bosnia and Herzegovina.

== Demographics ==
According to the 2013 census, its population was 310.

Ethnicity in 2013
Ethnicity	Number	Percentage
Bosniaks	159	51.3%
Croats	148	47.7%
other/undeclared	3	1.0%
Total	310	100%
