= Jezero, Konjic =

Village in Bosnia and Herzegovina

Jezero
- Village
- Location within Bosnia and Herzegovina
- Coordinates: 43°33′30″N 18°01′43″E
- Country: Bosnia and Herzegovina
- Entity: Federation of Bosnia and Herzegovina
- Canton: Herzegovina-Neretva
- Municipality: Konjic

Area
  - Total: 6.50 sq mi (16.83 km^{2})

Population (2013)
  - Total: 32
  - Density: 4.9/sq mi (1.9/km^{2})
- Time zone: UTC+1 (CET)
  - Summer (DST): UTC+2 (CEST)

Jezero is a village in the municipality of Konjic, Bosnia and Herzegovina.

== Name ==
The name of this village means "lake" in the native language

== Demographics ==
According to the 2013 census, its population was 32.

Ethnicity in 2013
Ethnicity	Number	Percentage
Serbs	21	65.6%
Bosniaks	9	28.1%
Croats	1	3.1%
other/undeclared	1	3.1%
Total	32	100%
