= Ćusine =

- Village
- Location within Bosnia and Herzegovina
- Country: Bosnia and Herzegovina
- Entity: Federation of Bosnia and Herzegovina
- Canton: Central Bosnia
- Municipality: Jajce

Area
  - Total: 2.95 sq mi (7.63 km^{2})

Population (2013)
  - Total: 172
  - Density: 58.4/sq mi (22.5/km^{2})
- Time zone: UTC+1 (CET)
  - Summer (DST): UTC+2 (CEST)

Ćusine is a village in the municipality of Jajce, Bosnia and Herzegovina.

== Demographics ==
According to the 2013 census, its population was 172.

Ethnicity in 2013
Ethnicity	Number	Percentage
Croats	90	52.3%
Serbs	59	34.3%
Bosniaks	18	10.5%
other/undeclared	5	2.9%
Total	172	100%
