= Vinac =

Vinac Винац
- Village
- Location within Bosnia and Herzegovina
- Coordinates: 44°16′N 17°17′E
- Country: Bosnia and Herzegovina
- Entity: Federation of Bosnia and Herzegovina
- Canton: Central Bosnia
- Municipality: Jajce

Area
  - Total: 2.32 sq mi (6.02 km^{2})

Population (2013)
  - Total: 1,085
  - Density: 467/sq mi (180/km^{2})
- Time zone: UTC+1 (CET)
  - Summer (DST): UTC+2 (CEST)

Vinac (Serbian Cyrillic: Винац) is a village in the municipality of Jajce, Bosnia and Herzegovina.

== Demographics ==
According to the 2013 census, its population was 1,085.

Ethnicity in 2013
Ethnicity	Number	Percentage
Bosniaks	1,043	96.1%
Serbs	11	1.0%
other/undeclared	31	2.9%
Total	1,085	100%
