= Jezero, Trebnje =

Village in Lower Carniola, Slovenia

Jezero
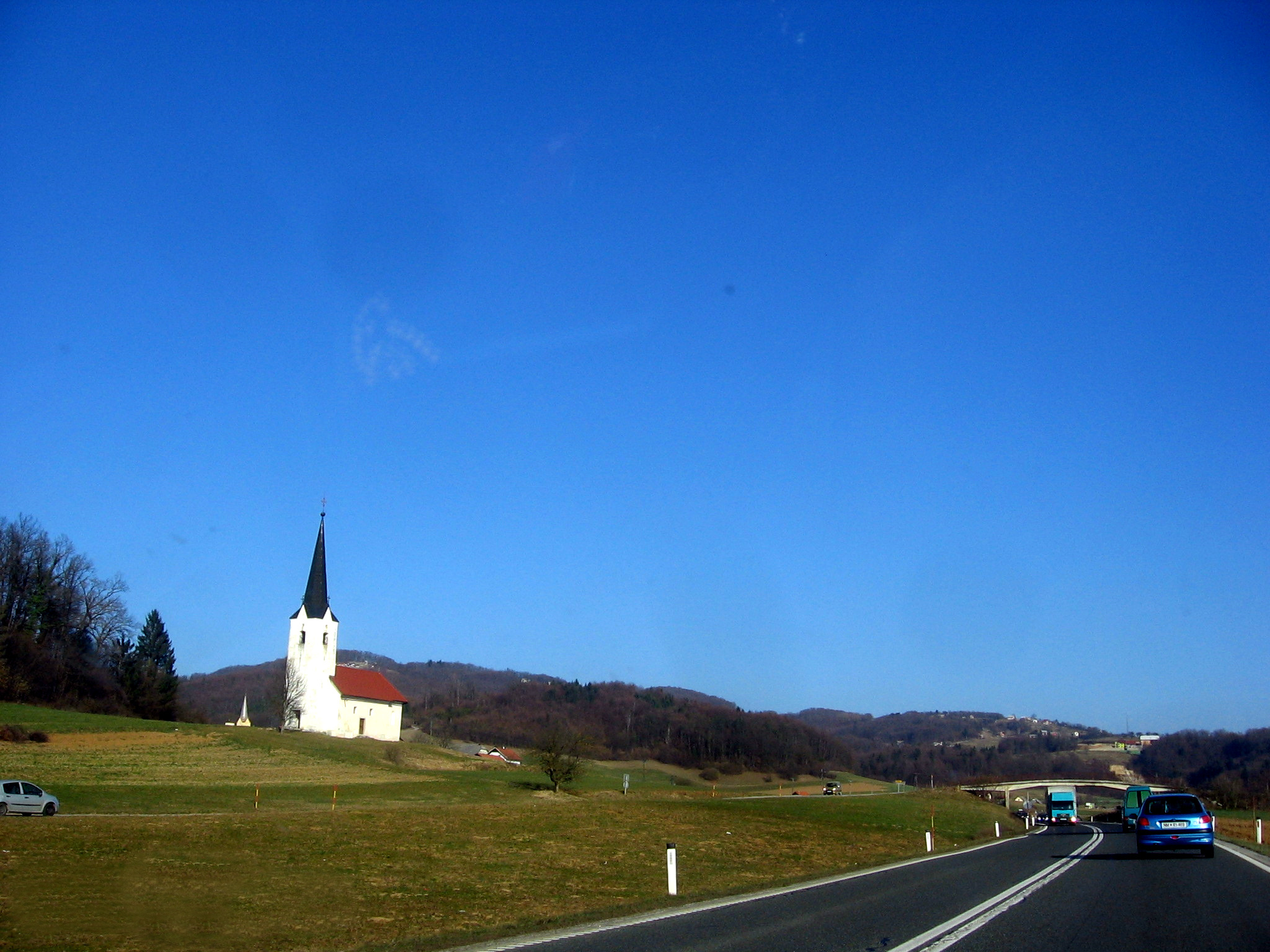
- St. Peter's Church next to the local road in Jezero

- Location in Slovenia
- Coordinates: 45°53′48.38″N 15°3′54.71″E
- Country: Slovenia
- Traditional region: Lower Carniola
- Statistical region: Southeast Slovenia
- Municipality: Trebnje

Area
  - Total: 3.71 km^{2} (1.43 sq mi)
- Elevation: 273.9 m (899 ft)

Population (2002)
  - Total: 128

Jezero (pronounced [ˈjeːzɛɾɔ]) is a village east of Trebnje in eastern Slovenia in the Municipality of Trebnje. The area is part of the historical region of Lower Carniola. The municipality is now included in the Southeast Slovenia Statistical Region.

== Church ==
The local church is dedicated to Saint Peter and belongs to the Parish of Trebnje. It dates to at least the 14th century and contains traces of 15th-century frescos.
