= Studenec, Postojna =

Studenec
- Location in Slovenia
- Coordinates: 45°45′57.07″N 14°8′50.4″E
- Country: Slovenia
- Traditional region: Inner Carniola
- Statistical region: Littoral–Inner Carniola
- Municipality: Postojna

Area
  - Total: 2.44 km^{2} (0.94 sq mi)
- Elevation: 551.2 m (1,808 ft)

Population (2002)
  - Total: 75

Studenec (pronounced [stuˈdɛːnəts]; Italian: Studenza) is a village west of Postojna in the Inner Carniola region of Slovenia.

The local church in the settlement is dedicated to Saint Barbara and belongs to the Parish of Hrenovice.
