= Jezero, Bosnia and Herzegovina =

Village and municipality in Bosnia and Herzegovina

Jezero Језеро
- Village and municipality
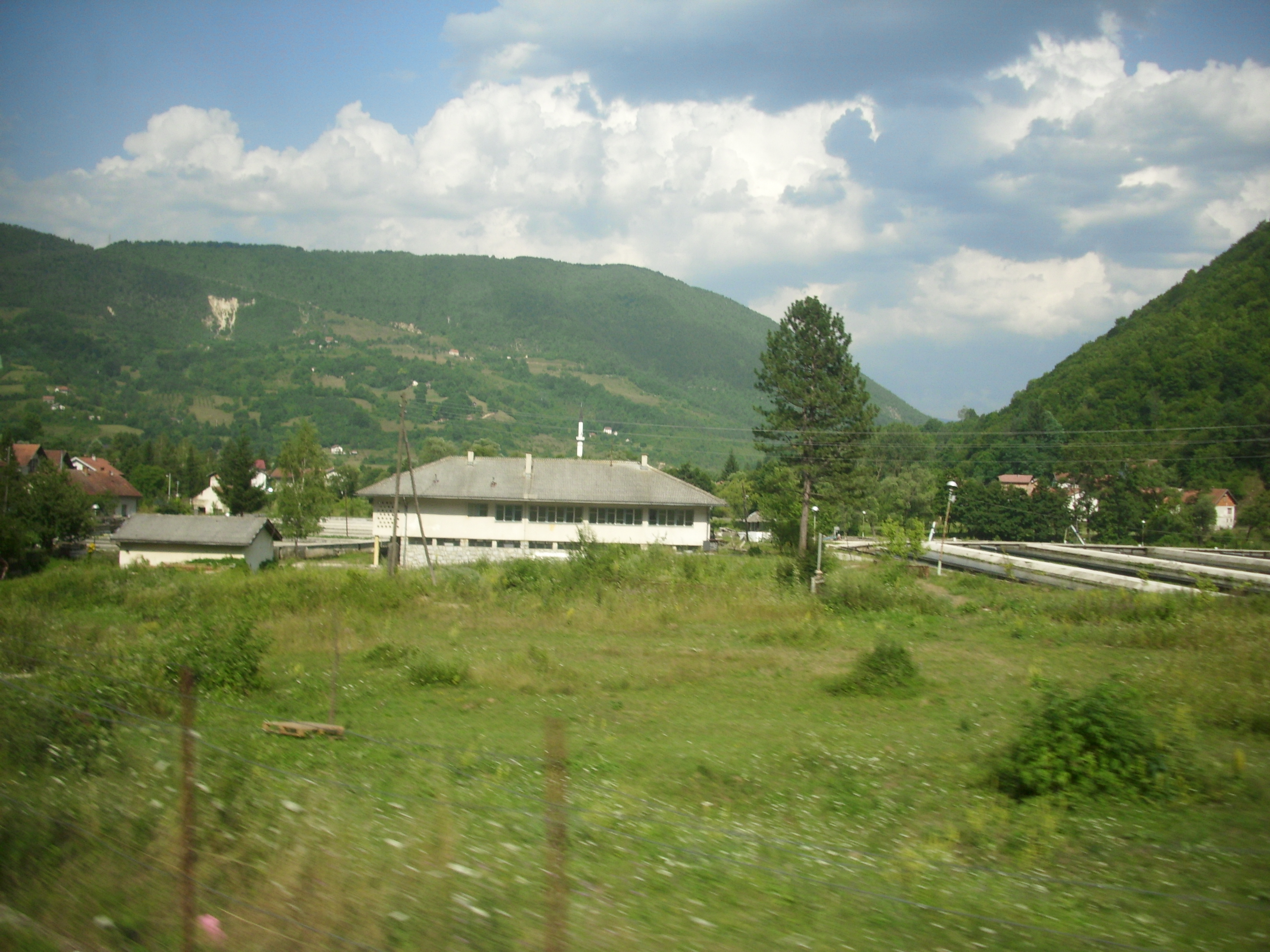

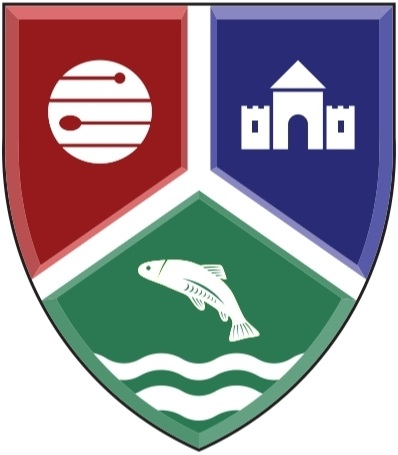
- Coat of arms

- Location of Jezero within Bosnia and Herzegovina

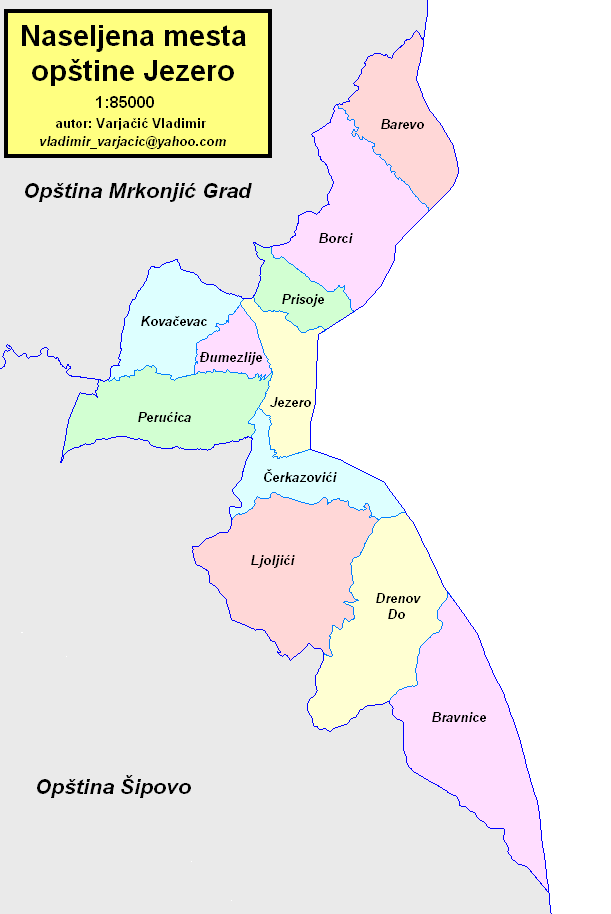
- Coordinates: 44°21′0″N 17°10′5″E
- Country: Bosnia and Herzegovina
- Entity: Republika Srpska
- Geographical region: Bosanska Krajina

Government
  - Municipal mayor: Snežana Ružičić (SNSD)

Area
  - Total: 55.6 km^{2} (21.5 sq mi)

Population (2013)
  - Total: 1,144
  - Density: 20.6/km^{2} (53.3/sq mi)
- Time zone: UTC+1 (CET)
  - Summer (DST): UTC+2 (CEST)
- Area code: 387 (50)
- Website: www.opstinajezero.org/lat

Jezero (Serbian Cyrillic: Језеро, lit. "Lake") is a village and a municipality in Republika Srpska, Bosnia and Herzegovina. As of 2013, it has a population of 1,144 inhabitants, while the village of Jezero has a population of 581 inhabitants. A small part of the village in Jajce municipality has a population of 6.

== Etymology ==
The village name Jezero derives from the word jezero which in most Slavic languages (Bulgarian, Macedonian: езеро, Bosnian, Serbian: jезеро/jezero, Croatian, Czech, Slovene: jezero) and its closest written variations (Polish: jezioro, Kashubian: jezoro, Lower Sorbian: jezer, Slovak: jazero, Russian and Ukrainian: озеро), as well as in Baltic languages (Lithuanian: ežeras, Latvian: ezers) means "lake".

== Geography ==
=== Physical geography ===
The Jezero municipality consists of hills, mountains and basins. The altitude is between 432 and 1267 meters, the highest mountains in the municipality are Gorica and Sinjakovo. The rivers that flow through the Jezero municipality are Pliva and Jošavka as well as their tributaries. Jezero is situated on location where the Pliva river enters Veliko Plivsko Lake.

=== Political geography ===
The Jezero municipality is located in the northeastern part of Republika Srpska. It borders the municipalities of Mrkonjić Grad, Jajce and Šipovo. The Jezero municipality is one of the smaller municipalities of Republika Srpska, with an area of 55,6 km2 and makes up 0,23% of the total territory of the Republic of Srpska.

=== Climate ===
The area of the Jezero municipality belongs to the zone of temperate continental climate with the average annual temperature of is 10.5 °C. The average annual rainfall is about 981 mm, and is evenly distributed throughout the year.

== History ==
=== Ancient times ===
Jezero has had a long history. It is supposed that there had been a settlement at that area even in the Illyrian period and, according to traditional stories, as the Illyrian queen Teuta had ordered, the channel was dug so that the Illyrian fortress was established on the river island where the large part of settlement is still located. Roads passed through Jezero in Roman period and in the Middle Ages. The fortress on the river island was conquered by the Ottoman military during their conquest of Bosnia in 1463.

=== Formation of Jezero municipality ===
Before the war, the municipality of Jezero was a local community and belonged to the municipality of Jajce. After the signing of the Dayton Agreement (The General Framework Agreement for Peace in Bosnia and Herzegovina), inter-entity boundary line separated Jezero from Jajce. Thus the municipality of Jezero was established by the decision of the National Assembly of Republika Srpska in June 1996.

== Demographics ==
=== Population ===
	Population of settlements – Jezero municipality							
	Settlement	1948.	1953.	1961.	1971.	1981.	1991.	2013.
	Total	2,604	3,323				1,949	1,144
1	Borci						227	
2	Čerkazovići						220	
3	Drenov Do						145	
4	Đumezlije						92	
5	Jezero			655	595	728	834	702
6	Kovačevac						131	
7	Ljolići						205	
8	Perućica						95	

=== Ethnic composition ===
Ethnic composition – Jezero
	2013.	1991.	1981.	1971.
Total	702 (100,0%)	834 (100,0%)	728 (100,0%)	595 (100,0%)
Bosniaks		477 (57,19%)	409 (56,18%)	435 (73,11%)
Serbs		282 (33,81%)	245 (33,65%)	131 (22,02%)
Yugoslavs		34 (4,077%)	46 (6,319%)	6 (1,008%)
Croats		33 (3,957%)	13 (1,786%)	19 (3,193%)
Others		8 (0,959%)	9 (1,236%)	4 (0,672%)
Albanians			6 (0,824%)	

Ethnic composition – Jezero municipality
	2013.	1991.	1981.	1971.
Total	1,144 (100,0%)	834 (100,0%)	728 (100,0%)	595 (100,0%)
Bosniaks	287 (25,087%)	477 (57,19%)	409 (56,18%)	435 (73,10%)
Serbs	841 (73,51%)	282 (33,81%)	245 (33,65%)	131 (22,01%)
Croats	11 (0,962%)	33 (3,95%)	13 (1,78%)	19 (3,19%)
Yugoslavs		34 (4,07%)	46 (6,31%)	6 (1,00%)
Others	5 (0,437%)	8 (0,95%)	15 (2,06%)	4 (0,67%)

== Tourism ==
The municipality of Jezero has significant water potential (rivers Pliva, Jošavka and rivers of Perućica, lake Đol in Ljoljići). Those potentials can be used for the development of tourism and hydro potential, ecology and protection of healthy environment.

The municipality of Jezero is located on the river Pliva, halfway between Jajce and Šipovo at an altitude of 430 m. What is specific for Jezero is that it is located exactly on the confluence of the river Pliva, surrounded with a mountain range. Besides Pliva Lake, there are two more lakes nearby: Veliki Đol (Great Đol) and Mali Đol (Small Đol), which are particularly famous among fishermen. Besides, Jezero offers excellent conditions for paragliding, mountaineering and mountain biking.

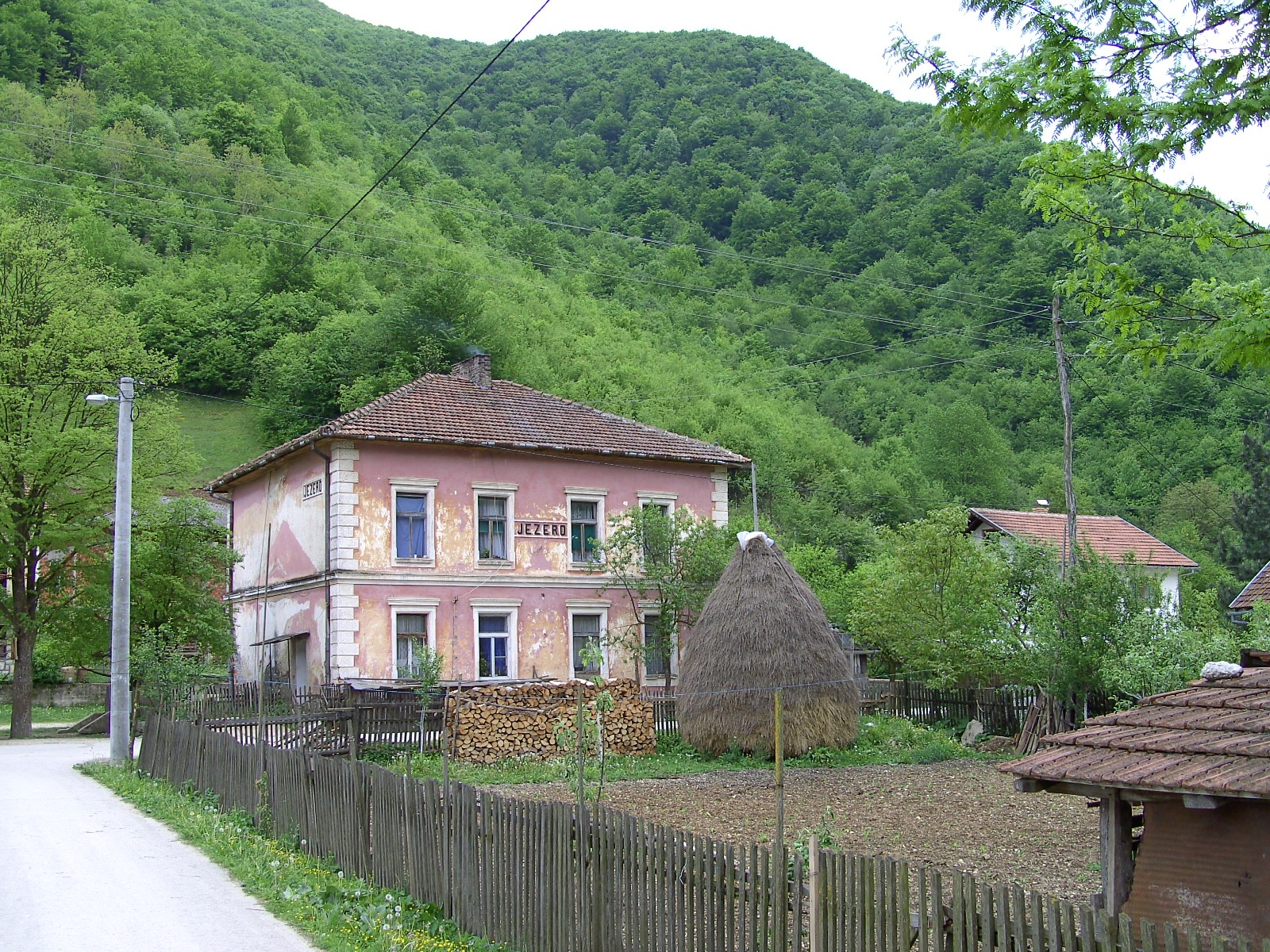
Former railway station

Jezero Municipality area

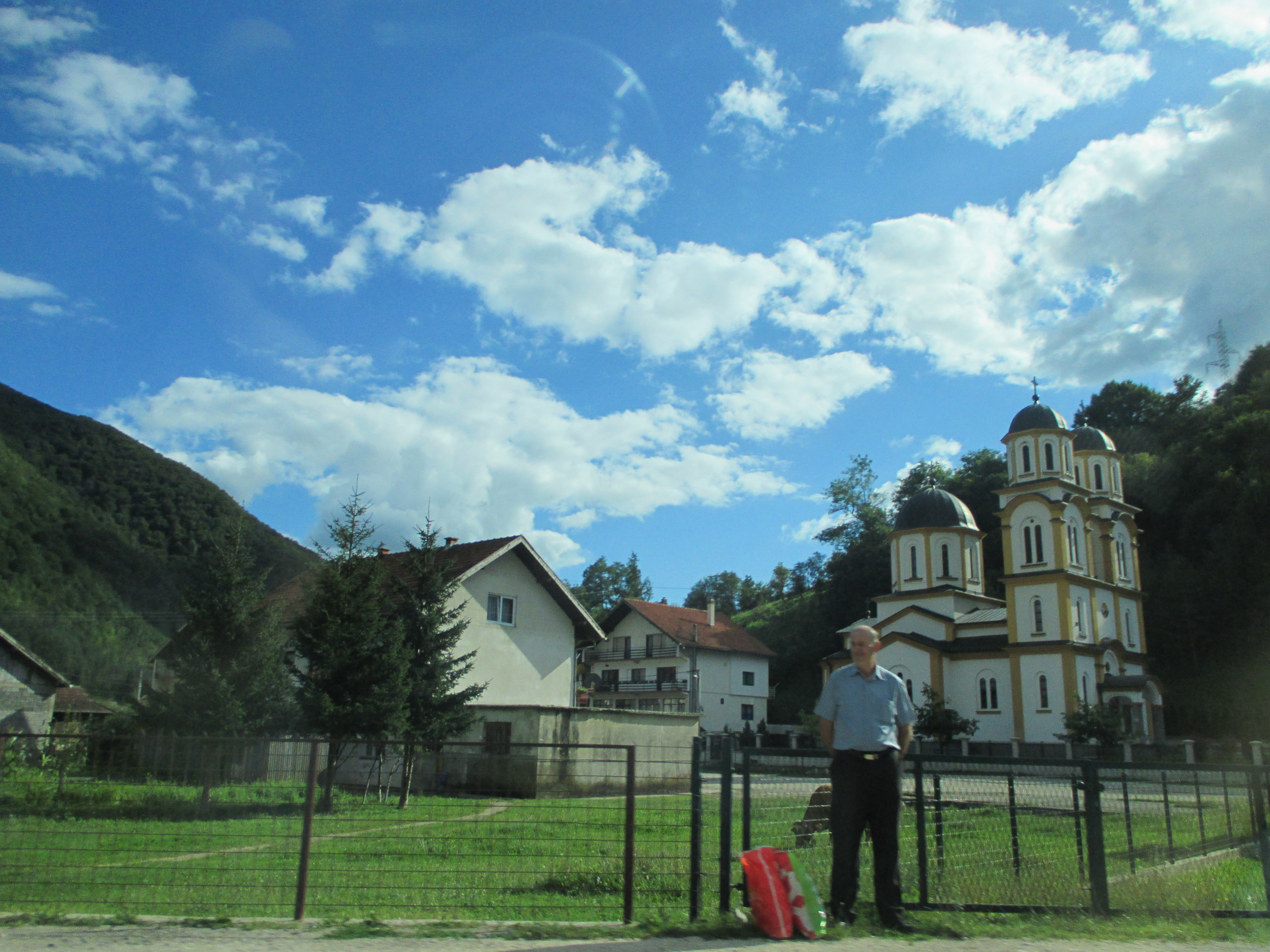
Temple of Holy Martyr Prince Lazar in Jezero

== Jezero on Mars ==
In 2007, following the discovery of an ancient crater-lake on planet Mars, the feature was named Jezero Crater, after this village in Bosnia and Herzegovina, which is one of the country's several eponymous towns and villages.

In November 2018, it was announced that Jezero Crater had been chosen as the landing site for the planned Mars 2020 rover mission.

Planned landing site – Jezero Crater (18.855°N 77.519°E)

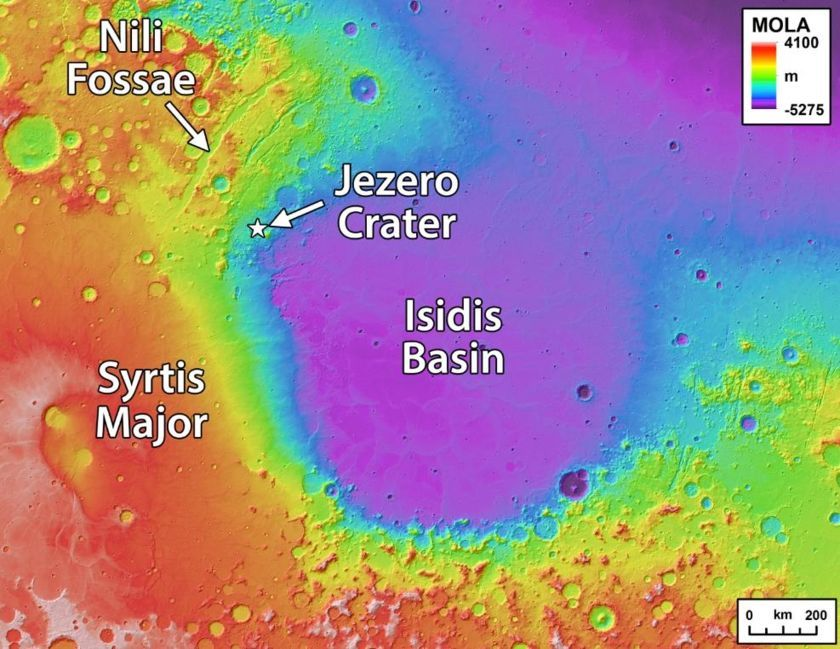
Jezero Crater on edge of western Isidis basin

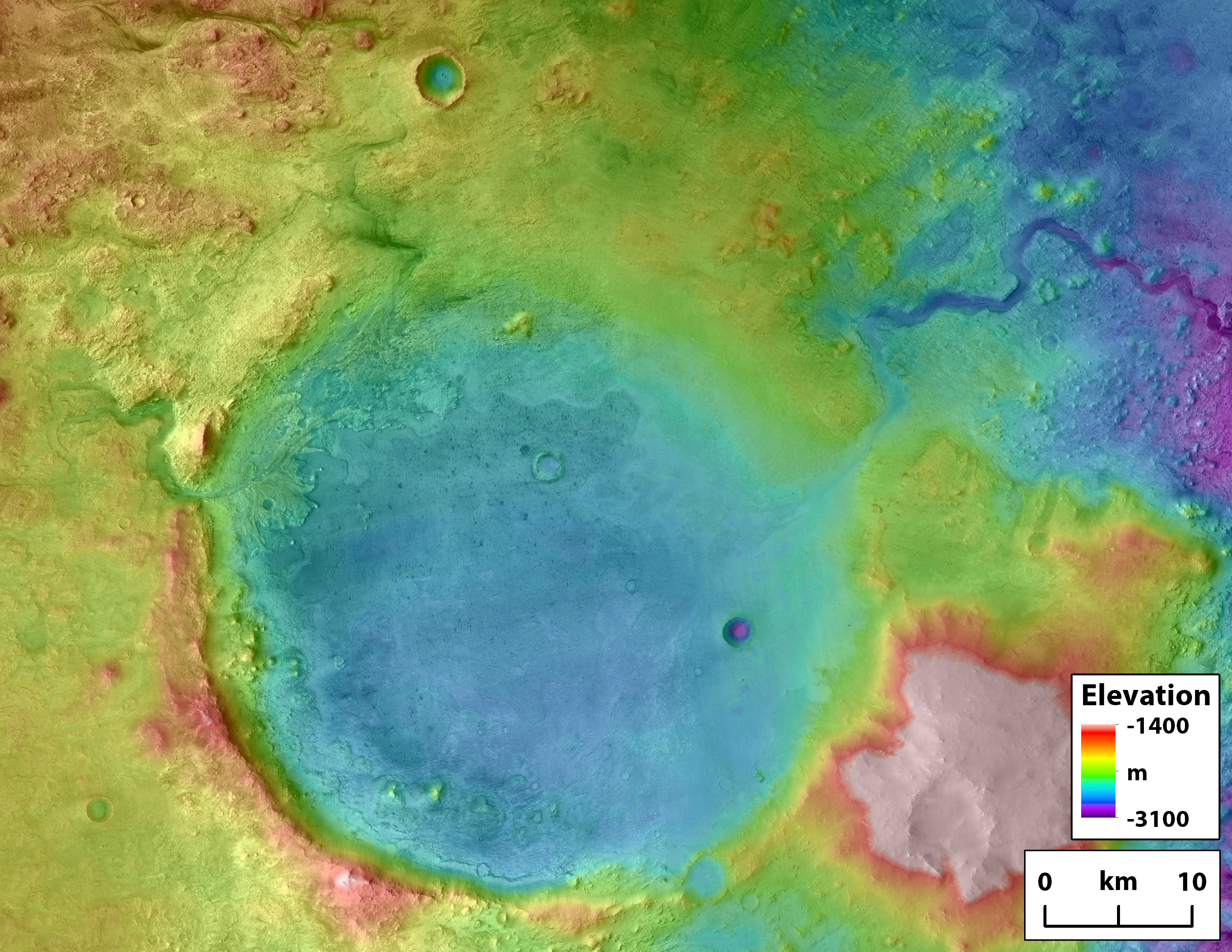
Jezero Crater
Ancient rivers (left) flowed into the crater; overflow carved the outlet canyon (right).

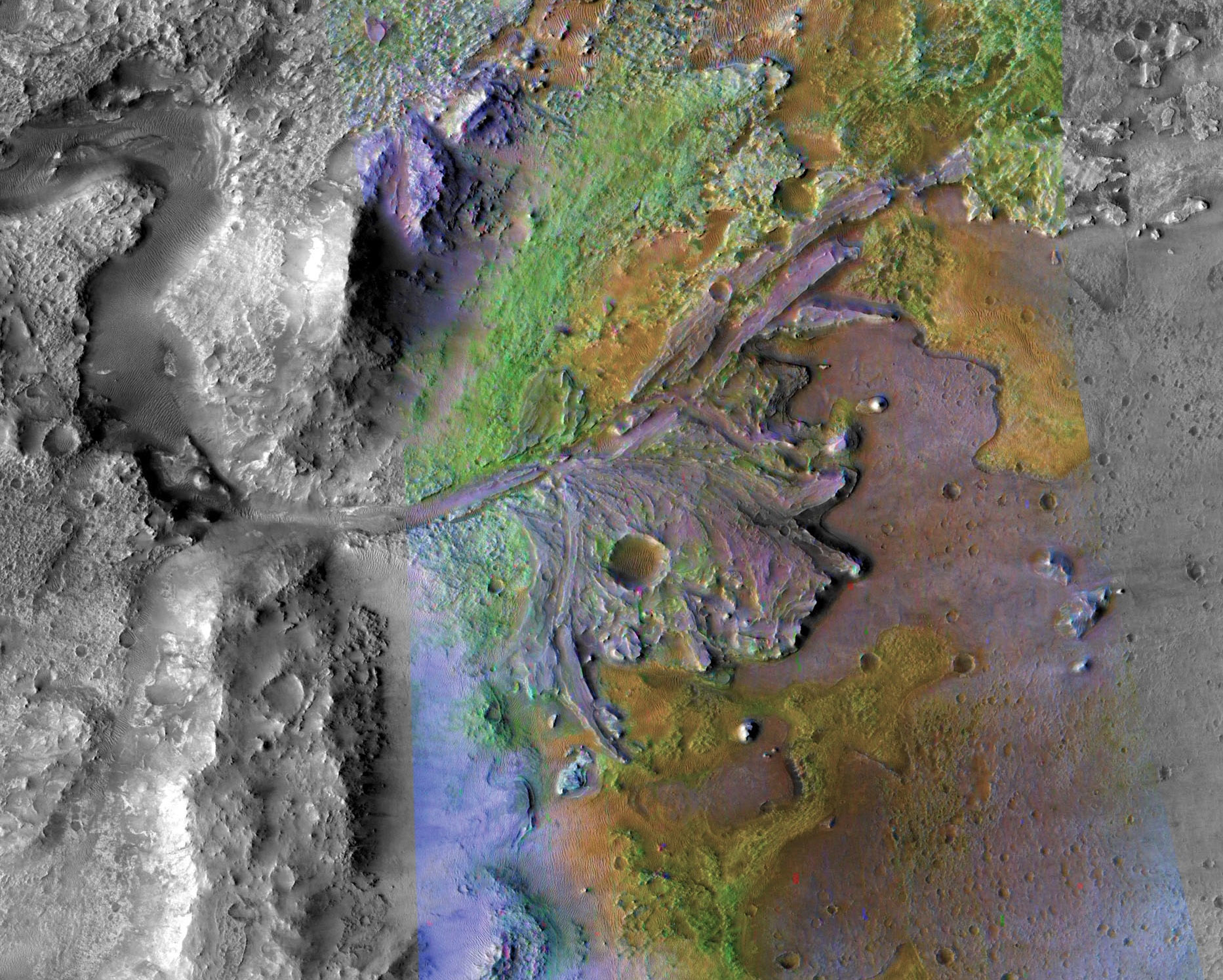
Jezero delta – chemical alteration by water

== Sister relationships ==
- Susami, Japan
