= Siege of Jajce (1463) =

Battle during the Ottoman conquest of Bosnia and Herzegovina

- Part of the Ottoman conquest of Bosnia and Herzegovina
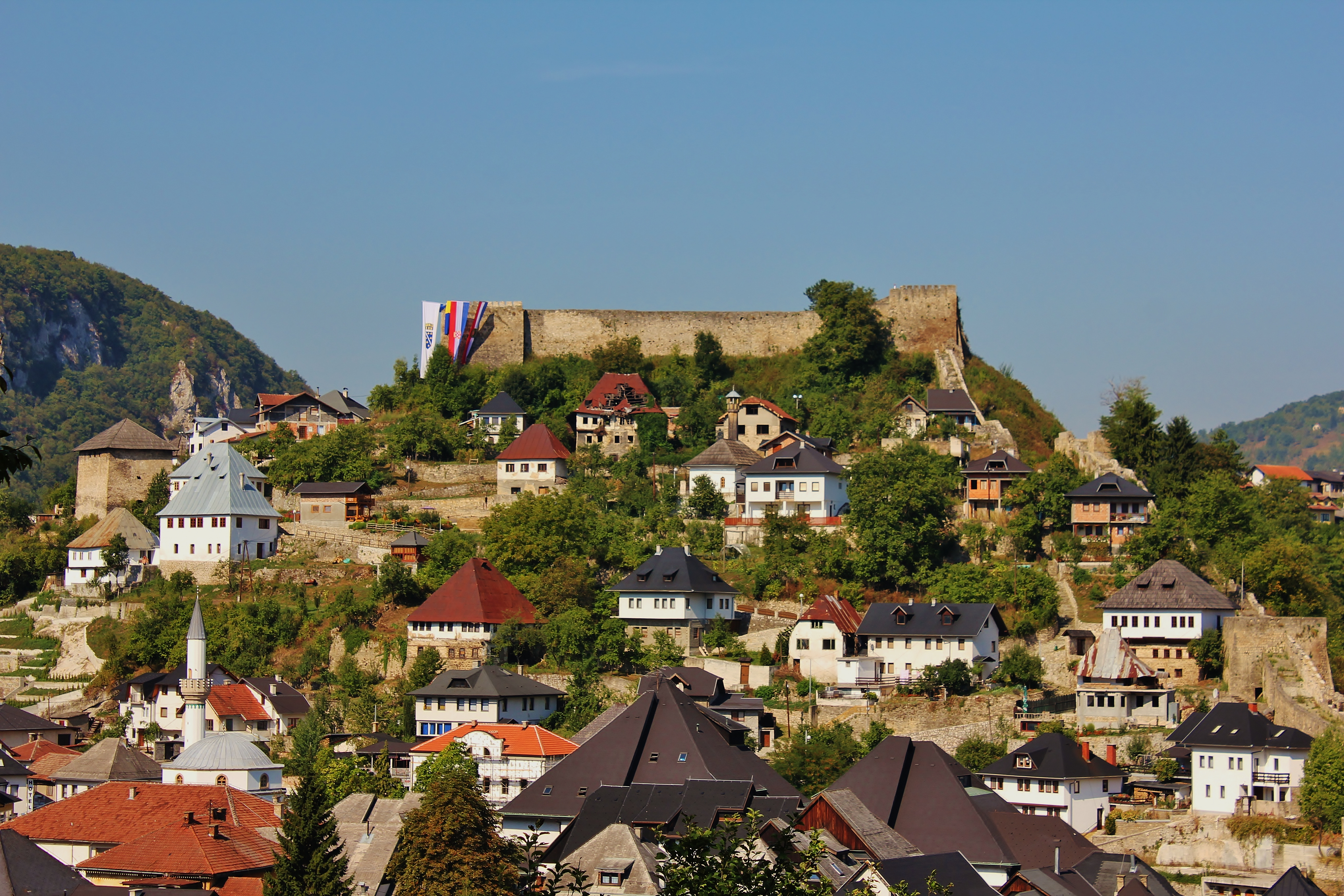
- Modern image of Jajce fortress.
Date	23 September – 25 December 1463
Location	Jajce Fortress, Ottoman Empire 44°20′22″N 17°16′13″E
Result	Hungarian victory
Territorial changes	Hungary incorporates Jajce and 60 other minor settlements into the newly formed Banate of Jajce

Belligerents
Kingdom of Hungary; Duchy of Saint Sava; Kingdom of Croatia; Republic of Venice; Republic of Ragusa (logistics, goods); Bohemian (Hussite) mercenaries	Ottoman Empire

Commanders and leaders
Matthias Corvinus	Mehmed Bey

Units involved
Black Army of Hungary; Venetian Arsenal	Ottoman Army

Strength
4,000 men-at-arms (Setton estimate); 25,000 (Bánlaky estimate); 14,000 cavalry 5,000 foot soldiers (Tošić estimate); 40 Venetian galleys (see note)	7,000 (Długosz estimate); 400 (Fessler estimate); 1,500–2,500 (Thallóczy estimate)
- Venice launched a diversion operation in the Ionian Sea but didn't participate in the siege.

The siege of Jajce was a siege of the town of Jajce and its citadel in 1463, in a push by Ottomans to conquer as much of the Bosnian Kingdom, and continuation of the Ottoman–Hungarian Wars. After the fall of Travnik and royal fortress of Bobovac, in the initial days of invasion, Ottomans, led by the Sultan, captured the town. One of the parties pursued Bosnian King Stjepan Tomašević, and caught up with him at Ključ fortress, after which he was brought to Jajce and executed. Soon the Ottomans forces withdrew, leaving the town under the protection of a small garrison. The Hungarian took the opportunity to capture the citadel; this meant that Ottoman advancement in Bosnia was halted for the time being. The northern part of Bosnia was brought under Hungarian control, and divided into three administrative regions, Banate of Jajce, Banate of Srebrenik, established around Srebrenik fortress, and a puppet statelet named "Bosnian Kingdom". This situation and Jajce under Hungarian garrison will last until 1527 when the Ottomans finally took the town, and breaking the lines advanced northward to Hungary and westward to Bihać, which was part of the Kingdom of Croatia.

== Background ==
Beginning from the diet of Buda of 1462 some Bosnian-Hungarian borderline fortresses were already guarded by the Kingdom of Hungary and King Stephen Tomašević of Bosnia was accepted as a vassal to her. The Bosnian King refused to pay tribute to the Porte thereafter. As a consequence both Ottoman and Christian sides began preparing for war.

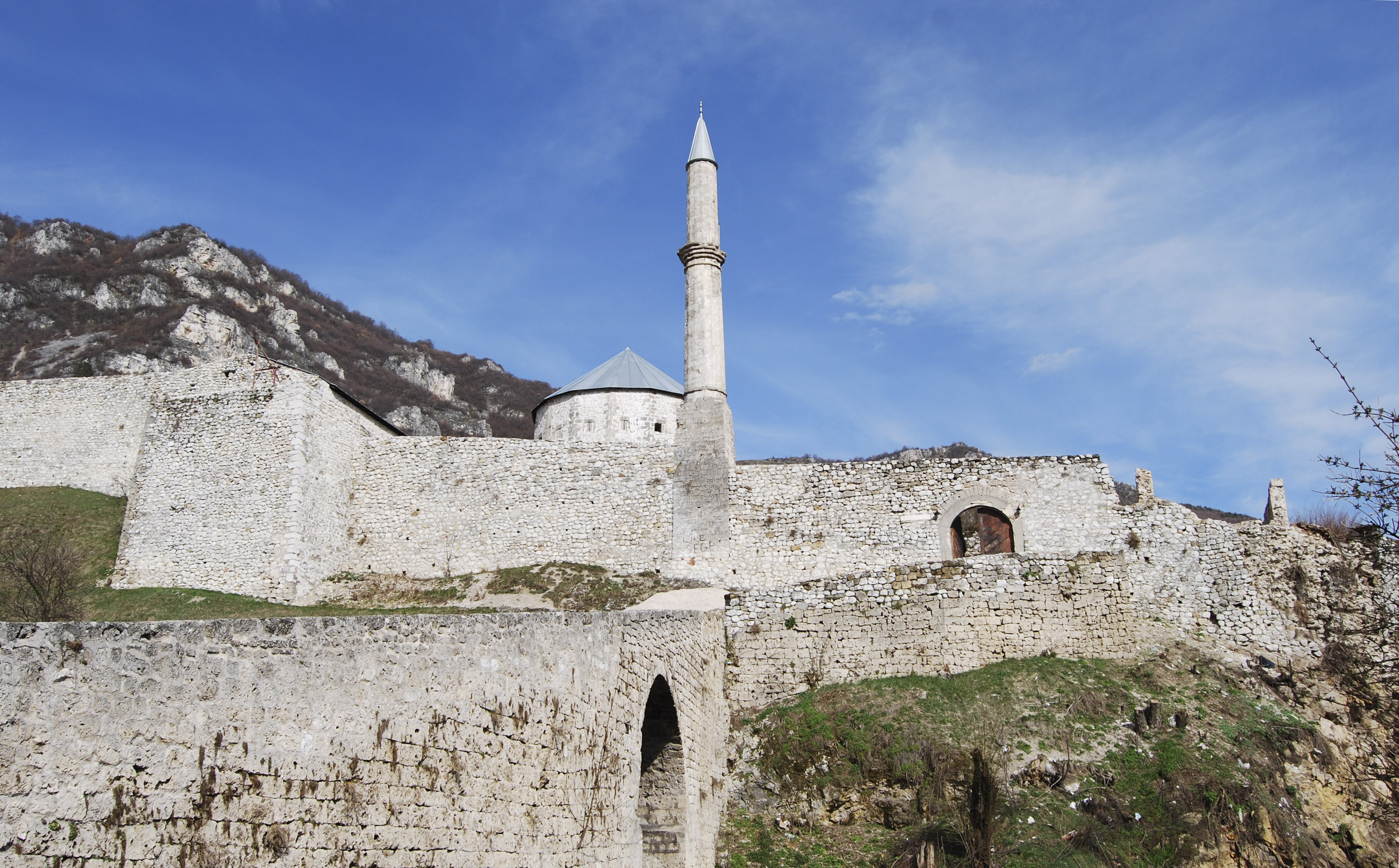
Travnik fortress

Sultan Mehmed II gathered an army of 150,000 soldiers in Adrianopolis and departed for the Lower Danube area in April 1463. As part of a diversionary attack, he commanded Ali Bey Mihaloğlu to invade southern parts of the Kingdom of Hungary. The bey crossed to Syrmia, but was pushed back by Andrew Pongrácz high cup-bearer of Hungary. He suddenly made a flanking move to the heart of Hungary until he reached Temesvár, where he ran into John Pongrácz Voivode of Transylvania and was defeated in a fierce battle. Meanwhile, Mehmet II advanced to Travnik, which he besieged. He then moved to the capital city Bobovac that fell within three days. Stephen Tomašević was advised to entrench himself in the high mountains, although he chose to withdraw to Jajce and later to Ključ and burnt the bridges of the roads along.

Remnants of Bobovac fortress

Turahanoğlu Ömer Bey pursued his trail taking Jajce without a fight and pushed to Ključ through the Sava river and the surrounding mountains despite the marshy ground and the general inaccessibility to the town. Seeing himself in a dead-end situation, Tomašević set his wife and mother to a journey through Raguse to Hungary to find refuge. He fortified himself in Ključ fortress. After their arrival the Ottomans set fire around the city, thus forcing the inhabitants to surrender in despair. Mahmud Pasha Angelović granted the Bosnian king. He swore an oath to the sultan and capitulated when he was promised safe retreat in return. He had to spread this agreement to the remaining fort captains in 8 days and as a result 70 places and one million florins were handed to the Porte. Discontent with this agreement, Mehmet rebuked Mahmud and instructed him to transport the Bosnian king to his court. Stephen Tomašević was double crossed and despite his oath to the Sultan, the last ruler of Bosnia was beheaded at Carevo Polje near Jajce.

The sultan divided his expeditionary army into three, one led by him, one by Ömer Bey, and one by Mahmud Pasha, respectively, and raided the surrounding countries as well as completed the conquest of Bosnia. Ömer Bey surged in the direction of the Kingdom of Croatia, while Mehmet moved towards the Hum. In Croatia Ömer Bey confronted and slew Paulus de Speranchich, Ban of Croatia, and his entourage of 800 men. With the help of the Krstjani, Stjepan Vukčić Kosača was able to withstand the intrusion of Mehmet for a short time, before sending his youngest son as a hostage to Istanbul, and ceding all of his lands to the north of Blagaj Fort to the Empire.

== Premise ==
Mehmet II chose not to engage in winter operations and retreated bringing 100,000 prisoners and leaving Mimert (Minnet) Bey in charge in Bosnia. He also didn't have any other choice as their horses were exhausted and the supply lines were inefficient. King Matthias Corvinus sent a couple thousand ecclesiastic army to the Lower Sava Valley and the Black Army of Hungary led by John Pongrácz de Dengeleg and supplemented by the Szeklers to the village of Keve. Matthias had a lot of Bohemian mercenaries. He also envoyed a garrison to his Adriatic subject, the Republic of Ragusa as a preventive measure. He also commissioned ambassadors to the Signoria of Venice and Pope Pius II. Both of them promised financial aid, the Holy See granted a sum sufficient for the military service payment of 1,000 cavalry for a year. Venice offered 20,000 ducats for the anti-Ottoman defense. Matthias ordered all dispensable transport points to sail to the enlist point at Petrovaradin. Matthias sought a long-term alliance with Venice. In 12 September just before the launch of the attack Matthias and Venetian orator John Emo met in the camp in Petrovaradin. The terms were:

- They form a mutual protective and offensive alliance against the Turks
- They don't conclude peace unbeknownst to the other
- The Republic of Venice provides 40 galleys and puts all of her Dalmatian and Peloponnese captains on a war footing
- The parties involved won't violate each other's territorial integrity

The lord of Hum, Stjepan Vukčić Kosača, hesitated between the Ottomans, Venice, and Hungary to be subjugated to. In October they came to the decision to offer themselves to Venice. Already an ally to Hungary the Doge of Venice, Cristoforo Moro gently replied that Hungary had already made the necessary steps to relieve Bosnia, her armies entered Bosnia and besieged Jajce as well as the other fortresses. Following the events Stjepan Vukčić Kosača lent himself to Matthias who accepted his service. In exchange Vladislav Hercegović was promoted to a Hungarian banner lord and reassured the estates of Stjepan. This ancillary alliance was signed on 6 December.

== Army composition ==
The Hungarian-led army included commanders Matthias Corvinus, John V. Kállay, George Parlagi, Paul Kállay I, provost Gaspar Bak, Matthias Geréb, Stephen Gerendi, Vladislav Hercegović, Bartholomew Drágffy, John Vitovecz, John Pongrácz de Dengeleg, Martin Frankopan, Stjepan Frankopan, Emeric Zápolya, Nicholas of Ilok, Michael Ország, Bishop John Vitéz, Bishop Janus Pannonius, and Stefan of Várad.

The Ottoman army included commanders Mehmed Bey Minnetoğlu, Ilyas Bey, Yusuf Bey, and Mustafa Bey, among others.

== Siege ==
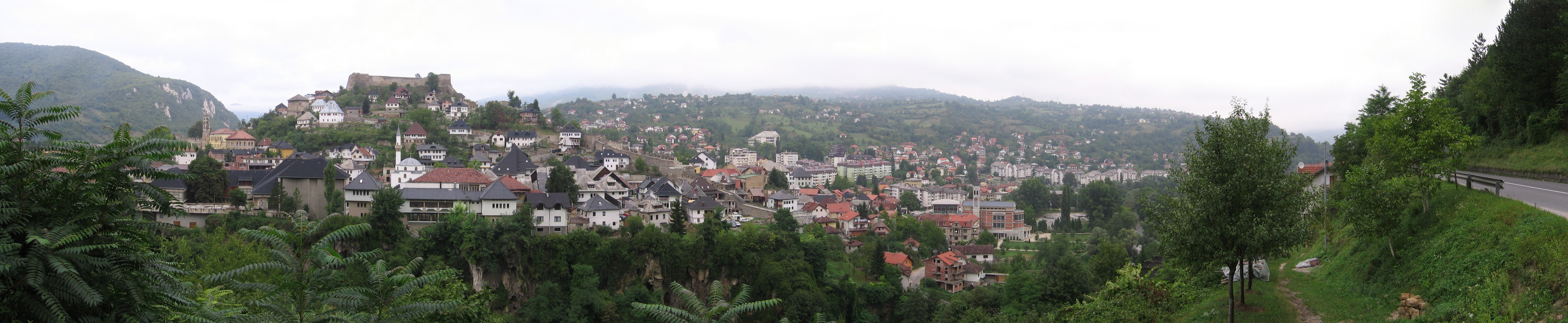
Present day Jajce fortress and the surrounding town

Corvinus branched off his army into two divisions. The first led by Emeric Zápolya was about to approach Jajce from the north along the Vrbas river, while the other led by Corvinus himself carried the siege weapons and chose the network of paved roads (kaldrma) from the north-west to Ključ, liberating each city connected. He appointed John Pongrácz de Dengeleg as the supplies overseer and provost Gaspar Bak of Berend as the ammunition/siege engines operator. The third contingent was recruited in Croatia, thus it arrived from the west in the direction of Bihać and was commanded by Martin Frankopan, while the reinforcements from Hum led by Duke Stjepan and his son Vladislav Hercegović blocked Jajce from the south (Prozor, Donji Vakuf). In November Matthias reached the town in a four-days march (on the 4th or 5th), which is considered quite a fast progress regarding the medieval infrastructure conditions. Upon the recent success among the Bosnian population, Corvinus anticipated local support and thus instantly attacked the town of Jajce on 5–6 October, subduing it on the first try. After a short hand-to-hand combat the Ottoman garrison locked itself in the Jajce Fortress.

The siege possibly started at the confluence of Pliva–Vrbas, and the siege machines were installed in the half-circle of Carevo Polje–Borci–Baščeluci. The cannons could cause little damage to the walls as their fire range varied from 300 to 900 meters, which was also the range covered by the defending Ottoman archers. Corvinus exhorted his troops by giving out letters of land donation to those who emerged in battle. In order to officially induct these manors he set up his own chancellery in the camp to administrate them. On the day of the planned general offensive the captains of the fortress called for surrender talks, which led to an agreement the same day. According to Thallóczy, those who wanted to leave could do so without their slaves, while the rest were free to join the Black Army; around 400 soldiers chose to be drafted into the Hungarian army, including the head captain Yusuf Bey.

== Aftermath ==
The smaller forts in the region were quickly recovered and were reorganized as a part of the Hungarian Banate of Jajce.

The main body of the Ottoman army besieged Jajce in July 1464, but the Hungarian defense held out until the Ottoman retreat in September 1464 due to the approaching of the Hungarian army.

Matthias Corvinus appointed John Székely of Hídvég as the new captain and Emeric Zápolya as the new governor of Bosnia. Vladislav Hercegović was awarded the counties (župe) of Gornji Vakuf-Uskoplje and Prozor-Rama.

King Matthias Corvinus also gifted the fortress of Medvedgrad to the Frangepans for their merits in the siege. Stephen Gerendi saved his life when he shot a waylaying Turk during the siege and thus was rewarded the right to bear personal coat of arms.

The Venetian–Ottoman conflict escalated into the Ottoman–Venetian War.

== See also ==
- Ottoman–Venetian War (1463–1479)
