= Siege of Jajce (1464) =

Date	10 July – 22 August 1464
Location	Jajce Fortress; Hungarian banate of Jajce (Note: Established in 1463 following Mathias' conquests in northern Bosnia with Jajce as its capital and entrusted to Emeric Zápolya as governor.) (modern-day Bosnia and Herzegovina)
Result	Hungarian victory

Belligerents
Ottoman Empire	Hungary

Commanders and leaders
Mehmed II; Mehmed Bey	Emeric Zápolya

Strength
30,000 men	Unknown

The siege of Jajce took place between 10 July and 22 August 1464, during the Ottoman conquest of Bosnia and Herzegovina, when an Ottoman army under Sultan Mehmed II made a new attempt to conquer Bosnia and take control of the strategic fortress of Jajce, south of Banja Luka, at the time under Hungarian control. (Note: The territory taken by the Hungarians in 1463 was made into a new Bosnian banate under Hungarian control and Hungarian governors)

Despite massive bombardment, the final Ottoman assault was heavily repulsed and after hearing that King Mathias of Hungary was approaching with a relief army, Mehmed abandoned the siege.

== Background ==
In 1463 Mehmed II invaded and occupied Bosnia, at the time under Hungarian suzerainty, executing its catholic King Stephen Tomašević, despite promising him safety if he surrendered.

In September 1463, under the aegis of Pope Pius II and the (Habsburg) Holy Roman Empire, Hungary and Venice (as well as Philip the Good's Duchy of Burgundy) forged an alliance to resist Ottoman Turkish conquests in Serbia. In December 1463 the strategic fortress of Jajce, south of Banja Luka, was retaken by King Matthias Corvinus of Hungary, John Hunyadi's son, after a siege that followed a counterattack into Bosnia in late September 1463.

After the reconquest of Jajce, numerous other Bosnian fortified towns opened their doors to the Hungarian troops. The part of Bosnia reconquered from the Ottomans was organized into a banate with Jajce as its capital and Emeric Zápolya as its governor.

== Battle ==
In July 1464, Ottoman Sultan Mehmed II, determined to take back Jajce, ordered a fresh offensive into Bosnia. Mehmed personally commanded a force including 30,000 men and a large siege train, including six stone throwing cannons.

The Ottoman army had probably set out from Edirne in late May according to C. Imber, 'since Malipiero dates the siege of Jajce to between 10 July and 24 August, and Enveri [...] also says that it began in July'.

The main body of the Ottoman army reached Jajce on 10 July 1464. In spite of more than six weeks of massive mining and bombardment, the Hungarian defence held up, managing to repulse Turkish attacks. On 22 August Mehmed ordered an assault for the next morning on three sides, following heavy casualties the Ottomans were again driven back. As news of King Corvinus' advance with a relief force from the Sava reached the Ottoman army, Mehmed II decided to abandon the baggage train, throw his cannons into the river, (Note: According to the Venetian Malipiero, following the unsuccessful siege the Ottomans discarded five siege cannons, each measuring '17 feet in length, into the River Vrbas to avoid them falling into the possession of the enemy.) and retreat to Sofia on 22 August (Note: or September) where the army wintered.

== Aftermath ==
Mehmed Bey Minnetoğlu was appointed the governor of Bosnia after this second siege of Jajce.

Although Hungarian forces successfully maintained control over Jajce and portions of northern Bosnia, the remaining territory succumbed to the Ottomans, who achieved complete dominance by 1483 after the fall of Herzegovina.

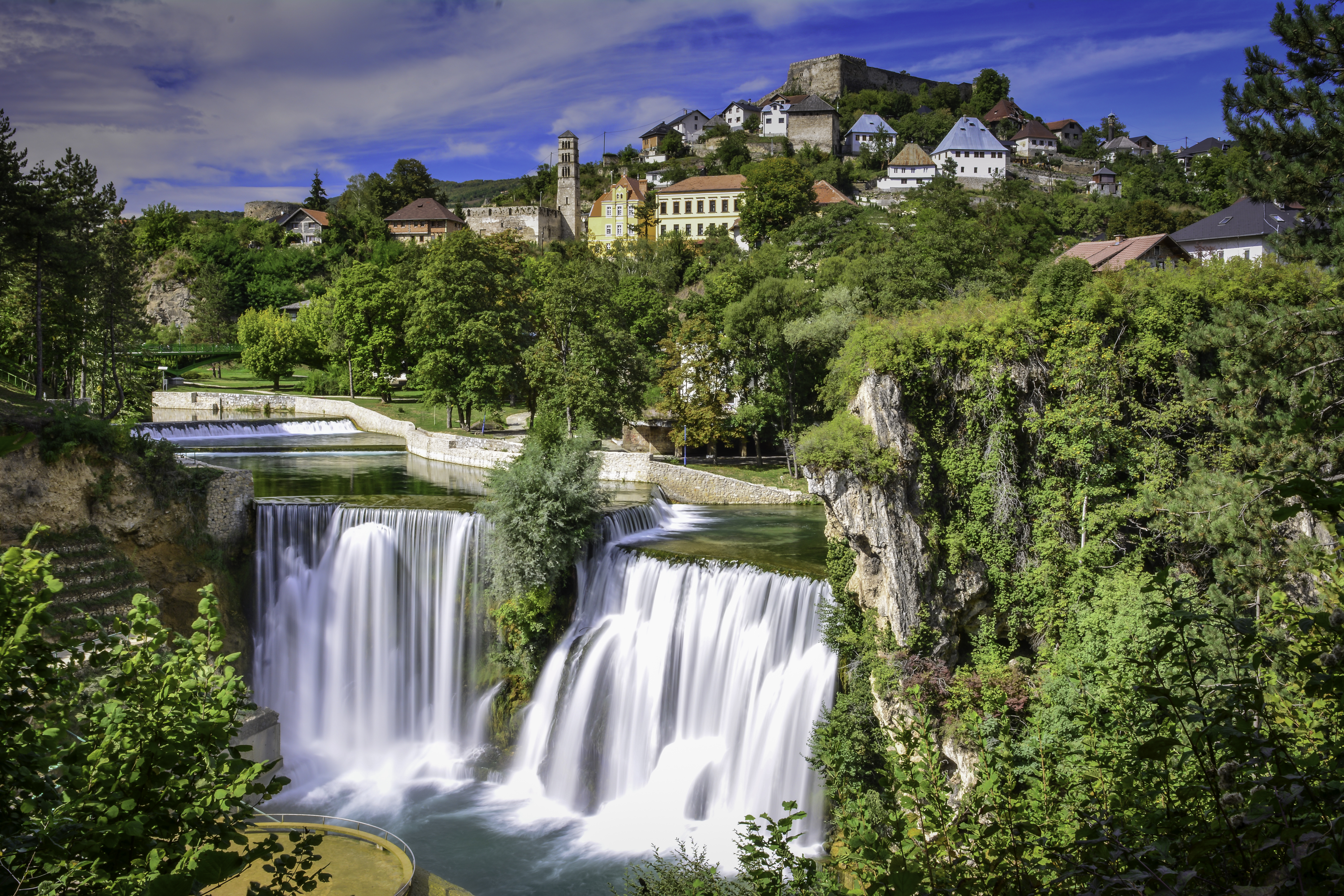
Waterwall and the citadel above Walled city of Jajce

== Sources ==
- Ágoston, G. (2023). The Last Muslim Conquest: The Ottoman Empire and Its Wars in Europe. Princeton University Press. ISBN 978-0-691-20539-7.
- Bideleux, R.; Jeffries, I. (2006). A History of Eastern Europe: Crisis and Change. Taylor & Francis. ISBN 978-1-134-71984-6.
- Hunyadi, Zsolt; Laszlovszky, József (2001). The Crusades and the Military Orders: Expanding the Frontiers of Medieval Latin Christianity. Central European University Press. Dept. of Medieval Studies. ISBN 963-9241-42-3.
- Imber, C. (2019). The Ottoman Empire, 1300-1650: The Structure of Power. Bloomsbury Publishing. ISBN 978-1-352-00414-4.
- Imber, Colin (1990). The Ottoman empire: 1300-1481. Isis. p. 190. ISBN 978-975-428-015-9.
- Kohn, G.C. (2006). Dictionary of Wars. Facts on File library of world history. Facts On File, Incorporated. ISBN 978-1-4381-2916-7.
- Molnár, M. (2001). A Concise History of Hungary. Cambridge University Press. ISBN 978-0-521-66736-4.
- Pálosfalvi, T. (2018). From Nicopolis to Mohács: A History of Ottoman-Hungarian Warfare, 1389-1526. The Ottoman Empire and its Heritage. Brill. ISBN 978-90-04-37565-9.
- Setton, Kenneth M. (1978). The Papacy and the Levant (1204–1571), Volume II: The Fifteenth Century. Vol. 2. Philadelphia: The American Philosophical Society. pp. –. ISBN 0-87169-127-2.
- Šabanović, Hazim (1959). Bosanski pašaluk: postanak i upravna podjela. Oslobodenje.
- Zsolt Hunyadi; József Laszlovszky; Central European University. Dept. of Medieval Studies (2001). The Crusades and the Military Orders: Expanding the Frontiers of Medieval Latin Christianity. Central European University Press. pp. 182–. ISBN 978-963-9241-42-8.
- Jaques, T.; Showalter, D.E. (2007). Dictionary of Battles and Sieges: F-O. Greenwood Press. ISBN 978-0-313-33538-9.
- Rudić, S.; Lovrenović, D.; Dragičević, P.; Beograd, I.; Sarajevu, F.U.; Banjaluci, F.U.; Isailović, N. (2015). Pad Bosanskog kraljevstva 1463. godine: = Fall of the Bosnian Kingdom in 1463. Zbornik radova / Istorijski institut Beograd. Историјски институт Београд. ISBN 978-86-7743-110-5.
- Van Antwerp Fine, J. (1987). The Late Medieval Balkans: A Critical Survey from the Late Twelfth Century to the Ottoman Conquest. ACLS Humanities E-Book. University of Michigan Press. ISBN 978-0-472-10079-8.
