= Battle of Ključ (1463) =

Ottoman victory in Bosnia

Battle of Kljuc
- Part of the Ottoman conquest of Bosnia and Herzegovina
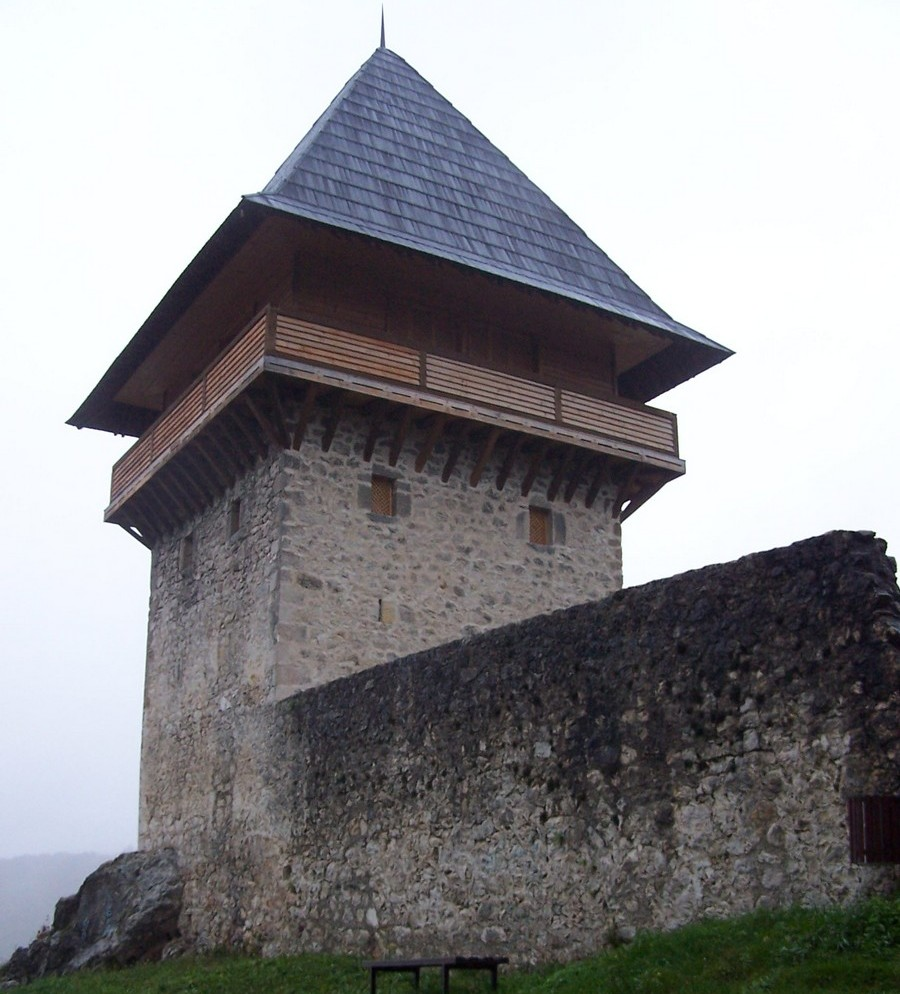
- Kljuc Castle
Date	1463
Location	Bosnia, Kljuc
Result	Ottoman victory: Fall of the Bosnian Kingdom

Belligerents
Ottoman Empire	Kingdom of Bosnia

Commanders and leaders
Mehmed the Conqueror; Mahmud Angelovıć; Turahanoğlu Ömer Bey	Stephen Tomašević (executed)

Strength
25,000	Unknown

The Battle of Kljuc was a pitched battle which took place during the conquest of Bosnia in 1463.

== Background ==
In the spring of 1463, Ottoman Sultan Mehmed the Conqueror gathered an army of 150,000 men in Adrianople and prepared to march towards Bosnia. Hearing that the Sultan had reached Babovac, the King of Bosnia, Stephen Tomašević, took his family and all his treasury with him and retired to the Jajce fortress. This former royal city was the scene of fierce conflicts between the forces of Mehmed the Conqueror and the last Bosnian King.

The Ottoman army under the leadership of Mahmud Pasha Angelović laid siege to Bobovac on 19 May, with the Sultan joining them the following day. Angelović was tasked with capturing the King. Confident that Babovac would resist, Tomašević planned to gather his army in Jajce and wait for help from the west. When news of Babovac's fall came, he realized that he could not put up a serious resistance, so he planned to flee either to Croatia or to Venice, but it was too late.

== Battle ==
While in Tvnornik, the Sultan learned that Tomašević was in the castle of Jajce. Thereupon, Grand Vizier Mahmud Pasha sent a force of 25,000 people to Jajce, the main center of Bosnia. Although Mahmud Pasha came to the Jajce castle quickly, he learned that Tomašević had fled to the town of Sokol. A captured prisoner stated that the King had locked himself in the castle of Ključ. Mahmud Pasha sent Ömer Bey to prevent him from escaping. The sighting of Ömer Bey in front of Kljuc did not surprise the Bosnian forces and the King who assumed that the real Turkish forces were far away. For this reason, Ömer Bey did not hesitate to meet his forces. When the Turkish raiders crossed the river in front of the castle and came to the town, they learned that the Bosnian King was holding the bridge over the river. A superior Bosnian force now surrounded Ömer Bey from all sides, so he had no choice but to accept the battle. Tomašević watched the battle unfold between his forces and the raiders from the castle and Mahmud Pasha would also eventually come to the riverside to witness it. Seeing this, some of the Turks could not find the patience to go up to the bridge and started to swim across the river. The situation became reversed and Tomašević's forces fled the battle, taking refuge in the castle.

Eager to capture him, Angelović had his messengers solemnly promise the King that he would be done no harm if he surrendered, and sent him a document guaranteeing him freedom. With food supplies and ammunition running short, Stephen decided to surrender himself and his garrison to Angelović. Angelović, in turn, brought him, his uncle Radivoj and 13-year-old cousin Tvrtko before Mehmed in Jajce.

== Aftermath ==
Stephen sought to ingratiate himself with Mehmed by sending out orders to commanders and castellans to surrender, enabling his captor to take command of more than 70 towns in one week. Mehmed, however, had no intention of sparing Stephen's life and summoned him on 25 May. Stephen fearfully brought Angelović's document, but Mehmed's Persian-born mullah, Ali al-Bistami, issued a fatwah declaring that the Sultan was not bound to keep the promise made by his servant without his knowledge. As if to demonstrate the validity of his fatwah, the elderly mullah took out his sword and beheaded Stephen in front of Mehmed. The chronicler Benedetto Dei, who claimed to have been part of the Sultan's retinue, recorded that Mehmed himself decapitated Stephen.

== Sources ==
- Babinger, Franz (1978). Mehmed the Conqueror and His Time. Princeton University Press. ISBN 9780691010786.
- Ćirković, Sima (1964). Историја средњовековне босанске државе (in Serbo-Croatian). Srpska književna zadruga.
- Ljubez, Bruno (2009), Jajce Grad: prilog povijesti posljednje bosanske prijestolnice (in Serbo-Croatian), HKD Napredak
- Miller, William (1923), The Cambridge Medieval History, Volume 4, Cambridge University Press
- Tansel, Selahattin (2014). Osmanlı Kaynaklarına Göre Fatih Sultan Mehmed'in Siyasi ve Askeri Faaliyeti (in Turkish). Türk Tarih Kurumu Yayınları. ISBN 9789751610812.
- Uzunçarşılı, İsmail Hakkı; Karal, Enver Ziya (1983). Osmanlı tarihi: cilt. 2. kısım. Uzunçarşılı İ. H. XVIII. yüzyıl (in Turkish). Türk Tarih Kurumu Basımevi.
