= Franciscan friary, Jajce =

Monastery of Saint Luke
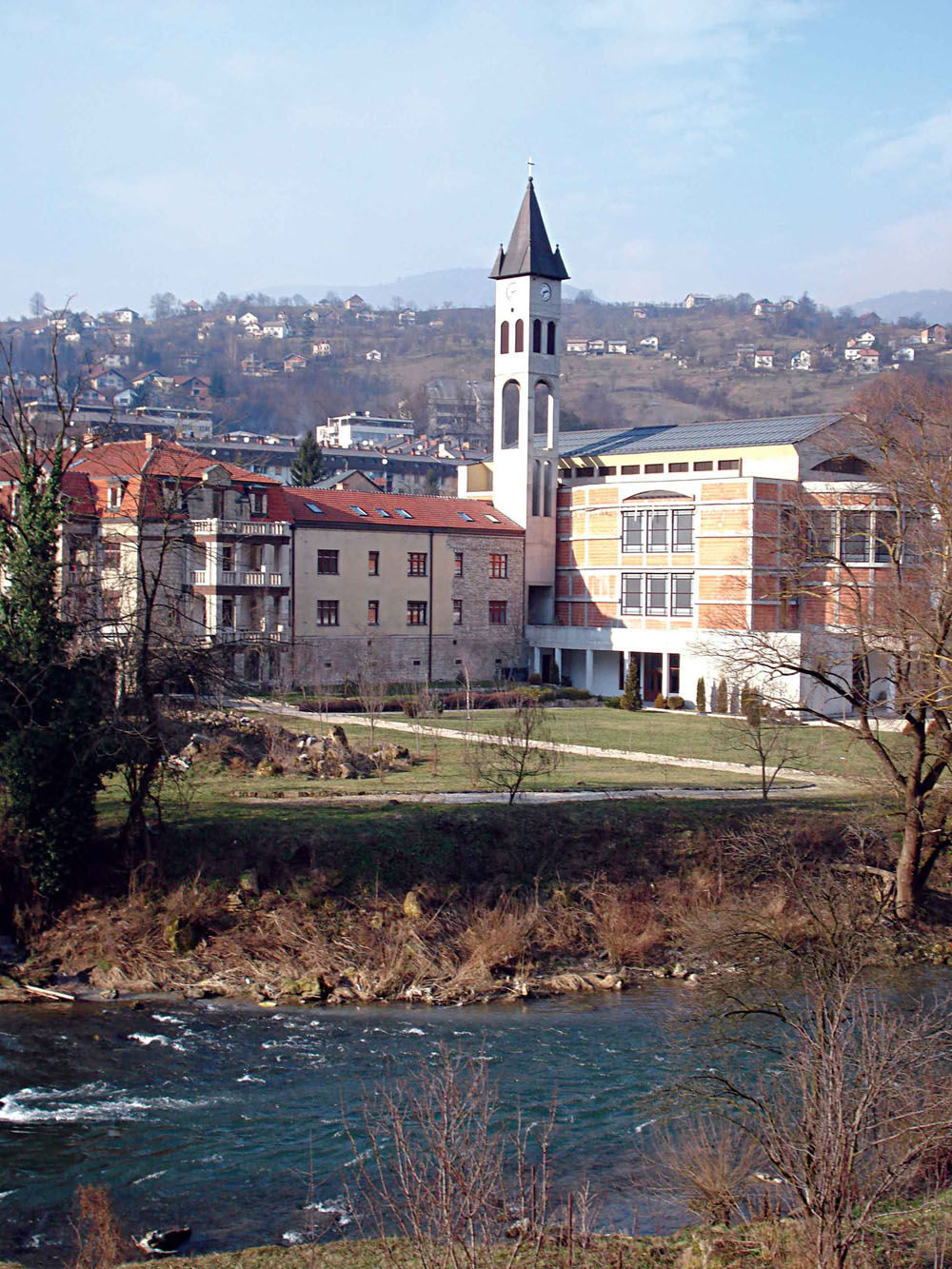

- Location within Bosnia and Herzegovina
- Interactive map of Monastery of Saint Luke

Monastery information
- Order: Franciscan
- Established: 1885
- Dedication: Saint Luke
- Diocese: Banja Luka
- Controlled churches: Church of the Assumption

Site
- Location: Jajce, Bosnia and Herzegovina
- Coordinates: 44°20′28.2″N 17°16′26.1″E

Franciscan monastery of Saint Luke is a Franciscan monastery in Jajce, Bosnia and Herzegovina. The construction began in 1877 and finished in 1885. In 1934-1935 the monastery was renovated by Karel Pařík. Franciscans in the 1970s tried to return the bones of St. Luke in Jajce, and since then the monastery carries the name of this evangelist.

== History ==
Franciscans were present in Jajce from the Middle Ages, it is known that they had the St. Mary's Church with the St Luke's bell tower in the 15th century. The church was turned into a mosque at the arrival of the Turks. The bell tower is fully preserved, while the church was burnt down many times and now it is just a ruin.

In 1888, the archeologist Ćiro Truhelka excavated a male skeleton with the skull separated from the body. The excavation was made on a hill that is called Kraljev grob (King's tomb) in Zastinje near Jajce, under a stećak. Although there is no direct evidence, it is believed that the skeleton belongs to Stephen Tomašević, the last king of Bosnia, who was executed in 1463. The skeleton lies in the monastery.

The monastery has many artworks, like the St. Family with St. John the Baptist picture that was made in the 17th century by an unknown Italo-Greek artist. Also, there are many other items that are culturally and artistically significant. In particular there is the old Gothic silver chalice from the 16th century.

There are also historical items, such as many Roman monuments found in Šipovo and many Early Christian and Medieval monuments.

The monastery has a small library with many valuable books, magazines and manuscripts from the 18th and 19th century.

The monastery has suffered during the Bosnian War. The monastery church was completely destroyed, it is also missing a lot of valuable monuments, artworks and books. Currently, the old part of the monastery is being renewed.
