= Antun Knežević =

Bosnian Franciscan friar, historian and writer

Fra Antun Knežević OFM
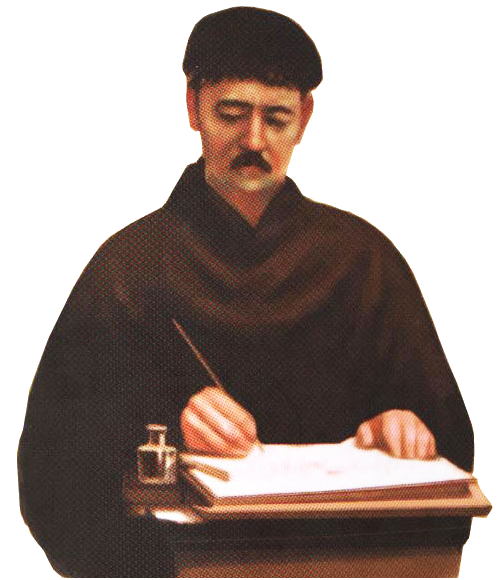
- Born: 9 January 1834; Varcar Vakuf, Bosnia Eyalet, Ottoman Empire
- Died: 22 September 1889 (aged 55); Kotor Varoš, Condominium of Bosnia and Herzegovina, Austro-Hungarian Empire
- Resting place: Jajce, Bosnia and Herzegovina
- Citizenship: Ottoman, Austro-Hungarian
- Occupation: Franciscan friar
- Writing career
- Language: Bosnian
- Genres: Social science, poetry
- Subjects: History, culture
- Notable works: Rieč popa Gojka Miroševića svojem Bošnjakom i Hercegovcem; Rieč Hodže bosanskog Hadži Muje Mejovića; Suze bošnjaka nad grobnicom kralja svoga u Jajcu; Krvava knjiga; Opet o grobu bosanskom; Kratka povjest kralja bosanski; Pad Bosne; Varica
- Movement: Illyrian

Fra Antun Knežević (9 January 1834 – 22 September 1889) was a Bosnian Franciscan friar, historian and writer from Varcar Vakuf (now Mrkonjić Grad), Bosnia and Herzegovina. He was a proponent of Bosnian national identity, while being an active member of the Illyrian Movement.

== Early life and education ==
Born in Varcar Vakuf (today Mrkonjić Grad) in 1834, his father Anto came from the town of Uskoplje, and his mother was Agata Stipić (née Ivekić) from Varcar Vakuf. His father died early, and he was raised by his uncle from his father's side, Fra Grgo Knežević, who was buried in Ivanjska village.

Fra Antun Knežević studied in Fojnica, Rome, and Siena and became friar on 26 April 1851. His first Mass was on 21 September 1856.

== Views, opinions and engagements ==
Antun Knežević was one of the main proponents of Bosnian nationhood, and he opposed efforts he viewed as aligning Bosnian Catholics with Croat national identity and Bosnian Orthodox with Serbian identity, as he called them Catholic Bosnians and Orthodox Bosnians in his work. His position and doctrine was that all Bosnians are one people of three faiths and that up to the late 19th century, the population of Bosnia and Herzegovina did not identify as Croat or Serb. Although Knežević was not a unique phenomenon in this sense, he was certainly among the most articulate, having a strong impact along with Fra Ivan Franjo Jukić from whom he took the idea, and who was his teacher and mentor earlier in his life. Since the 17th century, many other members of the Franciscan order in Bosnia accepted the idea of a Bosnian identity, nurturing it within the brotherhood and carrying it over into the 18th and 19th centuries. But it was these two, Knežević and his mentor, Jukič, who left the deepest mark on Bosnian culture and history, while championing the notion that Catholics, Orthodox and Muslims are one nation, and Bosnia and Herzegovina a country with deep cultural and historical roots. Like Jukić before him, Knežević too consistently expressed a national identity that he defined as Bosnian, inclusive of all three major religious groups in Bosnia and Herzegovina. The only other cultural identity he recognized was Illyrian, as a cultural supra-identity of all South Slavs, on which all his interest and activity as a member of the Illyrian movement was based. Knežević opposed foreign rule in Bosnia and Herzegovina, including both Ottoman administration and Austro-Hungarian occupation after 1878.

Knezević, in 1877, started the construction of the Franciscan monastery in Jajce without permission. He is credited with opening one of the earliest public schools in Bosnia, which operated from his residence.

=== Service ===
- Curate and teacher in Varcar Vakuf (Mrkonjić Grad) 1857
- Curate in Bugojno 1858
- Curate in Varcar Vakuf 1864
- Tutor and professor at Franciscan Youth in Livno 1861–1864
- Lector of theology in Guča Gora 1864
- Vicar in Dobretićimi 1868
- Spiritual leader of youth in Đakovo 1868
- Vicar in Varcar Vakuf 1873
- Vicar in Ivanjska 1873
- Vicar in newly built monastery in Petrićevac 1875
- Vicar in Jajce 1876–1879
- Started the groundwork and laid the foundation for the monastery in Jajce 1882, officially opened 1886
- Vicar in Liskovica 1884–1886
- Vicar in Kotor Varoš 1889

== Death ==
Knežević died on 22 September 1889 in Kotor Varoš while celebrating a folk Mass. His bones were transferred to Jajce in 1955. Later friars of Jajce monastery moved the bones of Fra Antun Knežević to the nearby, new church of the Assumption of the Blessed Virgin Mary in Jajce.

== Bibliography ==
- Rieč popa Gojka Miroševića svojem Bošnjakom i Hercegovcem
- Rieč Hodže bosanskog Hadži Muje Mejovića
- Mladić bosanski proviđen u svojoj učionici za prvu godinu
- Rieč hodže Petrovačkog bratiji Turcima
- Suze bošnjaka nad grobnicom kralja svoga u Jajcu
- Krvava knjiga
- Opet o grobu bosanskom
- Kratka povjest kralja bosanski
- Pad Bosne
- Carsko - turski namjesnici u Bosni i Hercegovini
- Povjesnica novoimenovanog Franjevačkog samostana u Jajcu I-III
- Varica

=== Letters ===
- Letter to Béni Kállay

== See also ==
- Franciscan Province of Bosna Srebrena
