= Jagoda Truhelka =

Croatian novelist and pedagogue

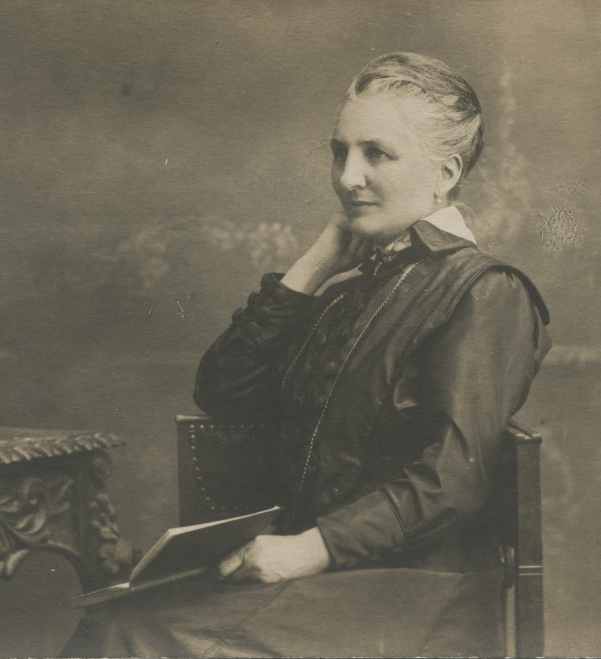
- Truhelka, c. 1916
- Born: 5 February 1864; Osijek, Kingdom of Slavonia, Austrian Empire (now Osijek, Croatia)
- Died: 17 December 1957 (aged 93); Zagreb, FPR Yugoslavia (now Zagreb, Croatia)
- Occupations: writer, novelist, teacher
- Relatives: Ćiro Truhelka (brother)

Jagoda Truhelka (Croatian pronunciation: [jâːɡoda trǔxeːlka]; 5 February 1864 – 17 December 1957) was a Croatian novelist and pedagogue. A native of Slavonia, Truhelka worked as teacher and headmistress in Osijek, Zagreb, Gospić, Banja Luka, and Sarajevo. Her novels are notable for focusing on female characters and discussing women's rights, but Truhelka is best known for her children's literature.

== Family and education ==
Truhelka was born on 5 February 1864 in Osijek, capital of the Kingdom of Slavonia, Austrian Empire. She was the eldest of three children of Marija (née Schön) and Antun Vjenceslav Truhelka. Her parents were both immigrants to Slavonia; her father, a teacher, was a Czech, and her mother was a Danube Swabian. She attended a gymnasium in Osijek. After her father's death in 1878, Truhelka moved to Zagreb, now capital of the new Austro-Hungarian Kingdom of Croatia-Slavonia, with her mother and younger brothers, Dragoš and Ćiro Truhelka.

Truhelka continued her education in Zagreb, intending to follow in her father's footsteps. She received her teacher's diploma in 1882.

== Teaching career ==
Truhelka got her first job soon after receiving her diploma in 1882, teaching girls in Osijek. Following further education, she was appointed headmistress of a girls' school in Gospić, where she worked for seven years. She accepted a new job in Zagreb in 1892. The fin de siècle Zagreb was a stimulating cultural and intellectual environment for a teacher who had thus far worked in the province. She spent nine years there, building a reputation as a capable teacher and defying prejudice against the education of women by enrolling, along with three other women, into the University of Zagreb. During this period, Truhelka was influenced by the ideas of individualism and universal freedom, as well as by the promotion of education and women's rights.

In 1901, Truhelka moved to Banja Luka, in the Austro-Hungarian-occupied Bosnia-Herzegovina, where she worked as a girls' school headmistress for ten years. During her subsequent work as teacher in Sarajevo, Bosnia-Herzegovina's capital, Truhelka was particularly active in promoting women's rights.

== Women's writer and activist ==
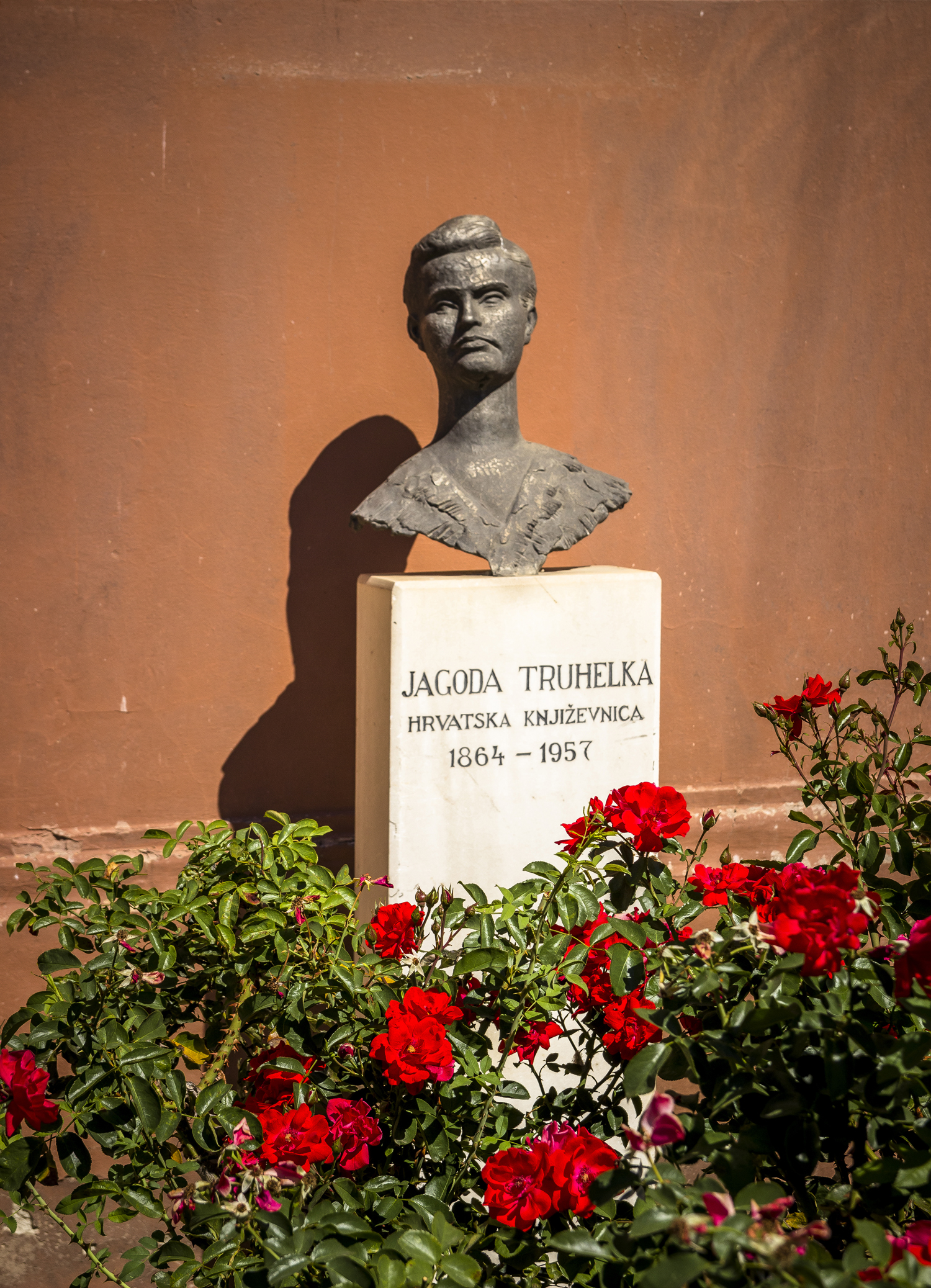
Sculpture in Osijek

Truhelka considered herself foremostly an educator, emphasizing her education and training; writing was something that "came on its own, unintended, unprepared, and unassuming". She published a dozen novellas, several short stories, and two novels. In 1900, Jagoda Truhelka and Marija Jambrišak launched the magazine Domaće ognjište (The Home Hearth), which attracted significant contribution from other women writers. Antun Gustav Matoš said that the magazine was of "inestimable importance" because it was "not only a pedagogical paper but also a women's paper". Truhelka was at that time at the centre of a network of female activists in Zagreb, and ran a joint household with one of those women for 30 years.

As her early prose revolved around women and the relations between the sexes, Truhelka published a part of her stories in the magazines Vienac and Nada under the pseudonym A. M. Sandučić. Most were simple love stories set in contemporary Zagreb or Vienna, but with a prominent psychological development of female characters. Truhelka was the first Croatian author to feature a female character who is a feminist and who is intellectually superior to others rather than simply idealized or demonized.

Truhelka published several installments of a psychological novel titled Plein air in the Sarajevo-based Nada in 1897. In the novel, she discussed women's rights, marriage and social stereotypes. The literary critic Lidija Dujić described Truhelka's female characters as unconvincing, with the exception of the protagonist of Plen air. Plen air, now a largely forgotten novel, features the artist Zlata Podravac, who stands out because of her intellect. Truhelka's historical fiction novel Vojača was published in Nada in 1899. It also featured a female protagonist, the 15th-century Bosnian peasant modeled after the Bosnian queen Vojača. Truhelka's Vojača is highly sensible, vulnerable and thoughtful, and the first antiheroine in Croatian literature. The novel, in which she follows both traditional and modernist approaches, reveals that Truhelka was inspired by August Šenoa.

== Children's literature ==
Later in her career, as the modernism faded, Truhelka focused on children's literature, which often contained autobiographical elements. Zlatni danci was published in 1918. Upon her retirement in August 1923, Truhelka returned to Zagreb, by then the second largest city of Yugoslavia, and withdrew from public life. She continued her work on children's literature into advanced old age. Bogorodičine trešnje and Crni i bijeli dani were published in 1929 and 1944 respectively. These two, along with Zlatni danci, place her among the most prominent Croatian children's writers, second only to Ivana Brlić-Mažuranić. Portraying the everyday lives of children, Truhelka strived to include ethical, religious and patriotic lessons.

In her retirement, Truhelka rarely made reference to women's rights and notable women. She died in Zagreb on 17 December 1957, aged 93. She remains best known for her children's literature.
