= Marija Jambrišak =

Croatian writer, educator (1847–1937)

Marija Jambrišak (September 5, 1847 – January 23, 1937) was a Croatian writer, educator, and women's rights activist. She worked to improve women's status in Croatian society, including through producing biographies of notable female figures, launching the women's magazine Domaće ognjište, and helping found a girls' school in Zagreb.

== Early life and education ==
Marija Jambrišak was born in Karlovac, in what is now Croatia, in 1847. At age six, she moved with her family to Zagreb. Her father died shortly after the family's move, and her mother struggled to support the family. It is thought that this experience motivated Jambrišak's later advocacy for women's empowerment.

She attended a two-year teachers' school run by the Sisters of Mercy of St. Vinko Paulski in Zagreb, graduating in 1863. She then taught in Varaždin and Krapina through the end of the decade.

By 1871, Jambrišak had already become a forceful advocate for secular education for women. At that year's General Teachers' Assembly in Zagreb, she spoke in favor of equal pay and equal treatment for female teachers, who worked under very different conditions than their male counterparts. She also raised the need for financial support for teachers' professional development, and the problems with placing nuns in secular teaching positions.

She subsequently traveled to Vienna, where she became the first Croatian woman to study at Friedrich Dittes' Pedagogium, a teachers' college there. She had been personally invited to study there by Dittes, who had been impressed by her speech at the General Teachers' Assembly. In 1874, she became the first woman to graduate from the school. Her education was of the utmost importance to her, and she would often go without food to be able to afford her textbooks.

== Career ==
After returning to Zagreb, Jambrišak taught at the Girls' High School from 1875 until 1892. That year, she began teaching at the Women's Lyceum, an institution she was instrumental in founding. She would continue to teach at the Lyceum until her retirement in 1912, serving as director from 1905 onward. Her work was heavily influenced by the pedagogical methods and theories she learned through her formal education at the Pedagogium in Vienna, where she was the first female student. She was a proponent of secular education, individualized instruction, and abolishing corporal punishment.

In her work as educator and writer, Jambrišak worked to counter the prevailing stereotype that women lacked creativity and intellectual capacities. She aimed to elevate women's educational and social status in Croatian society, fighting for women's rights and their role in public life. As a writer, she published articles in various magazines including Napredak, Školski prijatelj, Obzor, and Narodne novine. She wrote a major collection of women's biographies, Znamenite žene iz priče i poviesti ("Notable Women in Literature and History"), which was published in three volumes in 1883, 1885, and 1887. Other notable works she produced included the books O ženskom uzgoju ("On Female Upbringing," 1892) and O pristojnom vladanju ("On Decent Manners," 1895).

In 1900, she launched the women's magazine Domaće ognjište ("The Home Hearth") in partnership with Jagoda Truhelka, serving as its editor. The publication became an important space for women's writing in Croatia. Some scholars have cited it as the first women's magazine in Croatia, although there is still some dispute over this. The magazine was targeted at educated women, but it was not wholly progressive as it tended to focus on the message that women would best serve their society by being good mothers and educating the future generations.

== Personal life ==
Jambrišak herself had no children, but she raised and cared for the children of her brother Janko, who had died young. She died in Zagreb in 1937, at age 89.
