= Ćiro Truhelka =

Croatian archeologist and historian

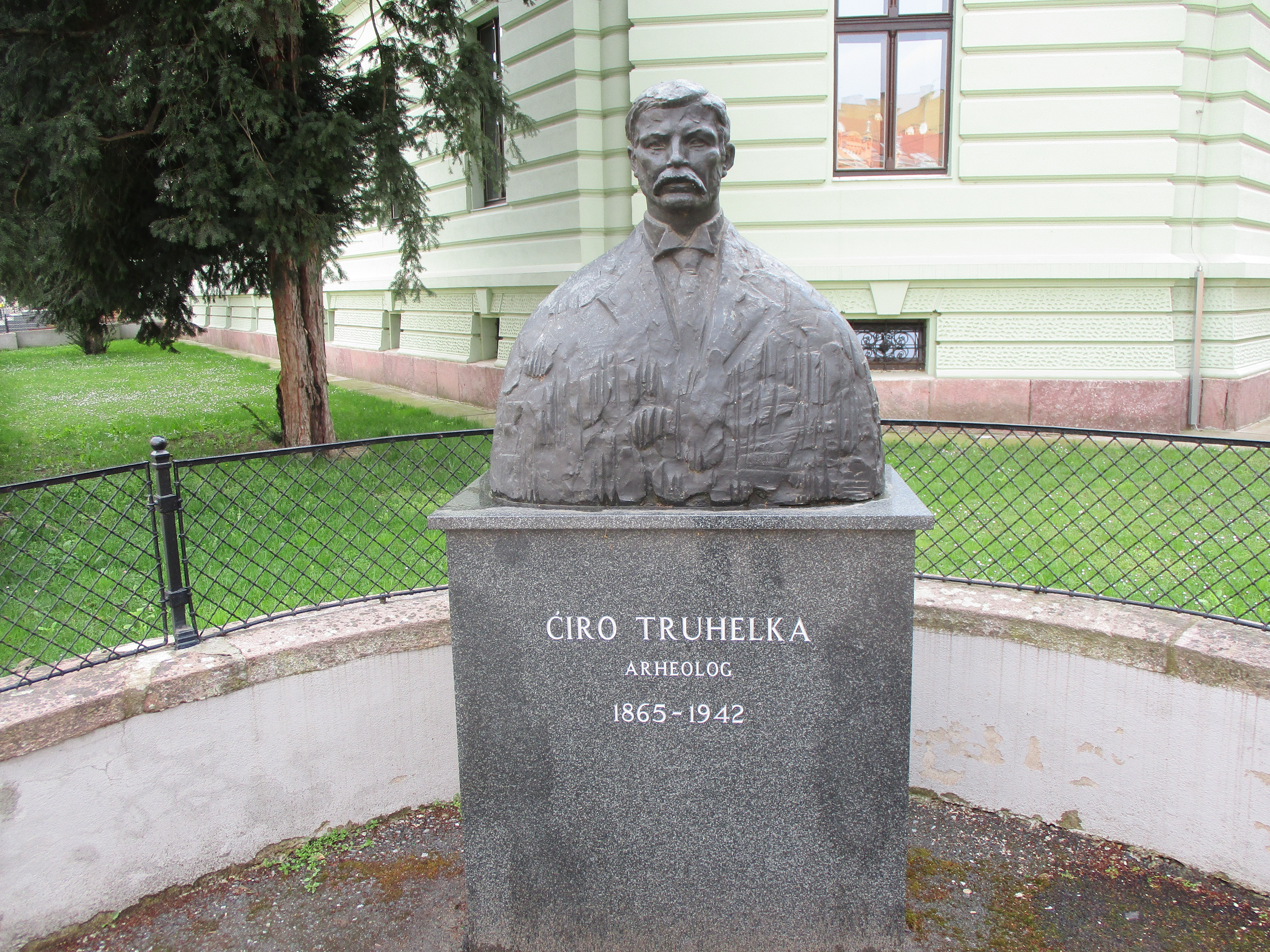
- Bust of Truhelka in Osijek
- Born: 2 February 1865; Osijek, Kingdom of Slavonia, Austrian Empire
- Died: 18 September 1942 (aged 77); Zagreb, Independent State of Croatia
- Education: University of Zagreb
- Relatives: Jagoda Truhelka (sister)
- Scientific career
- Workplaces: National Museum of Bosnia and Herzegovina; University of Skopje

Ćiro Truhelka (2 February 1865 – 18 September 1942) was a Croatian archeologist, historian, and art historian who devoted much of his professional life to the study of the history of Bosnia and Herzegovina. He wrote about prehistory, Roman and medieval history (most notably its numismatics), Ottoman and Turkish documents from the region, stećci, and Bosnian Cyrillic. He was also engaged in albanology. He was the first curator of the National Museum of Bosnia and Herzegovina.

== Early life and education ==
Ćiro Truhelka was born on 2 February 1865 in Osijek to Antun Vjenceslav and Marija (née Schön) Truhelka. His father was of Czech and mother of German origin. He finished elementary school in Osijek after which he enrolled in high school that he eventually finished in Zagreb where he moved after his father's death along with his mother and siblings, Dragoš and Jagoda Truhelka. In youth, he showed interest in painting and technical sciences, but because of his family's poor financial situation, he opted for the study of philosophy at the University of Zagreb which lasted three years. He chose art history and history as main subjects. He received his doctorate in 1885 with the dissertation "Andrija Medulić: His Life and Work".

== Professional career ==
As a student, Truhelka worked with Izidor Kršnjavi at the Strossmayer Gallery of Old Masters and made institutions' first catalog (1885). In 1886, he became secretary of the Museum Society for Bosnia and Herzegovina and the first curator of the National Museum of Bosnia and Herzegovina. His task was preparing Museum's opening in 1888. He was only 21 years old when he came to Sarajevo, where he lived for 40 years. In the Museum he managed the ethnographic, prehistoric, and medieval collections, but as there were not many experts, he took care of all museum collections except those from the field of natural sciences. As a curator, Truhelka arranged Bosnian pavilions at exhibitions in Budapest (1896), Brussels (1897) and Paris (1900). In 1905, he succeeded Kosta Hörmann as director of the National Museum and editor of the Gazette of the National Museum of Music (until 1920). Thanks to him, in 1913, the National Museum got a new building. He retired in 1922, but in 1926 he come out of retirement as he was appointed a professor of archeology and art history at the University of Skopje, Macedonia until 1931. He served as the president of the Zagreb branch of the Society of Bosnian Croats.

Truhelka made an outstanding contribution to the study of the history of Bosnia and Herzegovina. Work at the Museum influenced his various interests. He was engaged in the excavation of archaeological sites, Ilyrian graves and castles on prehistoric necropolises at Glasinac, a penitentiary settlement in Donja Dolina, a prehistoric cult edifice in Gorica near Posušje, and also dug up the early Christian basilica in Zenica and warned of the phenomenon of "Bosnian churches" and their early Christian background, explored the localities in the valley of Lašva river and around Stolac, the medieval Jajce and many other medieval cities. This brought him the recognition of the anthropological congress in Vienna and membership in the Society. In the field of ethnology, he worked on an ethnographic collection and gave an overview of the national life in Bosnia and Herzegovina. Truhelka made many important findings about pre-Ottoman Bosnia and Herzegovina, and gave a significant contribution to the research of the history of medieval Bosnia by the study of stećaks, material culture, bosančica, topography, numismatics, political, social and religious situation. He also proposed that a grave he found on Vran mountain belongs infect to a Diva Grabovčeva, a 17th century legendary heroin and a virgin in Prozor-Rama local oral tradition, thus claiming that he confirmed the myth. However, the legend was never verified in local or any other written sources, and her existence was neither recorded in chronicles of the local Franciscan friary, Šćit nor its martyrology. In 1888, Truhelka excavated the mortal remains of a decapitated male at the location called Kraljev Grob (transl. King's Grave) near Jajce, which he proposed are remains of king Stjepan Tomašević. Although never confirmed, these remains are now housed in the Franciscan friary, Jajce. Truhelka studied the Albanian and Turkish languages for his researches.

In addition, his sister Jagoda Truhelka was a renowned Croatian writer.

== Controversy ==
In order to provide anti-Yugoslavist Croat nationalism with a firm scientific basis, Truhelka used racial anthropology to differentiate between Croats and Serbs. Truhelka claimed that Bosnian Muslims were ethnic Croats, who, according to him, belonged predominantly to the Nordic-Dinaric racial type. On the other hand, the majority of Serbs belonged to the degenerate race of the Vlachs, similar to the Jews and Armenians, although Truhelka 'was cautious to distinguish between the dark-skinned Serbs of Vlach descent and the fair-haired Serbs who, according to him, were pure Slavs'.

Truhelka, like many others, enthusiastically welcomed the creation of the Independent State of Croatia in 1941. By his death a year later, he wrote some racialy-motivated remarks towards Serbs in his book "Memoires of a Pioneer". He claimed that Bosnian Muslims were ethnic Croats who belonged to the racially superior Nordic race. Miljenko Jergović wrote that the book, if this racist remark was put aside, was "one of the most powerful, literally superior, documentary precious Croatian books about Bosnia and Sarajevo at a time when this city turned from the fringes of the Turkish čaršija into one of the metropolises of the Habsburg Empire".

== Works ==
- Starobosanski pismeni spomenici, 1894
- Starobosanski natpisi, 1895
- Slavonski banovci, 1897
- Osvrt na sredovječne kulturne spomenike Bosne, (1900.)
- Djevojački grob, (1901.)
- Državno i sudbeno ustrojstvo Bosne u doba prije Turaka, 1901
- Kraljevski grad Jajce, 1904
- Naši gradovi, 1904
- Arnautske priče, 1905
- Hrvarska Bosna: Mi i "oni tamo" (Croatian Bosnia: We and "They over There"), 1907
- Crtice iz srednjeg vijeka, 1908
- Dubrovačke vijesti o godini 1463., 1910
- Tursko-slavjenski spomenici dubrovačke arhive, 1911
- Gazi Husrefbeg, 1912
- Kulturne prilike Bosne i Hercegovine u doba prehistoričko, 1914
- Historička podloga agrarnog pitanja u Bosni, 1915
- Das Testament des Gost Radin, 1916
- Stari turski agrarni zakonik za Bosnu, 1917
- Konavoski rat 1430.-1433., 1917
- Nekoliko misli o rješenju bosanskog agrarnog pitanja, 1918
- Sojenica kao ishodište pontifikata, 1930
- Starokršćanska arheologija, 1931
- O porijeklu bosanskih muslimana, 1934
- Studije o podrijetlu. Etnološka razmatranja iz Bosne i Hercegovine, 1941
- Uspomene jednog pionira, Croatian Publishing and Bibliographic Institute, 1942
