= Stephen Tomašević of Bosnia =

Stephen Tomašević
- King of Bosnia; Despot of the Kingdom of Serbia
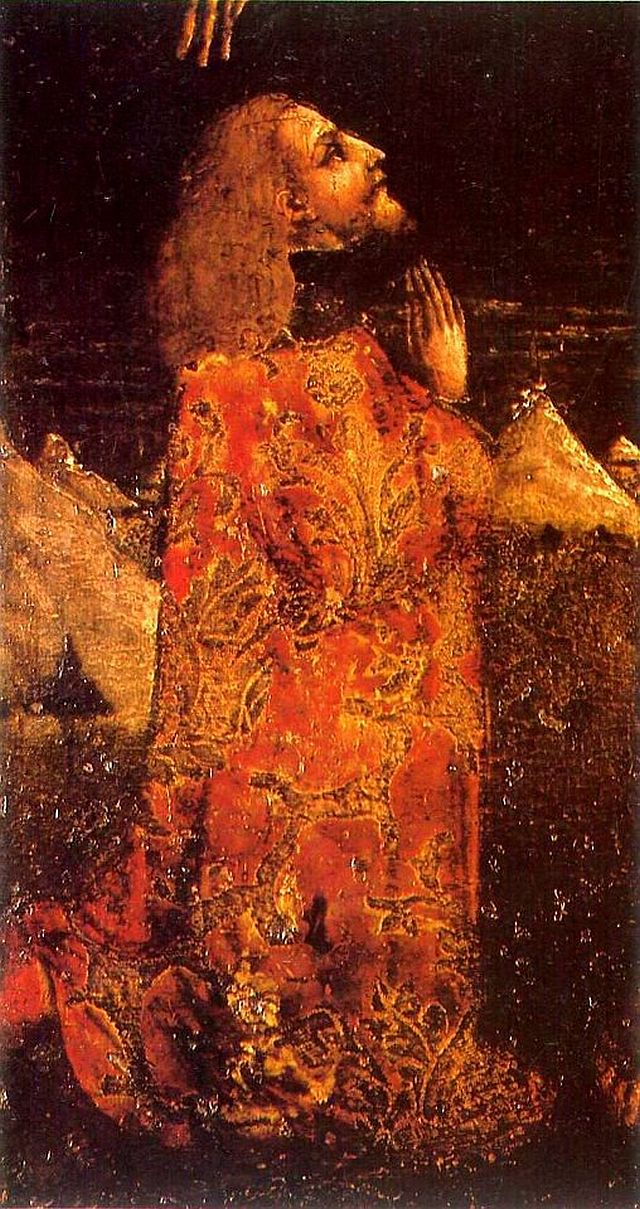
- A detail of the painting of the King kneeling in front of Christ, painted by Lovro Dobričević in c. 1460

King of Bosnia
- Reign: 10 July 1461 – 25 May 1463
- Coronation: 17 November 1461
- Predecessor: Thomas
- Successor: Isa-beg (as first Ottoman Sanjakbey of Bosnia)

Despot of Serbia
- Reign: 1 April 1459 – 20 June 1459
- Predecessor: Stephen
- Born: c. 1438
- Died: 25 May 1463 (aged 24–25); Carevo Polje, Jajce, Bosnia
- Burial: Franciscan monastery of Saint Luke, Jajce (presumed)
- Spouse: Maria of Serbia
- House: Kotromanić
- Father: Thomas, King of Bosnia
- Mother: Vojača
- Religion: Roman Catholic

Stephen Tomašević or Stephen II (Bosnian/Croatian/Serbian: Stjepan/Stefan Tomašević; c. 1438 – 25 May 1463) was the last sovereign from the Bosnian Kotromanić dynasty, reigning as Despot of Serbia briefly in 1459 and as King of Bosnia from 1461 until 1463.

Stephen's father, King Thomas, had great ambitions for him. An attempt to expand into Croatia by marrying Stephen to a wealthy noblewoman failed, and negotiations for a marital alliance with the Sforzas of Milan were abandoned when a more prestigious opportunity presented itself: marriage to the heiress Maria of Serbia. Celebrated in April 1459, it made Stephen the ruler of the remnants of the neighbouring country. The intent was to unite the Kingdom of Bosnia and the Serbian Despotate under Stephen to combat the expanding Ottoman Empire. However, Stephen's Catholicism made him unpopular in Orthodox Serbia. After ruling it for merely two months, he surrendered it to the encroaching Ottoman forces and fled back to his father's court, which earned him the contempt of the Hungarian king Matthias Corvinus and other Christian rulers in Europe.

Stephen succeeded his father on the throne following the latter's death on 10 July 1461 and became the first Bosnian king to receive a crown from the Holy See. The kingdom's existence, however, was increasingly threatened by the Ottomans. King Stephen had the unanimous support of his noblemen in resistance to the Ottomans, but not of the common people. He maintained an active correspondence with Pope Pius II, who forgave him for the loss of Serbia and worked with him to preserve Bosnia for Christendom. The Hungarian king was placated, but all Western monarchs contacted by Stephen refused to assist him. Confident that at least Matthias would come to his aid, Stephen refused to deliver the customary tribute to the Ottoman sultan Mehmed the Conqueror, which provoked an invasion. In May 1463, Mehmed marched into Bosnia, meeting little effective resistance, and captured Stephen, who was then beheaded. The execution marks the fall of the Kingdom of Bosnia to the Ottoman Empire.

== Family ==
Born in 1438, Stephen hailed from the House of Kotromanić as one of the two known sons of the Bosnian prince Thomas by a commoner named Vojača. The other son died as an adolescent. Stephen's father was an adulterine son of King Ostoja and a younger brother of Radivoj, who contested the rule of their cousin King Tvrtko II. Thomas was politically inactive and did not take part in the struggle between his brother and cousin, enabling his family to lead a quiet life in a period when the Ottomans tried to weaken the Kingdom of Bosnia by encouraging internal divisions. This all changed when the ailing and childless King Tvrtko II decreed that Thomas should succeed him. The King died shortly after, in November 1443, and Stephen's father ascended the throne.

King Thomas, raised as a member of the Bosnian Church, converted to Roman Catholicism in c. 1445; Stephen Tomašević later stated that he had been baptized into the Roman Catholic Church as a child, and that he had been taught Latin letters. At about that time, likely in order to allow for a peaceful solution to his protracted war with the magnate Stjepan Vukčić Kosača, King Thomas requested from Pope Eugene IV an annulment of his union with Stephen's mother. Open warfare ended in 1446 with the marriage of Stephen's father to Kosača's daughter Catherine, by whom Stephen had a half-brother named Sigismund and a half-sister named Catherine.

== Marriage ==
In the 1450s, King Thomas vigorously searched for suitable spouses for the children from his first union. Stephen's two sisters were married off in 1451, and in 1453 Stephen too entered his father's considerations. Wishing to gain control over the allodial land of Petar Talovac, who had governed Croatia proper as ban on behalf of the Hungarian king, Thomas attempted to have Stephen marry Talovac's widow, Hedwig Garai. Kosača too hastened to marry the wealthy widow, leading to an armed conflict, but neither prevailed due to an intervention by the Republic of Venice on behalf of Talovac's heirs.

The earliest source mentioning Stephen by name dates from 30 April 1455, when Pope Callixtus III put the King of Bosnia and his son under his protection. King Thomas's ambitions for Stephen grew as he strived to establish closer relations with the Western world. In 1456, he asked the Pope to procure a bride for his son, specifying that she should be a princess from a royal house. Negotiations soon commenced about Stephen's marriage to an illegitimate daughter of Francesco I Sforza, Duke of Milan, but Stephen's father had greater expectations.

When Lazar Branković, Despot of Serbia, died in 1458, an interregnum ensued. Having left three daughters and no sons, he had no clear heir, so power was shared between his blinded brother Stephen and widow Helen Palaiologina. King Thomas took advantage of their weakness to recapture Eastern Bosnian towns he had lost to Serbia in 1445. Shortly afterwards, he entered peace negotiations with Lazar's widow, Helen Palaiologina. Abandoning the prospect of his son's marriage to a daughter of the Duke of Milan, Thomas came to an agreement with Helen: Stephen was to marry the eldest of her three daughters by Lazar, the c. 11-year-old Helen. The match was prestigious for Stephen not only because of the bride's descent from the Byzantine imperial family, but also because it brought the government of Serbia to the groom.

The Hungarian king Matthias Corvinus agreed to Stephen's engagement with Helen – it was in his interest to create a strong buffer zone between his realm and the Ottoman Empire by uniting the Kingdom of Bosnia and the Despotate of Serbia, which he considered Hungary's vassal states, under Stephen Tomašević. The Diet of Hungary confirmed Stephen Tomašević's right to Serbia in January 1459.

== Despotism ==
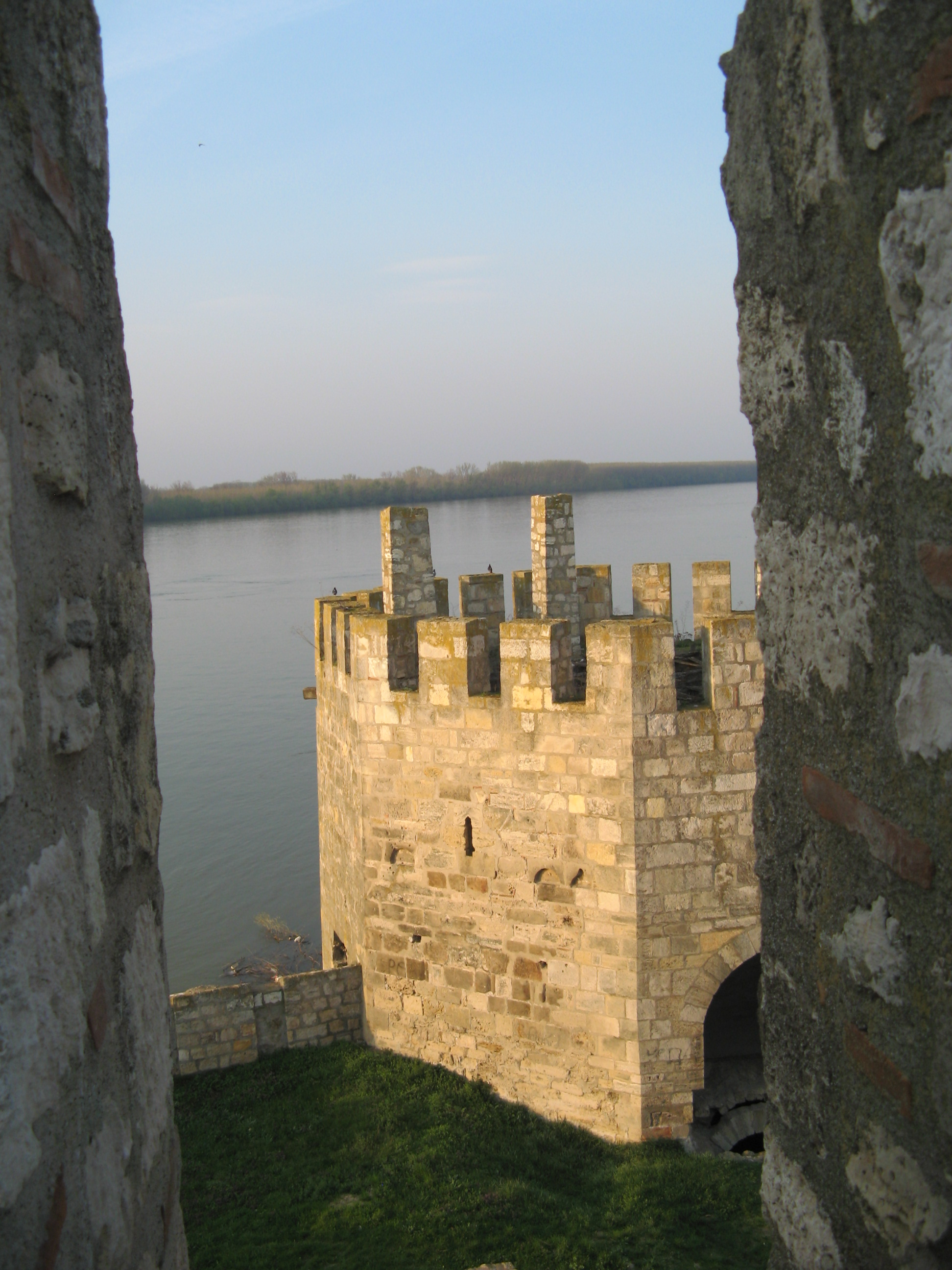
The acquisition of the Smederevo Fortress in 1459 was an important but short-lived success.

Stephen, accompanied by his uncle Radivoj, duly set out for Serbia but narrowly escaped imprisonment during an Ottoman raid on the Bosnian royal residence of Bobovac. He arrived in Smederevo, capital of the Eastern Orthodox despotate, during the Holy Week, and ascended the Serbian throne on 21 March 1459. Michael Szilágyi, regent for the underage King Matthias, arrived at the head of an army to ensure that command over the town's fortress would be assumed by Stephen without any difficulties.

Stephen's marriage to Helen took place on 1 April 1459, the first Sunday following Easter. Following the presumably Catholic ceremony, the bride was known as Maria. He assumed the title of despot, despite the fact that the title was neither hereditary nor tied to a specific territory, but a grant from the Byzantine emperor. It is possible that his mother-in-law, a member of Byzantium's last imperial family, believed that she had the right to grant the title in the absence of an emperor. Within a week of the wedding, Stephen exiled his wife's uncle from Serbia. King Thomas boasted to the Duke of Milan that his son had been made despot "with the agreement and will of all the Rascians", but Stephen's regime was not particularly popular; chroniclers writing about his treatment of his wife's uncle cursed him as a schismatic.

It was clear from the outset that Stephen's reign in Serbia would be short-lived. The Ottoman sultan Mehmed the Conqueror considered Stephen's enthronement an unwarranted violation of his own rights, for the Ottomans too considered Serbia their vassal state. Mehmed promptly launched an attack on Smederevo in June, and there was no serious consideration of trying to defend it. King Thomas rushed to his son's aid, trying to divert the Turks by laying siege to their fortress of Hodidjed, in the middle of Bosnia. Aware that Smederevo could not withstand Mehmed's attack, Stephen surrendered the fortress on 20 June 1459. The Ottoman proceeded to annex the rest of the Serbian state to their empire within a year.

Following the fall of the town which Pope Pius II lamentably termed "the gateway to Rascia", Stephen fled to Bosnia with his family and in-laws, seeking refuge at the court of his father. The King of Hungary accused Stephen and his family of selling Smederevo Fortress to the Ottomans "for a great weight of gold", and the Pope at first believed him. Pius's own investigation appears to have come to the conclusion that Stephen did not sell the fortress, as the Pope did not repeat the claim. Ottoman, Bosnian and Serbian sources say nothing about the supposed betrayal, so the allegation is unlikely to be based on fact. The Serbian-born janissary Konstantin Mihailović and the Byzantine Greek scholar Laonikos Chalkokondyles maintained Stephen's innocence and pointed out to the strength of the Ottoman army. Both state that the Serbs within Smederevo were so unhappy with Bosnian rule and convinced that the Ottomans would prevail (and grant them more religious tolerance than the Hungarians) that they went out to meet Mehmed and presented him with keys to the city.

== Kingship ==
=== Accession and coronation ===
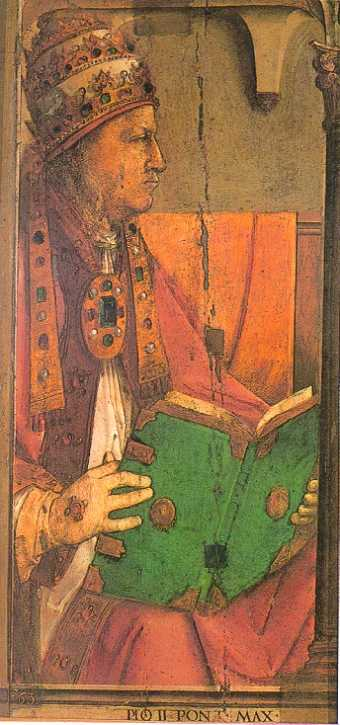
Pope Pius II's memoirs provide a major insight into Stephen Tomašević's reign.

King Thomas died on 10 July 1461. According to later accounts, Thomas's death was plotted by Stephen and Radivoj, and even Matthias and Mehmed were implicated. Historians dismiss these allegations, however, pointing out that the King had been ill since June. Stephen ascended the throne without difficulty. He ensured that his uncle would not contest the succession by generously endowing him with land. The new monarch assumed the pompous title inherited from Tvrtko I, the first Bosnian king, styling himself as, "by the Grace of God, King of Serbia, Bosnia, the Maritime Lands, Zachlumia, Dalmatia, Croatia, and the Western lands" – regardless of the fact that Serbia had by then become an Ottoman pashaluk, that Croatia had been lost to Hungary in the 1390s, and that he had to beg the government of the Republic of Venice to allow him to take refuge in Dalmatia in case of an Ottoman attack.

Immediately upon his accession, Stephen set out to resolve all disagreements within the royal family in order to strengthen his own position. His relations with his stepmother, the 37-year-old Queen Catherine, had been strained during his father's lifetime, but he now guaranteed that she would retain her title and privileges. Her father, Stjepan Vukčić Kosača, wrote to Venetian officials that the King had "taken her as his mother", Vojača having already died by the time he ascended the throne. Kosača was the kingdom's most powerful nobleman, and had been engaged in a never-ending conflict with Stephen's father. Stephen Tomašević took the Venetians' advice to make peace with his stepgrandfather, thus finally ensuring the nobility's absolute support of their king. He then focused on improving Bosnia's economy, which became stronger than ever during his reign, and ensuring that the state would collect more profit from the flourishing metalworking trade.

Problems rose soon already in the summer of 1461, when Pavao Špirančić, who governed Croatia as ban on behalf of the Hungarian king and frequently clashed with King Thomas, seized a border town. By late summer, Stephen and Kosača were preparing to strike him jointly and divide his territory between themselves. Venice objected, fearing that the fortresses Klis and Ostrovica, paramount to the defense of Dalmatia, might fall to the Ottomans if first taken over by the Bosnians.

King Stephen wasted no time to solidify his relations with the Holy See. He sent a desperate plea to Pope Pius, asking him to send bishops, crusading weapons, and a coronation crown, as well as to be recommended to Matthias Corvinus. Stephen hoped that, with the Pope's urging, the Hungarian king would agree to provide him with military aid. On 17 November 1461, the feast of Saint Gregory Thaumaturgus, who had been proclaimed "Defender of Bosnia" at royal request, the papal legate and newly appointed bishop Nicholas of Modruš crowned Stephen in the Church of Saint Mary in Jajce. It was the last coronation performed in Bosnia, as well as the only one performed with a crown sent from Rome. It exemplified how, with the religious persecution established by Thomas and with Stephen's active correspondence with the papacy, the Kingdom of Bosnia acquired the character of a true Catholic state only at its very end.

The belated attempt at sanctification of the Bosnian monarchy gravely offended the Hungarian king Matthias, who saw the Pope's involvement in the coronation as an infringement of the rights of Hungarian kings. Matthias went so far as to request that the Pope withdraw his support of Stephen. Pope Pius and Bishop John Vitéz mediated in the dispute between the kings of Bosnia and Hungary, but the negotiations did not proceed easily. The relations were finally repaired in the spring of 1462. Matthias was driven by the need to ransom the Crown of St Stephen from Emperor Frederick III, and Stephen was obliged to contribute. In return for the Hungarian king's good graces, Stephen was also required to cede certain towns, swear fealty and to refuse to pay tribute to the Ottomans.

=== Ottoman invasion ===
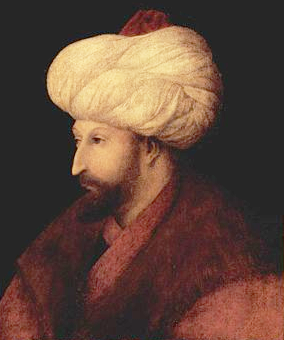
Portrait of Mehmed by Gentile Bellini, whose father painted the only known portrait of Stephen

By the spring of 1462, it was known that Mehmed had decided to conquer Bosnia. Stephen and Kosača desperately sought help from Christian rulers. The King maintained contact with the Pope, who had his legates stay permanently at the Bosnian royal court and who strived to concentrate as many soldiers and as much weapons as possible in the threatened kingdom. The authorities of the neighbouring Republic of Ragusa were enlisted to secure the support of the Albanian ruler Skanderbeg, who was subsequently allowed by the Venetians to pass with his army through Venetian Albania on their way to Bosnia. Venice itself promised no assistance, suggesting instead that Stephen and Kosača should trust in their own forces. Others, such as King Ferdinand I of Naples, cited domestic issues and offered nothing more than moral support.

While doing everything possible to secure foreign aid, King Stephen found that there was little will to resist within the country. He complained to Pope Pius that the local population leaned towards the Ottomans, which may have been due to increased exploitation and incessant warfare (as opposed to a stable Ottoman regime). The previously tacit discontent of forcefully converted elders of the Bosnian Church became prominent. According to a contemporary, Stephen generously bestowed gifts and honors in order to inspire loyalty, and awarded fortified towns to untrustworthy people, even including former "heretics". The greatest blow to the defense efforts, however, was the old conflict between Kosača and his son Vladislav Hercegović, which was resumed in the spring of 1462. Vladislav personally sought help from Mehmed later that year, and the Ottoman ruler eagerly accepted.

Encouraged by Matthias's commitment to help and possibly by the Bishop of Modruš, Stephen Tomašević made an imprudent and fatal decision in June 1462. Pope Pius wrote in his diary that, "relying on one knows what hope", the King "refused the tributes which his ancestors had long been used to pay the Ottomans and had stormed the town which the enemy had built at the confluence of Sava and Bosna to put fear into the Hungarians and Slavs." According to Chalkokondyles, Stephen invited the Ottoman ambassador to his treasure house and showed him the money set aside as tribute, but informed him that he would rather use it to fight off an Ottoman attack or to live off it in exile. Mehmed the Conqueror was enraged by Stephen's insubordinance and audacity. The Pope recounts how, hearing of the Sultan's vow to conquer his kingdom and destroy him, Stephen summoned the Bishop of Modruš and blamed him for infuriating the Sultan. He commanded Nicholas to go to Hungary and seek immediate action against the Ottomans, but no help ever arrived to Bosnia from Christendom. Matthias, Skenderbeg and the Ragusans all failed to carry out their promises.

"I am the first to expect the storm. [...] My father predicted to your predecessor, Nicholas V, and the Venetians the fall of Constantinople. He was not believed. [...] Now I prophesy about myself. If you trust and aid me I shall be saved; if not, I shall perish and many will be ruined with me."
Excerpts from King Stephen's letter to Pope Pius

In the spring of 1463, Mehmed gathered an army of 150,000 men in Adrianople and prepared to march towards Bosnia. In his despair, Stephen Tomašević turned to the Sultan himself and tried at the last moment to procure a 15-year-long truce with him. Konstantinović claimed that he was present when the Ottomans duped the Bosnian envoys into thinking that the King's request for truce was granted, and that he tried to warn them about the deceit. Mehmed's army set out right after the envoys. Fortresses fell rapidly, and King Stephen fled with his family and possessions from Bobovac to Jajce. The Ottoman army under the leadership of Mahmud Pasha Angelović laid siege to Bobovac on 19 May 1463, with the Sultan joining them the following day. Angelović was tasked with capturing the King. Believing that Bobovac could withstand the siege for two years, Stephen planned to assemble an army in Jajce, still counting on foreign aid. He sent his wife with their possessions to Dalmatia, while his stepmother took the rest to Ragusa.

=== Capture and death ===
Contrary to Stephen Tomašević's expectations, Bobovac fell within days. The King had already realized that he had no choice but to take refuge in the neighbouring Croatia or Dalmatia. Angelović tirelessly pursued him, and caught up with him in Ključ. The Ottoman army was reportedly about to pass the city's fortress, not suspecting that the King was hiding within its walls, when a local man revealed his whereabouts in return for money. A four-day-long siege of the fortress ensued. Eager to capture him, Angelović had his messengers solemnly promise the King that he would be done no harm if he surrendered, and sent him a document guaranteeing him freedom. With food supplies and ammunition running short, Stephen decided to surrender himself and his garrison to Angelović. Angelović, in turn, brought him, his uncle Radivoj and 13-year-old cousin Tvrtko before Mehmed in Jajce.

Stephen sought to ingratiate himself with Mehmed by sending out orders to commanders and castellans to surrender, enabling his captor to take command of more than 70 towns in one week. Mehmed, however, had no intention of sparing Stephen's life and summoned him on 25 May 1463. Stephen fearfully brought Angelović's document along, but Mehmed's Persian-born mullah, Ali al-Bistami, issued a fatwah declaring that the Sultan was not bound to keep the promise made by his servant without his knowledge. As if to demonstrate the validity of his fatwah, the elderly mullah took out his sword and beheaded Stephen in front of Mehmed. The chronicler Benedetto Dei, who claimed to have been part of the Sultan's retinue, recorded that Mehmed himself decapitated Stephen. According to later accounts, Mehmed had Stephen flayed or used as a shooting target. The execution of the King, his uncle, cousin and two noblemen took place in a field next to Jajce, which has since been known as Carevo Polje ("the Emperor's Field").

== Assessment and legacy ==
Stephen Tomašević was buried on a hill near Jajce. Europe was stunned to see the Bosnian state fall almost completely within weeks of his death. The country's quick submission is said to be the consequence of a poor cooperation between Stephen and his noblemen, but it is perhaps most accurate to attribute it to the people's low morale and general belief that the conquest was inevitable. Additionally, the religiously diverse Bosnians were aware, much like the neighbouring Serbians, that the country would be overrun by Hungary if not by the Ottomans, and that they would enjoy far less freedom of religion and far higher taxes in that case. Therefore, resistance was not as strong as it could have been. Pope Pius's claim that adherents of the Bosnian Church betrayed the kingdom is groundless.

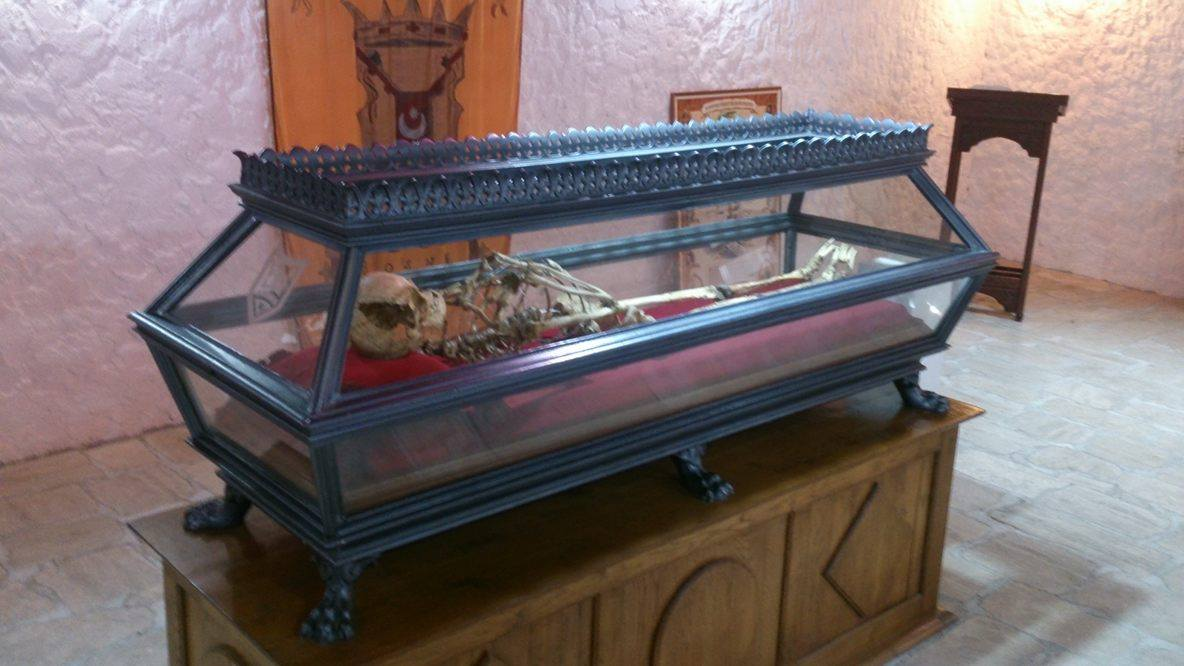
Putative remains of King Stephen

Stephen Tomašević's half-siblings were taken to Constantinople and converted to Islam. Queen Catherine, his stepmother, left for the Papal States and unsuccessfully campaigned for the restoration of the kingdom; Bosnia only ceased to be part of the Ottoman Empire in 1908, 445 years after Stephen's death. His widow, Queen Maria, spent the rest of her life in the Empire.

In 1888, the Croatian archeologist Ćiro Truhelka excavated bones in a settlement close to Jajce known as Kraljev Grob (meaning King's Tomb) and found the skeleton of a decapitated adult male. The head was placed on the chest, with two coins in the mouth. Though by no means certain, it was assumed that the skeleton belonged to Stephen Tomašević. Despite objection from the friar Antun Knežević, who argued for leaving the bones where they had laid for centuries and constructing a small church at the site, the skeleton was placed in a glass coffin in the right aisle of the Franciscan monastery in Jajce.

== Family tree ==
Ostoja
Radivoj | Vojača | Thomas
Maria | Stephen | Sigismund

Kosača
Catherine | Vladislav
Catherine

== In popular culture ==
In the Turkish historical fiction TV series Mehmed: Fetihler Sultanı, King Stephen Tomašević is portrayed by German-Turkish actor Yılmaz Bayraktar.

== Bibliography ==
- Bury, John Bagnell; Tanner, Joseph Robson; Previté-Orton, Charles William; Brooke, Zachary Nugent, eds. (1923), The Cambridge Medieval History, vol. 4, Cambridge University Press
- Ćirković, Sima (1964). Историја средњовековне босанске државе (in Serbo-Croatian). Srpska književna zadruga.
- Ćošković, Pejo (2009), Kotromanići (in Serbo-Croatian), Miroslav Krleža Institute of Lexicography
- Fine, John Van Antwerp Jr. (1994) [1987]. The Late Medieval Balkans: A Critical Survey from the Late Twelfth Century to the Ottoman Conquest. Ann Arbor, Michigan: University of Michigan Press. ISBN 0472082604.
- Fine, John Van Antwerp Jr. (2007). The Bosnian Church: Its Place in State and Society from the Thirteenth to the Fifteenth Century. Saqi. ISBN 978-0-86356-503-8.
- Mandić, Dominik (1978), Sabrana djela Dr. O. Dominika Mandića: Bosna i Hercegovina: povjesno kritička istraživanja, Zajednica izdanja ranjeni labud
- Miller, William (1923), The Cambridge Medieval History, Volume 4, Cambridge University Press
- Ljubez, Bruno (2009), Jajce Grad: prilog povijesti posljednje bosanske prijestolnice (in Serbo-Croatian), HKD Napredak
- Miller, Timothy S.; Nesbitt, John W., eds. (1995), Peace and war in Byzantium: essays in honor of George T. Dennis, S.J, Catholic University of America Press, ISBN 081320805X
- Babinger, Franz (1992). Mehmed the Conqueror and His Time. USA: Princeton University Press. ISBN 0-691-01078-1.
- Mühle, Eduard [in German] (2023). Slavs in the Middle Ages Between Idea and Reality. Brill Publishers. ISBN 978-9-00453-674-6.

Regnal titles
| Preceded by Thomas | King of Bosnia; 1461–1463 | Ottoman conquest |
| Preceded by Stephen | Despot of Serbia; 1459 | Ottoman conquest |
