= Carevo Polje (Bosnia and Herzegovina) =

- Village
- Location within Bosnia and Herzegovina
- Coordinates: 44.3547°N 17.2700°E
- Country: Bosnia and Herzegovina
- Entity: Federation of Bosnia and Herzegovina
- Canton: Central Bosnia
- Municipality: Jajce

Area
  - Total: 1.74 sq mi (4.51 km^{2})

Population (2013)
  - Total: 1,189
  - Density: 683/sq mi (264/km^{2})
- Time zone: UTC+1 (CET)
  - Summer (DST): UTC+2 (CEST)

Carevo Polje is a village in the municipality of Jajce, Bosnia and Herzegovina. It is the place where, in 1463, Sultan Mehmed the Conqueror ordered the execution of the last King of Bosnia, Stephen Tomašević.

== Historical significance ==
In English the name means The Emperor's Field, and is attributed to the Mehmed the Conqueror and the events surrounding Ottoman invasion and fall of Bosnian Kingdom, culminating in Bosnian king Stjepan Tomašević beheading at the location.

== Demographics ==
According to the 2013 census, its population was 1,189.

Ethnicity in 2013
Ethnicity	Number	Percentage
Croats	1,009	84.9%
Bosniaks	158	13.3%
Serbs	3	0.3%
other/undeclared	19	1.6%
Total	1,189	100%
