= Ali al-Bistami =

'Ala' al-Dln 'All al-Bistami (1403-1470/71), better known as Ali al-Bistami or Musannifek ("Little Author"), was a Persian Hanafi Maturidi scholar, prolific author, mullah and sheikh who served the Ottoman Empire.

Musannifek traced his descent back to the caliph Umar. He was educated in Herat, capital of the Timurid Empire. In the 1440s, he moved to Karamanid-ruled Anatolia and began teaching in Konya. At the invitation of Mahmud Pasha Angelović, Grand Vizier of the Ottoman Empire, Musannifek moved to Constantinople, where he received 80 akçe per day. When the eccentric scholar Hasan Çelebi el-Fenari criticized one of al-Bistami's books at Mahmud Pasha's house, he was warned that al-Bistami was just next to him, which caused embarrassment to Çelebi; Mahmud Pasha comforted him by noting that al-Bistami was deaf.

Al-Bistami followed the Ottoman ruler Mehmed the Conqueror on his campaigns. Upon Mehmed's conquest of the Genoese-held island of Lesbos in 1462, al-Bistami was put in charge of Mytilene, the island's capital. Despite being promised safety, 300 Genoese prisoners were sawn in half. When Mehmed marched towards the Kingdom of Bosnia the following year, al-Bistami was again among his retinue. Bosnia was subdued in May, and the captured King Stephen Tomašević was promised safety by Mahmud Pasha. The Sultan had no intention of keeping the promise, however, and summoned al-Bistami. Al-Bistami delivered a fatwah declaring Mahmud Pasha's promise non-binding, drew his sword and beheaded the last King of Bosnia.

== Bibliography ==
- Babinger, Franz (1992). Mehmed the Conqueror and His Time. USA: Princeton University Press. ISBN 0-691-01078-1.
- Atçıl, Abdurrahman (2016). Scholars and Sultans in the Early Modern Ottoman Empire. Cambridge University Press. ISBN 978-1107177161.
- Cici, Recep (2001). Osmanlı dönemi İslâm hukuku çalışmaları: kuruluştan Fatih devrinin sonuna kadar (in Turkish). Arasta Yayınları. ISBN 9758484079.
