= Saint Mary's Church, Jajce =

Church ruins in Bosnia

Coordinates: 44.3394°N 17.2690°E

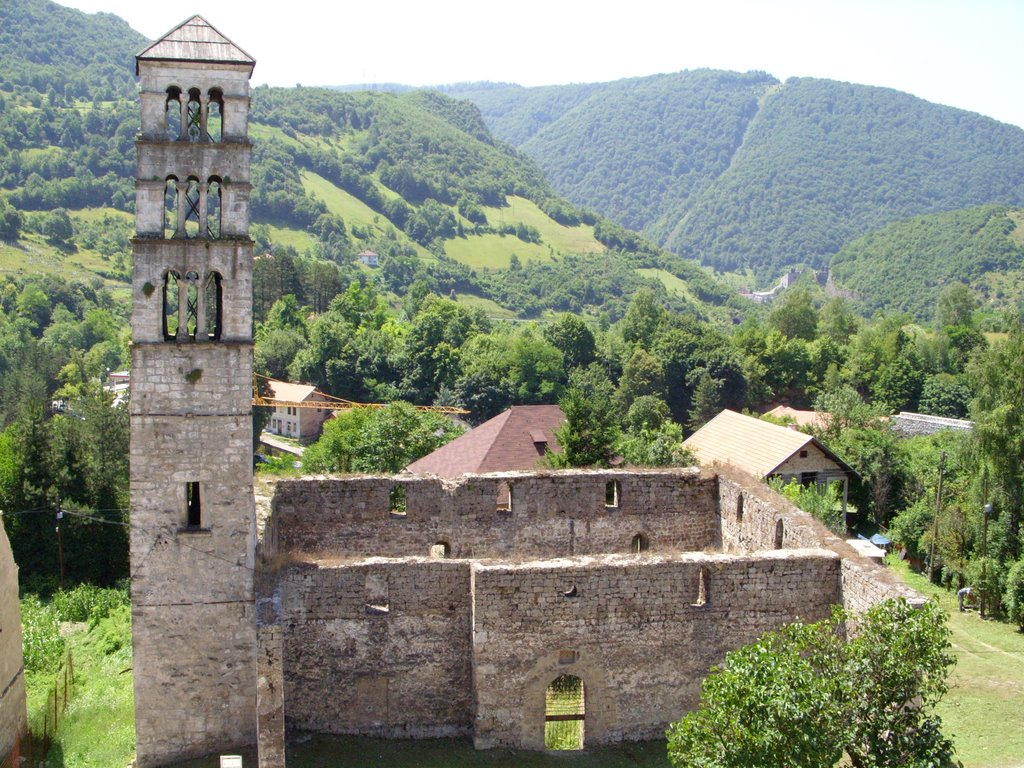
The remnants of Saint Mary's Church and Saint Luke's Bell Tower photographed in 2008

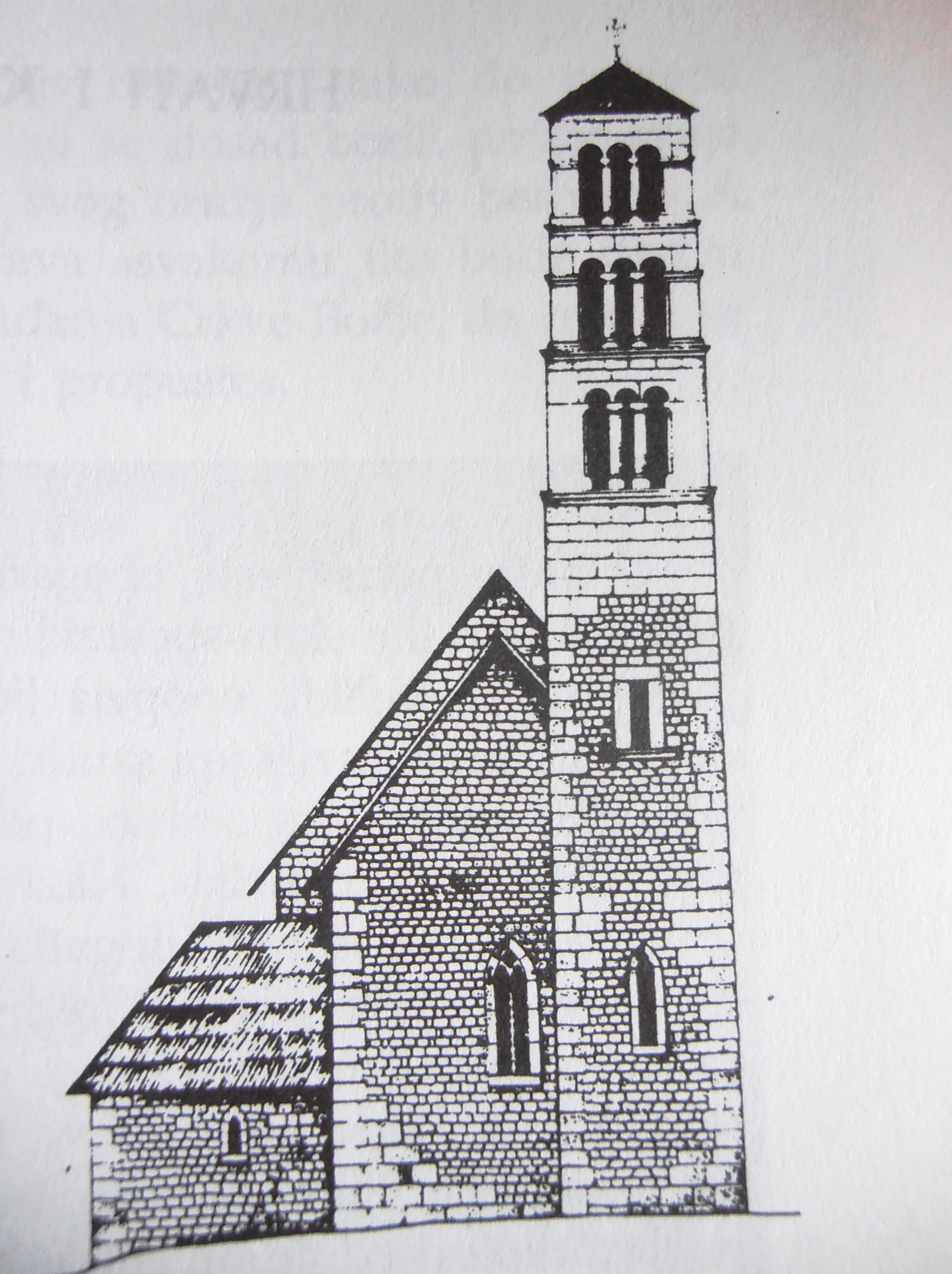
A reconstruction drawing

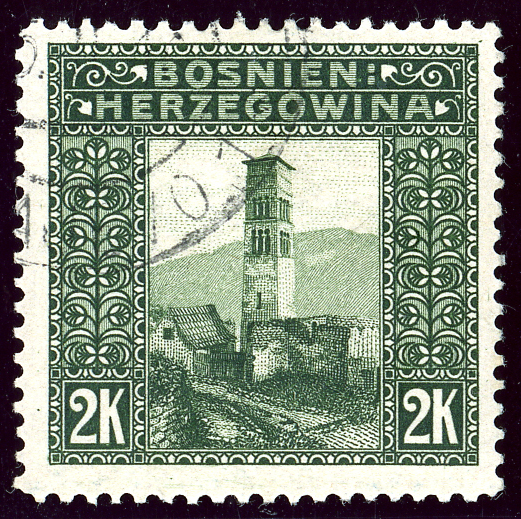
A 1906 stamp featuring Saint Mary's Church and Saint Luke's Bell Tower

Saint Mary's Church (Serbo-Croatian: Crkva svete Marije), later Sultan Suleiman's Mosque (Sultan-Sulejmanova džamija/ Султан-Сулејманова џамија) or Fethija (Фетхија, from the Turkish word fethetti, meaning "conquered"), was a place of worship in Jajce, Bosnia and Herzegovina. Along with the remnants of the adjoining Saint Luke's Bell Tower (Zvonik svetog Luke/Звоник светог Луке), it is a national monument of Bosnia and Herzegovina. The buildings are located in the historic centre of the city of Jajce, at the foot of the citadel.

== Origin and description ==
The building has undergone a series of redesigns, which makes difficult establishing its age and the original appearance with certainty. It is assumed that the church was first built as a simple Romanesque-style basilica in the 12th century. It had deteriorated significantly by the end of the 14th century, when it was restored and dedicated to the Blessed Virgin Mary. It is not clear who commissioned the restoration of the building; circumstantial evidence points to either the Franciscans who had settled in the area or, somewhat less likely, to Hrvoje Vukčić Hrvatinić, the Kingdom of Bosnia's leading magnate and founder of the city of Jajce.

The church was re-adapted to the more popular Gothic style in the early 15th century, after the kings of Bosnia acquired Jajce in connection to King Ostoja's marriage to Hrvoje's widow, Jelena Nelipić. The surviving frescos, dating from the first half of the 15th century, are typical of the Late Gothic art; the most significant composition depicted the Last Judgment, a common theme in contemporary Europe.

== Royal church ==
Following his loss of Serbia to the Ottomans in 1459, King Thomas's son, Stephen, returned to Bosnia with his wife Maria, and her family. Maria brought along the relics of Luke the Evangelist, and a bell tower, bearing the saint's name, was erected next to the church. On 17 November 1461, the church served as the place of coronation of King Stephen; it was the last coronation in Bosnia. The Ottoman conquest of Bosnia took place two years later, commencing the centuries-long Ottoman rule over Bosnia. King Stephen was executed in the process, while Queen Maria took the relics and sold them to the Republic of Venice.

== Mosque ==
In 1528, Saint Mary's Church was converted into a mosque and named after the Ottoman sultan Suleiman the Magnificent. The building burned on several occasions. The most devastating fire occurred in 1658. The last fire, in 1832, left behind nothing but walls, and the building has not been used since.
