= Minnetoğlu Mehmed Bey =

Ottoman governor of Bosnia by c. 1464

- Military career
- Allegiance: Ottoman Empire
- Service years: 15th century
- Rank: sanjak-bey (provincial governor)

Minnetoğlu Mehmed Bey (Serbo-Croatian: Mehmed-beg Minetović; fl. 1463–64) was an Ottoman Bosnian general and the first governor of the Sanjak of Bosnia, serving Sultan Mehmed II. He was of Turkish origin.

Minnetoğlu participated in the Bosnian campaign led by Sultan Mehmed in 1463–64 (1460–61 according to chronicler Tursun Beg). According to some Bosnian sources he was at that time the governor of the Sanjak of Smederevo, or "lord of the Serbian land", however, other sources treat general Ali Bey Mihaloğlu as the sanjak-bey of Smederevo, appointed in 1462–63. When the sultan left the siege of Jajce to march against retreating Hungarians, Minnetoğlu was placed in charge of the siege. After the second siege in 1463 or 1464, the sultan appointed Minnetoğlu as the first sanjak-bey (provincial governor) of the Sanjak of Bosnia, at first seated at Jajce (later Sarajevo). Minnetoğlu sent 500 cavalry to the Ottoman camp at Zvornik, fighting the besieging Hungarians. Isa-Beg Ishaković succeeded him as Bosnian governor.

Sultan Mehmed settled Turks from Amasya into Rumelia under the leadership of Minnetoğlu.

== Endowments ==
- A mosque near where the Latin Bridge in Sarajevo was later built.
- Konuş Hisarı, a bedestan and imaret at Tatar-Pazarcığı from where the town of Pazardzhik in Bulgaria evolved.

== Sources ==
- Konstantin Mihailović (1975). Memoirs of a Janissary. Published under the auspices of the Joint Committee on Eastern Europe, American Council of Learned Societies, by the Department of Slavic Languages and Literatures, University of Michigan.
- Tursun Beg (1978). The History of Mehmed the Conqueror. Bibliotheca Islamica. ISBN 978-0-88297-018-9.
- Šabanović, Hazim (1959). Bosanski pašaluk: postanak i upravna podjela. Oslobodenje.

New title	Sanjak-bey of Bosnia ca. 1464–?	Succeeded by Isa-Beg Ishaković
