= Miloradović noble family =

Bosnian Vlach katun clan and noble family

Miloradović-Hrabren Hrabren
- Vlachs clan and noble family
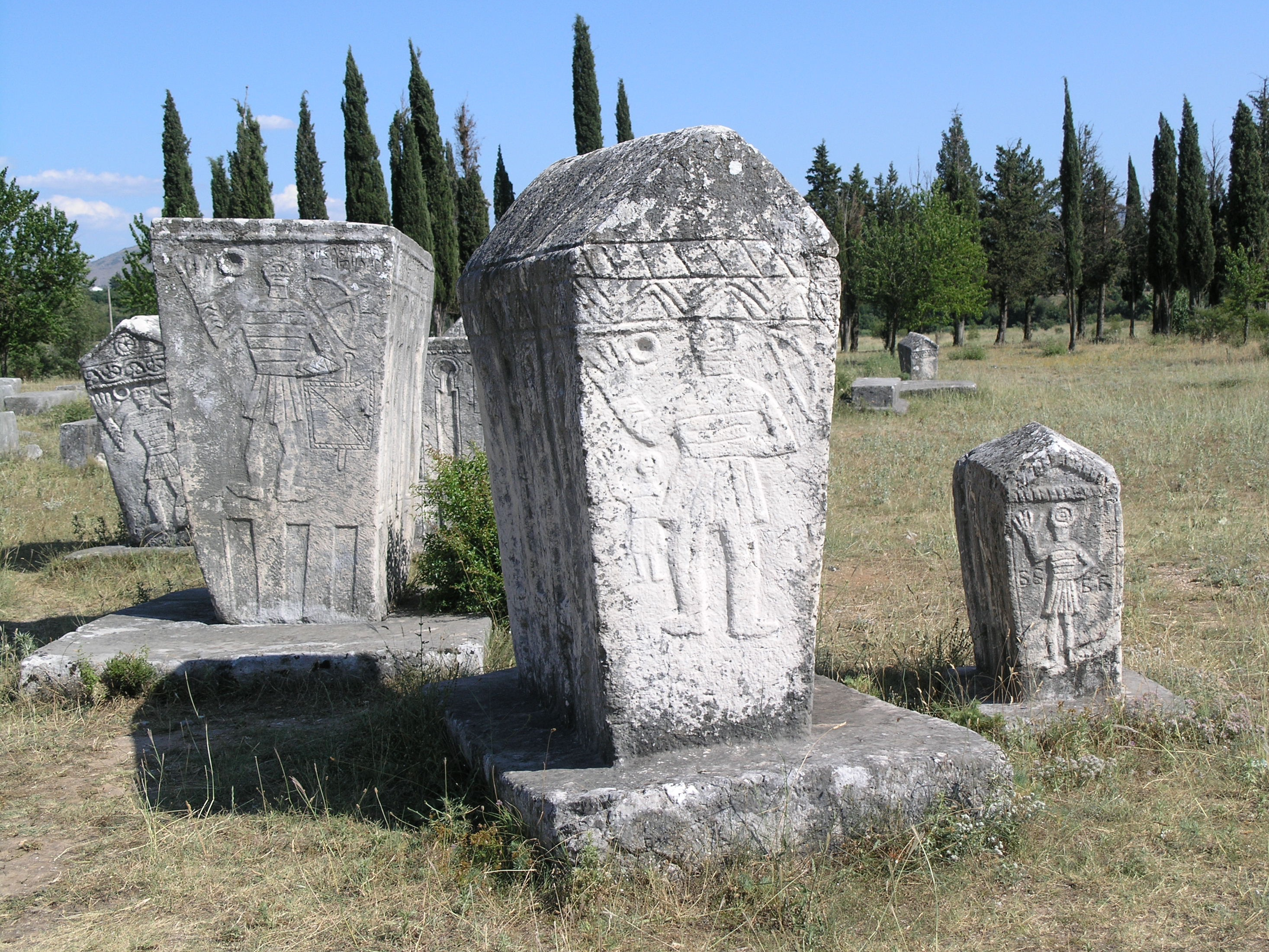
- Radimlja necropolis, resting place for several members of the family, is National Monuments of Bosnia and Herzegovina and inscribed UNESCO heritage site.
- Parent house: Hrabren
- Country: Bosnia and Herzegovina
- Origin: Donji Vlasi; Dubrave, Vidovo Polje (region surrounding Stolac)
- Founded: mid-15th century
- Founder: Milorad
- Titles: vojvoda (duke), knyaz
- Members: duke Stipan Miloradović duke Petar, son of duke Stipan; Ivan Hrabren; Vukić, son of duke Stjepan and brother of duke Petar; Radoje, son of duke Stjepan and brother of duke Petar; Radosav Hrabren, son of duke Petar spahi Milislav Hrabren duke Radoje Vukovič, nephew of duke Petar
- Connected families: Vukovič
- Estates: manors in Crnići, Dubrave, and Opijači property in Žitomislić, Dračevo and Svitava, Gabela, by the river Neretva including Obrljin hill above Zijemlje (vicinity of Mostar)
- Cadet branches: Miloradović, Stjepanović, Opijač, Ljoljić, Kuzman

The Miloradović (Serbian Cyrillic: Милорадовић) or later Stjepanović (Стјепановић), whose paternal parent house was Hrabren (Храбрен), were an Eastern Orthodox Bosnian Vlach noble family and a katun clan from Hum, and later Sanjak of Herzegovina, parts of present-day Bosnia and Herzegovina, and whose some later branches embraced the Bosnian Serb ethnic identity, while others converted to Islam and became Bosnian Muslims (modern days' Bosniaks). The members of the family served the Kingdom of Bosnia, the Republic of Ragusa, and the Ottoman Empire. One branch of the Miloradović's established themselves as military leaders of Russian Empire and were adopted into the Russian nobility. The family left behind several cultural-historical monuments important to Bosnian and Herzegovinian heritage, protected as such by the KONS state agency and the UNESCO.

== Family background ==
It is deduced from written monuments that the Miloradović's progenitor was Milorad Hrabren, of Hrabren klan from Donji Vlasi in Hum zemlja, in present-day Bosnia and Herzegovina, at the time part of Bosnian Kingdom. The family patronymic changed over time, and later surname Stjepanović also fared prominently. Ethnically they were Bosnian Vlachs and a katun clan, who distinguished themselves in service of local Slavic lords and became noble family, with members gaining status of vojvodas and knyazs. They flourished later under Ottomans in Sanjak of Herzegovina as prominent Bosnian Ottoman nobility. An Eastern Orthodox by religion, some later branches embraced Bosnian Serb ethnic identity, while other converted to Islam and became Bosnian Muslims (today Bosniaks). The members of the family served the Bosnian Kingdom, Republic of Ragusa, Ottoman Empire. One branch of Miloradovićs established themselves as military leaders of Russian Empire, and were adopted into Russian nobility.

== Middle Ages ==
The progenitor of Hrabren-Miloradović family was Milorad Hrabren, chieftain of Vlachs from Donji Vlasi. Milorad lived in the second half of the 14th century. In 1416, his son, Stipan (Stjepan), is mentioned in appeal by Republic of Ragusa as a nobleman who fought in the Lower Neretva near Slivno along Petar Pavlović against Sandalj Hranić and his Ottoman allies, in a quarrel between two most powerful Bosnian magnate families at the time, the Pavlović's and the Hranić's. Stjepan Miloradović had three sons: Petar Stjepanović, first mentioned in 1473 and the last time in 1486; Radoja Stjepanović, who died between 1475 and 1477, and Vukić Stjepanović, who was mentioned for the last time in 1496. They had land possessions between Stolac and Mostar.

Radimlja, near Stolac, was in their possession, and the famous graveyard with stećci there was most likely the clan's main burial ground, as a number of family members, at least five, have been buried there. There are epitaphs on five medieval stećak referring to the Miloradović family.

== Ottoman period ==
During the Ottoman period, some members of the family were Christian sipahis. As Ottoman subjects, they were given privileges and possessions, some of which they used to erect churches and founded one monastery. The various family members in various times erected four of such buildings: the Church of Peter and Paul in Ošanići was built prior to 1505, its founder was duke Radoslav, the Church of St. Nicholas in Trijebanj, 15 km from the town of Stolac, is erected in 1534 as an endowment of duke Radoje Hrabren, in Klepci, the Church of the Transfiguration of Christ (St Luke), built by sipahi Milisav Hrabren-Miloradović, most likely near the end of the 16th century, and the Žitomislić monastery in 1566 by duke Petar and his brother Ivan (with the Church of the Holy Annunciation in 1603).

Brothers Petar and Vukić Hrabren founded the katun which was part of the Vlach group Donji Vlasi (transl. Lower Vlachs) of Blagaj nahiye. This katun was the largest with 127 houses and 16 unmarried persons, out of 37 katuns with a total of 1383 houses and 177 unmarried persons. At the time, Petar Stjepanovič-Hrabren, along with knezs Vukac, Pavko, Stipan and Radivoj Popratović, was included in the order of Ragusan citizens, as well as in the Ottoman timariot.

When the Ottoman feudal system, which they were part of, started falling apart in Herzegovina in the 16th and 17th centuries, the clan started dispersing itself as they felt unsafe. The Miloradovići in Dubrava remained in Ottoman service as sipahi with the Sultan's grant until the mid-17th century, when more Ottomanized nobility, which had the ruling power, pushed them aside.

== Miloradovich branch in the Russian Empire ==
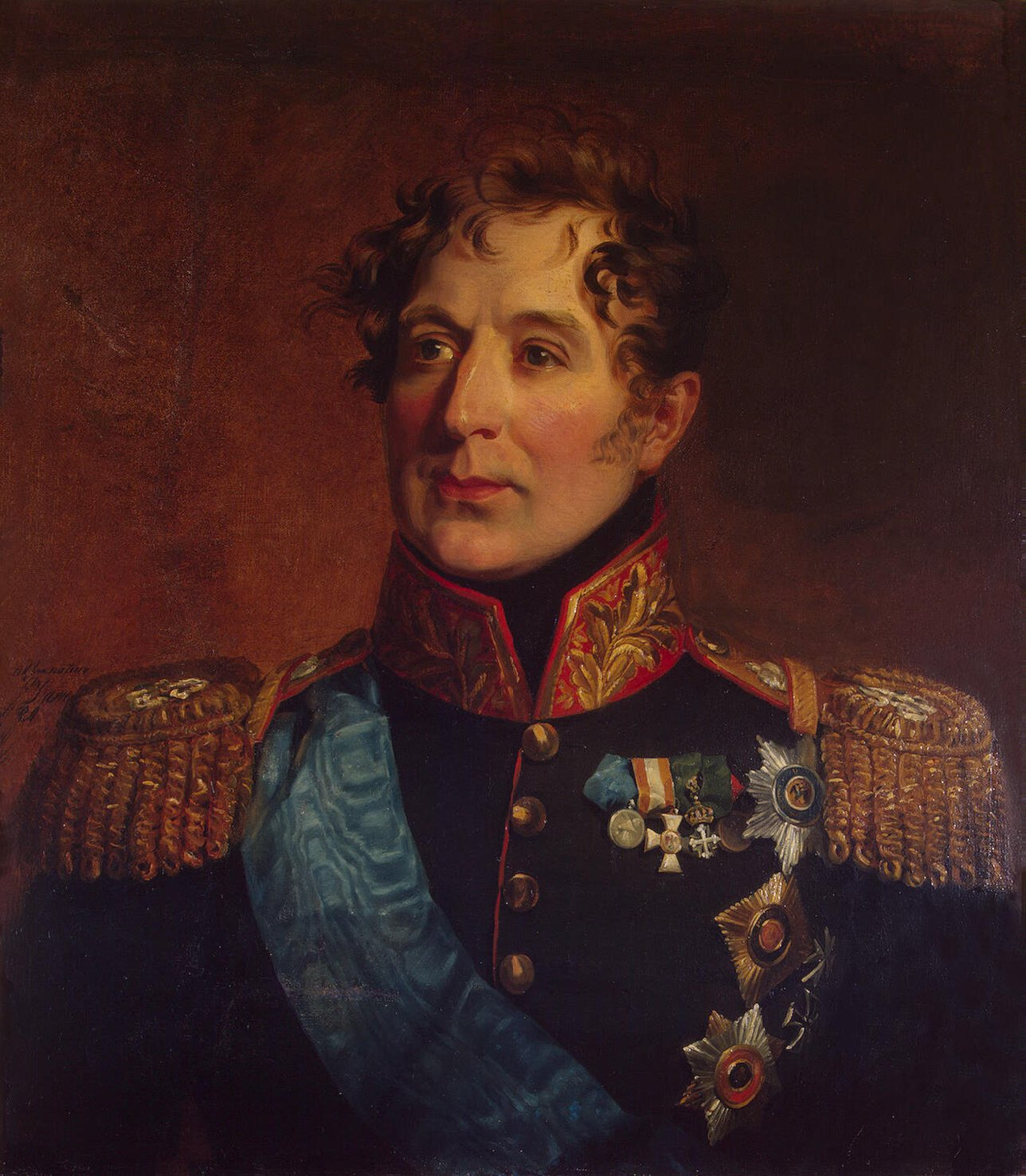
General Mikhail Miloradovich

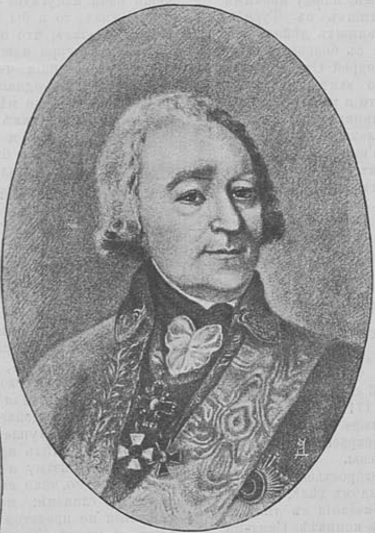
General Andrei Miloradovich

Since the 17th century some Miloradović members migrated to Russia, with occasional visits to Herzegovina carrying gifts and Church books. Mihajlo Miloradović (fl. 1707–1727) and Metropolitan Danilo I Petrović-Njegoš had been recruited by Peter I of Russia to incite rebellion in Herzegovina against the Ottomans in 1710–11 (during the Pruth River Campaign), but after unsuccessful attempts Mihailo was forced to flee Herzegovina to Little Russia where he joined Peter's service as a colonel. Among Mihailo's descendants and prominent members of this branch were his grandson Andrei Miloradovich (1726–1796), a governor, and, most importantly, Mikhail Miloradovich (1771–1825), a Russian general who stood out in the course of the Napoleonic Wars. Count Grigorije Miloradović-Hrabren (1839–1905), a Russian colonel, visited monastery Žitomislić in 1883.

== Legacy ==
Most important cultural and religious legacy of Hrabren-Miloradović are Radimlja family cemetery near Stolac, three churches, church in Klepci the end of the 16th century, 1505 church in Ošanići, 1534 church in Trijebanj, and the monastery from the second half of the 16th and the beginning of the 17th century in Žitomislić. Family members who emigrated to Russia rose to prominence, as high-ranking Imperial army officials. Those members of Miloradović-Stjepanović who remained in Žitomislić have taken collective surname Ljoljić and Kuzman, while those who converted to Islam have taken surname Opijač and today live in Dubrave at the outskirts of Stolac not far from Žitomislić. From the Dubrava family, Jeronim Miloradović-Hrabren became an Austrian officer in the 18th century.

== Annotations ==
1. Name: They are sometimes known in modern historiography by the combination of "Miloradović-Hrabren" (Милорадовић-Храбрен) or "Hrabren-Miloradović" (Храбрен-Милорадовић). The name Hrabren is derived from hrabar, meaning "brave". The surname Miloradović is patronymic derived from Milorad Hrabren. During the Ottoman period, they were mostly known as Hrabren.
