= Dolovi–Poljice stećak necropolis =

Archaeological site in Konjic, Bosnia and Herzegovina

Coordinates: 43.5785°N 18.2371°E

- Dolovi-Poljice, cultural landscape
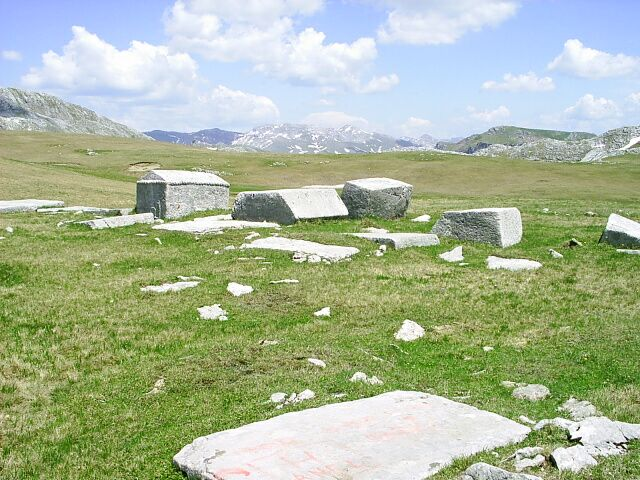
- Dolovi–Poljice stećak necropolis
- Interactive map of Dolovi–Poljice stećak necropolis

Details
- Established: 15-16th century
- Location: Odžaci, Konjic
- Country: Bosnia and Herzegovina
- Type: Medieval stećak necropolis
- Owned by: State
- No. of graves: ?
- Website: ?

KONS of Bosnia and Herzegovina
- Official name: Dolovi-Poljice, cultural landscape
- Type: Category 0 cultural property
- Designated: November 6, 2002 (-th KONS session; decision No. 01-275/02)
- Part of: The natural and architectural ensemble of Stolac
- Reference no.: 3818
- List of National Monuments of Bosnia and Herzegovina

Dolovi–Poljice stećak necropolises, are located in the immediate vicinity of the summer katun (livestock hurders' settlement) of Poljice, on the Visočica mountain, 25 km from Konjic, Bosnia and Herzegovina. In the middle of the 11th century, the area of Mount Visočica, in Župa Neretva, was annexed to the Bosnian state. From then until Ban Tvrtko I came to power in 1353, it had a special status. At the beginning of the 15th century, there was a division into the King's demesne and the feudal area of Hum under Stjepan Kosača. The border between two zemljas was roughly the river Neretva.

== Veliko jezero–Poljice necropolis ==
The locality of Veliko jezero–Poljice is located at an altitude of 1691 m above sea level, below the peak of Ljeljen. The KONS listed necropolis a National Monument of Bosnia and Herzegovina.

There are 49 stećaks in the necropolis, counted according to usual stećak form classification, 33 slabs, 10 chests and 6 gables. They are very well cut, but they are damaged and overturned. Of 49, 11 examples are decorated, including 7 slabs, 1 chest and 3 gables. Decorations include trefoil and slash trefoil border, trefoil frieze, twisted ribbon, zigzag border, simple arcades, crescent and original depictions of a man holding a child and a man with a staff, alongside a horse and a bird.

== Dolovi–Poljice necropolis ==
The locality of Dolovi–Poljica is located on the western side of the road that leads from Gornja Tušila to Odžaci (Bjelimići), at an altitude of 1479 m. The necropolis, together with the location where stone processing workshop once was, and the wider landscape, is listed a National Monument of Bosnia and Herzegovina. There are 52 stećaks in the necropolis, including 24 slabs, 22 chests, 2 gables and 4 crosses per usual stećak form classification. Decorative ornaments are recorded on seven monuments: 4 slabs, 2 gables and 1 cross. Their decorative motifs include plain and twisted band, frieze of bent vine with trefoils, band of zigzag and oblique lines, hunting scenes, chariot scenes and specific representations of woman and dragon, as well as woman, horseman and dragon.

== Inscriptions on stećaks ==
On two stećaks there are inscriptions written in Bosnian Cyrillic: The transcription of the inscription on the cross-shaped one reads: A SE LEŽI NA POKON I RABRENЬ VUKIĆЬ DOLINOVIĆЬ. Above the inscription there is a motif of a cross in a circle, the arms of which in extension end as circles. Above the decoration of the cross there is a semicircular arch, while in the gable there is a half-apple motif. The decoration is made with a combination of relief protrusions and recesses, dating after 1496.

Inscription on the gable: † VA IME OCA I SINA, SVETOGA DUHA A SE LEŽI VUKOSAVЬ LUPČIĆЬ (LUPOVČIĆЬ) †. On the eastern side, there is a representation of a horseman attacking a dragon with a spear that has already taken a woman's hand, while above the horseman's head there is part of an inscription. In the upper part of the stećak, under the edges of the roof surfaces, on all four sides of the stećak, there is a vine with a trefoil under which there is a twisted ribbon. On the western side, there is a shrine with several animals.

== Query and workshop area ==
Near Dolovi–Poljice necropolis, at a distance of up to 200 m, a quarry was found, and another at a distance of up to 500 m in the northwest direction, where the stones were cut and finished stećaks processed and decorated.

== Bibliography ==
- Šefik Bešlagić, STEĆCI – KULTURA I UMJETNOST, Veselin Masleša Sarajevo, 1982.
- Pavao Anđelić, Historijski spomenici Konjica i okoline, I, Skupština opštine, Konjic, 1975.
- Pavao Anđelić, Teritorijalnopolitička organizacija srednjovjekovne župe Neretve i njezino mjesto u širim političkim okvirima in Studije o teritorijalnopolitičkoj organizaciji srednjovjekovne Bosne, Sarajevo, 1982.
- Vesna Mušeta-Aščerić, Sarajevo i njegova okolina u 15. stoljeću, Sarajevo, 2005, 2006.
- Group of authors, Prirodna baština Kantona Sarajevo, Sarajevo, 2008, 2009.
