= Ćorluka =

Origin
- Language: Croatian

Ćorluka (pronounced [t͡ɕǒrluka]) is a Croatian and Serbian family name.

In the 17th century, a Ćorluka family fled Vid when the Ottomans destroyed it, and this family dispersed to Klobuk, Grude and Mamići. On June 26/27, 1941, Ustaše drove away 130 Croats of the families of Šakota, Šotra, Ćorluka and Krulj from the villages of Trijebanj and Kozice. Ethnic Serbs of the family were killed in the Prebilovci massacre.

It may refer to:

- Josip Ćorluka (born 1995), Bosnian footballer
- Slavko Ćorluka, army commander
- Vedran Ćorluka (born 1986), Croatian footballer
- Verica Ćorluka, writer
- Ćorluke, a village
