= Daorson =

Archaeological site in the Neretva River

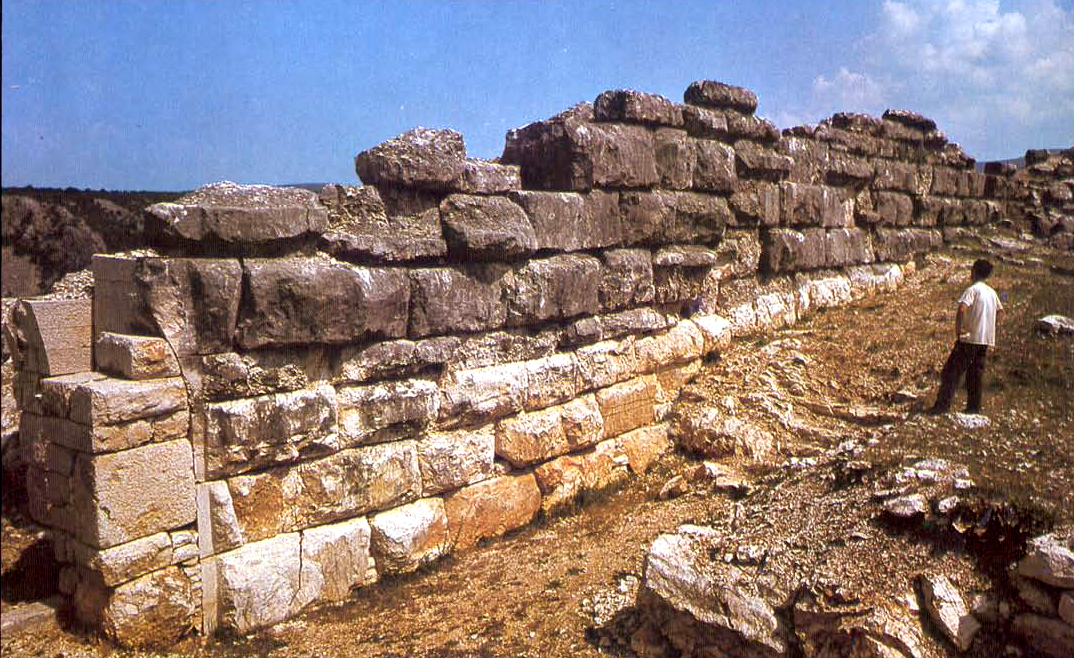
- Cyclopean walls of ancient Daorson.

- Location within Bosnia and Herzegovina
- Interactive map of Daorson
- Type: Megalithic settlement
- Periods: Classical, Hellenistic, Roman
- Cultures: Illyrian, Roman
- Location: Ošanići, Stolac, Bosnia and Herzegovina
- Region: Illyria, Dalmatia

Site notes
- Owner: Public

KONS of Bosnia and Herzegovina
- Official name: Archaeological area - the Hellenistic city of Daorson in Ošanići near Stolac
- Type: Category 0 cultural property
- Criteria: A, B, C iii.iv.v.vi., D i.iv., F i.iii., G iv., H i., I i.ii.iii.
- Designated: 21 January 2003
- Part of: Stolac, natural and architectural ensemble
- Reference no.: 605
- Decision no.: 01-275/02
- Listed: List of National Monuments of Bosnia and Herzegovina

Daorson was the capital of the Illyrian tribe of the Daorsi (Ancient Greek Δαόριζοι, Δαούρσιοι; Latin Daorsei). The Daorsi lived in the valley of the Neretva River between 300 BC and 50 BC. They came very early into contact with Greek traders acquiring many facies of Greek civilization, and the town acquired a certain degree of Hellenization. After the peace treaty with Rome in 168/167 BC, the Daorsi minted their own coins.

The ruins of Daorson are located at Ošanjići, near Stolac, Bosnia and Herzegovina.

== History ==
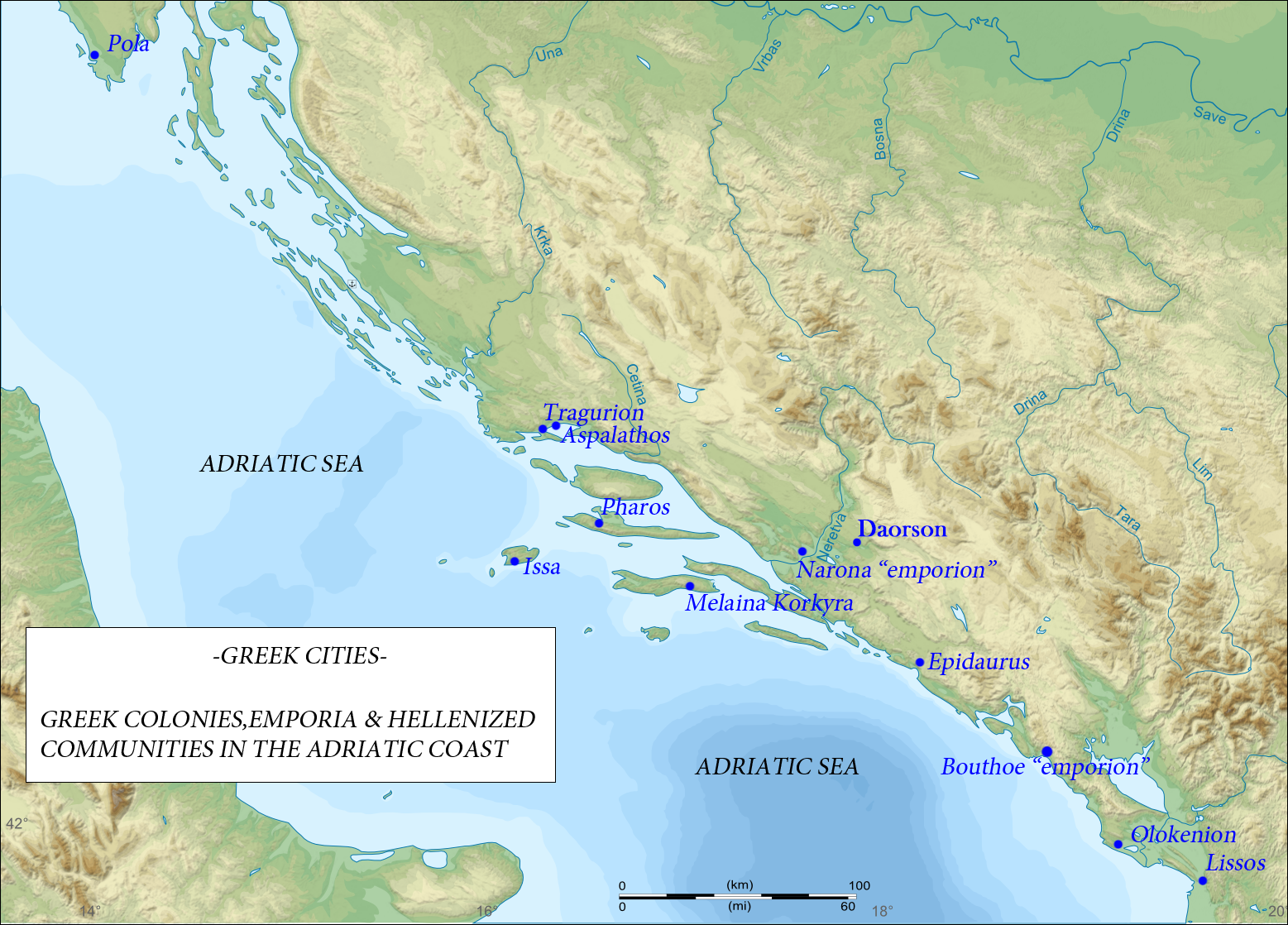
Map depicting the Adriatic Sea region in Pre-Roman time.

Illyrian Coin found at Daorson, Bosnia and Herzegovina.

Daorson was built around a central fort or acropolis, surrounded by cyclopean walls made of huge stone blocks (similar to those in Mycenae, in Greece). The acropolis would have housed all of the important administrative, public and religious buildings. The defensive wall extending from southwest to northeast was 65 metres long, 4.2 metres wide, and from 4.5 to 7.5 metres high with doors and towers on both sides.

The remnants of numerous wine amphorae have been found, including some ceramic fragments. The most valuable of the finds is a bronze helmet decorated with a series of mythological figures. The inscription on it is similar to the inscription on a helmet found in North Macedonia. The remnants of a granite sculpture of Cadmus and Harmonia have also been found. This piece includes an Illyrian relief with thirteen snakes and five pairs of eagle wings. A small building housed a mint facility. Thirty-nine different coins were discovered in this building, the majority (29) depicted King Ballaios, who ruled after 168 BC. Money was of immense importance to the Daorsi, allowing the tribe to remain independent while securing their business, cultural and trade links with other groups.

After the Daorsi were attacked by the Delmatae, they joined Issa in seeking the protection of the Roman state. The Daorsi abandoned Caravantius and fought on the side of the Romans, contributing their strong navy. After the Illyrian Wars the Romans gave the Daorsi immunity.

== Site description ==
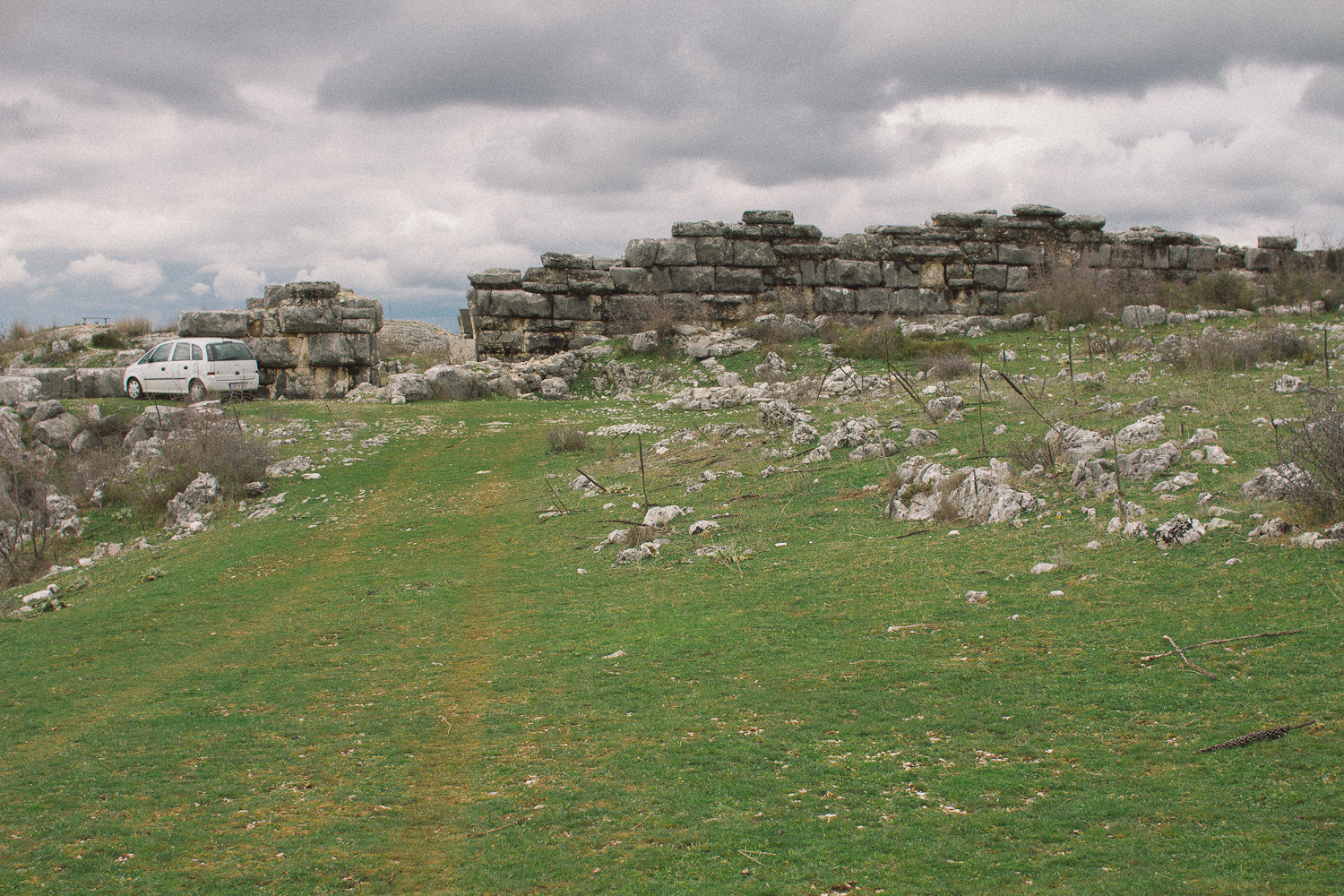
Remains of the outer walls of Daorson, as seen in 2013.

Ošanići consist of three linked stones groups, the disposition of which is dictated by the lie of the land.

The central area is occupied by a dominant hill fort or acropolis below and to the south and south-west of which are terraces on the ridge, while to the east, on the Banje plateau, is the outer-acropolis area of residential and commercial, mainly artisanal and trade quarters of the settlement.

The hill fort was built on a prehistoric fortified settlement which had been in existence there since the early (17/16th century BCE) to the end of the late Bronze Age (9/8th century BCE). The date of the ransacking of the town of Daorson that finally put an end to human settlement there can be determined with fair accuracy as the mid or second half of the 1st century BCE from the details of the wars waged by the Roman Praetor Vatinius against the Delmati. No permanent settlement ever arose on the ruins of the town of Daors. There is ample evidence of its advanced culture and civilization: it minted its own coins and produced complex artistically decorated buckles, there is graffiti on shards of pottery vessels, and parts of stone statues of human figures some 2 m in height were found.

A megalithic wall, erected following the line of the land, has been dated to the 4th century BCE, when both towers were probably built following the construction of the wall. The rest of the acropolis is of later date, through to the 1st century BCE. One of the most important finds is a helmet with the Greek inscription ΠΙИ, probably the abbreviated Illyrian name of the owner PINNES; it was probably made in the 3rd century BCE.

== Protection ==
Daorson is designated National monument of Bosnia and Herzegovina, and, including the nearby Radimlja necropolis, and other individual sites outside the city of Stolac perimeter, is designated as The natural and architectural ensemble of Stolac and proposed for inscription into the UNESCO's World Heritage Site list. The bid for inscription is currently placed on the UNESCO Tentative list.

== See also ==
- List of ancient Illyrian cities
- List of ancient Illyrians
- Neretva
- Prehistoric Europe

== Bibliography ==
- Lippert, Andreas; Matzinger, Joachim (2021). Die Illyrer: Geschichte, Archäologie und Sprache. Stuttgart: Kohlhammer Verlag. ISBN 9783170377103.
- Šašel Kos, M.; Kos, P. (2013). "Places: 197421 (Ošanići)". Pleiades.
- Stipčević, Aleksandar (1977), The Illyrians: History and Culture, Noyes Press, ISBN 978-0-8155-5052-5
- Wilkes, John J. (1992). The Illyrians. Oxford: Blackwell Publishing. ISBN 0-631-19807-5.
