= Šakota =

Origin
- Languages: Serbian, Croatian
- Meaning: šaka, meaning "hand".

Šakota (Serbian Cyrillic: Шакота) is a Serbian and Croatian surname, derived from a nickname itself from the word šaka, meaning "hand".

On June 2, 1941, Franjo Sudar's Ustaše attacked the Udrežnje village and killed 27 people of the Vujadinović, Vukosav, Draganić, Gambelić, Kljakić, Šipovac and Šakota families. On June 3/4, 1941, Ustaše massacred 130 to 180 ethnic Serbs in Korita, Bileća; the local Šakota were one of the victim families. On June 26/27, 1941, Ustaše drove away 130 Serbs of the families of Šakota, Šotra, Ćorluka and Krulj from the villages of Trijebanj and Kozice. 110 of these were killed, at Domanoviće, Bivolja Brda, Pileti and near Kukauš, and those who escaped death were those listed in a proclamation of general Lakse. 70 more locals were killed by the Ustaše on June 29/30. At least 64 individuals with the surname died at the Jasenovac concentration camp. Several Šakota from Herzegovina fought at the Yugoslav Front (Dušan, Ilija, Jovo, Radovan, Slobodan, Sava, Vlado, and others).

It may refer to:

- Dušan Šakota (born 1986), Serbian-born Greek professional basketball player, son of Dragan
- Dragan Šakota (born 1952), Serbian professional basketball coach
- Ilija Šakota,
- Luka Šakota, Croatian runner (2013 European Athletics Junior Championships – Men's 100 metres)
- Mirjana Šakota, Serbian writer
- Slavko Šakota,
- Slobodan Šakota, Yugoslav Partisan
- Ranko Šakota, butcher in South Africa
