= Šotra =

Origin
- Language: Serbo-Croatian

Šotra (Serbian Cyrillic: Шотра) is a Serbian surname.

On June 26/27, 1941, Ustaše drove away 130 Serbs of the families of Šakota, Šotra, Ćorluka and Krulj from the villages of Trijebanj and Kozice.

It may refer to:

- Zdravko Šotra (1933–2025), Serbian film and television director and screenwriter
- Tamara Savić-Šotra (born 1971), Serbian fencer
