= Sotra (disambiguation) =

Sotra may refer to:

- Sahotra, Valmiki tribe in India and Pakistan
- Sotra, an archipelago in Norway
- Sotra Facula, a cryovolcano located on Titan
- SOTRA, the Abidjan transport company
- Šotra, a Serbian surname
