= Stećak necropolis Radimlja =

Medieval necropolis near Stolac, Bosnia and Herzegovina

Coordinates: 43°5′32″N 17°55′27″E

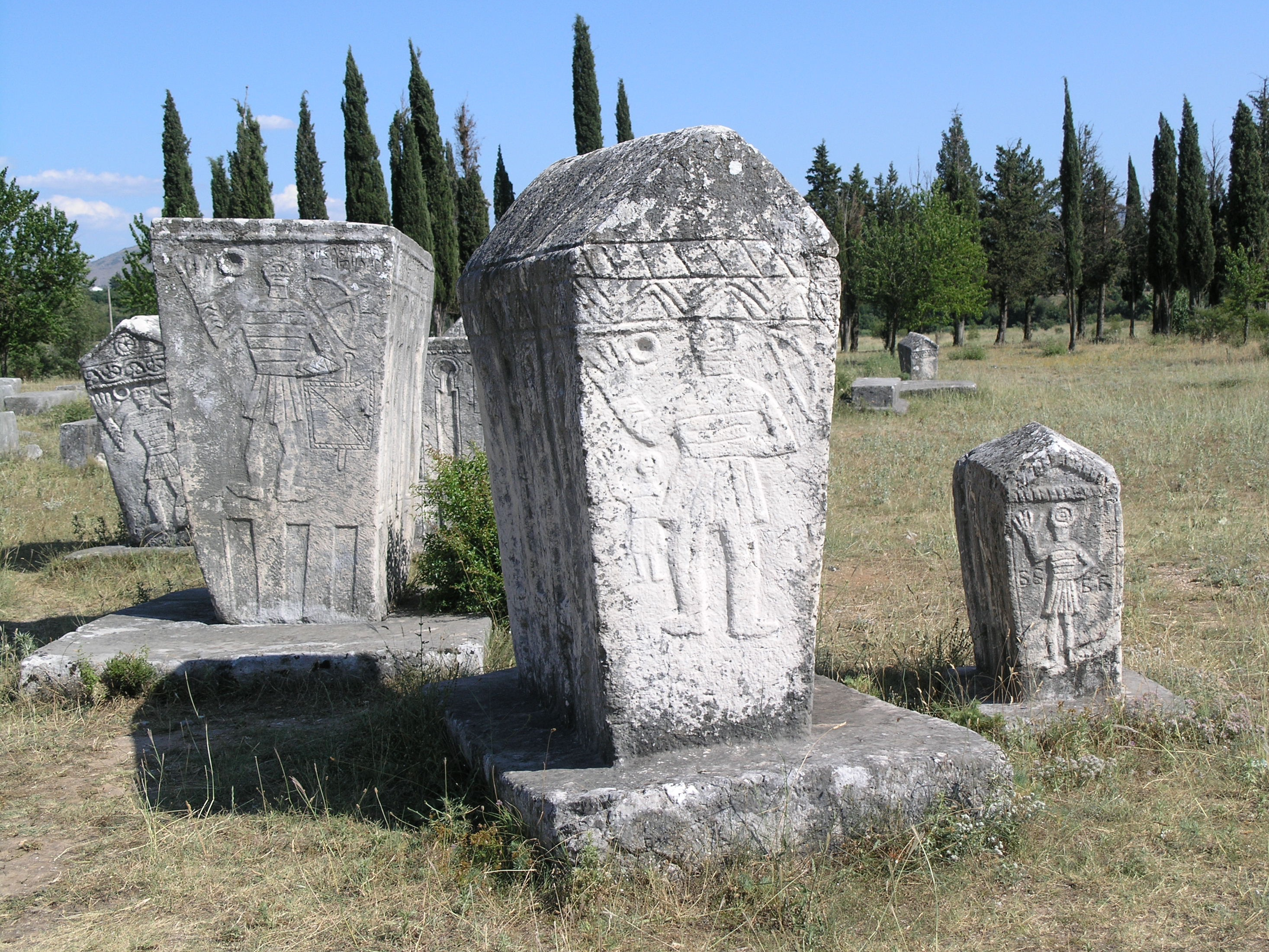
- Radimlja stećak necropolis
- Interactive map of Stećak necropolis Radimlja

Details
- Established: 15–16th century
- Location: Ošanjići, Stolac
- Country: Bosnia and Herzegovina
- Type: Medieval stećak necropolis
- Owned by: State
- No. of graves: ?
- Website: ?

KONS of Bosnia and Herzegovina
- Official name: Stećaks' necropolis near the Ošanjići, Stolac
- Type: Category 0 cultural property
- Designated: November 6, 2002 (-th session)
- Part of: The natural and architectural ensemble of Stolac
- Reference no.: 607
- Decision no.: 01-275/02
- Listed: List of National Monuments of Bosnia and Herzegovina

UNESCO World Heritage Site
- Official name: Stećaks' necropolis near the Ošanjići, Stolac
- Type: Cultural
- Reference no.: 1504-001
- Region: Europe

Radimlja (Serbian Cyrillic: Радимља) is a stećak necropolis located near Stolac, Bosnia and Herzegovina. It is located in Vidovo polje, 3 km west of Stolac, on the Čapljina–Stolac road. The Radimlja necropolis is one of the most valuable monuments of the medieval period in Bosnia and Herzegovina. It is protected by UNESCO and designated as a part of the World Heritage List.

== History ==
The earliest tombstones can be dated to the second half of the 12th century and the first half of the 13th century. However, the majority of the stećak tombstones date from the 1480s through the 16th century, as evidenced by the epitaph on one of the tombstones. This was the period when the family Miloradović-Stjepanović from genus Hrabren lived in the settlement located on a nearby hill Ošanići. At the time the location was known as Batnoge, and the creation of the necropolis coincides with the rise of this noble family.

Miloradović-Stjepanović family from the genus Hrabren were of the Orthodox faith. The founder was Milorad, who as a Vlach chieftain (cattlemen and warriors organization) lived in the second half of the 14th century. In 1416 his son Stipan is mentioned, in appeal by Ragusa due to fighting along with Petar Pavlović against Sandalj Hranić and the Ottomans. He had three sons: Petar Stjepanović was first mentioned in 1473 and last time in 1486. Radoja Stjepanović died between 1475 and 1477. Vukić Stjepanović was mentioned for last time in 1496.

They were titled as voivodes and knezes, commanded Vlach military institution and held land between Stolac and Mostar. They successfully merged into the Ottoman political and social system. The katun formation by Petar and Vukić Hrabren was part of the Vlach group Donji Vlasi (Lower Vlachs) of nahiye Blagaj – and their katun was the largest with 127 houses and 16 unmarried persons out of 37 katuns, 1383 houses and 177 unmarried persons. At the time Petar Stjepanovič-Hrabren along knezes Vukac, Pavko, Stipan and Radivoj Popratović was included in the order of Raguzan citizens, as well was Ottoman timariot. By 1505, when voivode Radosav Hrabren was buried, the necropolis expansion began to end due to acceptance of Islam, the disintegration of tribal organization, and social events.

Those members of Miloradović-Stjepanović who remained in Žitomislić have taken collective surname Ljoljić and Kuzman, while those who converted to Islam have taken surname Opijač and today live in Dubrava near Stolac. From the Dubrava branch, Jeronim Miloradović-Hrabren became an Austrian officer in the 18th century. Other branches migrated to Russia and became famous nobility of the Russian Empire, between circa 15th and 19th centuries, such as Grigorije Miloradović-Hrabren who became a count and a Russian colonel, while Mikhail Miloradovich was prominent Russian general during the Napoleonic Wars.

== Characteristics ==
The necropolis includes 133 stećci. When the Čapljina-Stolac road was built during the Austro-Hungarian period in 1882, it ran through the necropolis and destroyed at least 15–20 tombstones. Out of nine types of stećci, 36 slabs, 1 slab with pedestal, 27 chests, 24 chests with pedestal, 4 tall chests, 5 tall chests with pedestal, 2 sarcophagi (i.e. ridge/gable), 31 sarcophagi with pedestal, and 3 of cruciform.

The core of the necropolis was built at the end of the 14th century, when three big chests were made, of which two are richly decorated with motifs in bas-relief. The next phase included simple chests (sanduk) and gable-shaped (sljemenaci) with flower crosses on the front and borders acanthus leaves. The last phase with circa 20 separate stećci of high quality and diverse forms indicates that the site was the cemetery of the Miloradović-Stjepanović family, attested in epitaphs on five tombstones.

Due to several Illyrian burial mounds near the necropolis, it seems the location was used from earlier times as a resting place for the dead, and the population of Batnoge continued this ancient sepulchral tradition. During the 1960s excavation, to a depth of 120–135 cm revealed nine graves, indicating that up to 50 specimens were destroyed. Analysis of the bodies showed the people were tall with well-developed thoraxes.

== Decoration ==
Nearly half (63) were decorated, in bas relief, engraving or a combination. The finest decorated examples are tall chests with pedestal and sarcophagus with pedestal, saved for the social elite.

Ornaments include curved lines with trefoil, plastic zigzag, radial circle, rosette, depiction of plastic circles, cluster, rod shaped as letter T, spiral curves. The depiction of arrow and bow on "voivode" stećci previously was related to Miloradović-Stjepanović military function.

Figural depictions can be divided to those of male figures with raised right hand (on so-called voivode stećci by Miloradović-Stjepanović, or stećci that symbolize Vitus), and scenes of hunting, posthumous kolo and chivalric tournaments with basic artistic and religious interweaving of pagan and Christian ideas.

The inscriptions mention Stipan Miloradović, and his sons Radoja and Petar, three other inhabitants of Batnoge, and three stonemasons: Miogost, Volašin Vogačić, Ratko Brativo(n)ić.

The stećci were made of limestone cut from Ošanići hill, trimmed and then moved to the necropolis for final work and ornamentation.

== Inscriptions ==
I: A se kami na Vukcu na Pet[r]oviču. A se pisa Bolašin Bogačić.

II: A Vlač Vlahov[i]č, [a sječe k]ami Ratko Brativo[n]ič/Brativo[jev]ič.

III: Az rab b[o]ži Radoje Vuković, sinovac vojevode Petra.

IV: Sije leži dobri Radoje, sin vojevode Stipana, n[a] svoj baštini na Batnogah. Si bilig postavi na me brat moj vojevoda Petar.

V: A se leži Stjepan. A činio ka[mi] Miogost kovač.

== Gallery ==
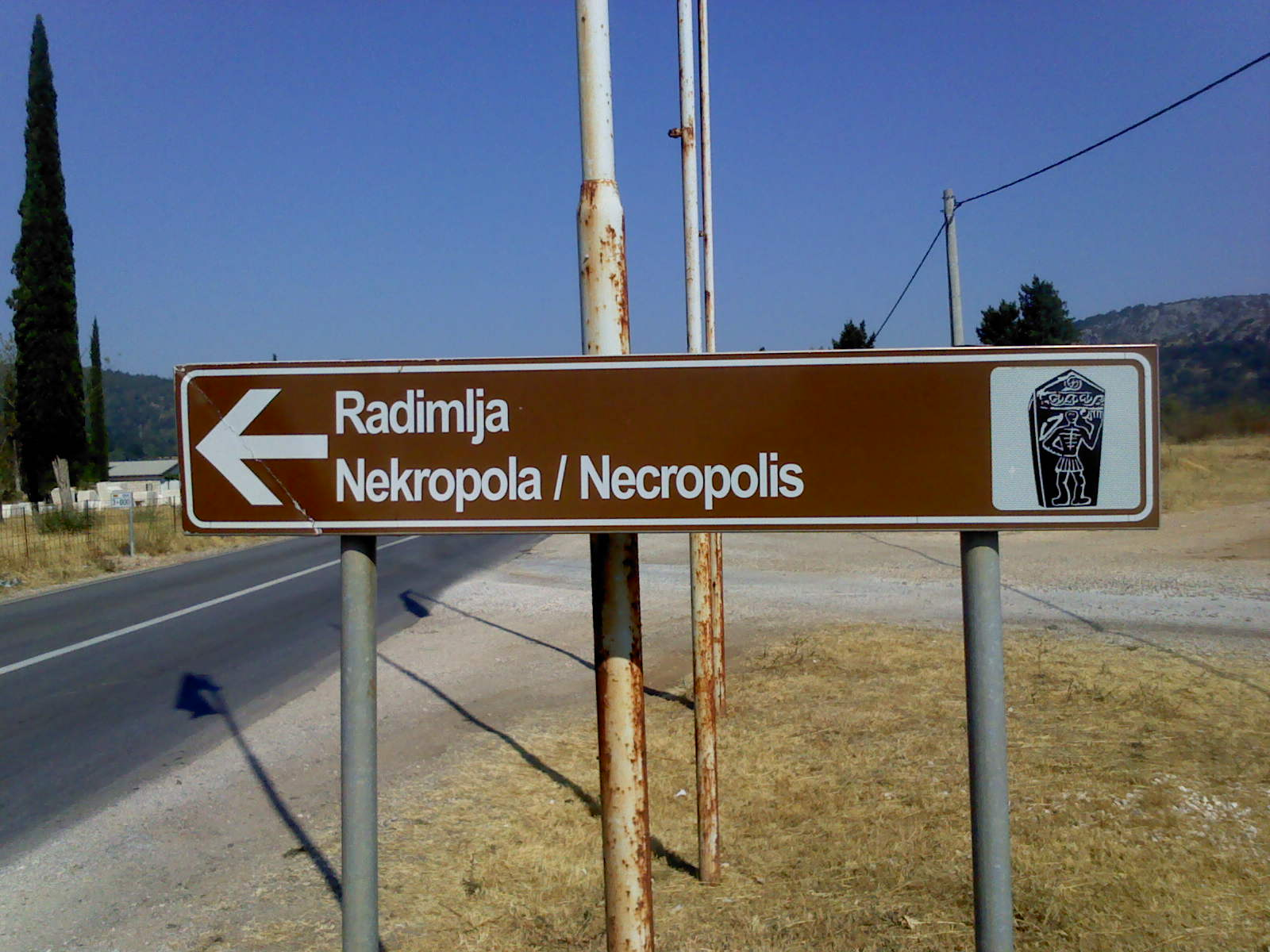
Sign at the entrance to Radimlja

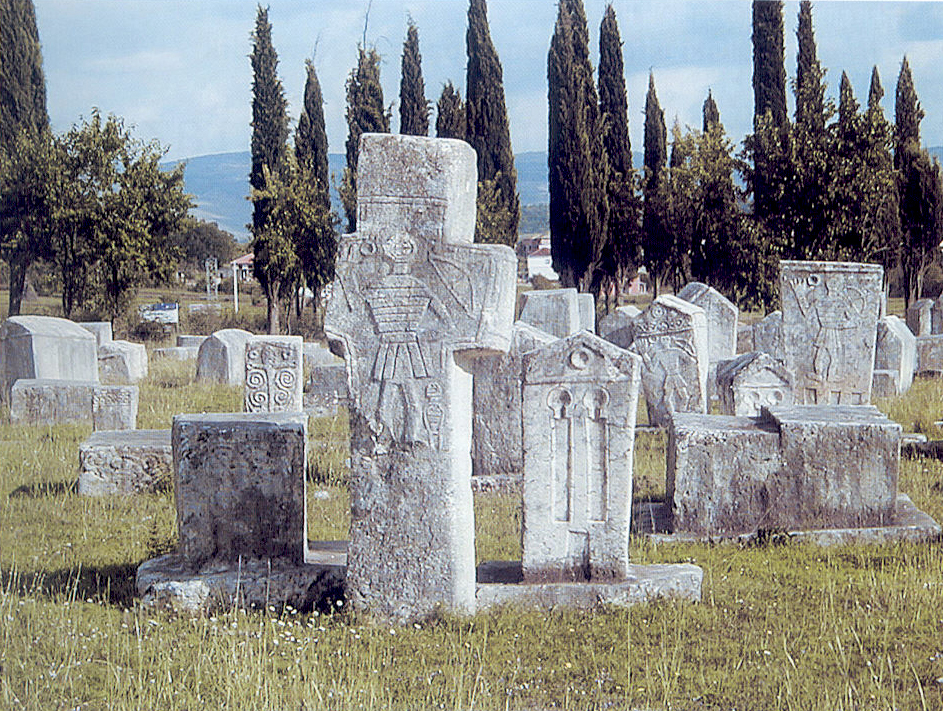

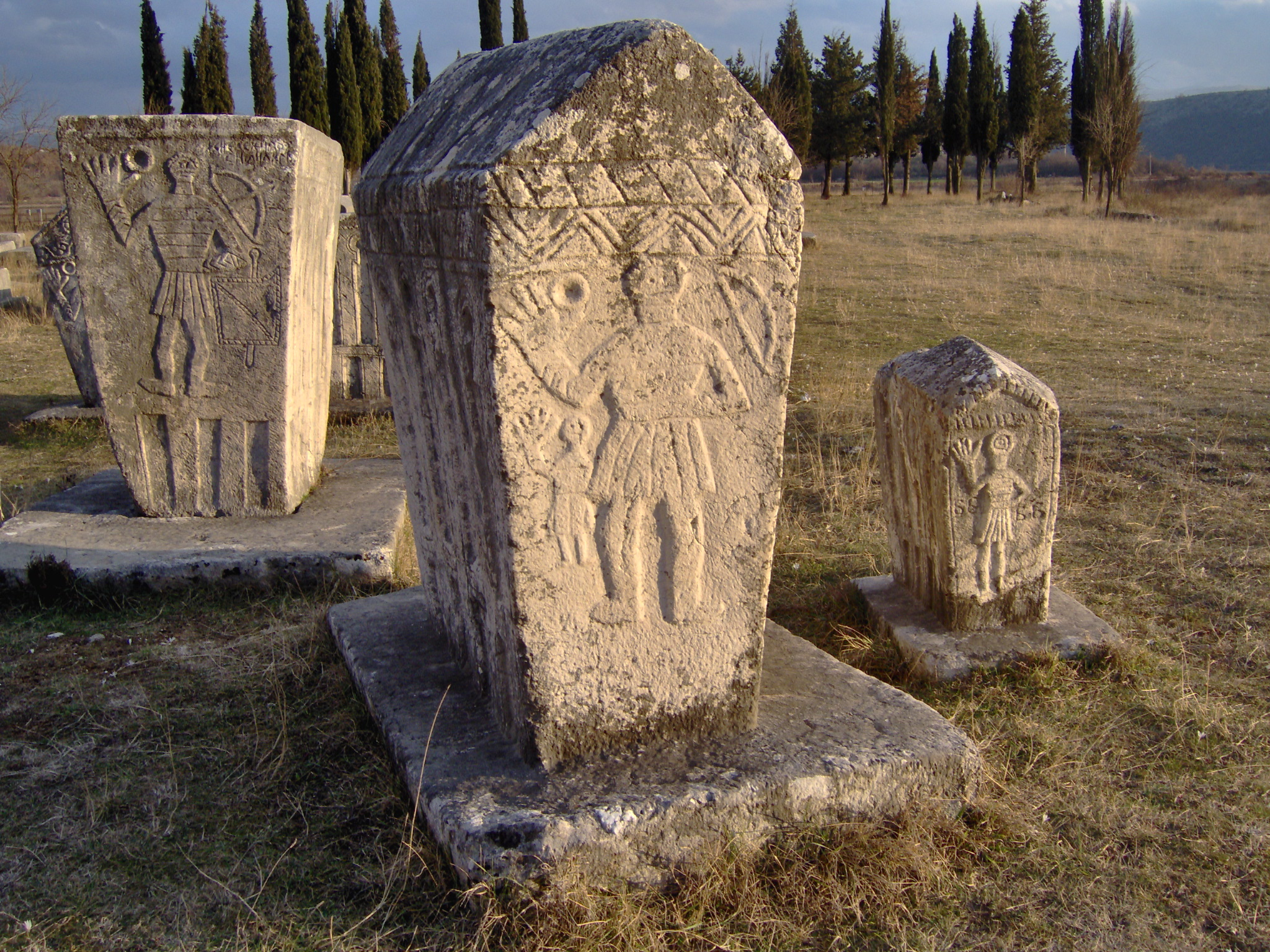

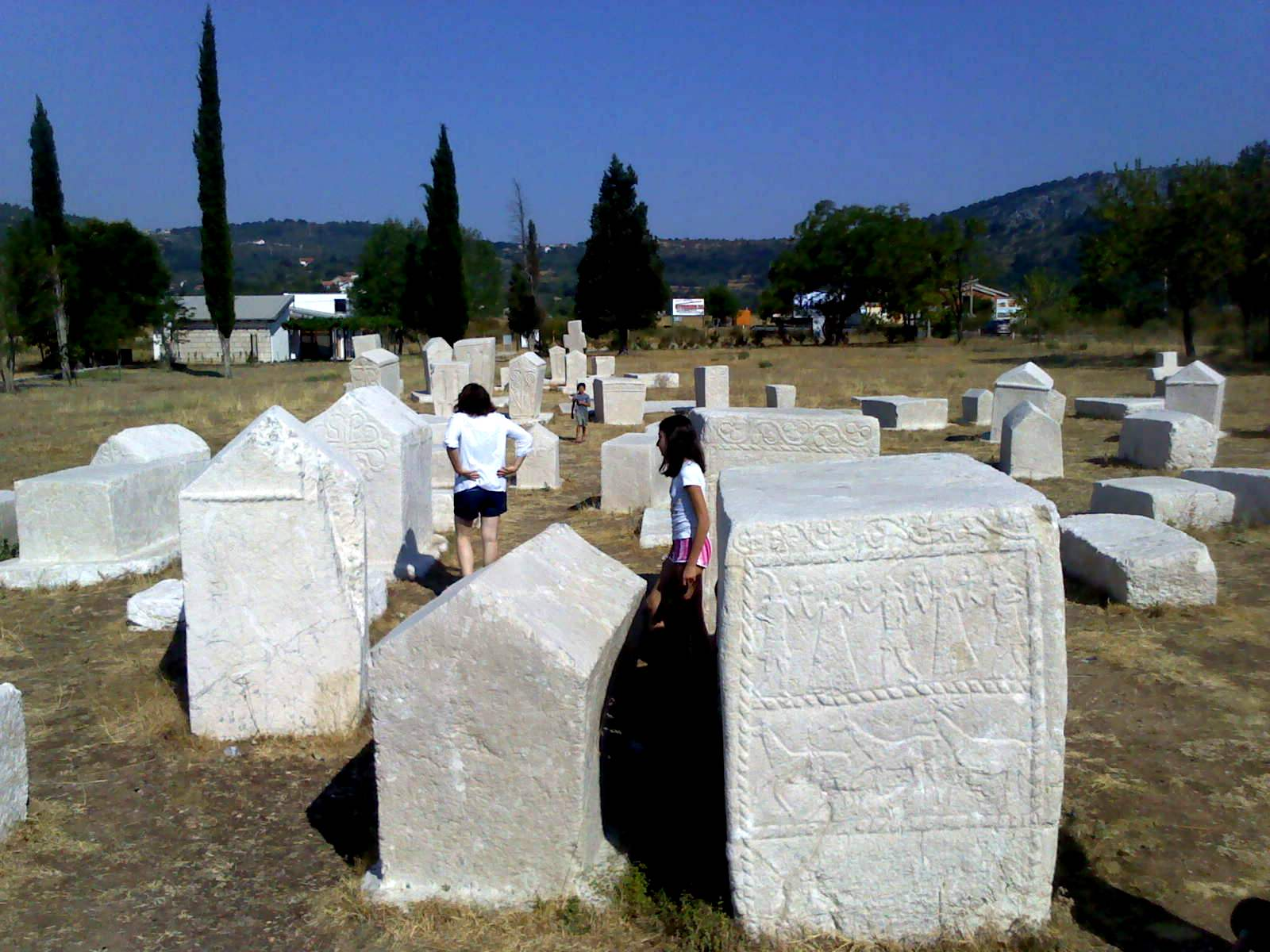

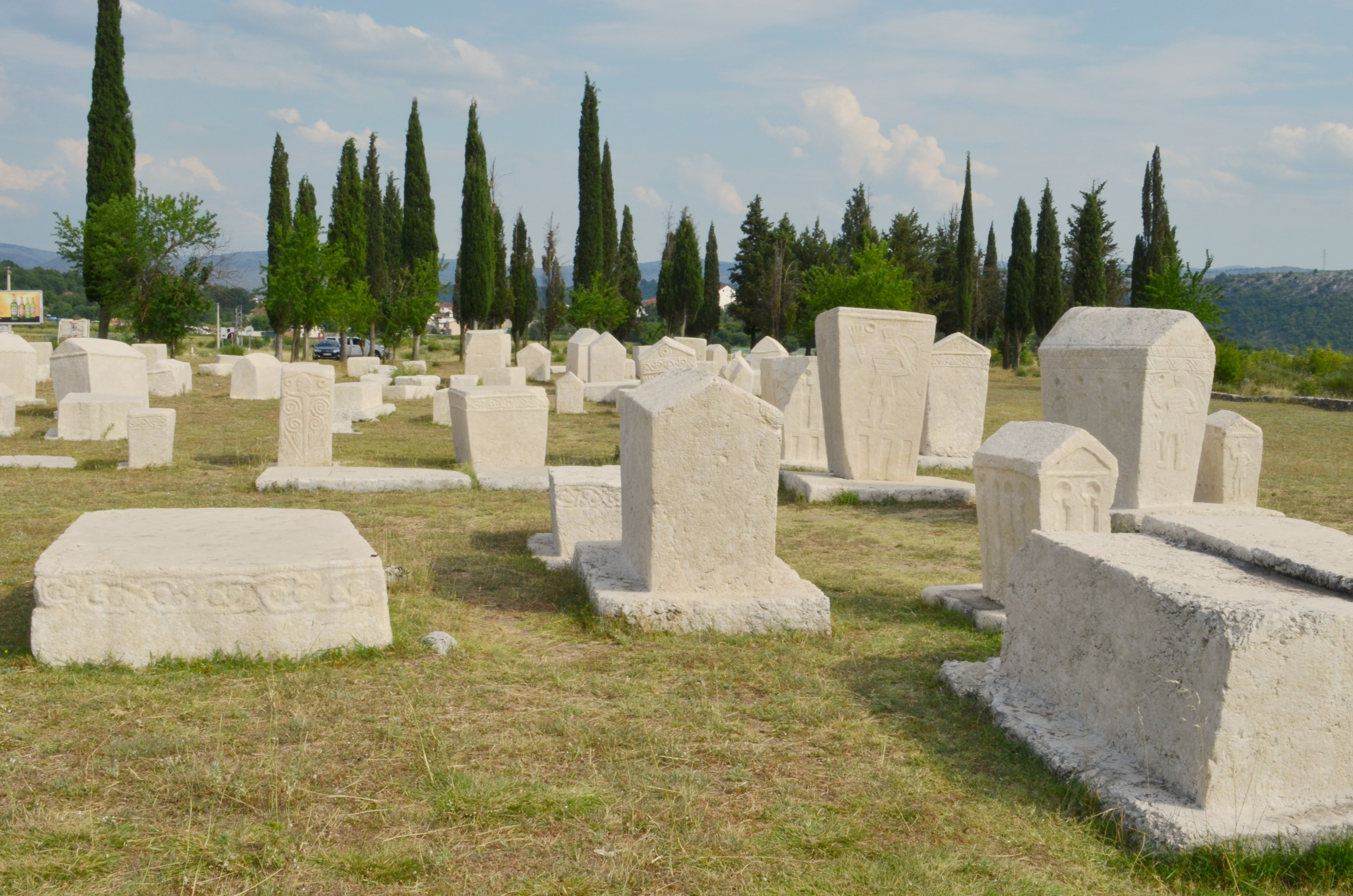

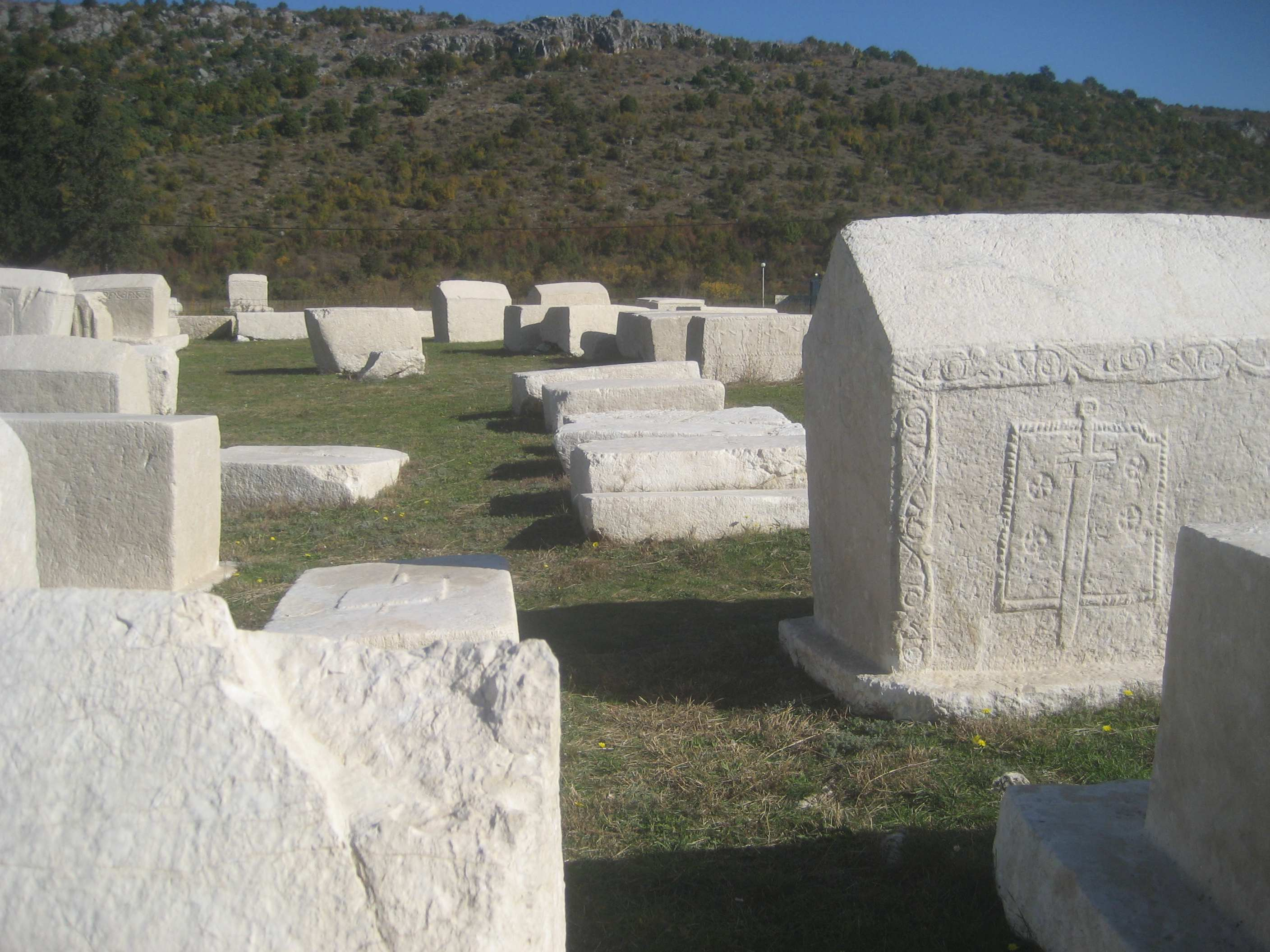

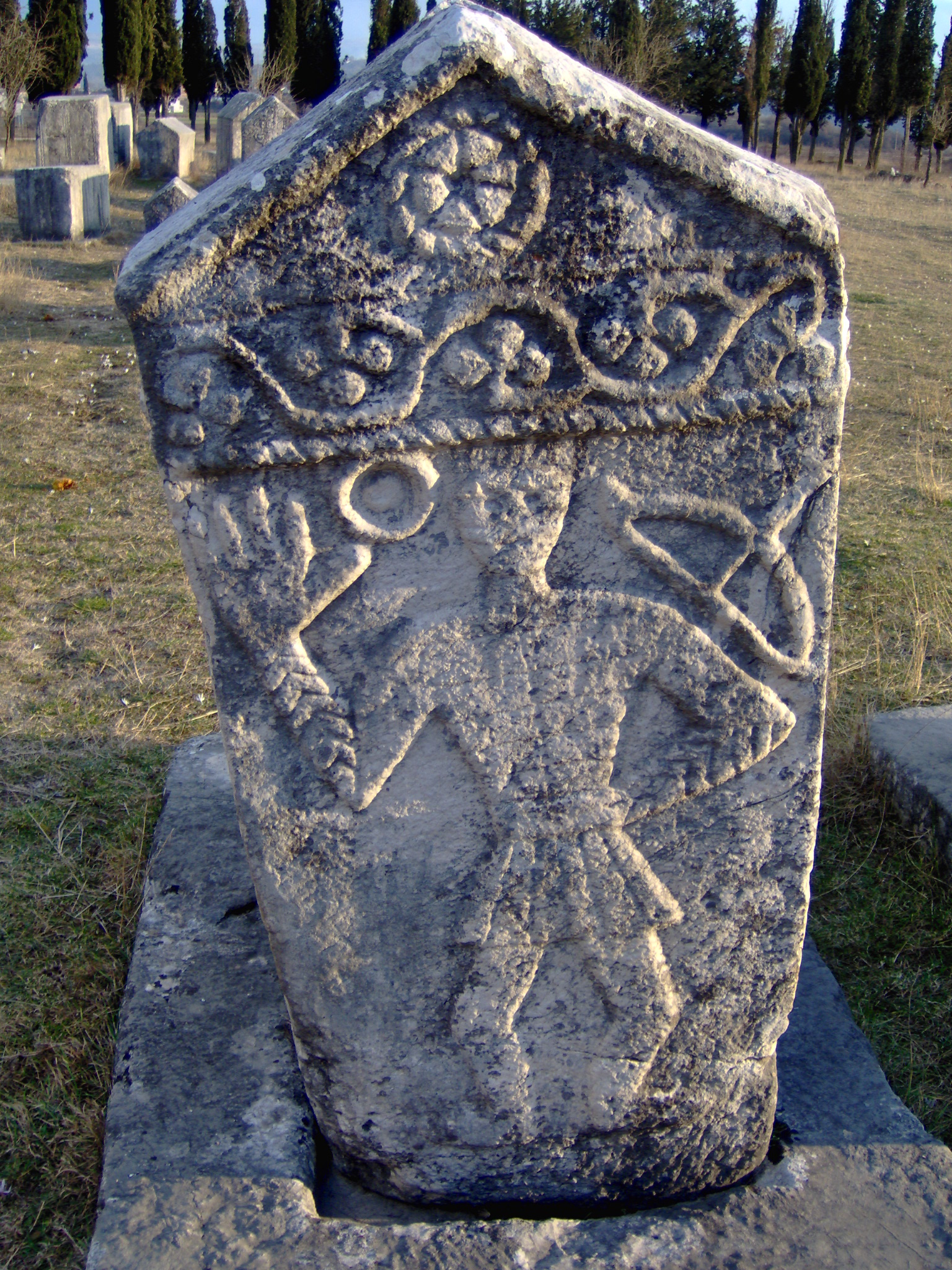

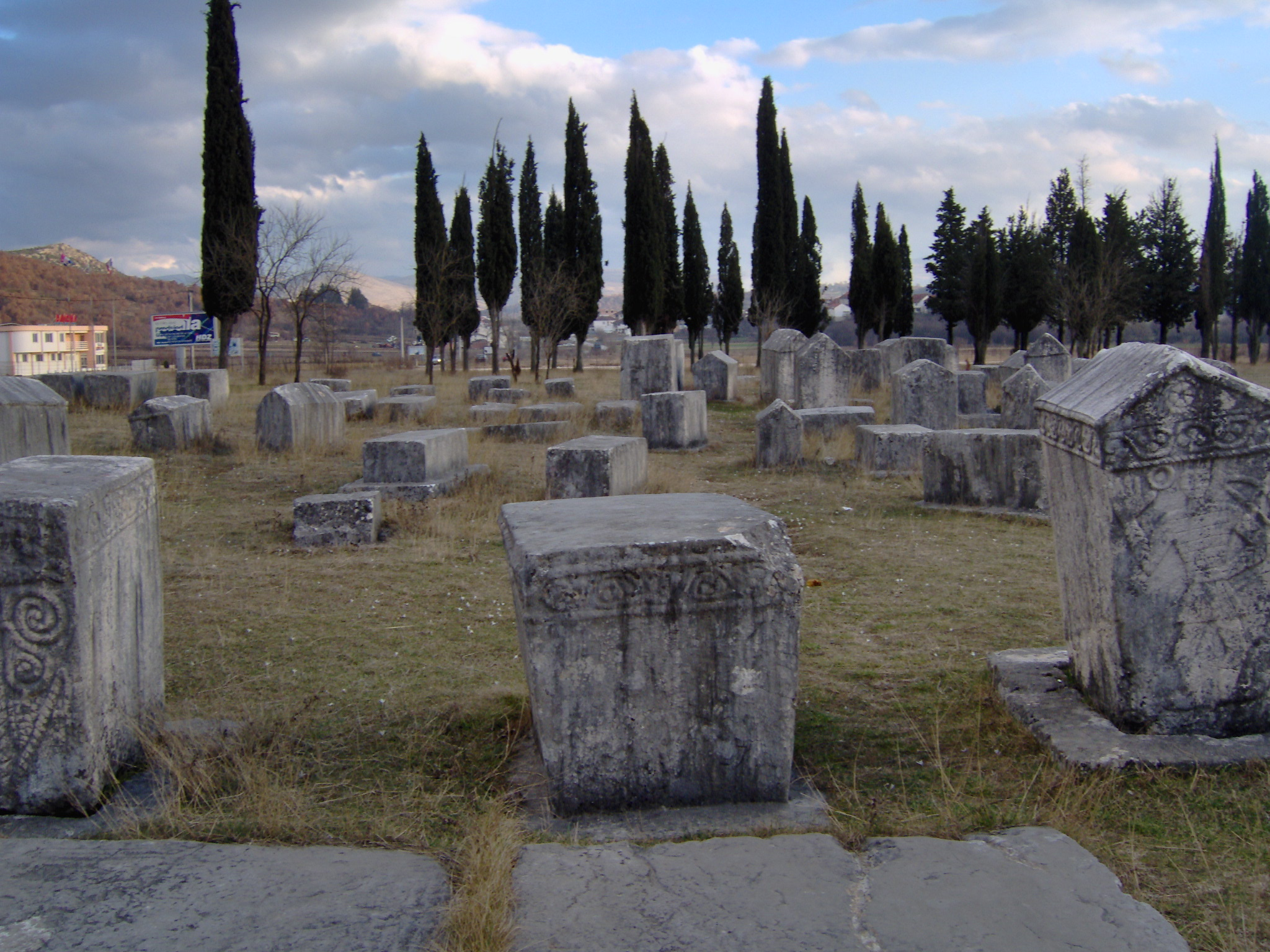

== See also ==
- List of World Heritage Sites in Bosnia and Herzegovina
- List of National Monuments of Bosnia and Herzegovina

== Sources ==
- Lovrenović, Dubravko (2013). Stećci: Bosansko i humsko mramorje srednjeg vijeka [Stećci: Bosnian and Hum marbles from Middle Age] (in Croatian). Ljevak. ISBN 9789533035468.
