= Kozice, Stolac =

Kozice Козице
- Location within Bosnia and Herzegovina
- Country: Bosnia and Herzegovina
- Entity: Federation of Bosnia and Herzegovina
- Canton: Herzegovina-Neretva
- Municipality: Stolac

Area
  - Total: 1.60 sq mi (4.15 km^{2})

Population (2013)
  - Total: 145
  - Density: 90.5/sq mi (34.9/km^{2})
- Time zone: UTC+1 (CET)
  - Summer (DST): UTC+2 (CEST)

Kozice (Serbian Cyrillic: Козице) is a village in the municipality of Stolac in Bosnia and Herzegovina. According to the 1991 census the village had a population of 126 people.

== History ==
On June 26/27, 1941, the Ustaše drove away 130 Serbs from the Šakota, Šotra, Ćorluka and Krulj families from the villages of Trijebanj and Kozice. 110 of them were killed, at Domanović, Bivolja Brda, Pileti and near Kukauš, and those who escaped death were those listed in a proclamation of general Lakse. 70 more locals were killed by the Ustaše on June 29/30.

== Demographics ==
=== 1991 ===
According to the 1991 census the village had a population of 126 people.

- 120 Serbs (95.24%)
- 5 Croats (3.97%)
- 1 other (0.79%)

According to the 2013 census, its population was 145.

Ethnicity in 2013
Ethnicity	Number	Percentage
Croats	109	75.2%
Serbs	36	24.8%
Total	145	100%

== People ==
- Zdravko Šotra (born 1933), Serbian and former Yugoslav film and television director
