= Žitomislić =

Žitomislić may refer to:

- Žitomislić (village), located near Mostar, Bosnia and Herzegovina
- Žitomislić Monastery, Serbian Orthodox monastery near the village
