= Stećak forms =

Shapes of stećak tombstones, Bosnia and Herzegovina

Drawing of a one stećak representative of Radimlja Necropolis.

Stećak forms, that is, shapes and dimensions of the megalithic tombstone known as stećak, come in varying sizes and orientations.

The very basic division of stećak is between lying or horizontal and standing or vertical ones, which was introduced by Dimitrije Sergejevski in 1952. The first group includes stećci in the form of a slab, a chest (or box), a chest with a pedestal, a gable and a gable with a pedestal, while the second group includes stećci with two forms - columns and crosses. In addition to these basic forms, which have several subtypes and variants, there are also amorphous stećci, which are simplest ones and usually without any elaborate finishing decorations or inscriptions.

In the 13th century, the population of medieval Bosnia and Hum lived in difficult and unsettled political and economic conditions, mostly in a situation where they fiercely defended themselves against Hungarian pretensions, which had reflected in the standard of living, culture, including in the cutting and carving the stećaks. This can to some extent explain the certain poverty of the shape, decorations and inscriptions of the stećak of the 13th century compared to the situation in the 14th and 15th centuries or later.

== Background ==
Stećci are found in territories ruled by the Bosnian medieval state throughout the Middle Ages, which today corresponds with a territory that cover most of Bosnia and Herzegovina, and a borderlands of Serbia, Croatia and Montenegro.

In terms of aesthetics and size, elaborate artistic processing and ornamentation, and a sheer variety of present forms, one of the most representative and the best-preserved collection of stećaks is Radimlja necropolis, west of Stolac, while the Zgošća Stećak, from the vicinity of Kakanj, is one of the most representative individual examples of stećak found.

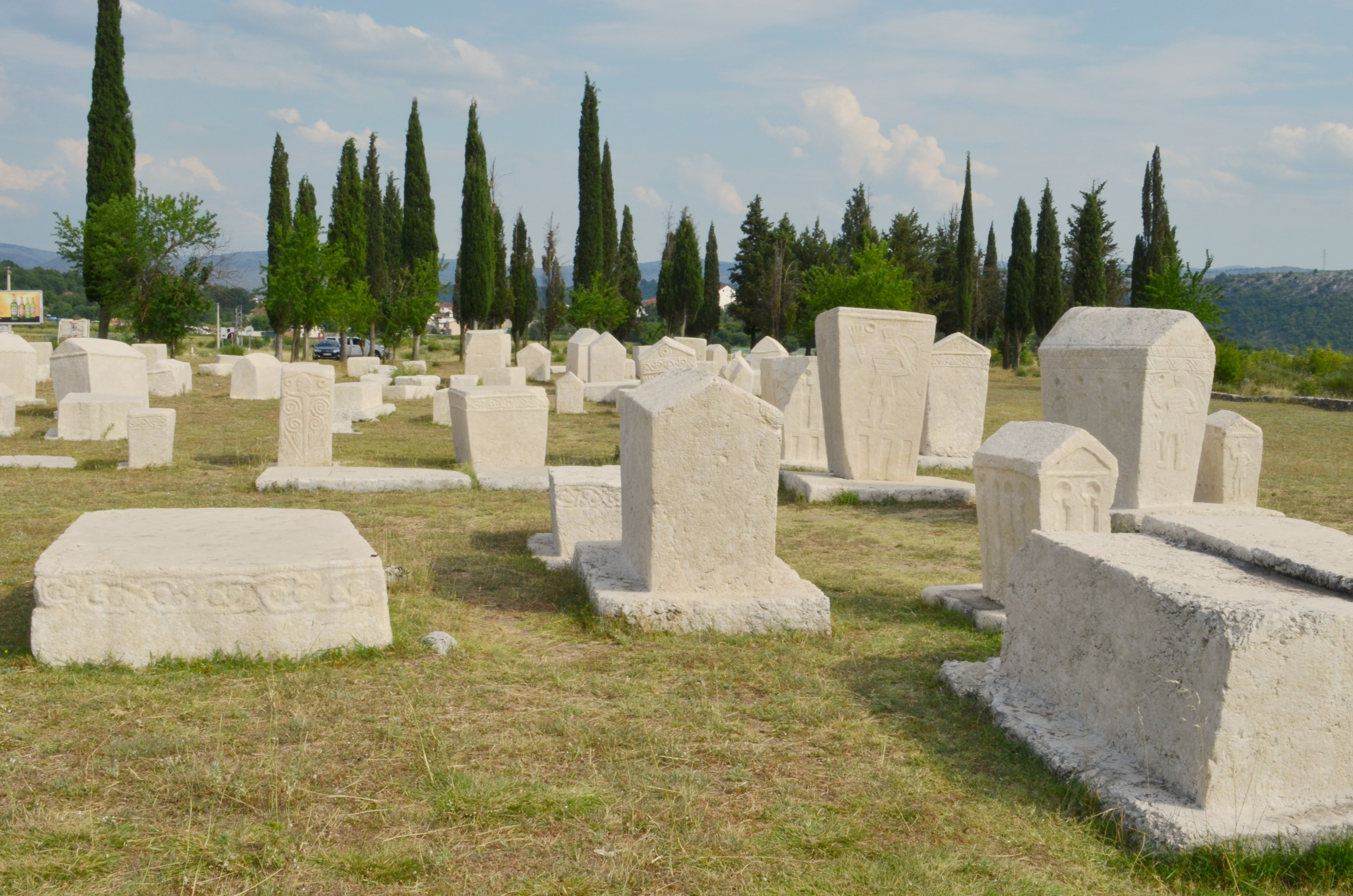
Radimlja necropolis near Stolac

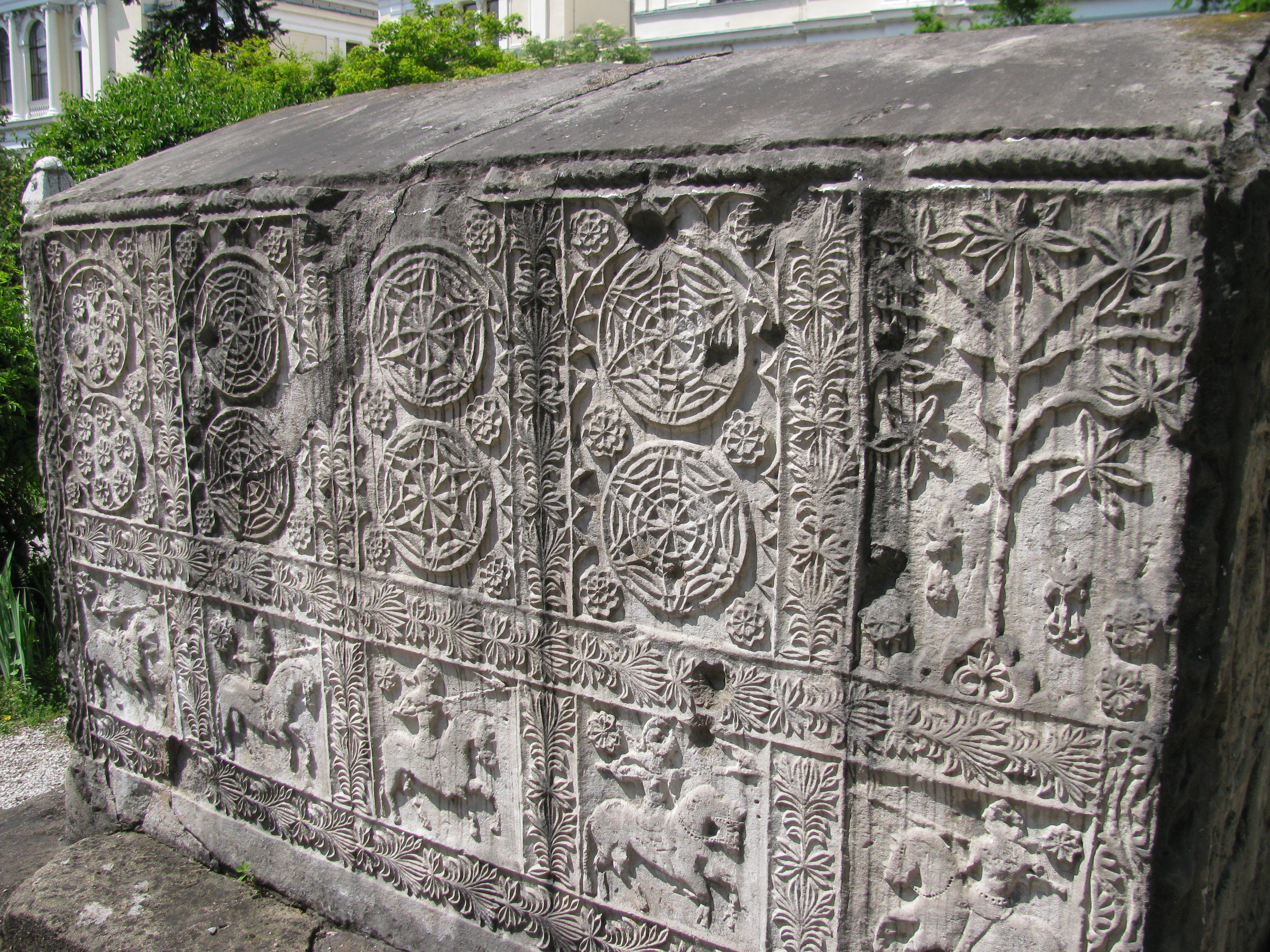
Richly decorated Zgoća stećak

== Lying horizontal stećaks ==
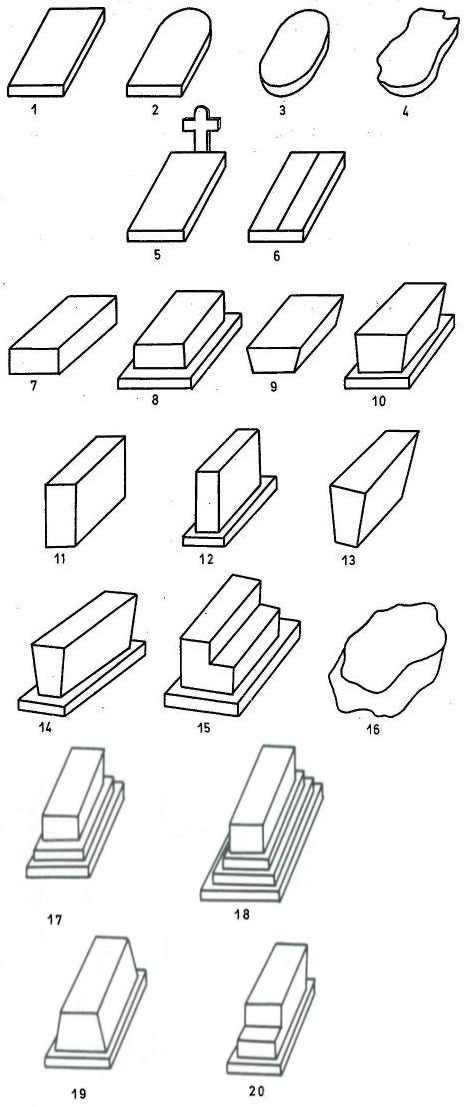
Stecak forms - basic slabs, chests, pedestals

=== Slabs ===
The oldest examples of horizontal thick slab (a ledger form) stećaks found in the surroundings of Trebinje date from the 12th and 13th centuries. It is assumed that the oldest stećci in the form of slabs were created following the earlier custom of carving and placing slabs in and around churches in Bosnia and other countries. Slabs are the simplest and most widespread form of stećak. It represents a common form that was carved and installed in territories ruled by the Bosnian medieval state, territories that include today's Bosnia and Herzegovina, Serbia, Croatia and Montenegro. It is in the form of a four-sided lying prism, up to 30 cm high, from 150 to 200 cm long and from 70 to 100 cm wide. There are very large slabs, which sometimes reach a length of more than 300 cm and a width of more than 200 cm, as well as very small slabs, which belong to buried children. A slab with one incised or plastic line in the middle along its length represents the tombstones for two buried persons. Sometimes they are together with a cross and form one tombstone. In the 13th century, the population of medieval Bosnia and Hum lived in difficult and unsettled political and economic conditions, while they fiercely defended themselves from Hungarian pretensions to their country. These circumstances had to be reflected in the culture, including sepulchral culture of producing more elaborate stećaks. This can to some extent explain the certain poverty of the shape, carving and decorations, including inscriptions of the stećak compared to the later situation in the 14th and 15th centuries. Although there is no more reliable evidence for this conclusion, it can be said that the appearance of a larger number of simple slabs, rather than more elaborate chests and gables, as stećaks in the 13th century, is one of the symptoms of the mentioned circumstances. In the entire territory of distribution, they take about 24% of the total number of stećaks in general.

=== Chest ===
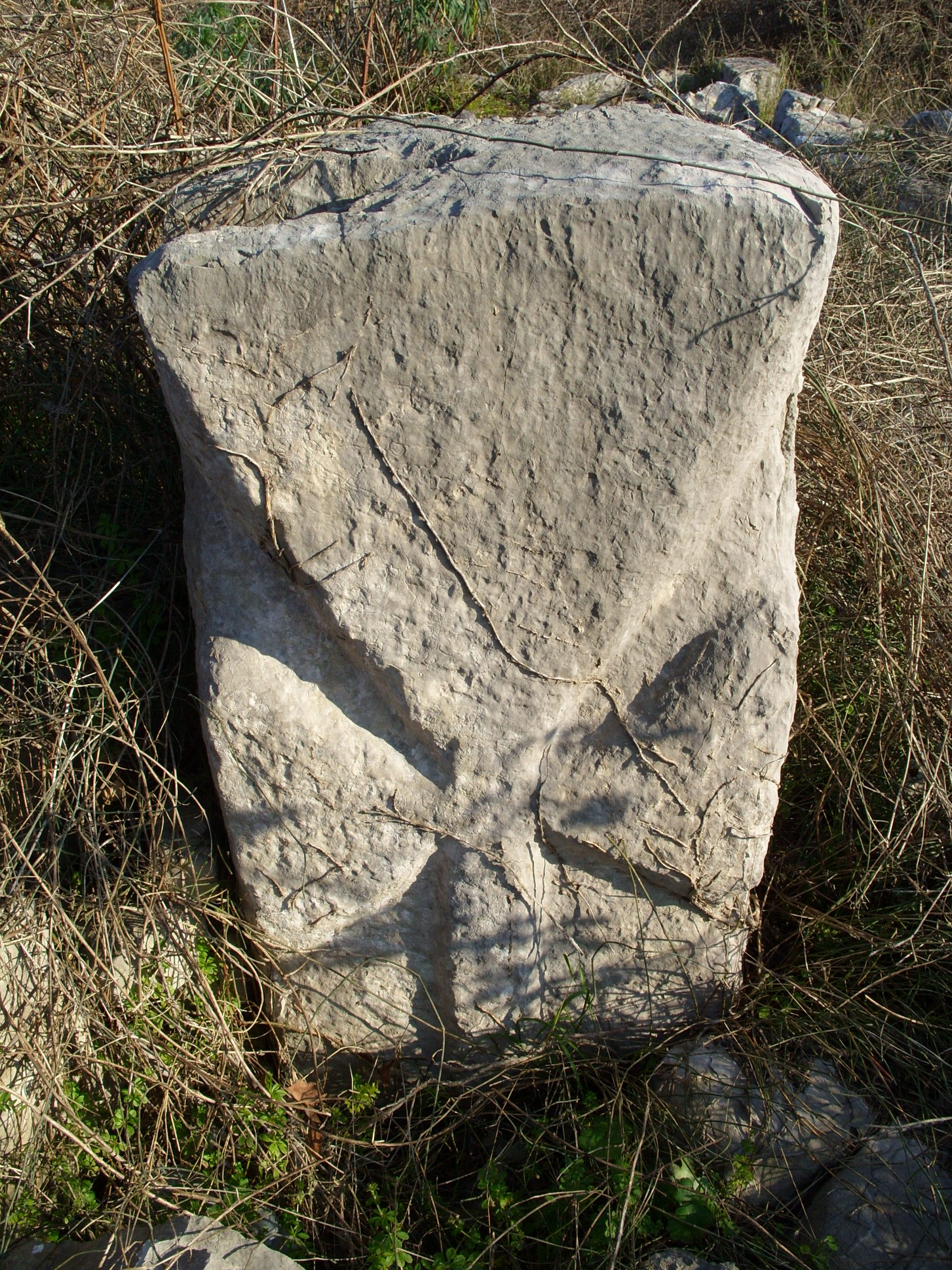
Stećaks are cut in many different ways, however still upon well-defined basic forms

Stećaks in the form of chests are to some extent a higher stage of development and transformation of stećaks in the form of slabs. At the same time, they are a sign and result of settled and more stable social relations, and political and economic situations. This is why they appeared in greater numbers in the 14th century. Gradually, they become bigger, with slab pedestals, elaborately decorated and with epitaphs. Chest-shaped stećaks are of different sizes. They are most often 150 to 200 cm long, 70 to 100 cm wide, and 40 to 80 cm high, but there are also very large and very small ones. The stećak from Vlađevina near Rogatica weighs 25 tons, while the stećak of Pavle Radinović from Pavlovac near Lukavica has a volume of 11.40 m3 and weighs staggering 31 tons and 920 kg. Two huge stećaks are also located in Lužine near Fojnica, which is recently moved to the park next to the Reumal hotel Some with great height, over 200 cm, are called tall chests. Sometimes the chest has some sort of step on one of its sides. There are also double chests, that is, stećaks for two buried persons. They can be recognized by the longitudinal ribbon in the middle of the monument, by the middle of the rectangular upper base, or by the fact that one half of the stećak is higher and the other. Including examples with pedestals, chests make about 64% of the total number of all stećaks.

=== Chest with slab pedestal ===
Chests with slab pedestal are actually made in two forms. One form is chest with a pedestal slab, which is cut together with a chest of the one and the same stone – also called homogeneous, and the other form is chest on a pedestal slab, which is cut separately of a separate piece of stone, so it can be said that this variety consists of two parts. There are also chests with two and even three stands, which look very imposing. Just like an ordinary chest, there is also a variant of a double stećaks, when, for example, it has a middle one on the upper rectangular base, or when it is carved so that one half is higher and the other lower. No combinations with crosses have been found, and there are also no amorphous variants. Also, this shape, like an ordinary chest, has its own different sizes. Along with ordinary chests, this form is by far the most numerous, especially in the eastern parts of Bosnia and Herzegovina, and as previously emphasized, they make up about 64% of the total number of stećaks in general.

=== Gable-shaped (sarcophagus) ===
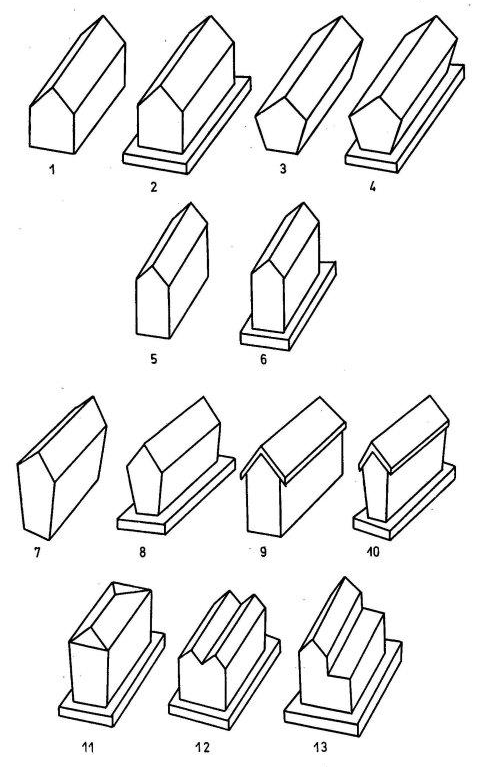
Stecak forms -basic- gables

Gable-shaped or sarcophagus stećak is a chest where the upper side is no longer horizontal but resembles a gabled house-roof. The name sarcophagus is also because at first glance it is similar to the Roman sarcophagus. Sometimes the top surfaces of the gables are slightly protruding, and sometimes slightly hollowed out. The top is sometimes high and steep, and sometimes low. There are several varieties of gable stećaks with four different varieties of top surfaces. In a significant number of examples, the top surface somewhat exceeds the vertical surfaces of the monument, so that viewer experience a top with eaves and gutters. The size of the gables is very different, especially their height. In Herzegovina they are very high, while in central and northeastern Bosnia, in Podrinje, for its low ridges. As with chests, many gables are beveled towards the bottom. Also, with this form of stećak, there are doubles. Several examples of doubles were also found consisting of two equal joined – homogeneous – gables. Gable-shaped stećak can be said to be more carefully and more elaborately carved than the others. It makes about 9% of the total number of stećaks in general.

=== Gable-shaped with slab pedestal ===
Most of these stećaks have their own pedestals, which are sometimes carved from the same piece of stone – also called homogeneous, while sometimes they are made from a different piece of stone and represent another, separate, part of the stećak. Due to the fact that gables are often large and heavy, these stećaks have a more stable position on the ground. Sometimes they have two or three stands. And this form has several subvarieties. Thus, its top surface can be two, three, as well as four in length. Those top surfaces are sometimes slightly protruding or slightly hollowed out. Also, there are so-called double gables with (slab) pedestals, as well as those that are combined with chests. Not a single example of combining gables with a cross was found, and there are no amorphous gables with pedestals either. In medieval times they were highly valued and required the hiring of skilled stonemasons. It comes in various sizes. One of the largest is Pavle's stećak, located in Pavlovac near Lukavica, just outside of Sarajevo, which weighs nearly 32 tons. This form occupies about 9% of the total number of stećaks.

== Standing upright stećaks ==
=== Column ===
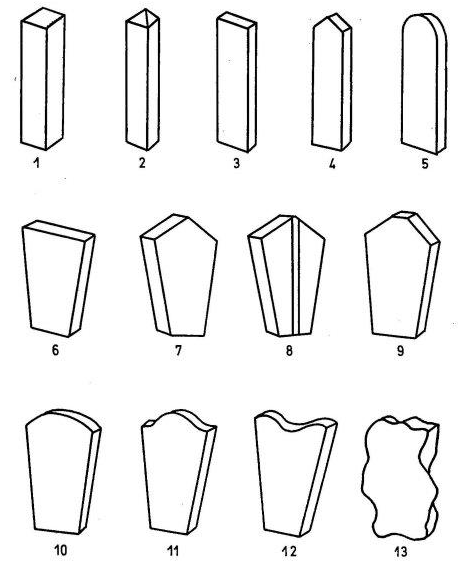
Stecak forms -basic- columns

Standing stećaks are mostly cut in the form of columns. This form is very similar to the oldest Muslim nišans without turbans, on which appearance stećaks in the form of columns had a certain influence during stećak to nišan transition period. Columns are nothing more than upright slabs or upright chests. In order for them to stand firmly, they had to be partially buried or dug in, or in local tongue "usaditi" (transl. "planted" – transl. "rooted"), into the ground which is why they are most often called "usađenik". Thus, some columns end with a flat top surface, some as a roof with two or three sides. There are columns that end in a protruding, rounded, barrel-shaped way, as well as those that are arched in that part, lying down. Quite a number of upright slabs are carved so that they gradually widen from the bottom upwards. And such surfaces have very different finishes. Quite rare examples of columns that look like upright gables have also been found. Amorphous or loosely carved upright stećaks similar to columns have been recorded. The number of columns is about 4% of the total stećak. The fact that the columns are mostly studded in Serbia and eastern Bosnia, and that there are few of them in central Bosnia, and that in western Bosnia, Herzegovina, Montenegro and Croatia they are a very rare or almost completely exceptional phenomenon, clearly shows where this influence, due to the Turkish-Ottoman presence, first reflected. Stećci columns are considered to be a phenomenon of the second half of the 15th and the entire 16th century.

=== Cross-shaped ===
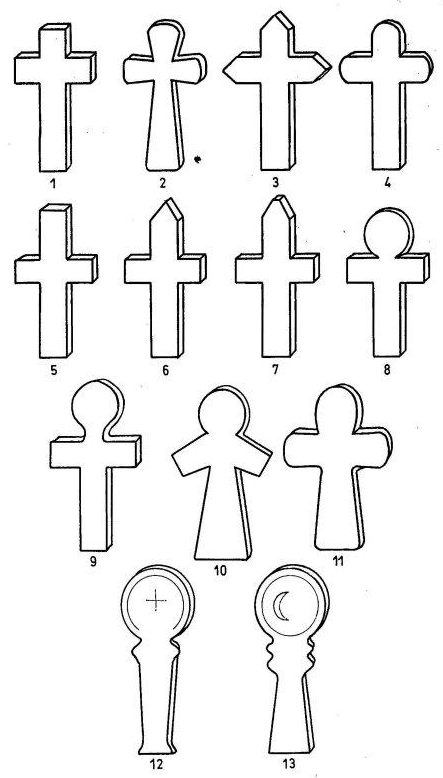
Stecak forms -basic- cross-columns, transitioning to a Muslim nišans

This form of stećak is generally not represented, and it amounts to about 0.5% of the total number of stećaks. There are relatively many in Herzegovina, and the least in Montenegro and Serbia. It was noticed that the cross are most often located on the periphery of the necropolis. They are considered to originate from the end of the stećak period, mostly from the 16th century, as a counterpart to the appearance of Muslim nišans. It is a typical Christian tombstone. They are also of different sizes. Sometimes they are very tall, sometimes they reach a height of over 3 m. They are carved so that their upper three arms are of equal dimensions. The lower vertical arm is always longer than the transverse arms. In many cases, the transverse arms gradually widen towards the ends, and there are also those whose transverse arms are pointed or rounded. Great attention was paid to the creation of the upper upright arm, so that it sometimes ends with a flat surface, sometimes like a pyramid, or is barrel-vaulted, many times it is made round, in the form of a human head, and there are other variants. In the vicinity of Travnik and Zenica, quite a number of stećaks have been recorded, in which the transverse arms are small and barely indicated, and the upper upright is relatively large and round. There are also those whose transverse arms are slightly bent, so they resemble the shoulders of a man. Also, here we have some subtypes of this monument, and thus a certain number of crosses were found, which together with the associated slab or chest make up one monument.

=== Amorphous ===
In some necropolises, along with stećci of basic lying and standing forms, there are also stećaks that are not carved at all or are only superficially cut. Many examples of these unprocessed tombstones resemble stećaks in the form of slabs or chests, and their dimensions are close to those forms. There is a considerable number of amorphous stećaks that most resemble columns, as the basic forms of standing stećak.

== Territorial distribution of forms ==
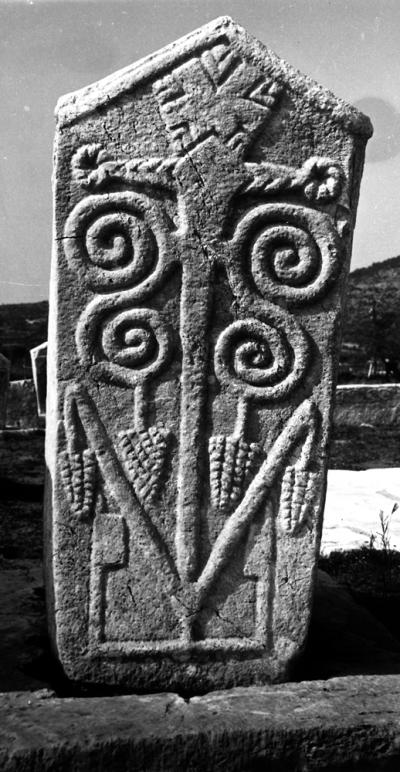
Decorations on stećak

In the middle of the 20th century, records were made of territorial distribution and forms.

The following table shows distribution of main forms per country:

Territory	Slab	Chest	Gable	Column	Cross	Amorphous	Total
Bosnia and Herzegovina	12734	37312	5437	2466	305	293	58547
Croatia	1511		147	3	9	0	3253
Serbia	843	338	196	131	6	361	1875
Montenegro	455	1975	93	26	4	250	2803
TOTAL	15543	41208	5873	2626	324	904	66478

== Decorations ==
Some basic decorative reliefs found on stećaks.

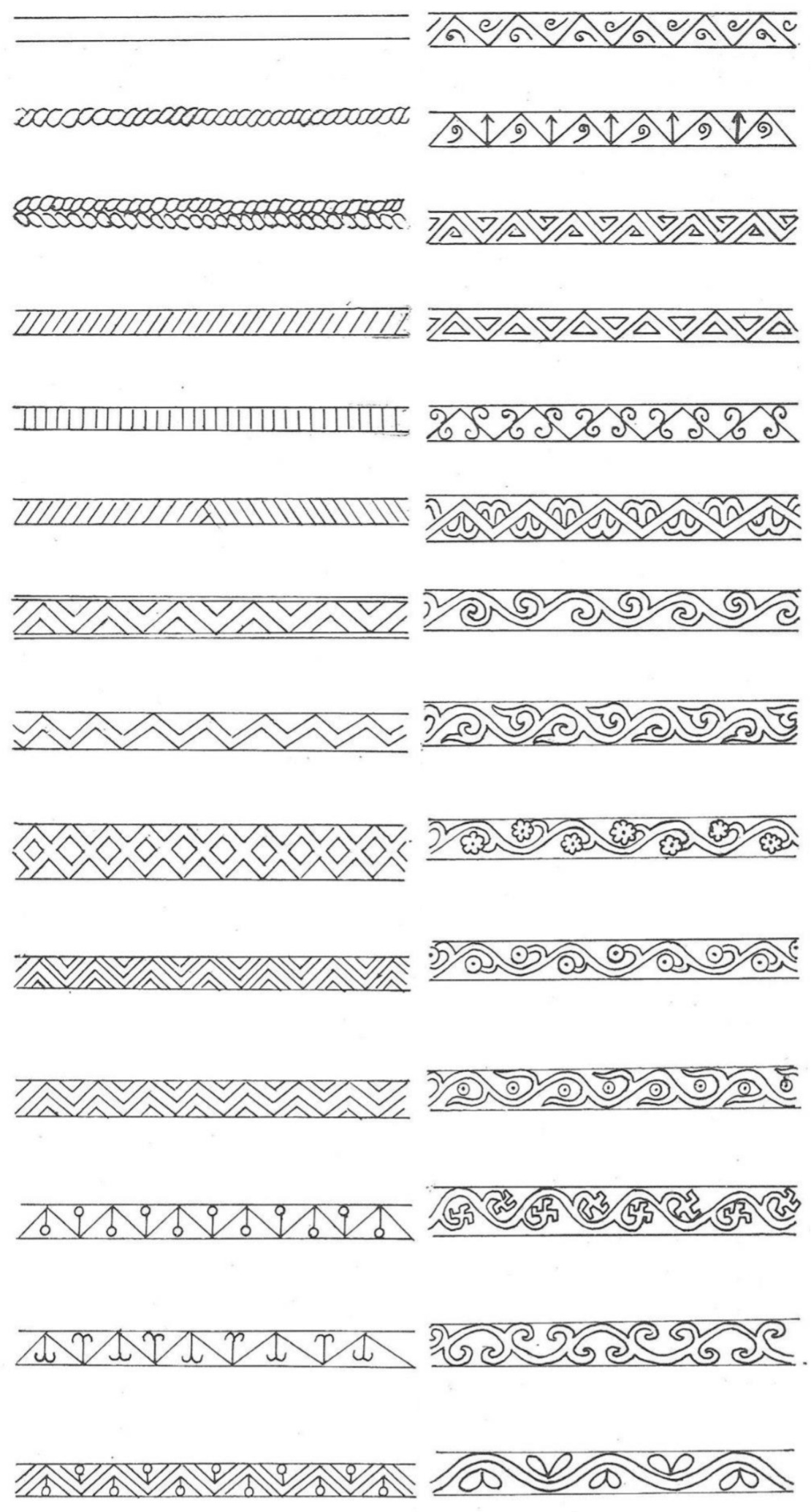

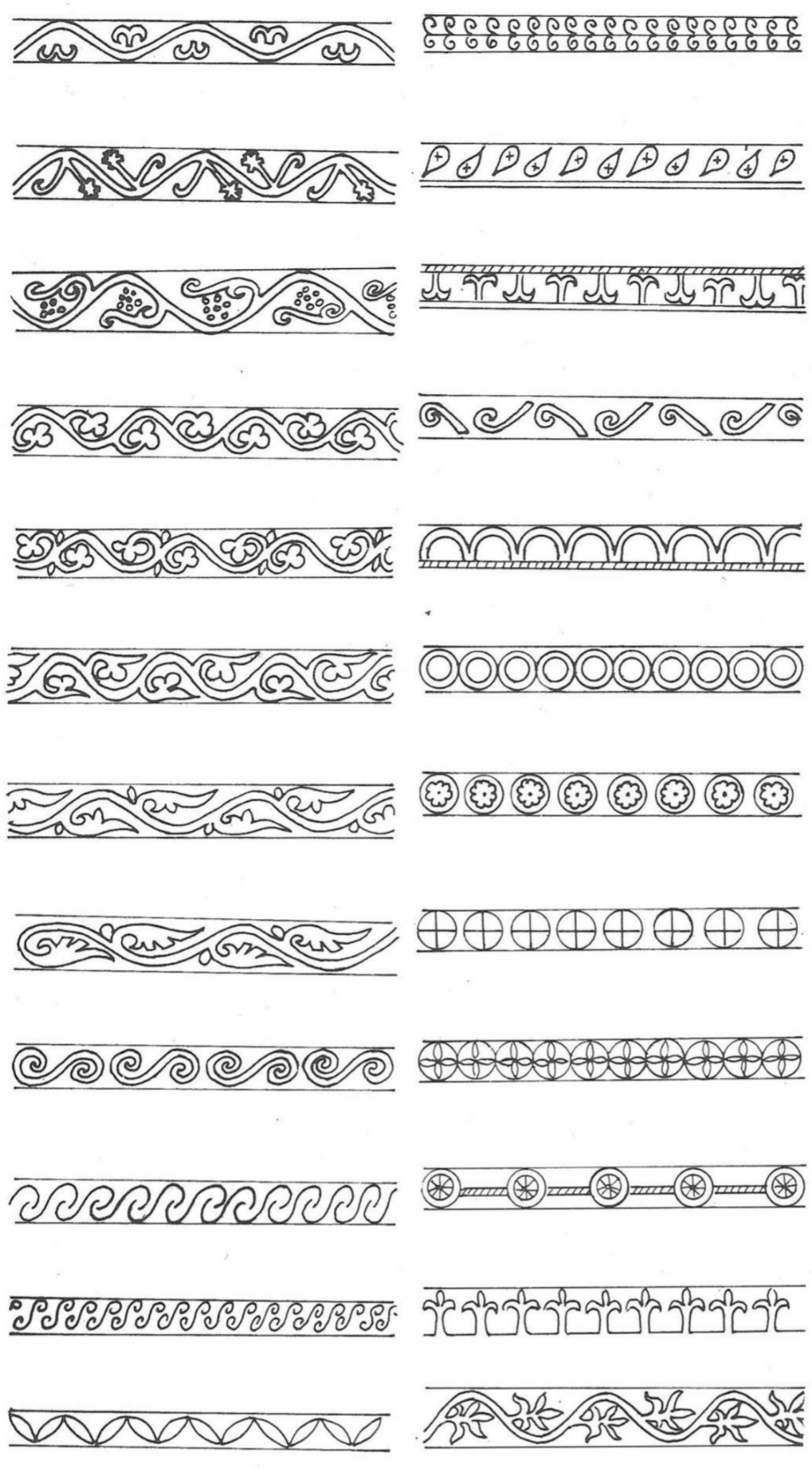

Radimlja necropolis is one of the finest examples of stećaks and it's included into a group of 28 selected necropolises now on the UNESCO's World Heritage List. Nearly half, or sixty three (63), were decorated in bas relief, engraving or a combination. The finest decorated examples are tall chests with pedestal and sarcophagus with pedestal, used to mark a grave of the social elite.

Ornaments include curved lines with trefoil, plastic zigzag, radial circle, rosette, depiction of plastic circles, cluster, rod shaped as letter T, spiral curves. The depiction of arrow and bow on voivode (ducal) stećci was related to military function.

Figural depictions can be divided to those of male figures with raised right hand, or stećci that symbolize Vitus and scenes of hunting, posthumous kolo and chivalric tournaments, with basic artistic and religious interweaving of pagan and Christian ideas.

The inscriptions mention deceased person(s), their family and other inhabitants related to person(s), are sometimes present.
