= Mihajlo Miloradović =

Russian colonel

Kavalier Mihajlo Miloradović
- Print of a Russian Trebnik (Orthodox "book of needs") with notes by Mihajlo and Gavrilo Miloradović.
- Born: Second half of 17th century
- Died: 1727; Imperial Russia
- Military career
- Allegiance: Russian Empire
- Branch: Army
- Service years: fl. 1707–1725
- Rank: polkovnik (colonel)
- Wars: Russo-Turkish War (1710–1713)

Mihajlo Miloradović (Serbian: Михајло Милорадовић; fl. 1707–d. 1727) was an Imperial Russian colonel (polkovnik) and envoy that initiated an uprising in Montenegro against the Ottoman Empire in 1711, orchestrated by Russian diplomat Sava Vladislavich.

== Life ==
Ilija Miloradović with his two sons Mihajlo and Gavrilo migrated to the Russian Empire at the end of the 17th century. According to G. Miloradovich (1871), Mihajlo was "born in Serbia" (Russian: родился въ Сербіи). The family, belonging to the Miloradović-Hrabren brotherhood, hailed from the Ottoman Sanjak of Herzegovina, where members had earlier served the Ottomans as Christian Timar-holding sipahi (professional cavalrymen). The brotherhood had founded the Serbian Orthodox monastery of Žitomislić in the second half of the 16th century.

Mihajlo's brother Gavrilo worked as a Ragusan merchant. In 1707, the two brothers visited Žitomislić and donated nine Russian church books gifted by Russian emperor Peter the Great (r. 1682–1725).

In a 1711 letter of Russian statesman Golovkin, Mihajlo Miloradović is called on duty in Little Russia.

In 1711, during the Russo-Turkish War (1710–1713), Mihajlo was sent by the Russian command as "a Serb colonel" (polkovnik) to Cetinje in Montenegro, where he and Cetinje metropolitan Danilo (t. 1696–1735) declared an uprising on the Ottoman Empire on St. Vitus' Day (Vidovdan, 28 June). Mihajlo and captain Lukačević, both of Serb ancestry, were sent as Russian envoys to rally the Montenegrin, Brda and Herzegovinian tribes. The Bosnian Eyalet army served against Russia in 1711, and this led to even more anarchy in the region, struck by internal problems. The uprising was initiated by Russian graf Sava Vladislavich, who managed to persuade emperor Peter to aid in the liberation struggle among Serbs in Herzegovina and Montenegro. Mihajlo's reputation is clear from the fact that Vladislavich and emperor Peter entrusted this mission to him. Miloradović unloaded armament in Grbalj in early July 1711, and the emperor's charter was then read up among the tribes, and by the second half of July the rebels counted c. 6,000 men.

The rebels had initial losses against Ottoman fortress crews which dispirited the commoners, and the struggle continued with clashes between Orthodox and Muslim civilians in the Sanjak of Bosnia. Following the losses, the rebellion died out when the Porte ordered for the neighbouring sanjaks to muster armies against Montenegro after which emperor Peter signed peace at Prut (23 July 1711). The rebels were defeated with many losses at Onogošt (now Nikšić) and Mihajlo was forced to retreat. Mihajlo stayed for a short while in Cetinje and Ragusa, until he left for Russia in 1712. While at Cetinje in 1712, he encouraged the Montenegrins by calling on Ivan Crnojević, the "last of the [medieval] Serb lords" to oppose the Ottoman Turks. That same year, the serasker Sari Ahmed Pasha led Ottoman Bosnian troops, with the aid of Tahir Pasha Mahmud Bey-zade, that marched on Cetinje, burnt down the monastery, and received submission from the Montenegrin chieftains.

In 1714, Mihajlo, back at Moscow, began on the compilation of a Carostavnik (Serbian chronicle) with the help of Nikola Vlastelinović; the compilation included transcriptions from the chronicle of Trebinje archimandrite Janićije.

Miloradović died in 1727.

== Legacy ==
Montenegrin metropolitan Petar I Petrović-Njegoš (t. 1784–1830) dedicated a poem to Mihajlo and his 1711 mission. The Russian Trebnik ("book of needs"), one of the nine books donated in 1707, has notes written by Mihajlo and his brother Gavrilo (included in the article) and the work has survived. In 1871, Grigoriy Miloradovich wrote a book on the Russian noble family of Miloradovich, which included a biography on Mihajlo Miloradović.

== See also ==
- Serbs in Russia

== Annotations ==
1. Kojić (1983) used Mihajlo Miloradović (Михајло Милорадовић); Đerić (1900) and Samardžić (1986) used Mihailo Miloradović (Михаило Милорадовић). G. Miloradovich (1871) used Mikhail Ilich Miloradovich (Russian: Милорадовичъ).

== Sources ==
- Đerić, Vasilije (1900). O srpskom imenu po zapadnijem krajevima našega naroda. Državna štamparija Kraljevine Srbije. p. 5.
- Dučić, Jovan (1982) [1942]. Jedan Srbin diplomata na dvoru Petra Velikog i Katarine I, grof Sava Vladislavić. Slovo ljubve.
- Kojić, Ljubinka (1983). "Историја". Манастир Житомислић [Žitomislić Monastery]. Veselin Masleša.
- Miloradovich, Grigory O. (1871). О родѣ дворян и графа Милорадович (in Russian). Tipografïja M.P. Frica.
- Samardžić, Radovan (1986). "Срби у Турском царству 1699-1716". Историја српског народа IV: Срби у XVIII веку. Српска књижевна задруга.
