= Udrežnje =

Udrežnje Удрежње
- Village
- Location within Bosnia and Herzegovina
- Coordinates: 43°12′28″N 18°05′20″E
- Country: Bosnia and Herzegovina
- Entity: Republika Srpska
- Municipality: Nevesinje
- Time zone: UTC+1 (CET)
  - Summer (DST): UTC+2 (CEST)

Udrežnje (Serbian Cyrillic: Удрежње) is a village in the municipality of Nevesinje, Republika Srpska, Bosnia and Herzegovina.

According to the 2013 census, there are 189 inhabitants.

On June 2, 1941, Franjo Sudar's Ustaše attacked the Udrežnje village and killed 27 people of the Vujadinović, Vukosav, Dragović, Gambelić, Kljakić, Šipovac, Šakota and Škipina families.
