= Vladimir Krulj =

French and Serbian economist

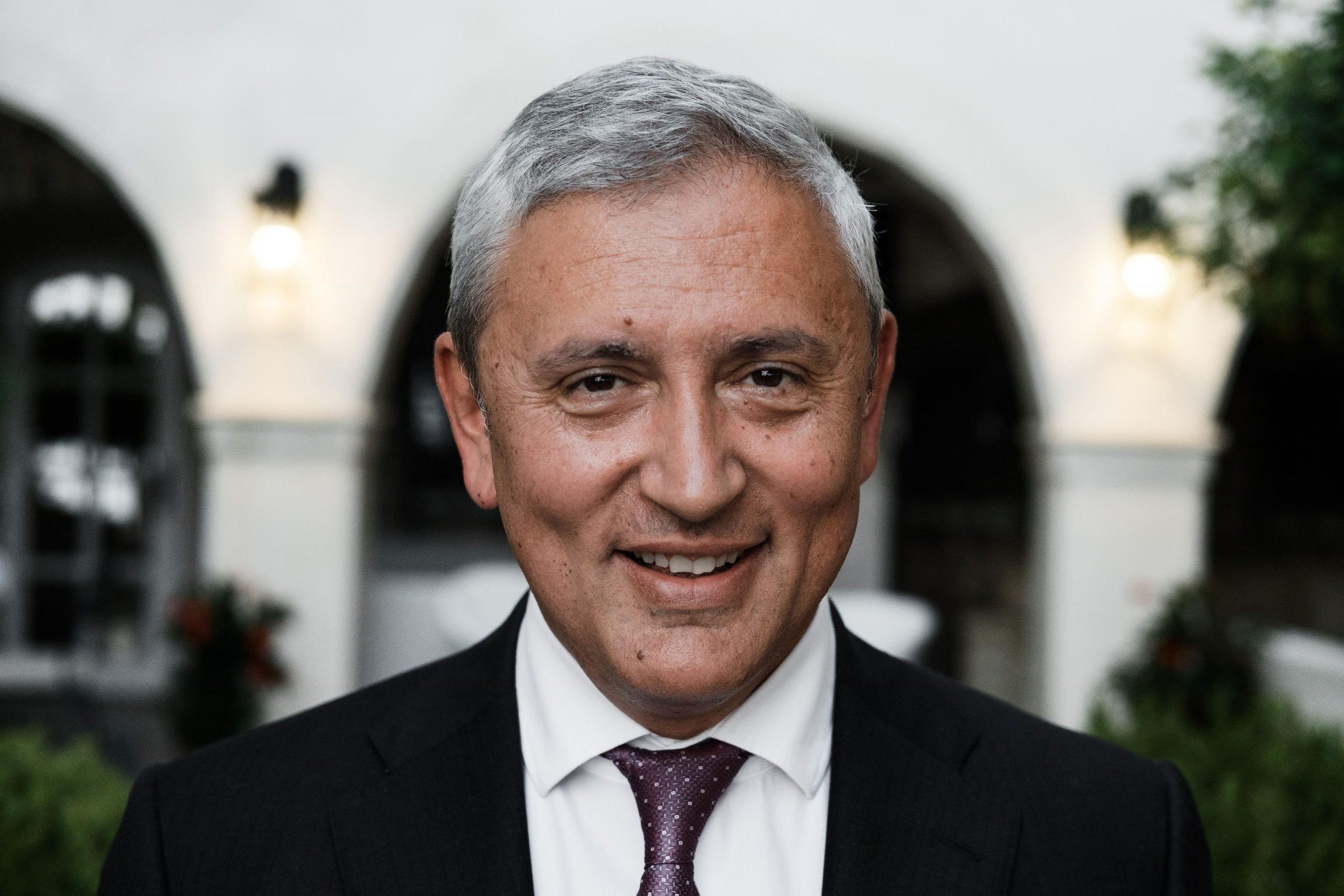
Vladimir Krulj, Serbian economist.

Vladimir Krulj is a French and Serbian economist, fellow at the free-market think tank Institute of Economic Affairs in London. Krulj was the President of the Board of Komercijalna banka, chief economist to the Serbian core negotiating team with the EU, and advisor to the cabinet of the Minister without portfolio in charge of European integration.

== Biography ==
Krulj holds an MA degree from Coventry University and a professional certificate from the École nationale d'administration. He obtained an executive master from HEC Paris. Krulj also earned a PhD from the Faculty of Economics Finance and Administration at Singidunum University and completed post-doctorate research at the Louvain Catholic University.

Krulj served in advisory roles to the Government of Serbia. From 2016 to 2018 Krulj was President of the Board of Komercijalna Banka. Krulj is a macroeconomic analyst and a columnist of printed and electronic media in Serbia and abroad.
