= Odžaci, Konjic =

Village in Bosnia and Herzegovina

Odžaci
- Village
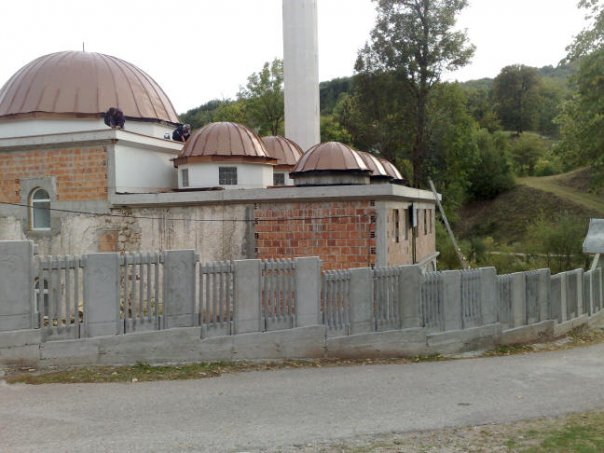

- Location within Bosnia and Herzegovina
- Country: Bosnia and Herzegovina
- Entity: Federation of Bosnia and Herzegovina
- Canton: Herzegovina-Neretva
- Municipality: Konjic

Area
  - Total: 2.81 sq mi (7.29 km^{2})

Population (2013)
  - Total: 70
  - Density: 25/sq mi (9.6/km^{2})
- Time zone: UTC+1 (CET)
  - Summer (DST): UTC+2 (CEST)

Odžaci is a village in the municipality of Konjic, Bosnia and Herzegovina.

== Demographics ==
According to the 2013 census, its population was 70.

Ethnicity in 2013
Ethnicity	Number	Percentage
Bosniaks	69	98.6%
other/undeclared	1	1.4%
Total	70	100%
