= Krulj =

Origin
- Language: Serbo-Croatian

Other names
- Variant form: Kruljac

Krulj (Serbian Cyrillic: Круљ) is a Serbian surname.

== History ==
On June 26/27, 1941, during World War II in Yugoslavia, the Ustaše expelled a number of Serbs named Krulj from the villages of Trijebanj and Kozice in Herzegovina. At least 45 individuals with the surname died at the Jasenovac concentration camp.

== People ==
Notable people with the name include:

- Bojan Krulj, Serbian footballer
- Igor Krulj, Swedish footballer
- Nikola Krulj, Serbian Orthodox Metropolitan of Dabar-Bosna
- Vladimir Krulj, French and Serbian economist
- Uroš Krulj, Ban of Zeta (1931–1932)
