= Ošanjići =

- Village
- Location within Bosnia and Herzegovina
- Coordinates: 43.0964162°N 17.9292059°E
- Country: Bosnia and Herzegovina
- Entity: Federation of Bosnia and Herzegovina
- Canton: Herzegovina-Neretva
- Municipality: Stolac

Area
  - Total: 3.11 sq mi (8.06 km^{2})

Population (2013)
  - Total: 1,004
  - Density: 323/sq mi (125/km^{2})
- Time zone: UTC+1 (CET)
  - Summer (DST): UTC+2 (CEST)

Ošanjići is a village in the municipality of Stolac, Bosnia and Herzegovina.

== Demographics ==
According to the 2013 census, its population was 1,004.

Ethnicity in 2013
Ethnicity	Number	Percentage
Bosniaks	749	74.6%
Croats	218	21.7%
Serbs	11	1.1%
other/undeclared	26	2.6%
Total	1,004	100%
