= Žitomislići =

- Village
- Location within Bosnia and Herzegovina
- Coordinates: 43.1956847°N 17.768261°E
- Country: Bosnia and Herzegovina
- Entity: Federation of Bosnia and Herzegovina
- Canton: Herzegovina-Neretva
- Municipality: City of Mostar

Area
  - Total: 2.44 sq mi (6.33 km^{2})

Population (2013)
  - Total: 877
  - Density: 359/sq mi (139/km^{2})
- Time zone: UTC+1 (CET)
  - Summer (DST): UTC+2 (CEST)

Žitomislići is a village in the City of Mostar, Bosnia and Herzegovina.

== Demographics ==
According to the 2013 census, its population was 877.

Ethnicity in 2013
Ethnicity	Number	Percentage
Croats	760	86.7%
Serbs	114	13.0%
Bosniaks	1	0.1%
other/undeclared	2	0.2%
Total	877	100%
