= Stolac =

Stolac Столац
- City
- Grad Stolac; Град Столац; City of Stolac
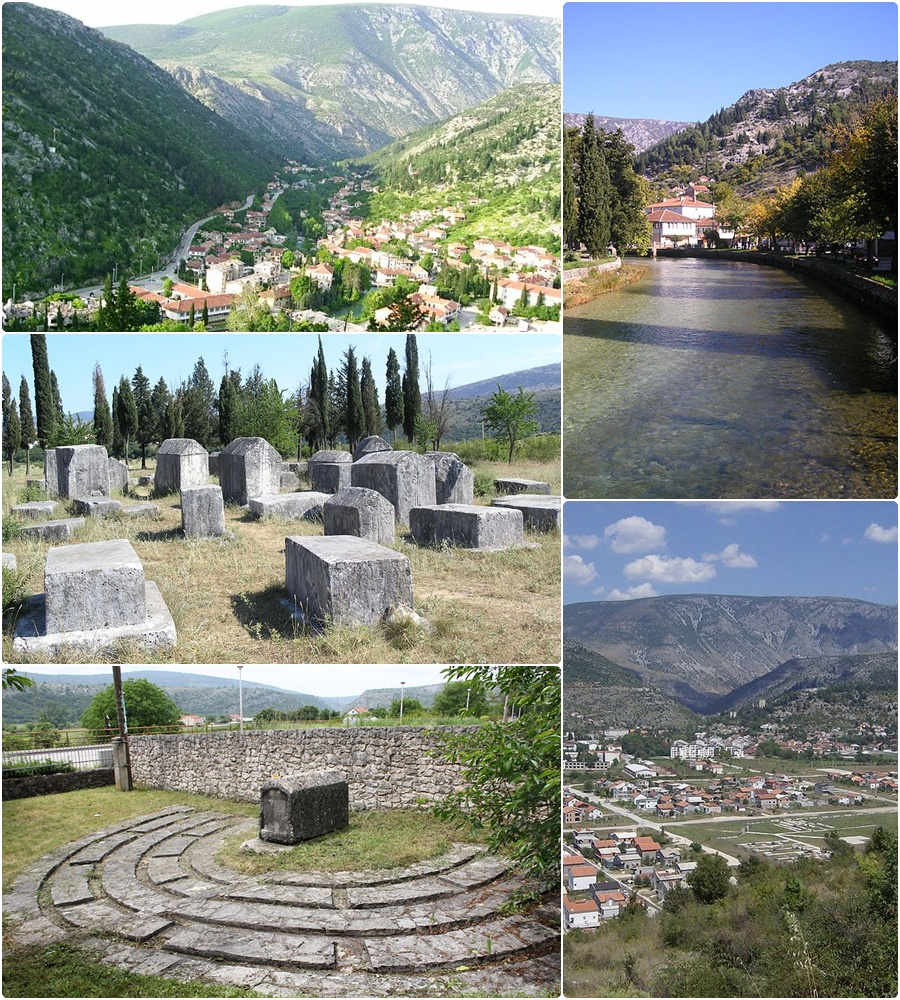
- Stolac

- Flag Seal
- Nickname: Daorson
- Location of Stolac within Bosnia and Herzegovina.
- Country: Bosnia and Herzegovina
- Entity: Federation of Bosnia and Herzegovina
- Canton: Herzegovina-Neretva
- Geographical region: Herzegovina
- Established: 9th century BC

Government
  - Mayor: Stjepan Bošković (HDZ BiH)

Area
  - City: 331 km^{2} (128 sq mi)

Population (2013 census)
  - City: 14,889
  - Density: 45/km^{2} (120/sq mi)
  - Urban: 3,816
- Time zone: UTC+1 (CET)
  - Summer (DST): UTC+2 (CEST)
- Area code: +387 36
- Website: www.stolac.gov.ba

Stolac (Serbian Cyrillic: Столац) is an ancient city located in Herzegovina-Neretva Canton of the Federation of Bosnia and Herzegovina, an entity of Bosnia and Herzegovina. It is located in the region of Herzegovina. Stolac is one of the oldest cities in Bosnia and Herzegovina as well as one of the oldest continuously inhabited cities in the World.

Stolac is situated in the area known as Herzegovina Humina on the tourist route crossing Herzegovina and linking the Bosnian mountainous hinterland with the coastal regions of Bosnia and Herzegovina, Dubrovnik, and Montenegro. The road, running from Sarajevo via Mostar, Stolac, Ljubinje, and Trebinje, enables one to reach Dubrovnik in less than 4 hours.

Stolac and its area have been settled since antiquity due to the town's natural environment, geological composition, contours, climate, hydrographic and vegetation. Its rich hunting-grounds along with other natural benefits attracted prehistoric man, and later the Illyrians, Romans and Slavs, all of whom left a wealth of anthropological evidence.

In 2022, a new modern road of 36 km that connected the heart of Herzegovina with the sea, Stolac with Neum, was completed with support and funding from the World Bank. The road helped the development of tourism between Neum, Stolac and Mostar.

== History ==
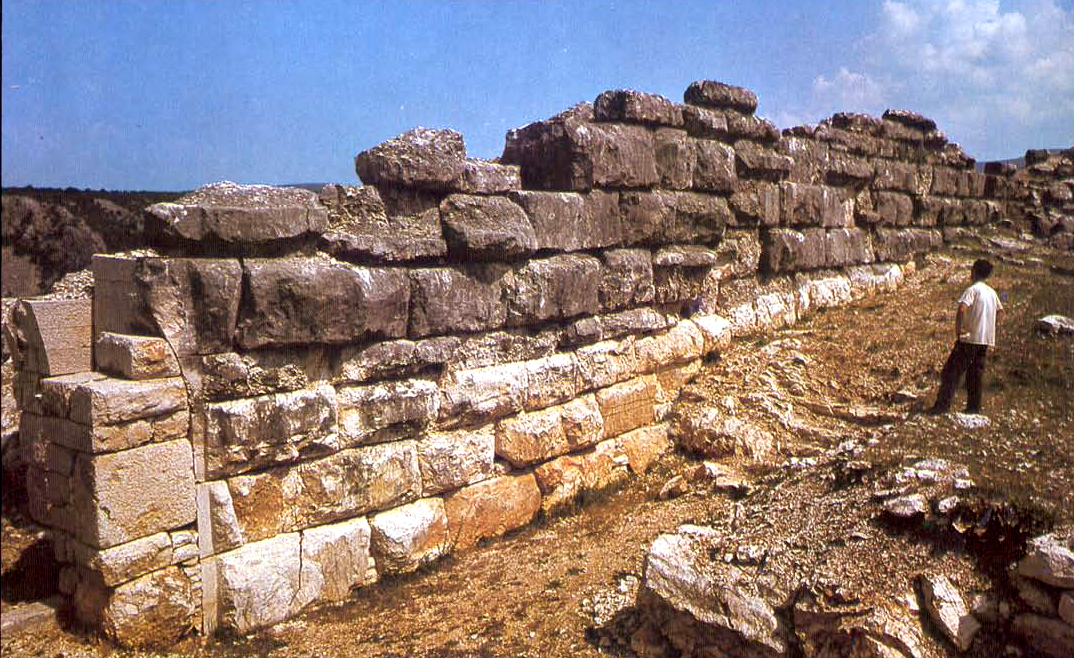
Walls of ancient Daorson, located at Ošanjići near Stolac.

The area has been settled for at least 15,000 years, as evidenced by the markings in Badanj Cave, which experts have dated 12,000–16,000 BCE. Three kilometres west of Stolac is the Radimlja stećak necropolis, dating back to the 15th and 16th centuries, the mainstream belief says that Daorson is 2500 years old, but some geological studies confirm that the ruins below the site date back 7000 years.

These stećak tombstones are carved with epitaphs, detailed portraits of the deceased, and motifs such as grapevines, hunting scenes and wild animals. Five of the Radimlja tombstones are thought to mark the graves of members of the Hrabren Miloradović Vlach family.

== Architecture ==
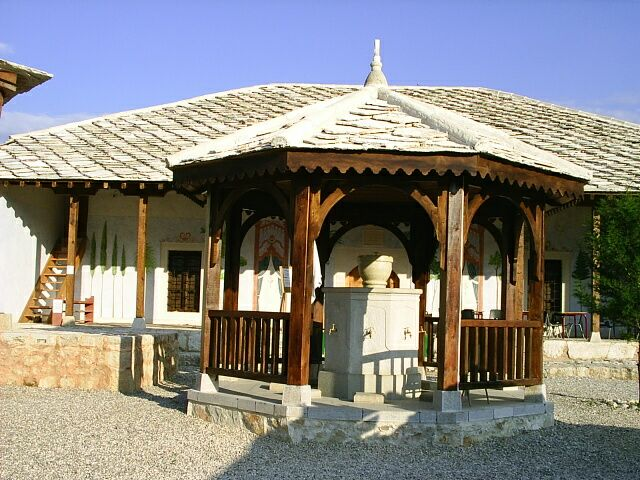
Šadrvan (water fountain) for performing Muslim ritual ablutions

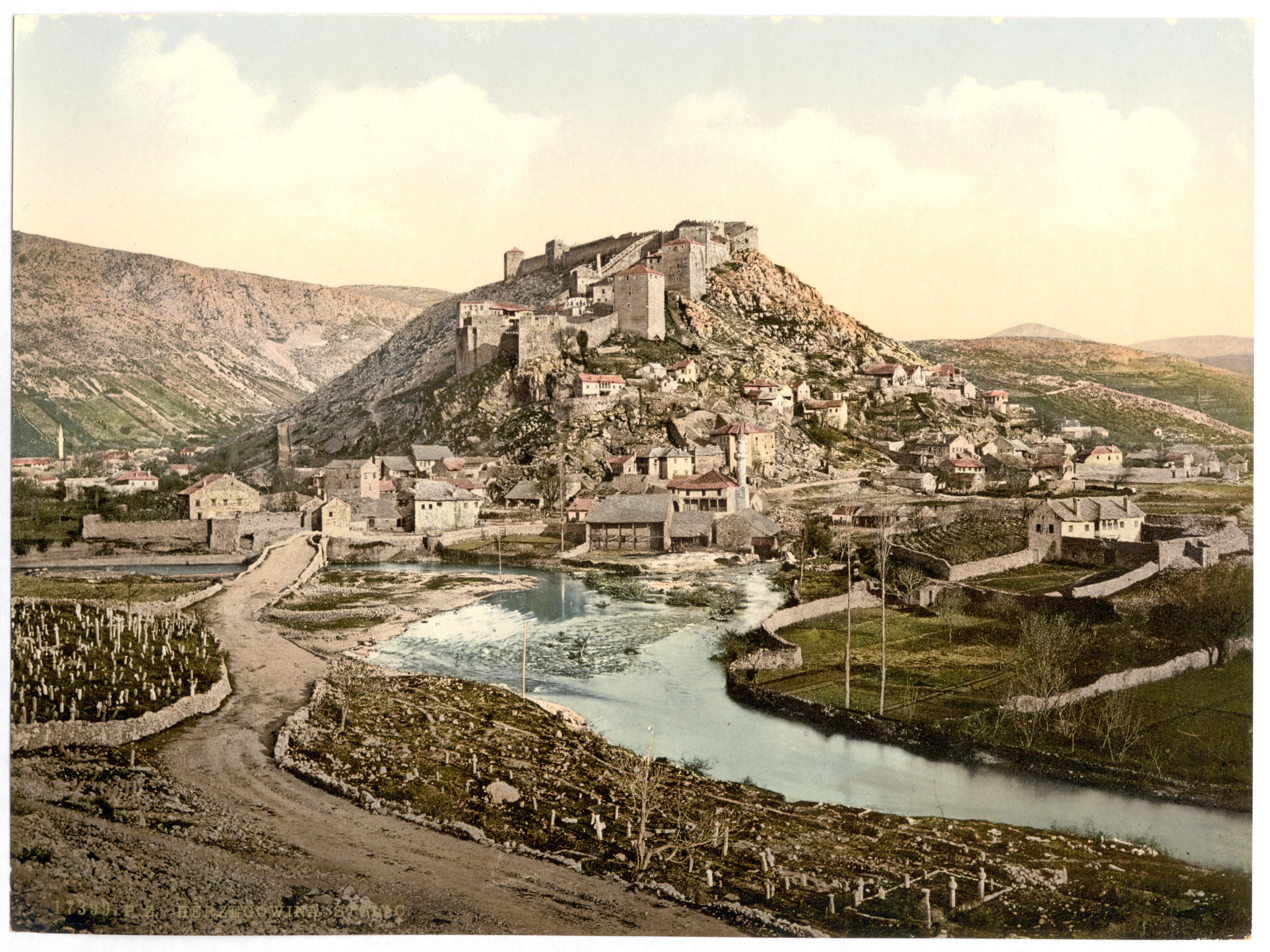
Vidoški fortress of Stolac, 1905

Stolac's historic core is an example of a complex cultural-historical and natural environmental ensemble.

During the Yugoslav Wars, a number of monuments were demolished by Croat extremists as part of a campaign of ethnic cleansing, including the town's four mosques, dating from the 16th to 18th centuries, and the Orthodox Church of the Holy Assumption of Christ.

In 2003 the Commission to Preserve National Monuments of Bosnia and Herzegovina designated Stolac Old Town as a National Monument of Bosnia and Herzegovina. Article 3 of that decision provides that “only research and conservation work and rehabilitation and restoration works, shall be allowed to be carried out, including the works aimed at promoting the National Monument” and “no buildings or any temporary and permanent structures shall be allowed to be constructed and erected at the site of the national monument unless their sole purpose is to protect and promote the monument.”

=== "Way of the Cross" ===
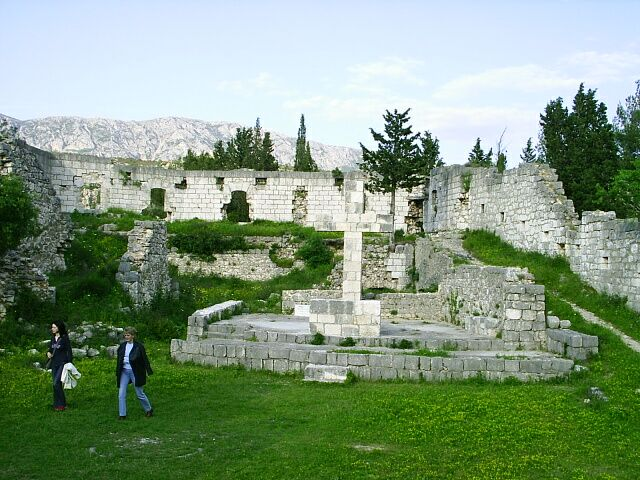
4-mt stone cross built in 2004 within the Stolac Fortress as a first marker of the 14-station "way of the cross"

During war-time HVO control, city authorities controlled by HDZ BiH decided to build 14 crosses marking the “Stations of the Cross” within Old Town Stolac. They started from the Old Town Fortress, ultimately constructing eight wooden crosses. In 2002, they replaced the first wooden cross with a four-meter high stone cross, despite objections from the Commission to Preserve National Monuments of Bosnia and Herzegovina, which in 2003 designated the whole old town as National Monument. The following year, city authorities started replacing the other wooden crosses with concrete crosses. The Federation Ministry for Spatial Planning ordered the removal of the concrete crosses and the halting of works. This decision has never been implemented.

The saga restarted in 2019 when the Catholic Church Parish Office of St. Elias the Prophet in Stolac decided to build an additional six crosses to complete the “Stations of Cross.” The Stolac Municipal Council greenlighted the project in November. Mayor Boskovic claims the six crosses fall in the second zone of the protected area and do not desecrate the monument and that the municipality has a positive opinion from the Herzegovina-Neretva Canton's Institute for Protection of National Monuments. The new construction commenced in early 2020 but was called off due to the COVID-19 pandemic. In February, the Federation Inspectorate ordered the removal of all 14 cross foundations. Stolac Municipality appealed the decision, and on 16 March the Federation Ministry for Spatial Planning annulled the Inspectorate's decision, stating that the first instance body had “wrongly established the factual situation.” Construction of the six new crosses resumed on 29 June 2020.

== Tourist attractions ==
- Badanj Cave
- Bregava
- Ošanići
- Radimlja

== Notable people ==
- Sulejman Šarac (1850–1927), Grand Mufti for Bosnia and Herzegovina (1910 to 1912)
- Mak Dizdar (1917–1971), poet
- Asaf Duraković (1940–2020), physician and poet
- Nijaz Duraković (1949–2012), university professor, founder of Social-Democratic Party of Bosnia and Herzegovina, war-time Bosniak member of rotating presidency of Bosnia and Herzegovina
- Mustafa Golubić (1889/1891–1941), member of Young Bosnia
- Alija Isaković (1932–1997), writer, publicist and playwright
- Jazzar Pasha (1720/30s – 1804) converted to Islam and became the Ottoman governor of Sidon (1776–1804)
- Muhamed Mehmedbašić (1887–1943), member of Young Bosnia
- Ali Pasha Rizvanbegović (1783–1851), administrator of Stolac from 1813 to 1833
- Zdravko Šotra (1933–2025), film director
- Nikola Katić (born 1996), Bosnian football player
- Rade Hamović, general
- Darijana Filipović (born 1987), designate Croat representative of the Presidency of Bosnia and Herzegovina

== Demographics ==
=== Population ===
Population of settlements – Stolac municipality
	Settlement	1971.	1981.	1991.	2013.
	Total	19,230	18,910	18,681	14,889
1	Aladinići			747	1,234
2	Bjelojevići			325	229
3	Borojevići			717	601
4	Burmazi			369	223
5	Crnići-Greda			658	1,501
6	Crnići-Kula			628	570
7	Hodovo			418	377
8	Kruševo			300	241
9	Ošanjići			1,102	1,004
10	Pješivac-Greda			512	417
11	Pješivac-Kula			823	744
12	Poplat			457	1,402
13	Poprati			340	250
14	Prenj			790	684
15	Rotimlja			718	683
16	Stolac	3,809	5,210	5,530	3,816
17	Trijebanj			352	278

=== Ethnic composition ===
Following the Dayton peace treaty, the territory of the 1991 municipality of Stolac was divided between the municipality of Stolac in the Federation of Bosnia and Herzegovina and the new municipality of Berkovići in Republika Srpska, where most of the Bosnian Serbs from Stolac now reside.

Ethnic composition – Stolac town
	2013.	1991.	1981.	1971.
Total	3,816 (100,0%)	5,530 (100,0%)	5,210 (100,0%)	3,809 (100,0%)
Muslims/Bosniaks	2,647 (69,37%)	3,426 (61,95%)	3,113 (59,75%)	2,437 (63,98%)
Croats	892 (23,38%)	653 (11,81%)	586 (11,25%)	421 (11,05%)
Serbs	144 (3,774%)	1,111 (20,09%)	982 (18,85%)	846 (22,21%)
Others	133 (3,485%)	101 (1,826%)	8 (0,154%)	22 (0,578%)
Yugoslavs		239 (4,322%)	486 (9,328%)	43 (1,129%)
Montenegrins			28 (0,537%)	35 (0,919%)
Albanians			5 (0,096%)	5 (0,131%)
Macedonians			2 (0,038%)	

Ethnic composition – Stolac municipality
	2013.	1991.	1981.	1971.
Total	14,889 (100,0%)	18,681 (100,0%)	18,910 (100,0%)	19,230 (100,0%)
Croats	8,486 (58,52%)	6,188 (33,12%)	6,410 (33,90%)	7,041 (36,61%)
Muslims/Bosniaks	5,544 (38,23%)	8,101 (43,36%)	7,359 (38,92%)	7,113 (36,99%)
Serbs	279 (1,924%)	3,917 (20,97%)	4,332 (22,91%)	4,900 (25,48%)
Others	193 (1,331%)	168 (0,899%)	49 (0,259%)	56 (0,291%)
Yugoslavs		307 (1,643%)	711 (3,760%)	63 (0,328%)
Montenegrins			33 (0,175%)	50 (0,260%)
Roma			7 (0,037%)	
Albanians			6 (0,032%)	6 (0,031%)
Macedonians			3 (0,016%)	1 (0,005%)

== Settlements of Stolac municipality, 1991 ==
Aladinići, Barane, Berkovići, Bitunja, Bjelojevići, Borojevići, Brštanik, Burmazi, Crnići-Greda, Crnići-Kula, Dabrica, Do, Hatelji, Hodovo, Hrgud, Komanje Brdo, Kozice, Kruševo, Ljubljenica, Ljuti Do, Meča, Orahovica, Ošanići, Pješivac-Greda, Pješivac-Kula, Poplat, Poprati, Predolje, Prenj, Rotimlja, Stolac, Strupići, Suzina, Šćepan Krst, Trijebanj, Trusina and Žegulja.

== Climate ==
Climate in this area has mild differences between highs and lows, and there is adequate rainfall year-round. The Köppen Climate Classification subtype for this climate is "Cfa" (Humid subtropical climate).

Climate data for Stolac
Month	Jan	Feb	Mar	Apr	May	Jun	Jul	Aug	Sep	Oct	Nov	Dec	Year
Mean daily maximum °C (°F)	9 (48)	11 (51)	15 (59)	19 (67)	24 (75)	29 (85)	33 (92)	33 (91)	28 (82)	22 (71)	16 (60)	9 (49)	21 (69)
Mean daily minimum °C (°F)	3 (37)	2 (36)	6 (43)	9 (48)	13 (55)	17 (62)	19 (66)	19 (66)	16 (61)	12 (54)	9 (48)	4 (39)	11 (51)
Average precipitation cm (inches)	13 (5)	12 (4.7)	13 (5.2)	13 (5.2)	7.9 (3.1)	8.4 (3.3)	4.8 (1.9)	4.3 (1.7)	10 (4)	17 (6.5)	19 (7.3)	18 (7.2)	140 (55.1)
Source: Weatherbase

== See also ==
- Daorson
