= Trijebanj =

- Village
- Location within Bosnia and Herzegovina
- Coordinates: 43.1729446°N 17.8539937°E
- Country: Bosnia and Herzegovina
- Entity: Federation of Bosnia and Herzegovina
- Canton: Herzegovina-Neretva
- Municipality: Stolac

Area
  - Total: 5.22 sq mi (13.53 km^{2})

Population (2013)
  - Total: 278
  - Density: 53.2/sq mi (20.5/km^{2})
- Time zone: UTC+1 (CET)
  - Summer (DST): UTC+2 (CEST)

Trijebanj is a village in the municipality of Stolac, Bosnia and Herzegovina.

== Demographics ==
According to the 2013 census, its population was 278.

Ethnicity in 2013
Ethnicity	Number	Percentage
Croats	197	70.9%
Bosniaks	55	19.8%
Serbs	23	8.3%
other/undeclared	3	1.1%
Total	278	100%
