= Ivo Lučić =

Dr. Ivo Lučić
- Born: 1960 (age 65–66); Ravno
- Citizenship: Bosnia and Herzegovina, Croatia
- Occupations: Journalist, karstologist, ecologist
- Known for: Leading Bosnian UNESCO World Heritage Site nomination of Vjetrenica Cave.
- Awards: -

Academic background
- Education: Elementary and secondary school in Dubrovnik, Faculty of Political Science, University of Zagreb, graduation year 1986
- Alma mater: University of Nova Gorica
- Thesis: Karstology Presvlačenje krša (2009)

Academic work
- Discipline: Ecology
- Sub-discipline: Karstologist
- Main interests: Dinaric Karst
- Notable works: Presvlačenje krša, Humski put

Ivo Lučić (born 1960 in Ravno), is a Bosnian and Herzegovinian journalist and karstologist. He is a writer, scientific journalist and an ecology activist, interested in the research and protection of nature, especially Bosnia and Herzegovina part of the Dinaric karst, and its hydrology and geology. He is one of the founding members of the Centar za krš i speleologiju of the Academy of Sciences and Arts of Bosnia and Herzegovina (ANUBiH).

== Early life and education ==
Lučić was born in 1960 in Ravno, Bosnia and Herzegovina (then Socialist Republic of Bosnia and Herzegovina), which is the largest settlement in the western part of the Popovo Polje and one of the largest karstic depressions in Bosnia and Herzegovina. He completed primary and secondary school in nearby Dubrovnik, across the border in SR Croatia. He then graduated in 1986 at the Faculty of Political Sciences, University of Zagreb. He received his doctorate in 2009 on the study of karstology at the University of Nova Gorica in Slovenia.

== Interests ==
His scientific interests are the perception and valorisation of nature and environment, especially karst, and the popularization of science. He is the author, co-author and editor of several books on karst, and the role of the media in modern society, as well as the writer of numerous scientific articles. He participated in dozens of scientific and professional meetings in the country and abroad, and organized workshops, round tables and seminars on environmental issues.

He is one of the co-founders and a member of the Center for Karstology of ANUBiH (Serbo-Croatian: Centar za krš i speleologiju Bosne i Hercegovine), and is the initiator and coordinator of the Vjetrenica Cave research, popularization and protection project between 1999 and 2009, within which Vjetrenica was confirmed as a place with the great underground biological diversity, and was nominated for the World Heritage Site List and in 2024 placed on the List for Bosnia and Herzegovina.

== Works ==
- Selo moje Ravno: povijest stradanja Hrvata u Popovu. Zagreb 1992. 152 str.
- Ravno, Popovo: četiri slike iz povijesti kraja. Humski zbornik; 3. Ravno, Zagreb 1997. 432 str. ISBN 953-6590-00-X. 1997. (ur)
- Lučić, Ivo, Sertić-Janković, Mirela: Obiteljski radio: pet godina. Zagreb, Obiteljski radio, 2001. 147 str. ISBN 953-98476-0-5
- Bonacci, Ognjen, Lučić, Ivo, Marjanac, Tihomir, Perica, Dražen, Vujčić-Karlo, Snježana: Krš bez granica : popularno-znanstvena monografija. Zagreb, 2008.
- Vjetrenica – pogled u dušu zemlje : znanstveno-popularna monografija, ArTresor, Zagreb – Ravno, 2003. ISBN 953-99284-0-0, 953-6522-40-3
- Povijest poznavanja Dinarskog krša na primjeru Popova polja. Disertacija. Nova Gorica, 523 str, 2009.
- Lučić, Ivo, Rudež, Tanja (ur.): Mediji i znanost – Zbornik radova okruglog stola o 100. obljetnici HND-a, Datapress HND i Treći program HRT-a, Zagreb, 2010.
- Mulaomerović, Jasminko, Lučić, Ivo i Osmanković, Jasmina: Krš i pećine Bosne i Hercegovine: prošlost za budućnost, Centar za speleologiju, Sarajevo, 2012., 90 str. ISBN 978-9958-9932-0-6,
- Presvlačenje krša: povijest poznavanja Dinarskog krša na primjeru Popova polja, Synopsis, Zagreb-Sarajevo, 2019. ISBN 978-953-7968-63-2, 978-9958-01-054-5
- Lučić, Ivo (ur.) Značenja krajolika. Disput, Zagreb, 2021. ISBN 978-953-260-416-0
- K bosanskom oceanu. Kratki ogledi o percepciji prirode u Bosni i Hercegovini. Centar za krš i speleologiju, Sarajevo; Synopsis, Sarajevo – Zagreb. ISBN 978-9926-8278-6-1 (Centar za krš i speleologiju), 978-953-8289-64-4 (Synopsis, Zagreb)
- Humski put; exploration of the ancient practice of transhumant pastoralism in Bosnia and Herzegovina; published by Synopsis, Sarajevo, 2024, ISBN 9789538289750
