= Ozren (Bosnia and Herzegovina) =

Mountain in Bosnia and Herzegovina

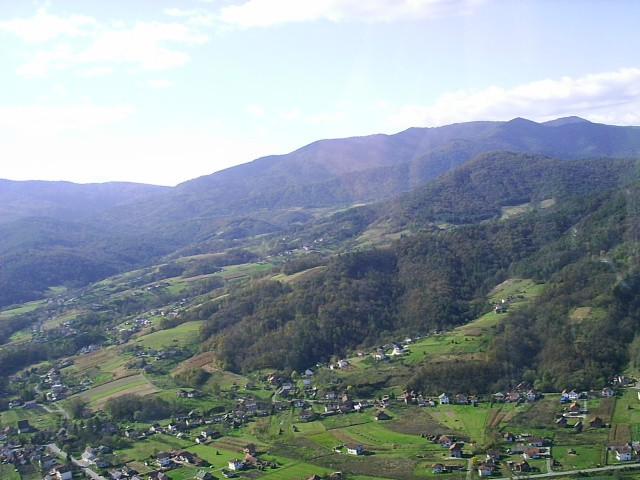

Highest point
- Coordinates: 44°35′25″N 18°16′57″E

Geography
- Location within Bosnia and Herzegovina
- Location: Bosnia and Herzegovina

Ozren is a mountain in northern Bosnia and Herzegovina. It lies between cities of Doboj and Zavidovići, partly in the Federation of Bosnia and Herzegovina and partly in Republika Srpska.

Ozren is rich in natural resources. It abounds in drinkable water springs surrounded by clean nature, thermal wells with healing effects, ore and mineral resources. Its highest peak, Ostravica, is 918 meters high.

== Intangible Heritage of Bosnia and Herzegovina ==
Picking of iva grass on Ozren mountain is traditional activity of picking of iva grass performed by locals. At the 13th session of the Intergovernmental Commission for the Preservation of Intangible Heritage in 2018 (13.COM), thanks to its characteristics and specifics, picking of iva grass on Ozren was inscribed on UNESCO's representative list of intangible world heritage.

== See also ==
- Zmijanje embroidery
- Mowing on Kupres
