= Zavala Monastery =

Serbian Orthodox monastery near Trebinje, Bosnia and Herzegovina

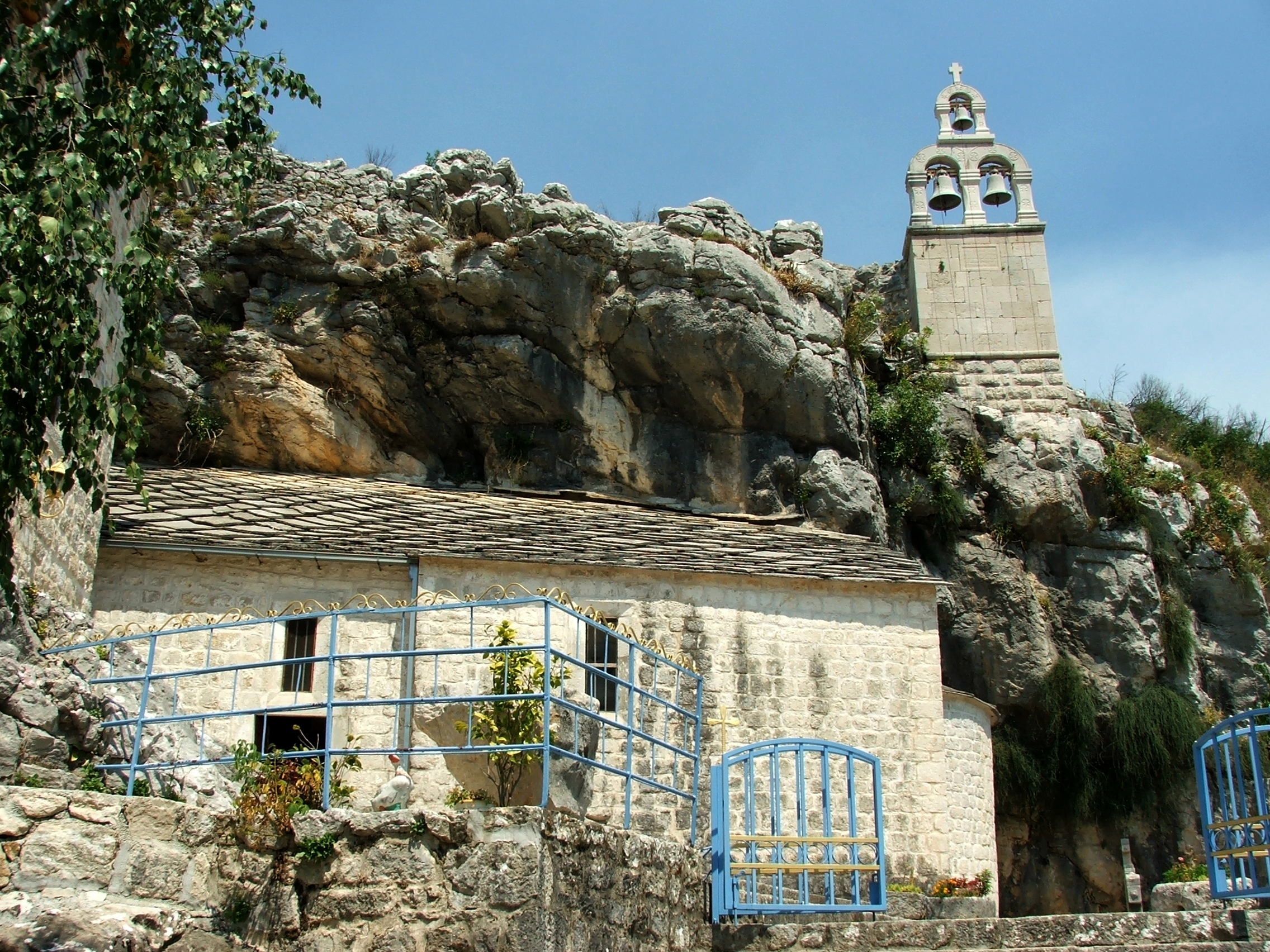
- Zavala monastery, pictured in 2017

- Location within Bosnia and Herzegovina

Religion
- Affiliation: Serbian Orthodox Church
- Rite: Eastern Orthodox
- Ecclesiastical or organisational status: Eparchy of Zachlumia, Herzegovina, and the Littoral
- Patron: Dormition of the Theotokos
- Year consecrated: c. 1514

Location
- Location: Zavala
- Municipality: Ravno
- State: Bosnia and Herzegovina
- Interactive map of Zavala Monastery
- Coordinates: 42.8497°N 17.9796°E

Architecture
- Materials: stone
- KONS of Bosnia and Herzegovina
- Official name: "Church of the Presentation of the Virgin in Zavala, the architectural ensemble (1820)".
- Type: Category I cultural property
- Criteria: A, B, C i.ii.iii.iv.v.vi., D iii.iv., E ii.iii.iv.v., F i.iii., G i.ii.iii.iv.v.vi., H i.ii.iii.
- Designated: 5 March 2003 (?th session)
- Reference no.: 1820
- Decision No.: 08.2-6-148/03-2
- Status: List of National Monuments of Bosnia and Herzegovina

The Zavala Monastery (Serbian: Манастир Завала, romanized: Manastir Zavala; Croatian: Samostan Zavala) is a Serbian Orthodox monastery located in the village of Zavala on the southwestern edge of Popovo Polje, in Ravno, Bosnia and Herzegovina municipality, in the southernmost part of Bosnia and Herzegovina.

The northern wall of the monastery's church is situated within a cave. This monastery is also known as a place where Basil of Ostrog entered into monasticism.

== History ==
The Zavala Monastery was first mentioned in 1514, when abbot Serafion bought a vineyard in Orahov Do from certain Božo, son of Radoslav. Two years later, in 1516, the Ottomans ordered the destruction of Catholic churches built before the conquest of Herzegovina. For this reason, many Catholics in the wider Popovo Polje region converted to Eastern Orthodoxy. The proximity of the Zavala monastery was the main factor in their conversion. In 1587, the monastery received approval from the Sultan to be renovated according to the original dimensions.

During World War II, the monastery suffered major damage, and in the Bosnian War, it was further damaged and abandoned. In the early 21st century, the frescoes were restored, the church and dormitories were renovated, and the monastery became active again.

The site of the restored monastery, together with Zavala's village old architecture and stone masonry, and with Vjetrenica cave, constitutes cultural-historic, architectural and natural assemble, protected by KONS as an important national monument of Bosnia and Herzegovina. Because of its importance as national heritage, as well as tourist and ambiental attraction, the site is also placed on the UNESCO Tentative list for inscription into UNESCO World Heritage Site list.

== See also ==
- List of Serbian Orthodox monasteries
