= Zavala, Ravno =

Zavala Завала
- Village
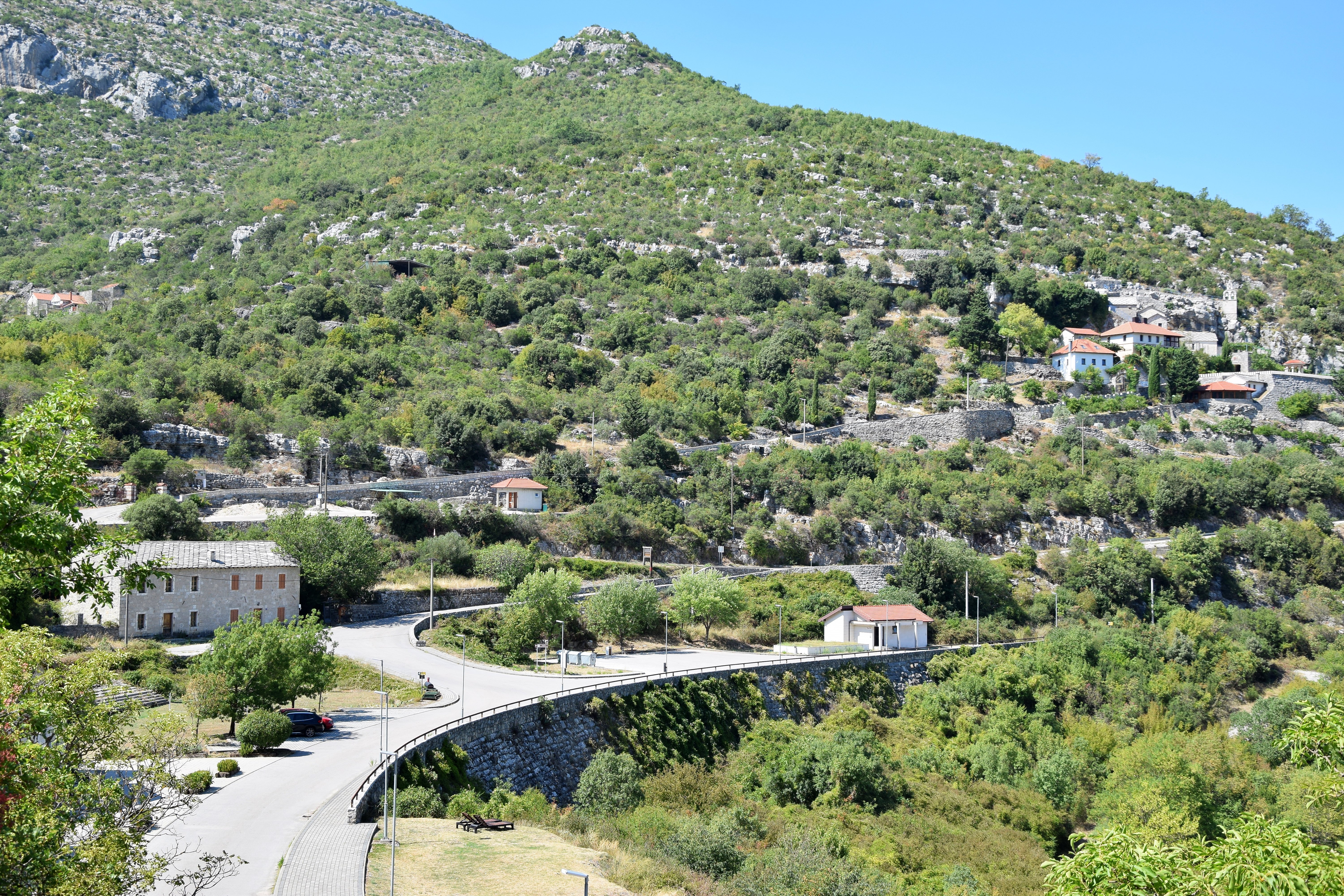

- Location within Bosnia and Herzegovina
- Coordinates: 42°51′N 17°59′E
- Country: Bosnia and Herzegovina
- Entity: Federation of Bosnia and Herzegovina
- Canton: Herzegovina-Neretva
- Municipality: Ravno

Area
  - Total: 3.94 sq mi (10.21 km^{2})

Population (2013)
  - Total: 186
  - Density: 47.2/sq mi (18.2/km^{2})
- Time zone: UTC+1 (CET)
  - Summer (DST): UTC+2 (CEST)

Zavala (Serbian Cyrillic: Завала) is a village in the Ravno municipality, in Bosnia and Herzegovina.

== Geography ==
Zavala is situated in the south-western expanse of Popovo polje, within the southernmost reaches of Bosnia and Herzegovina. The village is also located approximately 400 meters away from the Vjetrenica cave. Zavala includes the hamlet of Mareva Ljut.

== History ==
Zavala was part of the medieval župa (county) of Popovo, mentioned in a charter issued by Grand Prince Miroslav of Hum to the Church of St. Peter by the Lim river at the end of the 12th century. The village of Zavala was mentioned in a document dated 1372. In the 14th century, Popovo was governed by the Nikolić noble family, and then the Sanković noble family. Throughout the 15th century, until the region fell to the Ottoman Empire, the Kosača family held possession of Popovo. The Klisura fort was built by the Kosača on the hills above Zavala in the early 15th century.

Before the Ottoman conquest of Bosnia and Herzegovina, the village was mainly Catholic. After the Ottoman conquest, the Catholic clergy left the area, which was filled in by the Eastern Orthodox priests. The Eastern Orthodox Zavala monastery was established around 1514. Two years later, in 1516, the Ottomans ordered the destruction of Catholic churches built before the conquest of Herzegovina. For this reason, many Catholics in Zavala converted to Eastern Orthodoxy. The proximity of the Zavala monastery was the main factor in their conversion. In the early 17th century, the majority of Catholics in the village converted to Eastern Orthodoxy. Bishop Dominik reported in 1629 that Zavala and the nearby village of Čvaljina had forty families, of which eight were Catholics. The rest converted to Eastern Orthodoxy.

From 1961 to 1991, Zavala was the seat of the Zavala municipality.

== Culture ==
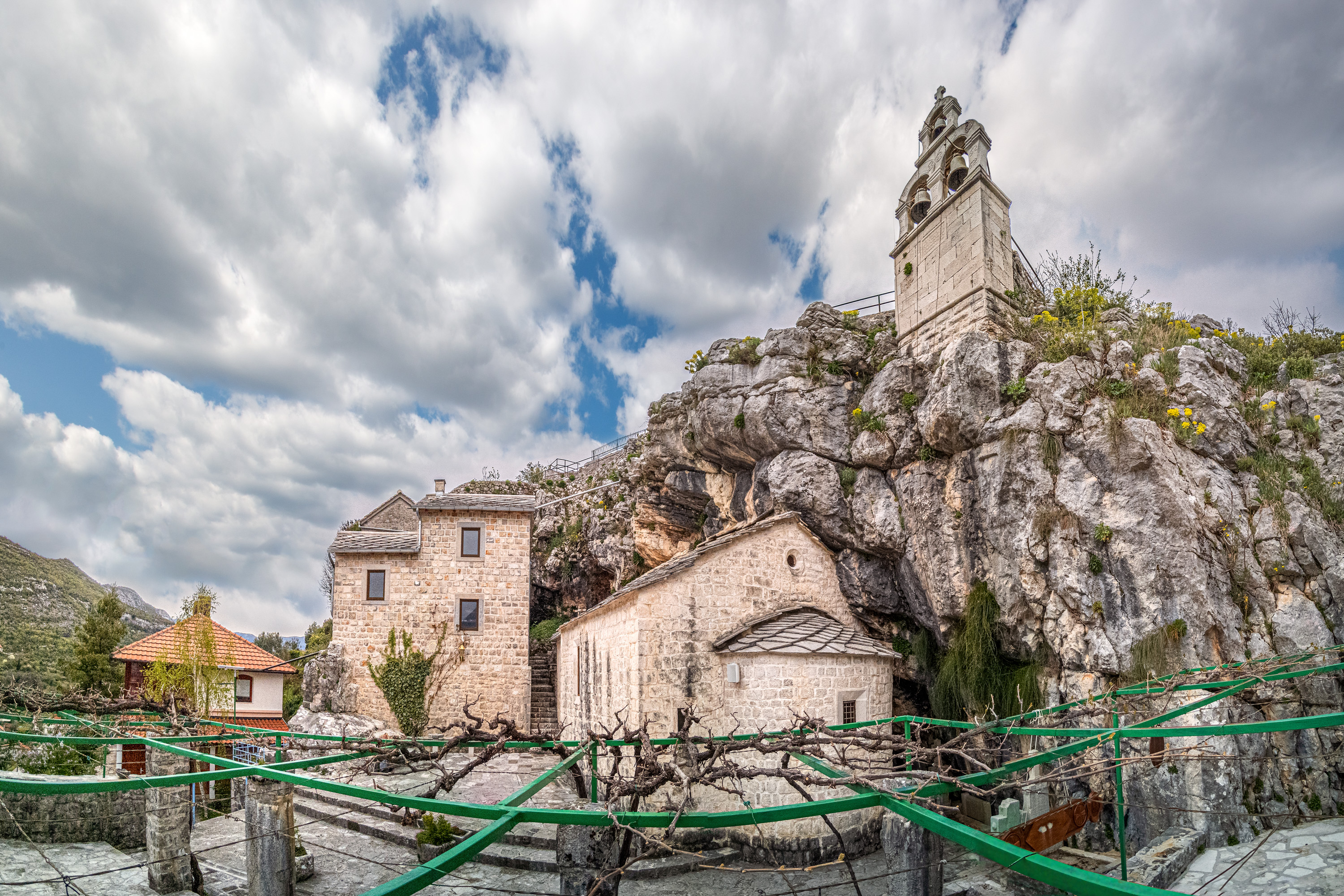
Zavala Monastery

Zavala Monastery is one of the most important monasteries in East Herzegovina. It was first mentioned in 1514, when the monastery purchased a vineyard in Orahov Do. First restoration was in 1587 and the church was vividly painted in 1619 by Georgije Mitrofanović. The monastery is also known as the place where Basil of Ostrog, from nearby Mrkonjići, entered into monasticism.

== Anthropology ==
The families of Zavala before the Yugoslav wars were the Vukanović, Korać, Čalank, Andrić, Jović, Srba, Šešelj, Tupajić, Turanjanin, Nedić, Vulić. These have mostly left for Trebinje.

== Demographics ==
In the 1991 census, the village itself had 105 inhabitants, of whom 89 were ethnic Serbs, 12 Croats, and 4 Yugoslavs.

According to the 2013 census, its population was 186.

Ethnicity in 2013
Ethnicity	Number	Percentage
Croats	143	76.9%
Serbs	43	23.1%
Total	186	100%
