= Church of St. Archangel Michael, Veličani =

Church of St. Archangel Michael
- Црква светог Арханђела Михајла
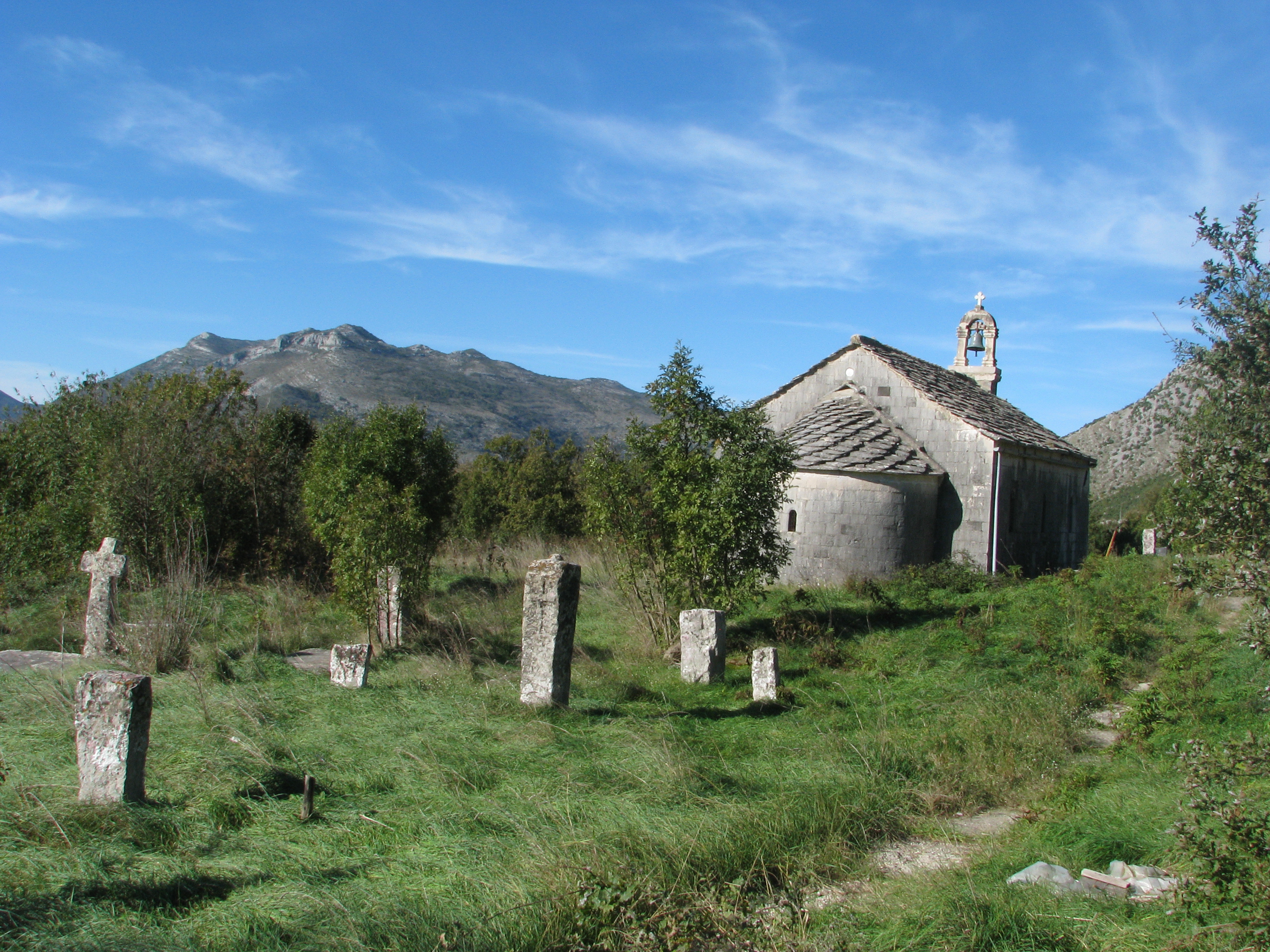
- Church of St. Archangel Michael with a medieval Stećak necropolis

- Location within Bosnia and Herzegovina
- 42.865108°N 18.020770°E
- Location: Veličani, Popovo Polje
- Country: Bosnia and Herzegovina
- Denomination: Serbian Orthodox Church

Architecture
- Heritage designation: National Monument
- Designated: 4 March 2003
- Style: single-nave with semi-circular apse and a small preslica bell tower
- Completed: 1863

Specifications
- Length: 972 metres (3,189 ft)
- Width: 760 metres (2,490 ft)
- Materials: Limestone

Church of St. Archangel Michael (Serbian Cyrillic: Црква Светог Арханђела Михајла) is Orthodox Christian church in Bosnia and Herzegovina. It is located in Veličani village within contemporary Orthodox cemetery, in a central part of Popovo Polje, municipality Trebinje, Republika Srpska entity.

== National monument ==
Church is surrounded with medieval Stećak necropolis, and together they constitute an assemble, which is designated a National monument of Bosnia and Herzegovina, and declared by Commission to preserve national monuments of Bosnia and Herzegovina on 4 March 2003.
