= List of heritage registers in Bosnia and Herzegovina =

List-class article of heritage registers, Bosnia and Herzegovina

Emblem of the International Committee of the Blue Shield that uses the protection logo of the Hague Convention of 1954

National Monuments of Bosnia and Herzegovina are declared and maintained through the Commission to preserve national monuments of Bosnia and Herzegovina or KONS.

== State level ==
- Commission to preserve national monuments of Bosnia and Herzegovina
- Central Register of Monuments

Also, a Bosnia and Herzegovina state commission for cooperation with the UNESCO is established:

- State Commission of Bosnia and Herzegovina for UNESCO

== Local level ==
Local level include entity registers, district Brčko, cantonal, and regional registers:

- Institute for the Protection of Monuments of the Federation of Bosnia and Herzegovina [Zavod za zaštitu spomenika Federacija Bosne i Hercegovine]
- Republic Institute for Protection of Cultural and Natural Heritage of Republic of Srpska [Republic Institute for Protection of Cultural and Natural Heritage of Republic of Srpska]
- Institute for the Protection of Monuments District Brčko [Zavod za zaštitu spomenika District Brčko] (Služba za turizam Vlade Brčko distrikta Bosne i Hercegovine)
- Cantonal Institute for the Protection of Cultural–Historical and Natural Heritage Sarajevo [Kantonalni zavod za zaštitu kulturno–historijskog i prirodnog naslijeđa Sarajevo]
- Public Institution Institute for the Protection and Use of Cultural–Historical and Natural Heritage of Tuzla Canton [JU Zavod za zaštitu i korištenje kulturno–historijskog i prirodnog naslijeđa Tuzlanskog kantona]
- Cantonal Institute for Urbanism, Spatial Planning and Protection of the Cultural and Historical Heritage of the Central Bosnian Canton [Kantonalni zavod za urbanizam, prostorno planiranje i zaštitu kulturno–historijskog naslijeđa Srednjobosanskog Kantona]
- Institute for the Protection of Cultural and Historical Heritage of Herzegovina–Neretva Canton [Zavod za zaštitu kulturno–historijske baštine Hercegovačko–Neretvanskog Kantona]
- Public Institution Institute for the Protection of Cultural Heritage Bihać – Una-Sana Canton [JU Zavod za zaštitu kulturnog naslijeđa Bihać – Unsko–Sanski Kanton]
- Institute for the Protection of Cultural Heritage of the Zenica–Doboj Canton [Zavod za zaštitu kulturne baštine Zeničko–dobojskog kantona]
- Public Institution Agency for cultural–historical and natural heritage and development of the tourist potential of the city of Jajce [JU Agencija za kulturno–povijesnu i prirodnu baštinu i razvoj turističkih potencijala grada Jajca]

== See also ==
- Cultural heritage
- National heritage site
- World Heritage Site
- List of heritage registers
- List of National Monuments of Bosnia and Herzegovina
- List of Intangible Cultural Heritage of Bosnia and Herzegovina
- List of World Heritage Sites in Bosnia and Herzegovina
- List of fortifications in Bosnia and Herzegovina
- List of bridges in Bosnia and Herzegovina
- List of World War II monuments and memorials in Bosnia and Herzegovina
- List of People's Heroes of Yugoslavia monuments in Bosnia and Herzegovina
- List of museums in Bosnia and Herzegovina
