= List of Intangible Cultural Heritage elements in Bosnia and Herzegovina =

The United Nations Educational, Scientific and Cultural Organisation (UNESCO) intangible cultural heritage elements are the non-physical traditions and practices performed by a people. As part of a country's cultural heritage, they include celebrations, festivals, performances, oral traditions, music, and the making of handicrafts. The "intangible cultural heritage" is defined by the Convention for the Safeguarding of Intangible Cultural Heritage, drafted in 2003 and took effect in 2006. Inscription of new heritage elements on the UNESCO Intangible Cultural Heritage Lists is determined by the Intergovernmental Committee for the Safeguarding of Intangible Cultural Heritage, an organisation established by the convention.

Bosnia and Herzegovina ratified the convention 17 October 2003 and 23 February 2009, respectively. Also, a Bosnia and Herzegovina state commission for cooperation with the UNESCO is established.

== Intangible Cultural Heritage of Humanity ==
+ Transnational element

=== Representative List ===
Name	Image	Year	No.	Description
Zmijanje embroidery		2014	00990	Zmijanje embroidery is a specific technique of embroidery practised by the women of villages in the area of Zmijanje on Manjača mountain.
Konjic woodcarving		2017	01288	Konjic woodcarving is a specific technique of woodcarving practised in Konjic.
Picking of iva grass on Ozren mountain		2018	01289	Picking of iva grass on Ozren mountain.
Grass mowing competition custom in Kupres		2020	01512	Mowing on Kupres or Štljanica is an annual mowing competition that takes place in July on the specific meadow of Štljanica in Kupres.
Lipizzan horse breeding traditions + (Note: Shared with Austria, Croatia, Hungary, Italy, Romania, Slovakia and Slovenia.)		2022	01687	
Sevdalinka, traditional urban folk song		2024	01872	

== See also ==
- List of World Heritage Sites in Bosnia and Herzegovina
