= Flood-meadow =

Land adjacent to a river subject to seasonal flooding

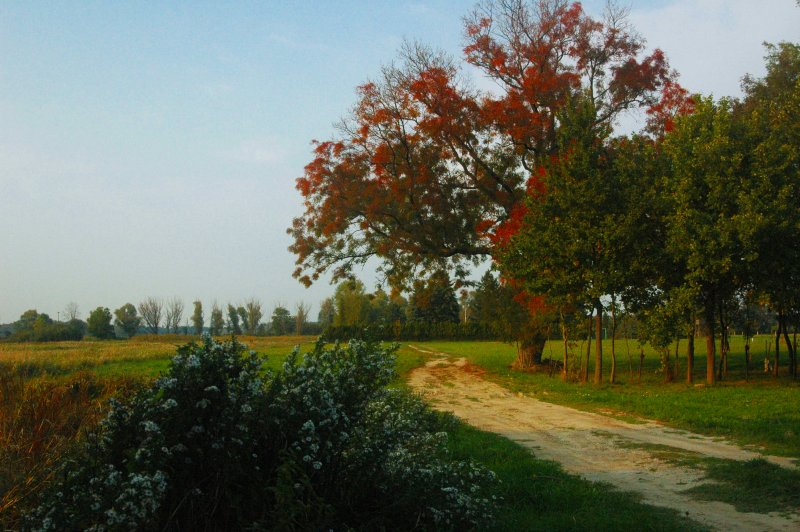
Flood-meadow near Hohenau an der March

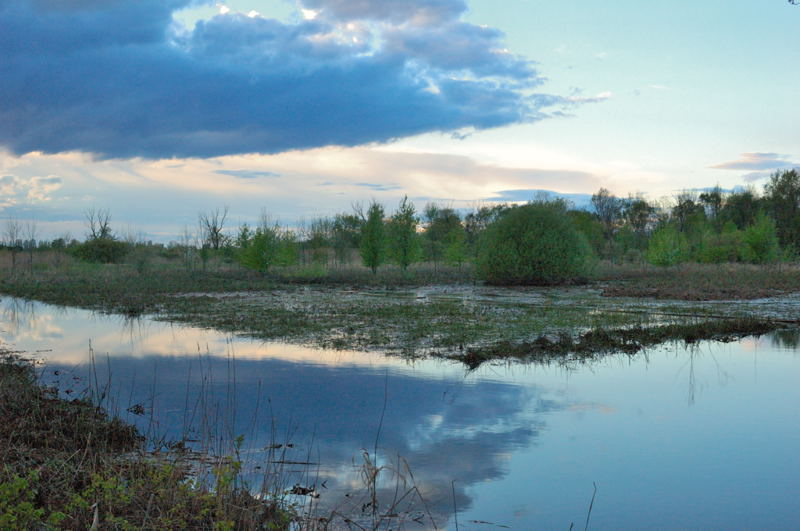
The same meadow in spring

A flood-meadow (or floodmeadow) is an area of grassland or pasture beside a river, subject to seasonal flooding. Flood-meadows are distinct from water-meadows in that the latter are artificially created and maintained, with flooding controlled on a seasonal and even daily basis.

== Examples ==
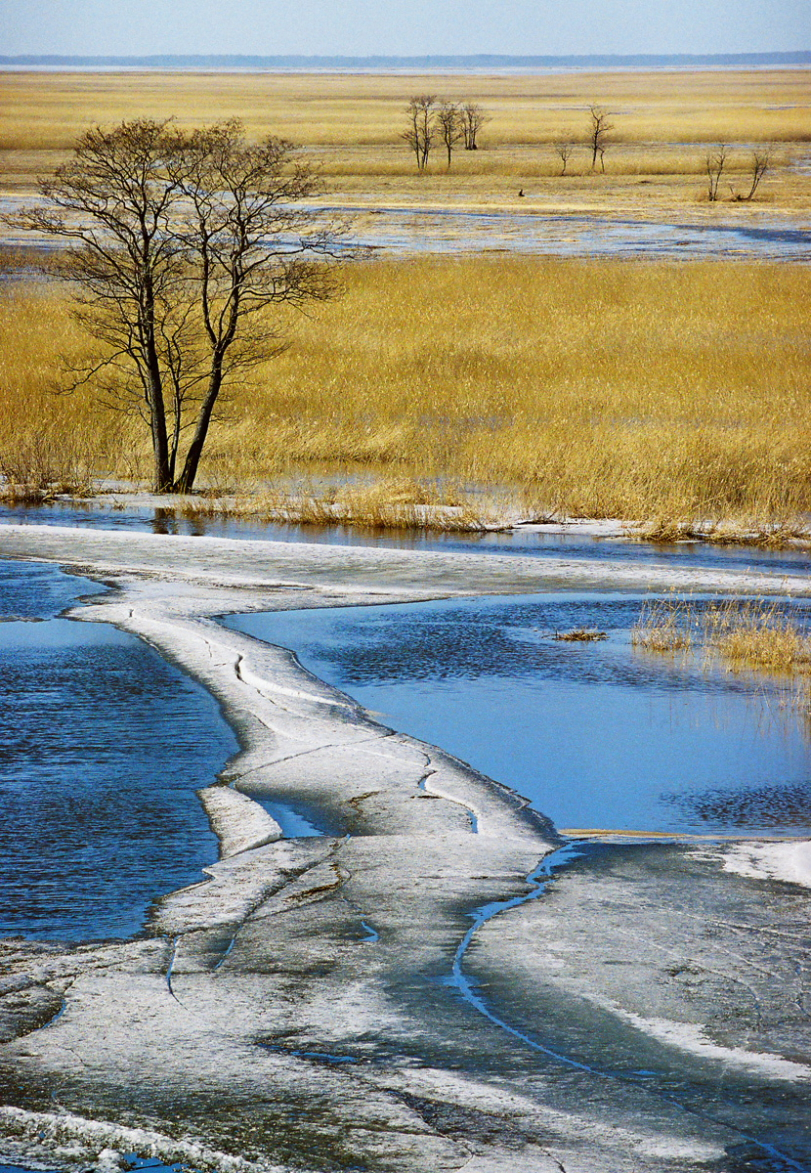
Kasari flood-meadow in early spring. Matsalu National Park, Estonia

Austria:

- Hohenau an der March

Bosnia and Herzegovina:

- List of karst polje in Bosnia and Herzegovina

Estonia:

- Emajõe flood-meadow
- Kasari, Matsalu National Park

Finland:

- Mattholmsfladan, Pargas
- Levänluhta, Isokyrö

Ireland:

- Shannon Callows

United Kingdom:

- Angel & Greyhound Meadow, Oxford
- Christchurch Meadows, Reading
- Christ Church Meadow, Oxford
- Mill Meadows, Henley-on-Thames
- Port Meadow, Oxford
- Mottey Meadows, Staffordshire
- Riverside Park, St Neots, Cambridgeshire

== See also ==
- Coastal plain
- Field
- Flooded grasslands and savannas
- Plain
- Prairie
- Riparian zone
- Wet meadow
- Floodplain
- Berm
