= Bišnja Monastery =

Serbian Orthodox monastery in Donja Bišnja

Coordinates: 44.956367°N 17.871762°E

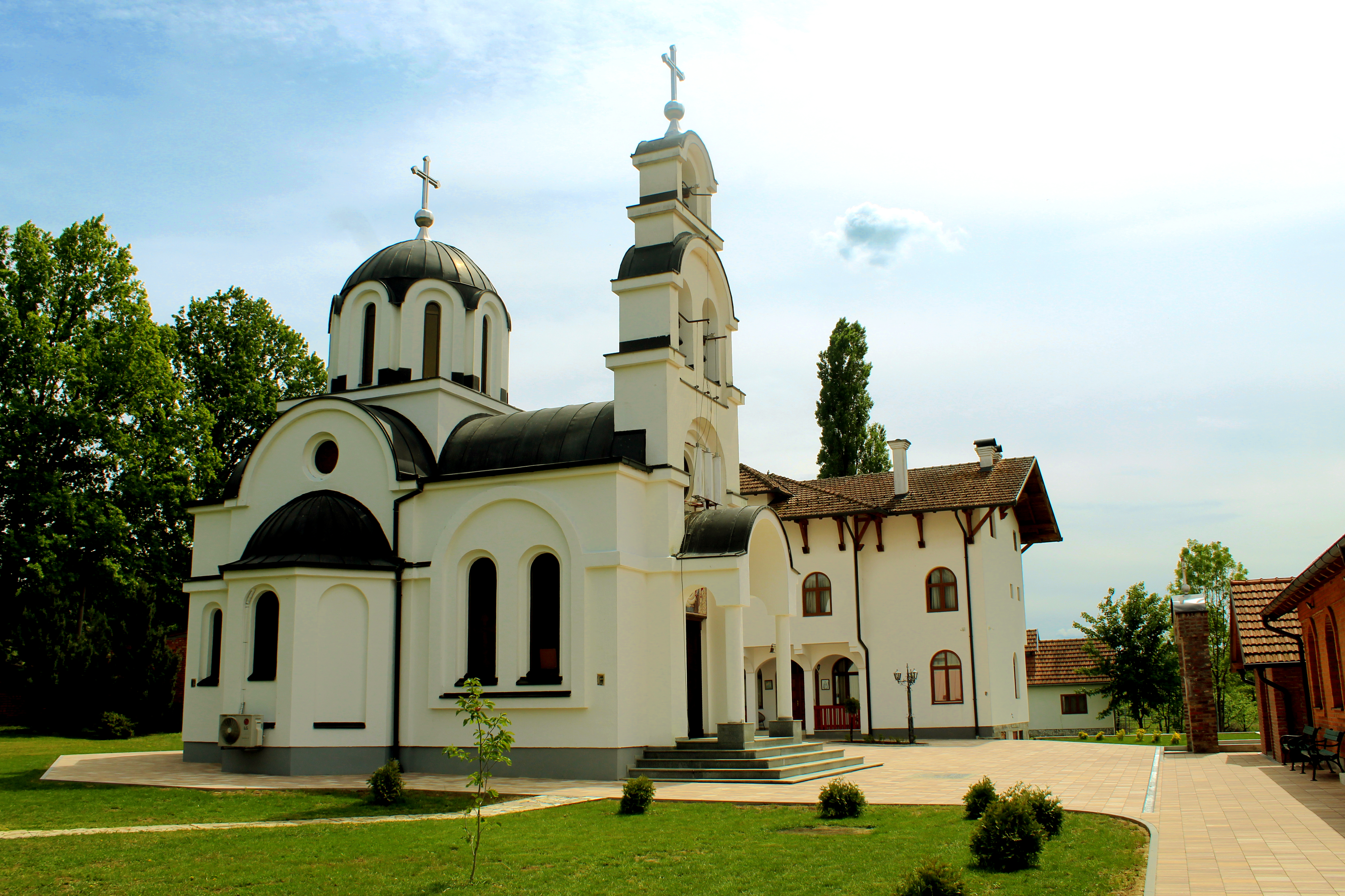
The Bišnja Monastery

The Bišnja Monastery (Serbian: Манастир Бишња, romanized: Manastir Bišnja) is a Serbian Orthodox monastery dedicated to the Intercession of the Theotokos and located in the village of Donja Bišnja, 5 kilometres from the town of Derventa, in Republika Srpska, Bosnia and Herzegovina. It was built through financial support from its ktitor, Ratko Đekić from San Diego, California. Its construction began in 2002 on the land that Đekić donated to the Serbian Orthodox Church, and the monastery was consecrated on 18 June 2006. Its first inhabitants were two monks who came from the Ozren Monastery and the Monastery of St. Basil of Ostrog, Bijeljina. The frescoes in the Bišnja Monastery's church were completed in 2011. The monastery owns an orchard of 1800 apple and pear trees, from whose fruits the monks produce rakia.
