= Sërbica e Epërme =

Sërbica e Epërme: Sërbica e Epërme (Albanian); Горња Србица/Gornja Srbica (Serbian)
- Village
- Location in Kosovo
- Coordinates: 42°16′47″N 20°43′19″E
- Location: Kosovo
- District: Prizren
- Municipality: Prizren

Population (2024)
  - Total: 100
- Time zone: UTC+1 (CET)
  - Summer (DST): UTC+2 (CEST)

Sërbica e Epërme (Serbian Cyrillic: Горња Србица; Albanian: Sërbica e Epërme) is a village in the Prizren Municipality in southern Kosovo.

== History ==
Sërbica e Epërme is first mentioned in a chrysobull of the Serbian Emperor Stefan Dušan in 1348, which described it as a village known for its many orchards. On the southern hill above the village on the remains of an old church, the local Serbs with the help of Prizren merchants and craftsmen, built a church in 1863 which was consecrated in the name of Basil of Ostrog. The church itself held many Christian Orthodox icons and artifacts from the surrounding villages. The church was destroyed in 1999 following the end of the Kosovo War.

A 1940 census of the village listed it as having 14 households in total. It consisted of 14 Serb (Christian Orthodox), 4 Albanian (Catholic faith) and 1 Roma (Unknown religion) households:

- Serb - Filipovic (1 home), Mihajlovic (2 homes), Sekulic (1 home), Vuca (3 homes), Andrejin (6 homes), Kostic (2 homes).
- Albanian - Bitici (2 homes), Kusnin (1 home), Tsac (1 home).
- Roma - Sefovic (1 home).

== Demographics ==
The village is exclusively inhabited by Kosovo Albanians.
