= Šešelj =

Šešelj is a Serbo-Croatian surname, borne by Croats and Serbs, found in Croatia, Bosnia and Herzegovina, and Serbia. It may refer to:

- Vojislav Šešelj, Serbian politician
- Jadranka Šešelj, Serbian politician
- Zlatko Šešelj, Croatian politician, Member of Parliament 2000–2003

== Anthropology ==
=== Popovo field ===
- In Zavala, there were 3 households of Šešelj, an Orthodox family (1959). They arrived six generations prior to 1959.
- In Orahov Do, an Orthodox family.

In Ljubo Mihić's work (1975), two houses of Šešelj in Mareva Ljut were registered, that had settled from Kotezi, and before that Veličani (in a place called Šešeljevina), ultimately hailing from Riđani from where Lazar moved, the fifth ancestor of Dušan Šešelj (born 1899).
