= Mrkonjići =

Mrkonjići Мркоњићи
- Village
- Location within Bosnia and Herzegovina
- Coordinates: 42°50′32″N 18°06′03″E
- Country: Bosnia and Herzegovina
- Entity: Republika Srpska
- Municipality: Trebinje
- Time zone: UTC+1 (CET)
  - Summer (DST): UTC+2 (CEST)

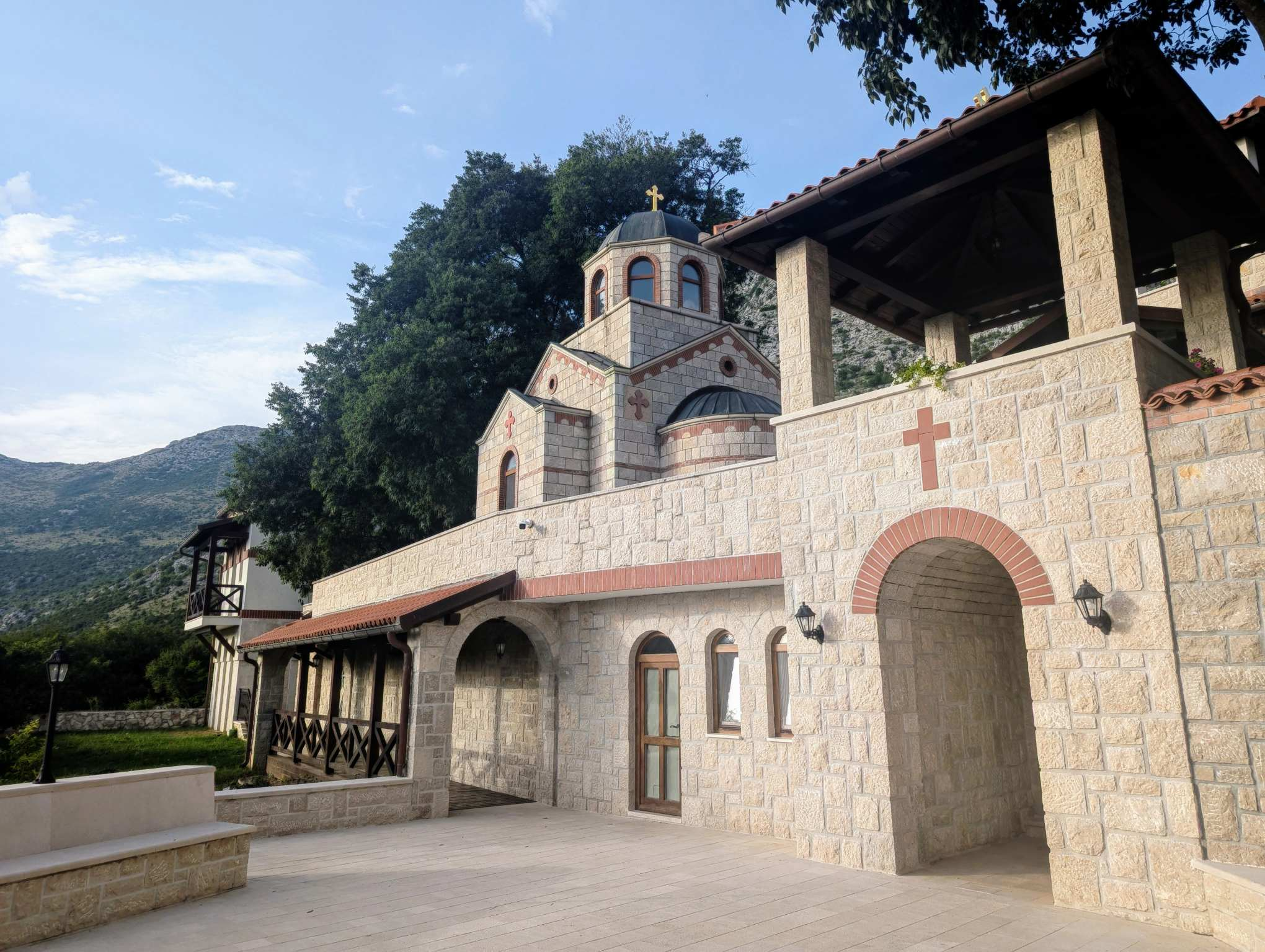
Mrkonjići Monastery

Mrkonjići (Serbian Cyrillic: Мркоњићи) is a village in the municipality of Trebinje, Republika Srpska, Bosnia and Herzegovina.

In this village Basil of Ostrog was born as Stojan Jovanović in 1610. At a young age, he entered the nearby Zavala Monastery, from where he continued to Tvrdoš Monastery, and to various centers of the Orthodox Church around the world. At the site of his birth house, a church was built in the 1990s and later expanded into Mrkonjići Monastery. Its annual celebration of St Vasilije on May 12 brings numerous visitors to the village.
