= Mowing on Kupres =

Grass mowing Strljanica
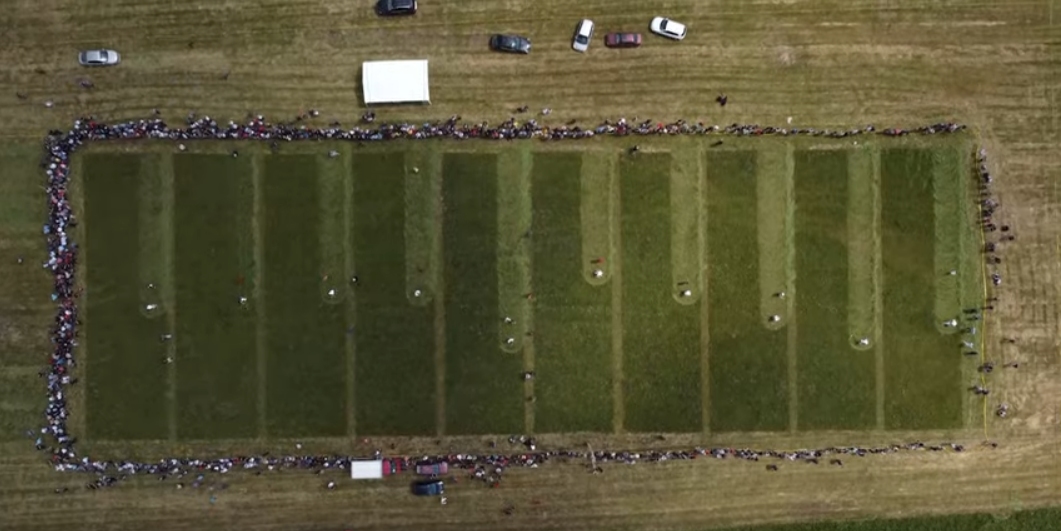
- Date: July
- Frequency: Annual
- Locations: Kupres, Bosnia and Herzegovina
- Inaugurated: 1687

Grass mowing competition custom in Kupres
- UNESCO Intangible Cultural Heritage
- Country: Bosnia and Herzegovina
- Reference: 01512
- Region: Europe and North America

Inscription history
- Inscription: 2020 (15th session)
- List: Representative

Mowing on Kupres or Mowing on Strljanica (which is the local name for the custom) is an annual mowing competition that takes place in July on the specific meadow of Strljanica, the lowest part of Kupres polje, a large karstic polje surrounding town of Kupres, Bosnia and Herzegovina. It is assumed that it has been held since 1687. All the country's ethnic and religious groups and individuals are free to participate, which makes the custom to be considered the basis of the cultural identity of the region, regardless of people's origins. The participants themselves and the Association of Mowers Kupres are credited and most responsible for preserving the tradition.

Days of Mowing in Kupres are a traditional Kupres manifestation in the first week of July. In addition to mowing, competitions are also held in shoulder throwing, horse racing, long jump, tug-of-war and other traditional sports. As part of the Days of Mowing, the International Folklore Festival is held, which is regularly visited by folklore groups from the entire region.

Cutting grass at that height requires strength and a special technique. The competition involves mowing the grass manually with a scythe, and is judged by time, effort and amount of grass mowed. The three best mowers are recognized, and the main mower (kosbaša, kolibaša) is treated as a leader who ensures the successful mowing of all fields to collect hay for livestock. In Kupres, being a kosbaša was the greatest honor and prestige, until the middle of the 20th century, and for some time after that. Hay was necessary to feed livestock in the long and harsh winters of Kupres, so cutting and storing hay was the most important and crucial activity for survival.

Men, starting at the age of eighteen, are traditionally competitors, and the tradition is passed down from father to son within the family. Women rake grass and prepare food for guests. Other elements related to the competition are folk costumes, hair forging and preparation of cattle for the competition.

At the 15th session of the Intergovernmental Commission for the Preservation of Intangible Heritage in 2020 (15.COM), thanks to its characteristics and specifics, Kosidba na Kupresu was inscribed on UNESCO's representative list of intangible world heritage as the fourth on that list.

== See also ==
- Zmijanje embroidery
