= Viduzia =

Chain of mountains in Eastern Herzegovina

Viduzia (or, in its current form; Vidusa) is a chain of mountains in Eastern Herzegovina (In Bosnia), North of Popovo Polje roughly between the little cities of Stolac and Trebinje.

== History ==
Viduzia has been inhabited since ancient times. It was a boundary between two Illyrian Tribes, inhabited by Docleatae and Pleraei. After the down fall of Illyrian kingdoms, Roman Settlers from the nearby town of Travunia (Today's; Trebinje), moved in and established homesteads and farms.

Later on, as Roman Rule decreased, autonomous regions started to form in the Balkans. In the 10th century the highlands were added to Travunia, which at that time was still largely untouched by Slavic invasions. By 968, Croatian King Krešimir exiled his son, Prince Leghec to Trebinje, where he fell in love with Lovizzia, a court maid that gave him seven sons. Leghec raised a rebellion of the people and created a vassalage of the Croatian Kingdom, but the Croatian occupation was expelled and dynastic control re-established with the help of Ragusa subsequently with Boleslav's son Sylvester; who ruled justly.

Perhaps; Ragusa (with an overwhelming Romanised population), felt threatened by Croatian Expansion. After all, Croatians, like many other Slavic tribes, only converted to Christianity in name, and were still known as pirates, and invaders. Or perhaps, Ragusa wanted to expand themselves.

In any case, by the 14th century, Ragusa had made its name by expanding well, right along the coast, while Travunia got swallowed by the long awaited Slavic invasions.

For the proceeding five centuries, Viduzia stayed isolated, as the local inhabitants slowly started drifting south-westwards, into the Peljesac Peninsula, and finally (during the Ottoman invasions) into the Island of Korcula and beyond.

== Geography ==
Its terrain is dotted with ancient church ruins and fortifications, starting from around 200 BC onward.

== Climate ==
The climate of Viduzia is typically Mediterranean, warm and dry. However, the legendary bora is a strong, cold wind from the north that occurs mostly in the winter and spring. The higher regions of Vudizia get snow in winter. The temperature can be as high as 44 °C.

The climate in Viduzia results from the combination of three factors:

- high annual daylight hours

- limited precipitation (snow, rain, etc.); in winter the wind drives out the clouds after short but intense downpours.

- dry weather (the area could have dryness one month and rain the following, but still have significant dryness overall)
