= Veličani =

Veličani Величани
- Village
- Location within Bosnia and Herzegovina
- Coordinates: 42°52′N 18°01′E
- Country: Bosnia and Herzegovina
- Entity: Republika Srpska
- Municipality: Trebinje
- Time zone: UTC+1 (CET)
  - Summer (DST): UTC+2 (CEST)

Veličani (Serbian Cyrillic: Величани) is a village in the municipality of Trebinje, Republika Srpska, southern Bosnia and Herzegovina. It is located in the Popovo field. The village is inhabited by ethnic Serbs, and home to the Church of St. Archangel Michael.
