= Konjic woodcarving =

- UNESCO Intangible Cultural Heritage
- Country: Bosnia and Herzegovina
- Reference: 01288
- Region: Europe and North America

Inscription history
- Inscription: 2017 (12th session)
- List: Representative

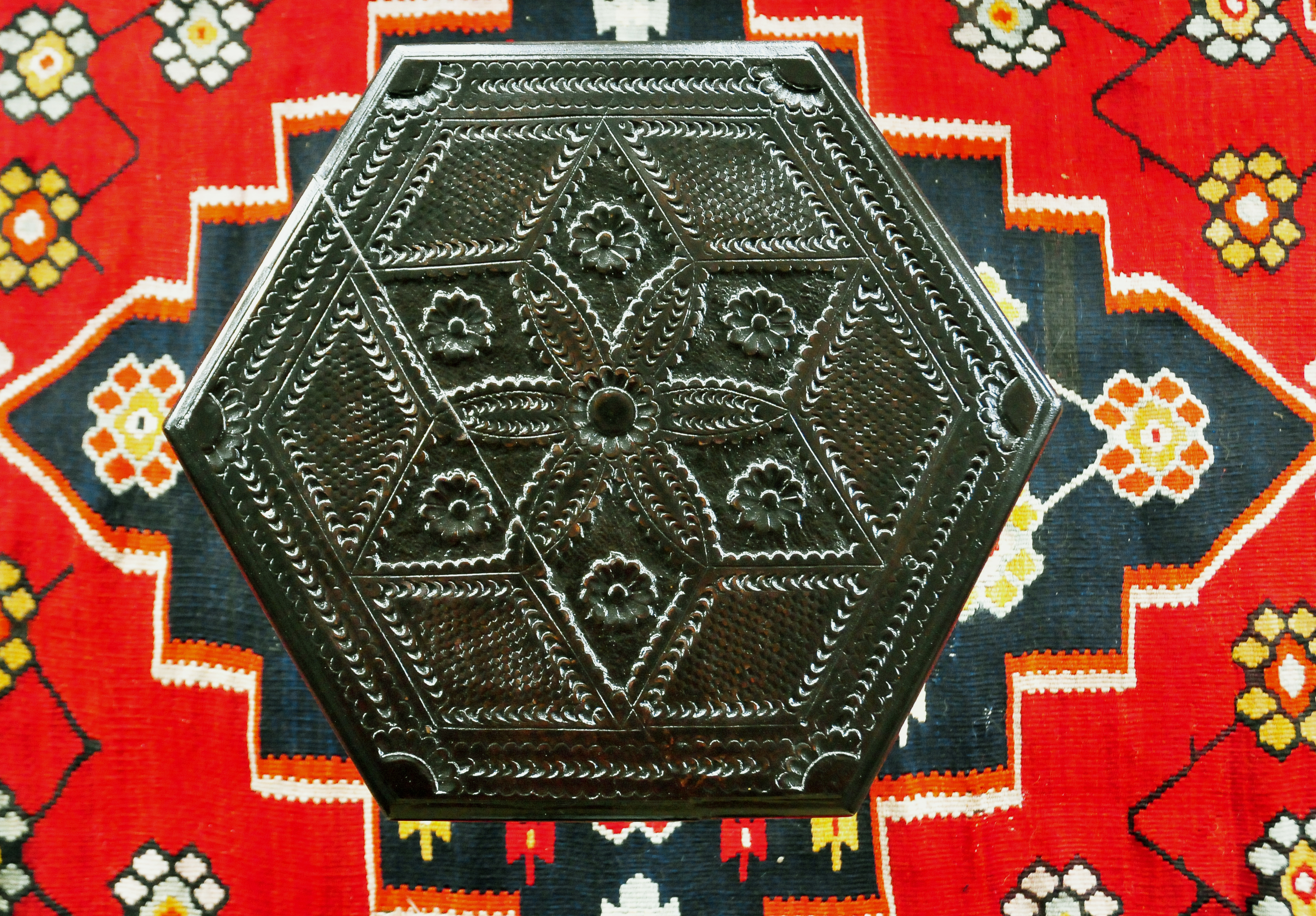
Wood carved table from above, Bosnian House in Mostar

Konjic woodcarving (Bosnian: Konjičko drvorezbarstvo / Коњичко дрворезбарство) is a specific technique of woodcarving practised in Konjic Municipality in Bosnia and Herzegovina.

In 2017 it is included on the UNESCO Representative List of the Intangible Cultural Heritage of Humanity.

== History ==
Konjic woodcarving is a traditional artistic craft with a long history in the municipality of Konjic, Bosnia and Herzegovina. It encompasses handcrafted furniture, elaborate interior designs and small decorative objects, distinguished by intricate hand-carved patterns and a distinctive artistic style.

Konjic woodcarving holds cultural and social significance. It is a part of the local community’s heritage, reflecting the artistry and character of Bosnian home interiors while preserving traditional craftsmanship. Passed down through generations, this art form benefits community bonds and fosters a shared sense of identity, belonging and pride in local cultural heritage.

== See also ==
- List of World Heritage Sites in Bosnia and Herzegovina
