= Basil of Ostrog =

Serbian Orthodox bishop and saint

Saint Basil of Ostrog
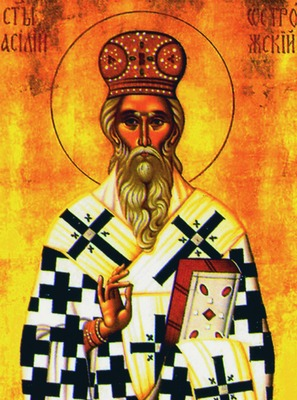
- Icon of Saint Basil of Ostrog

Bishop of Zahumlje and Herzegovina, the Wonderworker
- Born: 28 December 1610; Mrkonjići, Herzegovina, Ottoman Empire
- Died: 29 April 1671 (aged 60); Ostrog Monastery
- Venerated in: Eastern Orthodox Church
- Major shrine: Ostrog Monastery
- Feast: 12 May (O.S. 29 April)

Basil of Ostrog (Serbian: Свети Василије Острошки, romanized: Sveti Vasilije Ostroški, pronounced [sʋê:ti ʋǎsiːlije ǒstroʃki]; 28 December 1610 – 29 April 1671), also known as Vasilije, was a Serbian Orthodox bishop of Zahumlje who is venerated as a saint in the Eastern Orthodox Church.

== Life ==
=== Early life ===
Stojan Jovanović (Serbian Cyrillic: Стојан Јовановић) was born on 28 December 1610, in the village of Mrkonjići at the Popovo field in the Ljubinje nahija (Herzegovina), at the time part of the Ottoman Empire. His father was Petar Jovanović and his mother was Ana. Legends about him describe him as a diligent and obedient child, saying he inherited his graciousness and benevolence from his parents.

Having raised cattle on the Herzegovinian hills and mountain slopes, he shared all of his food with poorer people. The Ottomans started to notice him and his parents took him to the nearby Zavala Monastery, where his paternal uncle, the hieromonk Serafim served as the hegumen of the monastery. There, he would study and be protected.

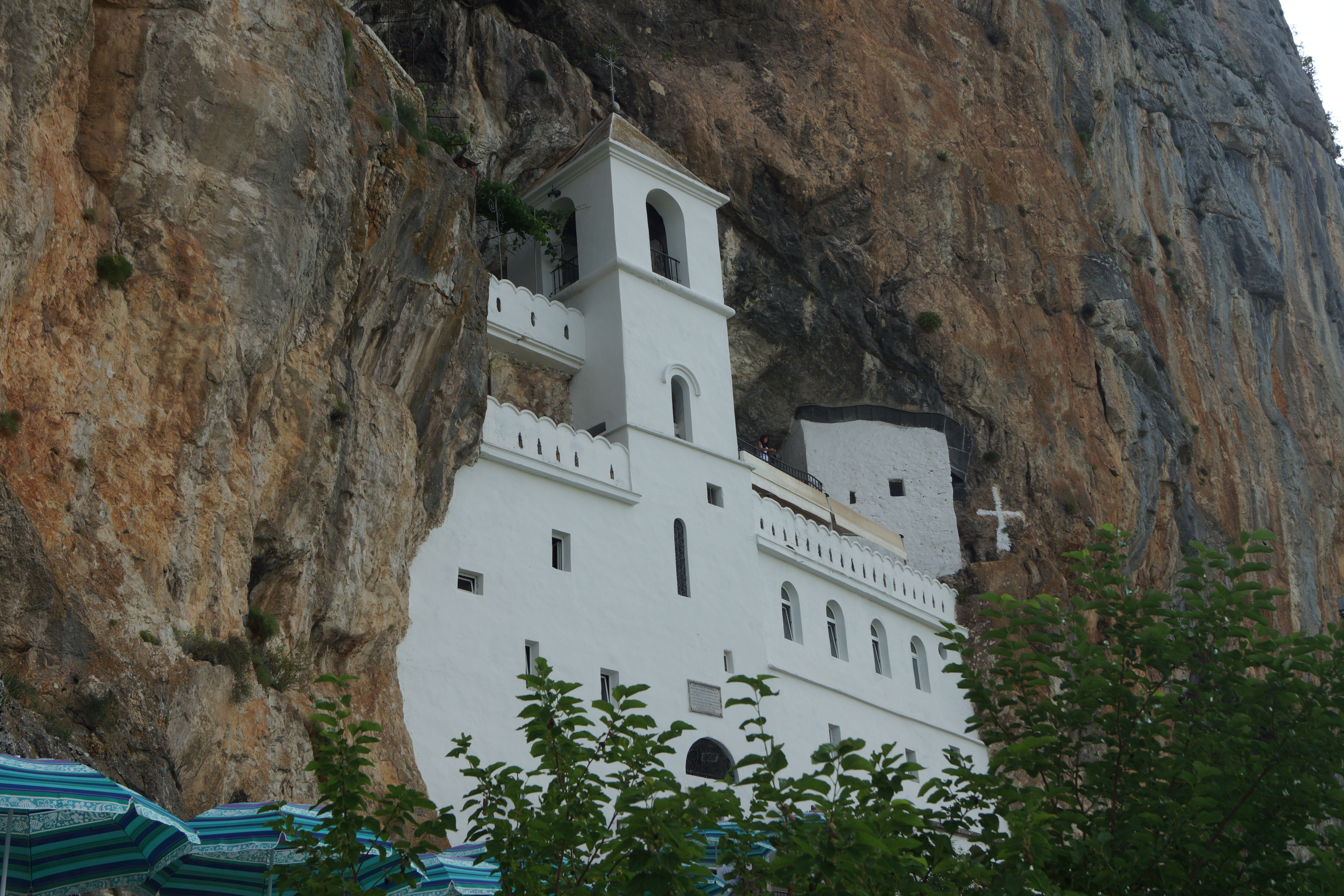
Ostrog Monastery in Bjelopavlići

=== Studies ===
At that time, the monastery had a large library at the monastery church of the Presentation of the Blessed Virgin Mary. He quickly became a master of the Bible and basic Christian mysteries. After a while, his uncle sent him to the Monastery of the Most Holy Mother of God, the Tvrdoš Monastery in Trebinje, for further spiritual and theological studies.

=== Bishop of Zahumlje ===
St. Basil's modesty made him reluctant to occupy high positions. However, his dedication to the Church led to his election as Bishop of Zahumlje and Skenderija in 1639. He retired from the position in 1649.

== Legacy ==
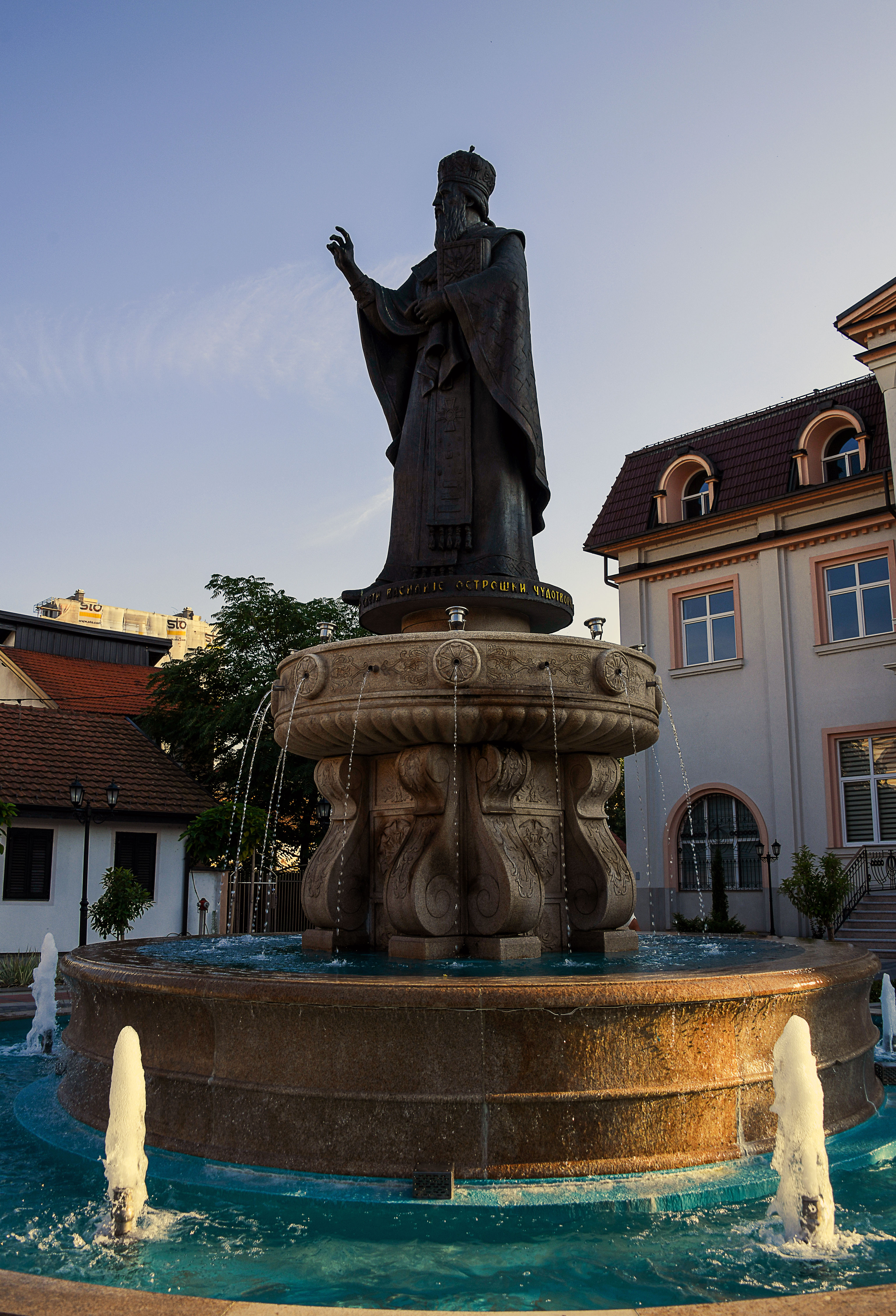
Monastery of St. Basil of Ostrog in Bijeljina

After his death in 1671, he was buried at the Ostrog Monastery which he had founded in Montenegro. His tomb in a cave-church soon became a site of pilgrimage for Christians (both Orthodox and Roman Catholic) and Muslims who were drawn by reports of miracles occurring through the intercession of the saint. The Monastery is now one of the major pilgrimage sites in the Balkans, and large numbers of pilgrims gather, particularly at Pentecost. St. Basil of Ostrog is commemorated in the Serbian orthodox liturgical calendar on April 29 (May 12 in the Gregorian Calendar).

In Montenegro, St. Basil of Ostrog is considered as one of the highest saints. Some Eastern Orthodox priests in Montenegro joke that Montenegrins would pray to Saint Basil before God. The respect given to Saint Basil was also demonstrated during the 2019–2020 clerical protests in Montenegro, during which protestors carried icons of Saint Basil. Significant protests were held around the Church of St. Basil in Nikšić. Some have even credited the veneration of Saint Basil with those protests and the political upheaval that followed. Following the 2020 Montenegrin parliamentary election, Zdravko Krivokapić, leader of the opposition, mentioned Saint Basil in his victory speech, saying that it was the expected result for "those who strike against God and Saint Basil of Ostrog."

The Orthodox seminary in East Sarajevo (Pravoslavni bogoslovski fakultet Sveti Vasilije Ostroški), part of the University of East Sarajevo, is named after him.

A church in Nalježići, in the Grbalj region is also named after him.

Vladimir Kecmanović wrote the poem Ognjen i kelija (2024), inspired by the life of Basil of Ostrog.

== See also ==
- List of Serbian saints
