= Vjetrenica Cave =

Largest cave in Bosnia and Herzegovina

- Wind Cave, Blowhole Cave
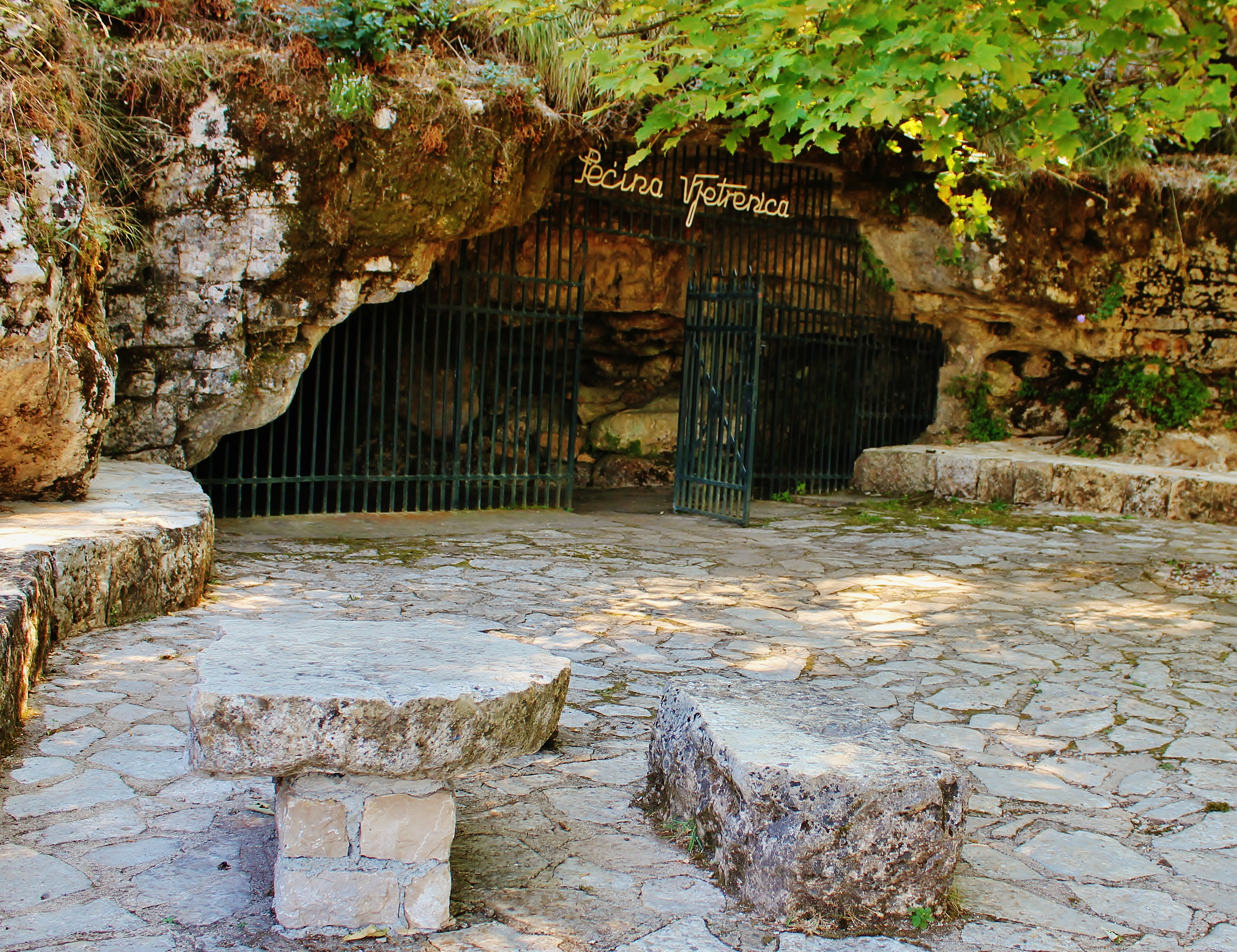
- Cave entrance

- Location within Bosnia and Herzegovina
- Interactive map of Vjetrenica Cave
- Location: Ravno, Bosnia and Herzegovina
- Coordinates: 42°50′45″N 17°59′02″E
- Length: 7,014 m (23,012 ft)
- Geology: Karst cave
- Show cave opened: yes
- Translation: Windy cave or blowhole (Serbo-Croatian)
- Pronunciation: pronounced [ʋjɛtrɛ̌nitsa]
- Website: www.centarzakrs.ba

UNESCO World Heritage Site
- Official name: Vjetrenica Cave, Ravno
- Criteria: x
- Designated: 2024 (46st session)
- Reference no.: 1673
- Region: Europe and North America

Vjetrenica (Serbian Cyrillic: Вјетреница, pronounced [ʋjɛtrɛ̌nitsa]; lit. 'wind cave' or 'blowhole') is the largest cave in Bosnia and Herzegovina, and the most biodiverse cave in the world. It is part of the Dinaric Alps mountain range, which is known for its karstic and speleological features. The cave is located in the Popovo field in Ravno, East Herzegovina in the Federation of Bosnia and Herzegovina.

== Geography ==
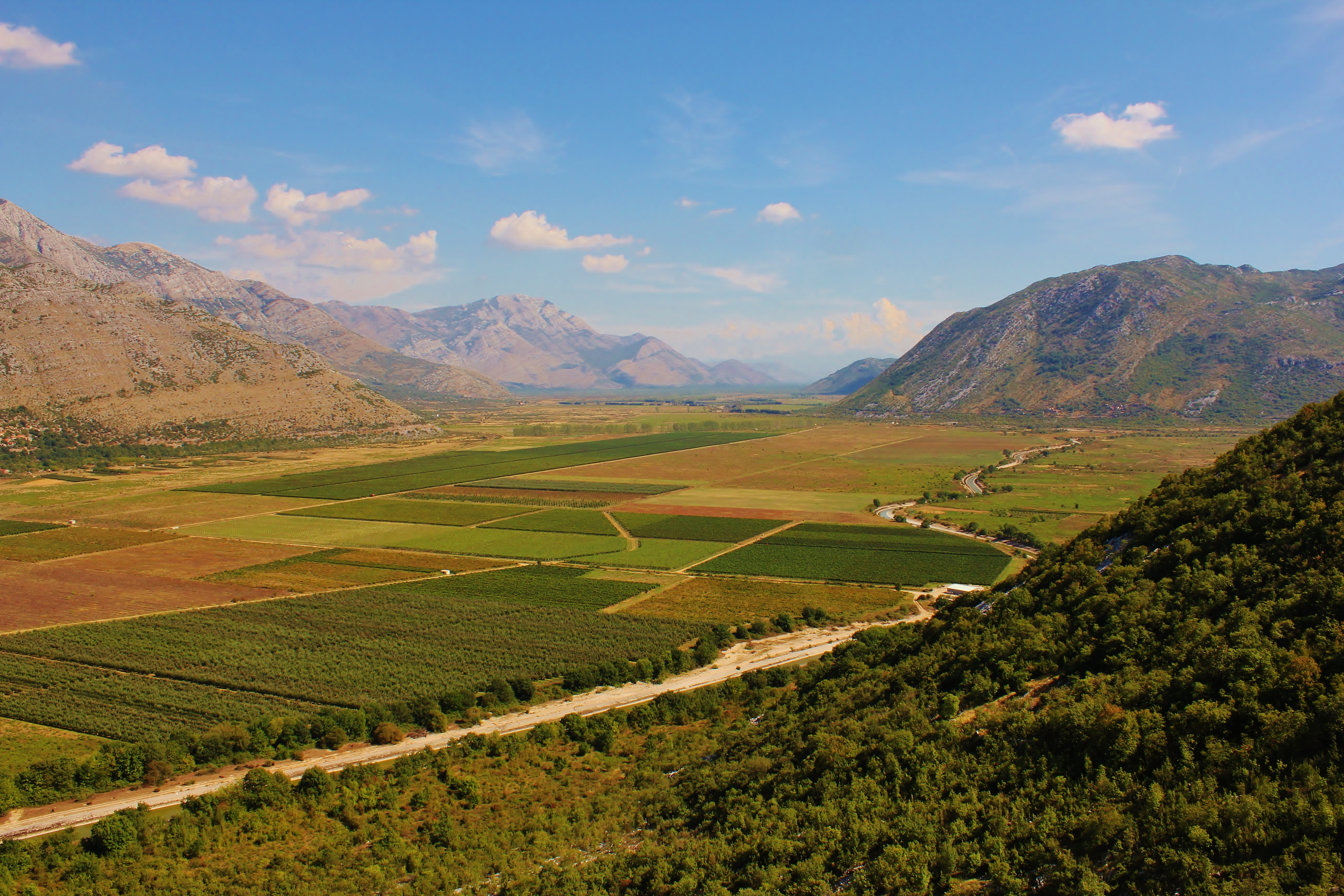
Popovo Polje, Bosnia and Herzegovina

=== Popovo Polje and cave location ===
Vjetrenica is located in Popovo Polje (pronounced [pɔ̌pɔʋɔ pɔ̂ʎɛ], meaning priest's field, where polje means a karstic plain), which is itself located in the southernmost regions of Bosnia and Herzegovina, West Herzegovina, near the Adriatic coast.

Its entrance is near the village of Zavala, in the west south-western corner of the polje. During the warmer parts of the year, a strong blast of cold air blows from its entrance, which is very attractive in the middle of the rocky, hot and waterless terrain.

Popovo Polje is one of the largest polje (karstic plains) in Bosnia and Herzegovina and the world, famous for its many karstic phenomena and features, and particularly for its Trebišnjica River, which flows through the polje as the largest sinking river (also losing stream, or influent stream) in the world, as well as the Vjetrenica cave system, located to the west/south-western parts of the valley.

The cave has been explored and described to a total distance of 7,014 m; of this the main channel is about 2.47 km long. It runs from the edge of Popovo Polje to the south, and on the basis of analysis of the terrain, geologists have predicted that Vjetrenica could stretch right to the Adriatic Sea in the Republic of Croatia, 15–20 km away from its entrance. Along with the hydrological arguments, this assumption is also supported by the "unnatural" end of Vjetrenica in the form of a huge heap of stone blocks that have caved in.

Vjetrenica is the richest cave in the world in terms of subterranean biodiversity: among more than two hundred different species are registered in it, almost a hundred are troglophiles, a great number of them are narrow endemic, 15 are stenoendemic, and about 37 were discovered and described in Vjetrenica for the first time.

== Natural and architectural assemble ==
=== Zavala Village ===
Located in Popovo Polje in Ravno municipality, village Zavala with its old architecture and stone masonry, together with Vjetrenica cave, constitute the natural and architectural ensemble, which is in the process of being protected as National Monument of Bosnia and Herzegovina, and as such it is already placed on UNESCO Tentative List.

Vjetrenica cave is considered to have richest cave fauna, with highest rate of endemism. Vjetrenica cave also acquired fame throughout the world geological and biological scientific communities, as well as environmental communities around the country and the world for its imperiled and uncertain future, caused by unprofessional management lacking any expertise, and uncertain status at state and especially local level.

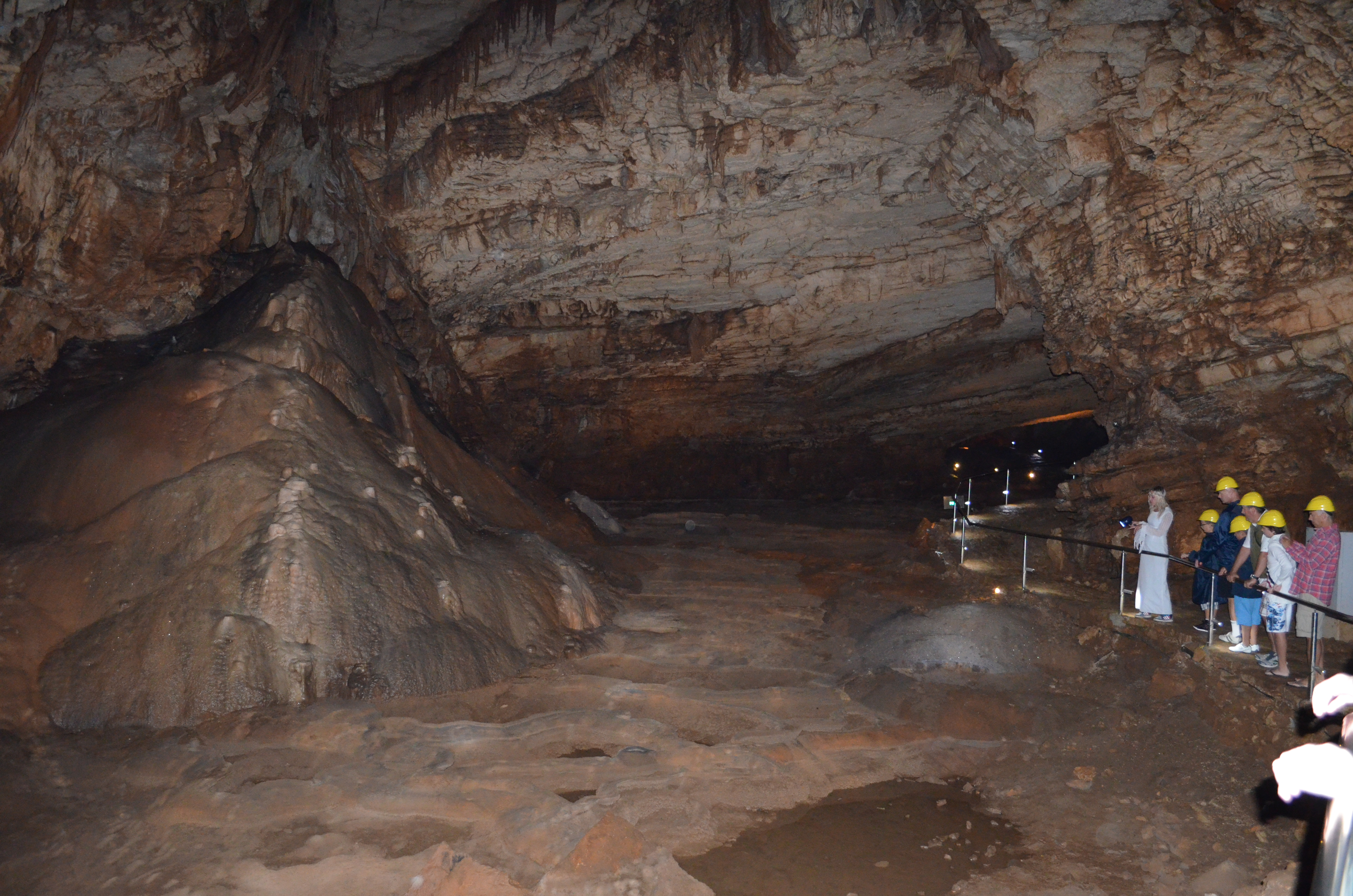
Inside Vjetrenica cave

=== UNESCO nomination ===
Despite all setbacks, the government of Bosnia and Herzegovina, although creepingly slowly, nominated Vjeternica (with village Zavala) to UNESCO Tentative List clearly expressing intention to protect the cave and its biodiversity and eventually inscribe it with UNESCO.

In 2024, the Vjetrenica Cave was designated a UNESCO World Heritage Site during the 46th session of the UNESCO World Heritage Committee.

== See also ==
- List of caves in Bosnia and Herzegovina
- List of longest Dinaric caves
- Livanjsko field
- Trebišnjica
- Saint Basil of Ostrog
