= List of karst polje in Bosnia and Herzegovina =

The following list consists of Dinaric karst fields or polje(s) in Bosnia and Herzegovina:

== Poljes (fields) ==
Western Bosnia:

- Livanjsko Polje
- Duvanjsko Polje
- Kupreško Polje
- Drvarsko polje
- Glamočko Polje
- Grahovsko Polje
- Medno Polje, Bosanski Petrovac

Western Herzegovina:

- Imotsko Polje
- Ljubuško Polje

Eastern Bosnia:

- Dobro Polje

Eastern Herzegovina:

- Nevesinjsko Polje
- Gatačko Polje
- Fatničko Polje
- Dabarsko Polje
- Ljubinsko Polje
- Ljubomir Polje
- Popovo Polje
