= Commission to Preserve National Monuments of Bosnia and Herzegovina =

Government agency of national monuments

Commission to preserve national monuments of Bosnia and Herzegovina
- Komisija za očuvanje nacionalnih spomenika Bosne i Hercegovine
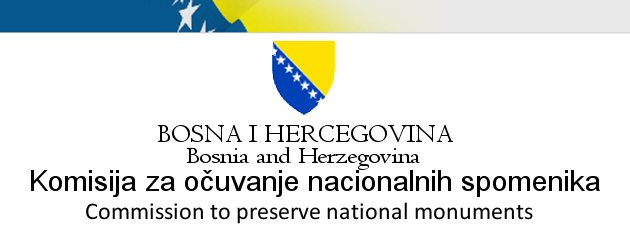
- Logo of the KONS (CPNM)

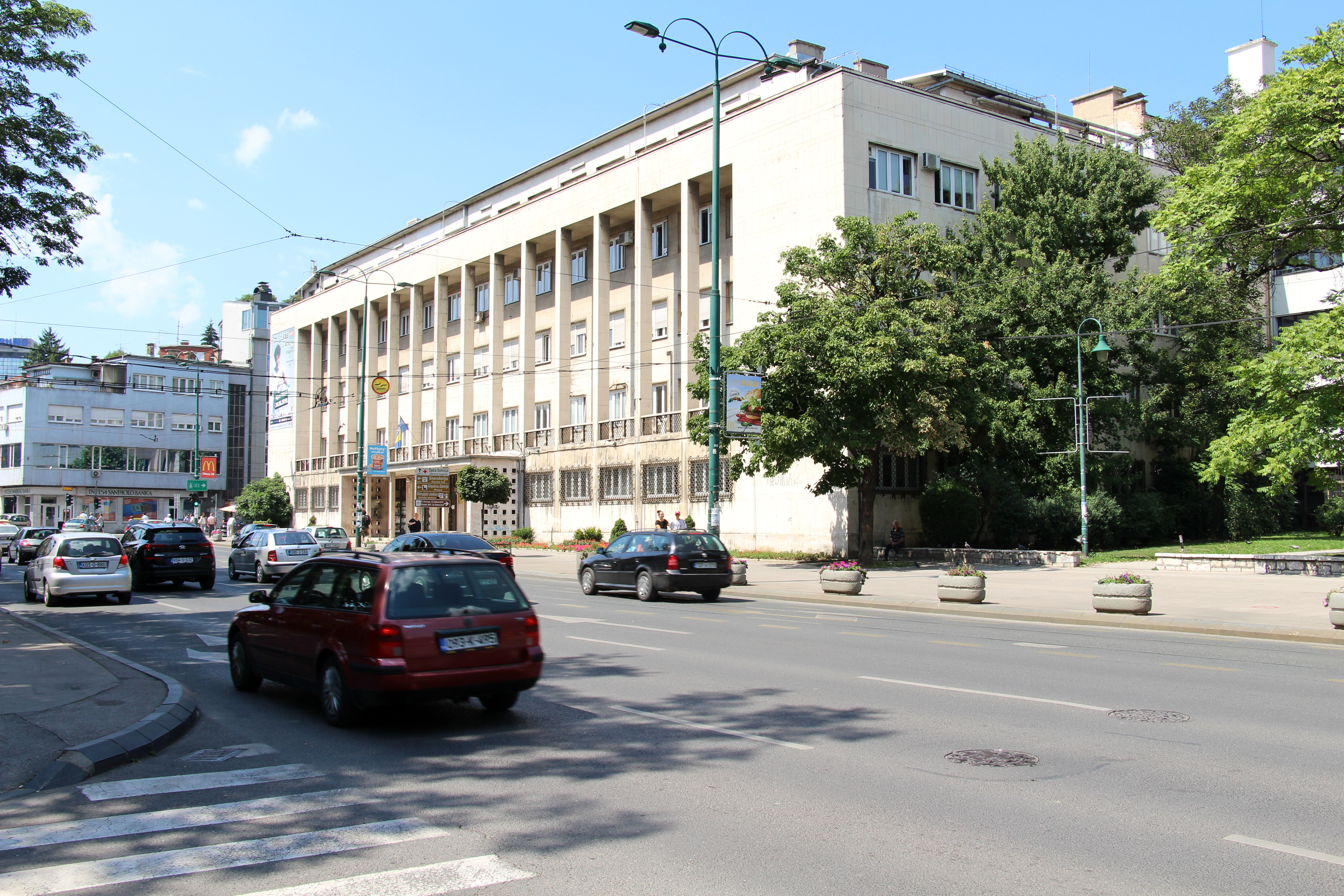
- Former Higijenski zavod building, now Ministry of Health of the Federation of BiH, where the KONS is located - entrance from the park beyond the right edge of the image

Commission overview
- Formed: December 21, 2001
- Jurisdiction: Council of Ministers of Bosnia and Herzegovina
- Headquarters: Maršala Tita 9A/1 Sarajevo, Bosnia and Herzegovina; 43°51′32.9″N 18°24′46.6″E
- Annual budget: €0 (2016)
- Commission executives: Anđelina Ošap-Gaćanović, Commissioner and current chairperson; Faruk Kapidžić, Deputy Commissioner; Zoran Mikulić, Deputy Commissioner
- Parent department: Council of Ministers of Bosnia and Herzegovina
- Child Commission: Entity agencies
- Key documents: Annex 8 of the General Framework Agreement for Peace in Bosnia and Herzegovina; Act of the Presidency of Bosnia and Herzegovina
- Website: KONS (new website); Old KONS (old website used as an archive)

The Commission to Preserve National Monuments of Bosnia and Herzegovina, abbr. KONS (Bosnian: Komisija za očuvanje nacionalnih spomenika Bosne i Hercegovine), is Bosnia and Herzegovina commission (agency) which declares and registers national heritage monuments/sites, including natural/urban/architectural assembles, immovable and movable heritage of historical and cultural importance to Bosnia and Herzegovina, as an institution at state level. The sites of exclusively natural heritage are not subject of Annex 8 and the KONS.

== Background and history ==
In the period from the end of World War II to the declaration of independence of Bosnia and Herzegovina form former Yugoslavia in 1992, protected cultural and natural assets were declared based on following legal acts:

- the Law on the Protection of Cultural Monuments and Natural Rarities (Official Gazette of the People's Republic of Bosnia and Herzegovina No. 19/1947),
- the Law on Nature Protection (Official Gazette of the Republic of Bosnia and Herzegovina No. 4/1965),
- the Law on the Protection and Use of Cultural, Historical and Natural Heritage (Official Gazette of the Republic of Bosnia and Herzegovina No. 20/1985 and 12/1987).

Decisions on the protection of cultural assets and natural areas were made by the State Institute for the Protection of Cultural Monuments and Natural Rarities from Sarajevo (Državni zavod za zaštitu spomenika kulture i prirodnih rijetkosti, Sarajevo), later renamed as the Institute for the Protection of Cultural Monuments of Bosnia and Herzegovina (Zavod za zaštitu spomenika kulture Bosne i Hercegovine). The laws on the declaration of Sutjeska and Kozara as national parks, NP Sutjeska and NP Kozara, were passed by the Assembly of the Socialist Republic of Bosnia and Herzegovina.

On 23 July 1945, immediately after the World War II, the Law on the Protection of Cultural Monuments and Natural Rarities was passed, which was amended and supplemented the following year (published in the Official Gazette of the FNRJ on 8 October 1946) as the General Law on the Protection of Cultural Monuments and Natural Rarities. Within the framework of this general law, the Law on the Protection of Cultural Monuments and Natural Rarities of Bosnia and Herzegovina was also passed (published in the Official Gazette of the People's Republic of Bosnia and Herzegovina No. 18/1947 of 30 April 1947). In accordance with the Law of 23 July 1945, by decision of the Ministry of Education of the Peoples' Government of BiH No. 4977 of 19 September 1945, the Land's Institute for the Protection and Scientific Study of Cultural Monuments and Natural Rarities of Bosnia and Herzegovina was established at the Land's Museum of Bosnia and Herzegovina in Sarajevo. By a later decision of the same Ministry, number 3115 of 26 February 1946, two separate bodies were established at the National Museum, namely the National Institute for the Protection of Cultural Monuments of the People's Republic of Bosnia and Herzegovina and the National Institute for the Protection of Nature of the People's Republic of Bosnia and Herzegovina.

== Establishment and legal scope ==
In accordance with Annex 8 of Dayton Agreement and Act concerning the Commission to Preserve National Monuments of Bosnia and Herzegovina passed by Presidency of Bosnia and Herzegovina on December 21, 2001, KONS is an institution at state level which declares and registers national heritage monuments/sites, including natural/urban/architectural assembles, immovable and movable heritage of historical and cultural importance to Bosnia and Herzegovina. The act states that The Commission to Preserve National Monuments of Bosnia and Herzegovina is established pursuant to Annex 8 of the General Framework Agreement for Peace in Bosnia and Herzegovina, and establishes basic principles and objectives of the Commission activities, as well as its primary tasks and authorizations as Bosnia and Herzegovina institution.
Act was issued by Official Gazette of Bosnia and Herzegovina (Bosnian: Službeni glasnik BiH), No. 1/02 i 10/02, and Official Gazette of the Federation of Bosnia and Herzegovina No. 2/02, 27/02 and 6/04.

For declaration of the property to be the national monuments, property and political criterion are not of special importance. However, since 2016 three native members of the Commission are picked on the basis of their ethnicity (Bosniak, Croat and Serb), and regardless of their prior or current political engagements, which could prove to be controversial.

=== Regulation of conduct and procedures ===
Regulation of conduct and procedures in a framework of the Commission to Preserve National Monuments of Bosnia and Herzegovina are as stipulated in most recent Act of the Presidency of Bosnia and Herzegovina, from May 26, 2016 - under principal provisions, methodology, procedures, cooperation with institutions and official bodies, transparency, and final articles.

== Commissioners ==
At the 119th session of the Presidency of Bosnia and Herzegovina, held on 21 December 2001, the first members of the commission for period 2002 to February 2016 were elected, which was subsequently changed into 5 year mandate, while posts of the chairperson and deputies are switched during the mandate on rotation basis.

First members of the commission for the period 2002 to February 2016 were:

- Dubravko Lovrenović, (Ph.D., Professor of history at University of Sarajevo);
- Amra Hadžimuhamedović;
- Ljiljana Ševo;
- Tina Wik, (until June 2008);
- Zeynep Ahunbay, (Turkey);
- Martin Cherry, (UK);
- András J. Riedlmayer, (Bibliographer in Islamic Art and Architecture in Fine Arts Library at Harvard University, US).

Members of the commission for the period February 2016 to 2021 were:

- Amir Pašić, Ph.D., Professor of architecture;
- Radoje Vidović, Professor of history and geography;
- Goran Milojević, Architect .

Current members of the commission from 2021 are:

- Anđelina Ošap-Gaćanović, Mr. engineer of architecture, graduated at the Faculty of Architecture and Civil Engineering of the University of Banja Luka, and master of monument restoration at the Polytechnic University of Catalonia in Barcelona;
- Faruk Kapidžić, engineer of architecture, graduated at the Faculty of Architecture of the University of Sarajevo;
- Zoran Mikulić, graduated at the Faculty of Law of the University Džemal Bijedić of Mostar, completed the bar examination, and the Legal Practice Course.

== Internal organization of the Commission (Secretariat) ==
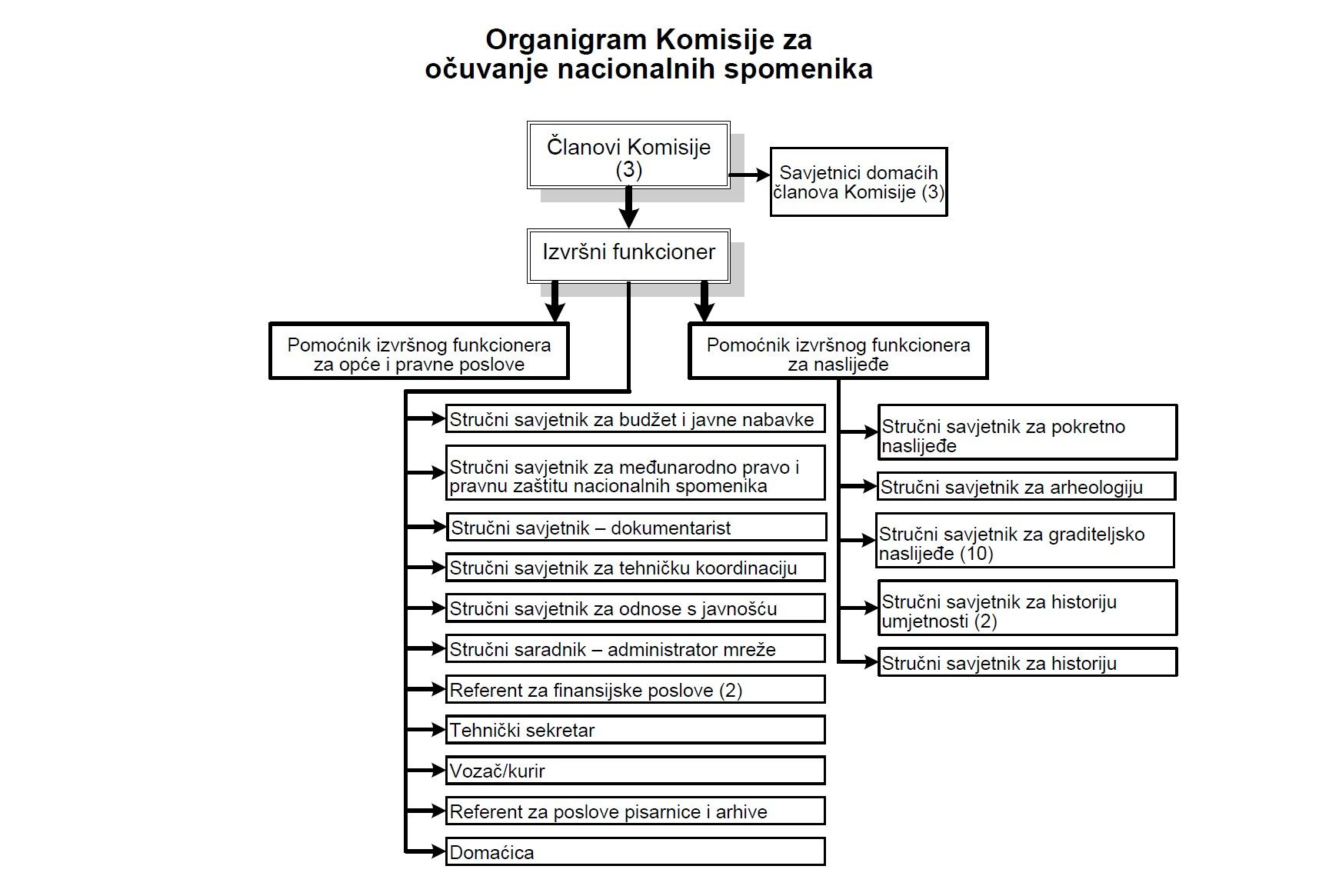
Internal organization and structure

The Secretariat is managed and organized by the Executive officer, and is structured with the Executive officer, the Secretariat of the Commission, and the Associate experts, the Librarian and documentarist, and the Technical secretary, as follows:

The Executive officer

- Executive officer

The Secretariat of the Commission, consists of:

- Executive officer
- Assistant to the executive officer for the heritage
- Assistant to the executive officer for legal affairs
- Advisor for technical coordination (chief of staff)

The Associate experts consists of:

- Associates for architectural heritage monuments
- Associates for architectural heritage ensembles and cultural landscapes
- Associate for archaeology
- Associate for the implementation of the World Heritage Convention
- Art historian associate
- Budget and public procurements associate
- Finance associate
- International law associate
- Public relations associate

The Librarian and documentarist

The Technical secretary.

== Procedures and scope ==
The Rules of Procedure regulate the modus operandi of the Commission to Preserve National Monuments, including internal dynamics and the decision-making process of Proceedings. The set of rules and guidelines was established by the Commission to Preserve National Monuments, at the session held between 7 and 11 May 2002.

=== Proceedings before the Commission ===
==== Petitions ====
Article 35 stipulates that a petition for the designation of property as a national monument needs to be submitted to the Commission.

The petition have a format determined by the Commission according to the type of property and is published in the official gazettes of Bosnia and Herzegovina, both entities and District Brčko.

The List of Petitions for Designation of Properties as National Monuments is created through submission of the petitions.

==== Designation ====
Designation of property as a national monument is a process of decision making in which the Commission takes into account previous designation, research documents. Before making the final decision the Commission also takes into account the views of the petitioner, the institutions in charge of protection, experts, scientist and scientific institutions, and other interested persons and entities.

=== Tentative List of National Monuments of B&H ===
Unlike KONS Petition List, which represents comprehensive database of all petitions on properties and sites, filed by individuals and/or organisations, to be declared national monuments via KONS procedures, KONS Tentative List concerns properties and sites already declared national monuments by earlier state parties (agencies) during SR BiH, prior to declaration of independence from SFR Yugoslavia, and before establishment of KONS through Annex 8 of the General Framework Agreement for Peace in Bosnia and Herzegovina.

The Tentative List, or formally the Provisional List of National Monuments of Bosnia and Herzegovina (Official Gazette of BiH no. 33/02), was drawn up by the previous complement of the Commission. Art.2 of the Law on the Implementation of the Decisions of the Commission to Preserve National Monuments, established pursuant to Annex 8 of the General Framework Agreement for Peace in BiH (Official Gazette of the Federation of BiH nos. 2/02 and 27/02), stipulates that all properties on the Provisional List are to be regarded as national monuments until the Commission adopts a final decision. All final decisions of the Commission are published in the official gazettes of Bosnia and Herzegovina, including those of entities and Brčko District. Once final decisions have been adopted for all the properties on the Provisional List, the List will be abolished.

=== Heritage at Risk ===
Monuments at Risk In Bosnia and Herzegovina is a list of designated monuments at risk from illicit building, inexpert reconstruction, lack of maintenance and other hazards. The Commission monitors and reviews the state and activities relating to national monuments at risk.

== Criteria to designate the properties as National Monuments ==
The Commission to Preserve National Monuments declares legal protection of the property to be the national monument on the ground of criteria based on subject, scope and value of each property.

=== I. Subjects of legal protection ===
==== A. Portable cultural property ====
Portable cultural property, individual or in collections, classified as follows:

- small objects (home furnishings, clothing, working equipment, tools, handicraft products, etc.)
- paintings,
- books,
- sculptures,
- building fragments,
- inscriptions, etc.

==== B. Immovable cultural property ====
===== 1. Historic buildings and monuments =====
- residential,
- religious,
- educational,
- administrative,
- public,
- commercial,
- infrastructure,
- military,
- hygienic,
- agricultural,
- industrial, etc.

===== 2. Groups of buildings =====
Groups of buildings which are either part of a composition with a certain purpose or an agglomeration which is the result of continuous building in a historic core.

- residential,
- religious,
- educational,
- administrative,
- public,
- commercial,
- infrastructure,
- military,
- hygienic,
- agricultural,
- industrial, etc.

===== 3. Sites =====
- urban,
- rural,
- archaeological,
- historical,
- industrial,
- cultural landscape
- natural site related to some ritual or tradition,
- natural-scientific,
- mixed.

=== II. Value - Criteria for designation ===
Criteria for designation as follows:

==== A. Time frame ====
Properties arisen from the prehistoric times until the end of the 20th century.

==== B. Historic value ====
Association of a building, or group or place to a historic figure in the history or a significant event in the history.

==== C. Artistic and aesthetic value ====
i. Quality of workmanship, ii. Quality of material, iii. Proportions, iv. Composition, v. Value of a detail, vi. Structural value.

==== D. Clarity ====
Documentary, scientific and educational or pedagogic value.

i. Material evidence about less known historic era, ii. Evidence of historic changes, iii. Work of a famous artist or builder, iv. Evidence of certain type, style or regional manner, v. Evidence of a typical lifestyle in the certain era.

==== E. Symbolic value ====
i. Ontology value, ii. Sacral value, iii. Traditional value, iv. Relation to the rituals or traditions, v. Significance for the identity of a group of people.

==== F. Townscape/Landscape value ====
i. Relation of the form in the comparison with other parts of the group, ii. Meaning in the townscape, iii. A building or a group of buildings is a part of a group or site.

==== G. Authenticity ====
i. Form and design, ii. Materials and substance, iii. Use and function, iv. Traditions and techniques, v. Location and setting, vi. Spirit and feeling, and vii. Other internal and external factors.

==== H. Uniqueness/rarity ====
i. The single or rare example of an object type or style, ii. A masterpiece of workmanship or course, iii. Work of a prominent artist/ architect, craftsman.

==== I. Integrity (groups, sites, collections) ====
i. Material wholeness, ii. Homogeneity, iii. Completeness, iv. Unimpaired condition.

== International conventions ==
Bosnia and Herzegovina is a signatory of International conventions and contracts in the field of cultural heritage, such as:

UNESCO

- Hague Convention of 1954 (the Protection of Cultural Property in the Event of Armed Conflict, which include Rulebook, Protocol I, Protocol II);
- Paris Convention of 1970 (the Protection of the World Cultural and Natural Heritage);
- Paris Convention of 1972 (on Means of Prohibiting and Preventing the Illicit Import, Export and Transfer of Ownership of Cultural Property);
- Paris Convention of 2001 (the Protection of the Underwater Cultural Heritage);
- Paris Convention of 2003 (the Protection of Intangible Cultural Heritage);
- Paris Convention of 2005 (the Protection and Promotion of Cultural Diversity).

European Council

- European Cultural Convention1954 (Paris);
- European Convention on the Protection of the Archaeological Heritage 1969 (London), Bosnia and Herzegovina signed the revised Valletta 1992 version in 2009);
- Granada Convention of 1985 (the Protection of the Architectural Heritage of Europe);
- Faro Framework Convention of 2005 (the Value of Cultural Heritage for Society);
- European Landscape Convention (Florence, 2000).

Other bilateral and multilateral

- Berne Convention for the Protection of Literary and Artistic Works from 1886, revised in Paris in 1971, and amended in 1979.
- Agreement between the BiH Council of Ministers and the Government of the United States, the protection and preservation of particular cultural properties signed on 2 July 2002, ratified on 21 July 2004 (in the appendix of the Official Gazette of BiH - International Agreements, no. 6/04)
- Agreement between the BiH Government and the Government of the Federal Republic of Germany, cooperation in culture, education and science, signed on 21 July 2004, ratified on 26 October 2005 (in the appendix of the Official Gazette of BiH - International Agreements, no. 11/05)
- UNIDROIT Convention on the International Return of Stolen or Illegally Exported Cultural Properties (Rome, 1995)
- Rezolution CM/Res (2010) 52 on rules for the award of the “Cultural route of the Council of Europe“ certification (approved by the Council of Ministers on 8 December 2010)
- UNESCO's General Assembly Recommendation concerning the Safeguarding of Beauty and Character of Landscapes and Sites (11 December 1962);
- Vienna Memorandum on World Heritage and contemporary architecture - Managing the historic urban landscape;
- ICOMOS Charter for the interpretation and presentation of cultural heritage, under the auspices of the ICOMOS International Scientific Committee for the interpretation and presentation of cultural heritage, ratified on 4 October 2008 at the 16th General Assembly of ICOMOS, Quebec, Canada.

== Yearbook and Official Gazette ==
=== Yearbook Baština ===
Baština (transl. Heritage), historically Naša baština (Our Heritage), is the official yearbook or the annual of the Commission to Preserve National Monuments of Bosnia and Herzegovina, which publishes scholarly articles in the field of heritage protection, history, history of art, archaeology, architecture and culture. Previous issues of the journal have published mostly on topics of the medieval heritage, such as the medieval stećci tombstones (stećci), and the medieval fortress of Jajce, in particular.

=== Official Gazette of Bosnia and Herzegovina ===
Act to establish commission was issued by Official Gazette of Bosnia and Herzegovina (Bosnian: Službeni glasnik BiH), No. 1/02 i 10/02., and Official Gazette of the Federation of Bosnia and Herzegovina No. 2/02, 27/02 and 6/04/. All later acts and decisions are consequently published also.
Criteria are published in the Official Gazette of BiH and the Official Gazettes of both Entities of Bosnia and Herzegovina and of Brčko District of Bosnia and Herzegovina.

The final decisions of the Commission on designation of monuments are published in the official gazettes of Bosnia and Herzegovina.

== See also ==
- List of heritage registers in Bosnia and Herzegovina
- List of National Monuments of Bosnia and Herzegovina
- List of World Heritage Sites in Bosnia and Herzegovina
- List of fortifications in Bosnia and Herzegovina
- List of bridges in Bosnia and Herzegovina
- List of World War II monuments and memorials in Bosnia and Herzegovina
- List of People's Heroes of Yugoslavia monuments in Bosnia and Herzegovina
- List of museums in Bosnia and Herzegovina
