= Zmijanje embroidery =

Embroidery technique and intangible cultural heritage of Zmijanje

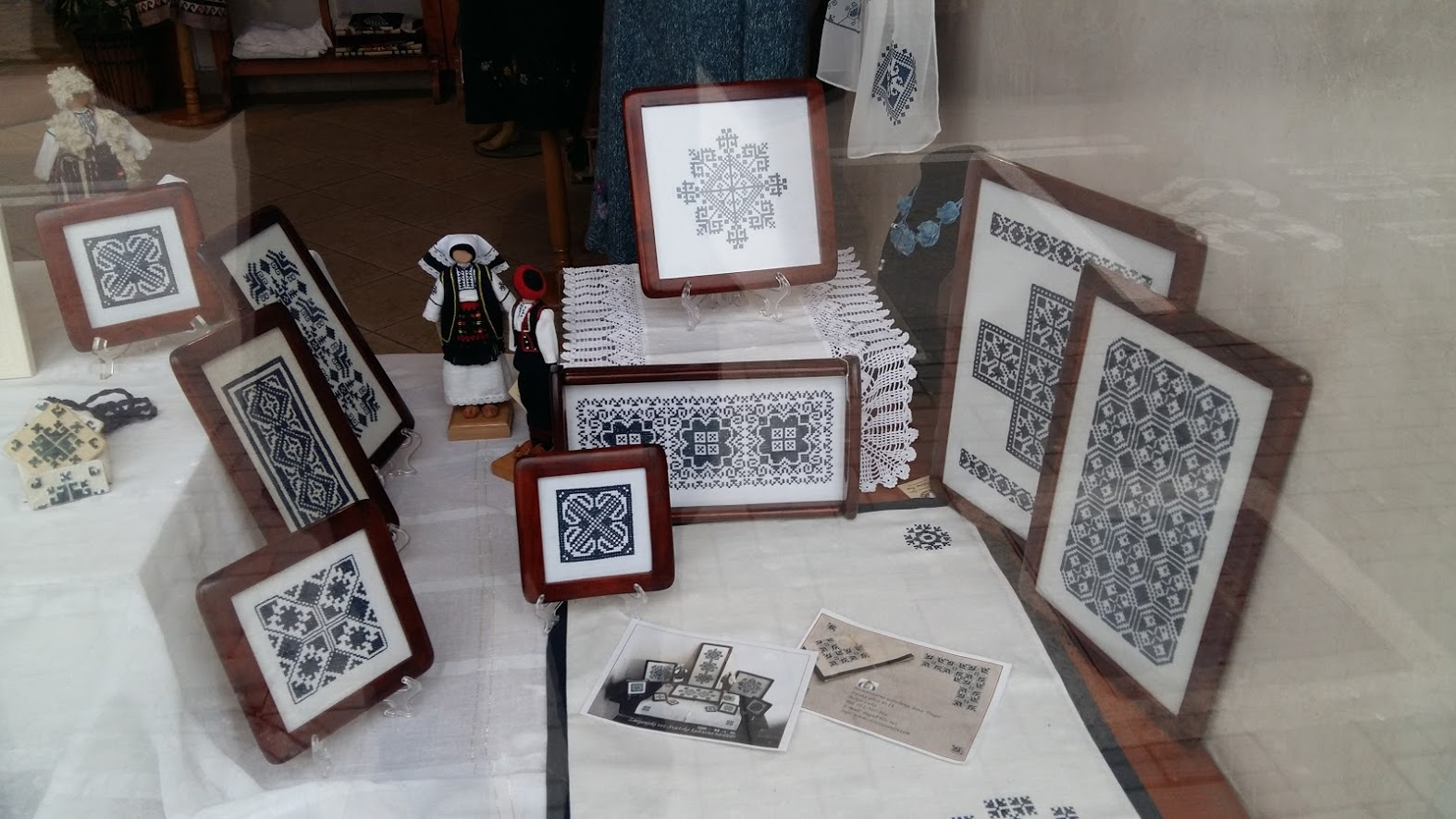
- Zmijanje embroidery in store in Banja Luka
- Type: Embroidery
- Production method: Needlework
- Production process: Handicraft
- Place of origin: Zmijanje, Bosnia and Herzegovina

Zmijanje embroidery
- UNESCO Intangible Cultural Heritage
- Country: Bosnia and Herzegovina
- Reference: 00990
- Region: Europe and North America

Inscription history
- Inscription: 2014 (9th session)
- List: Representative

Zmijanje embroidery (Serbian: Змијањски вез / Zmijanjski vez) is a specific technique of embroidery practised by the women of villages in the area of Zmijanje on mountain Manjača, near Banja Luka in Bosnia and Herzegovina.

In 2014 it was included in the UNESCO Representative List of the Intangible Cultural Heritage of Humanity.

== See also ==
- List of World Heritage Sites in Bosnia and Herzegovina
- Pirot carpet
