= Monastery of St. Basil of Ostrog, Bijeljina =

Monastery in Bijeljina, Bosnia

Monastery of St. Basil of Ostrog Serbian Cyrillic: Манастир Свети Василије Острошки
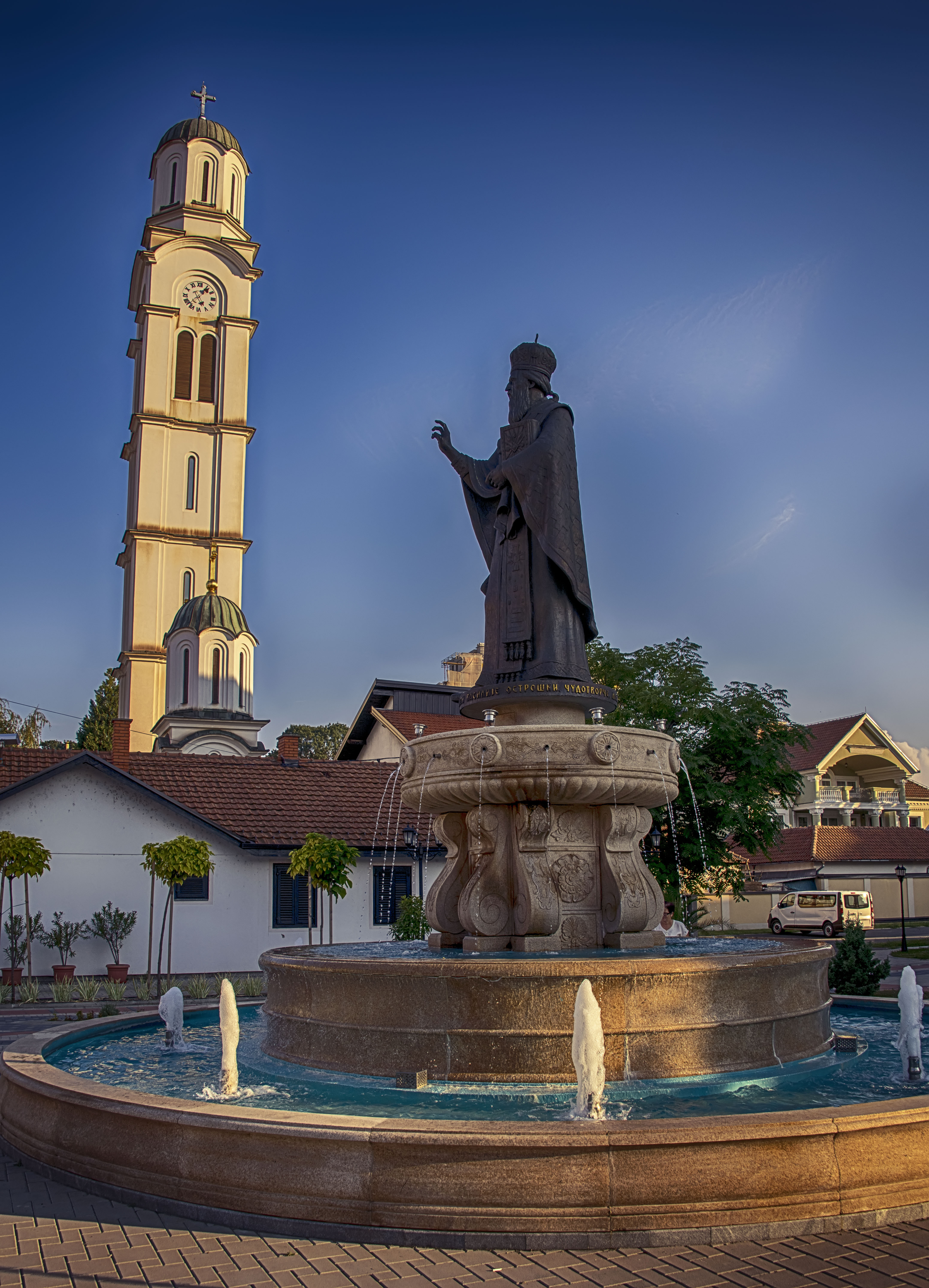

- Location within Bosnia and Herzegovina

Religion
- Affiliation: Serbian Orthodox Church
- Region: Eparchy of Zvornik and Tuzla

Location
- Location: Bijeljina, Bosnia and Herzegovina
- Interactive map of Monastery of St. Basil of Ostrog; Serbian Cyrillic: Манастир Свети Василије Острошки
- Coordinates: 44°45′20.5″N 19°13′04.9″E

Architecture
- Type: Church
- Completed: 1996
- Dome: 1

The Monastery of St. Basil of Ostrog (Serbian Cyrillic: Манастир Свети Василије Острошки) is a Serbian Orthodox monastery located in the city Bijeljina, Republika Srpska, Bosnia and Herzegovina.
