= Popovo Polje =

Field in Bosnia and Herzegovina

- Попово поље
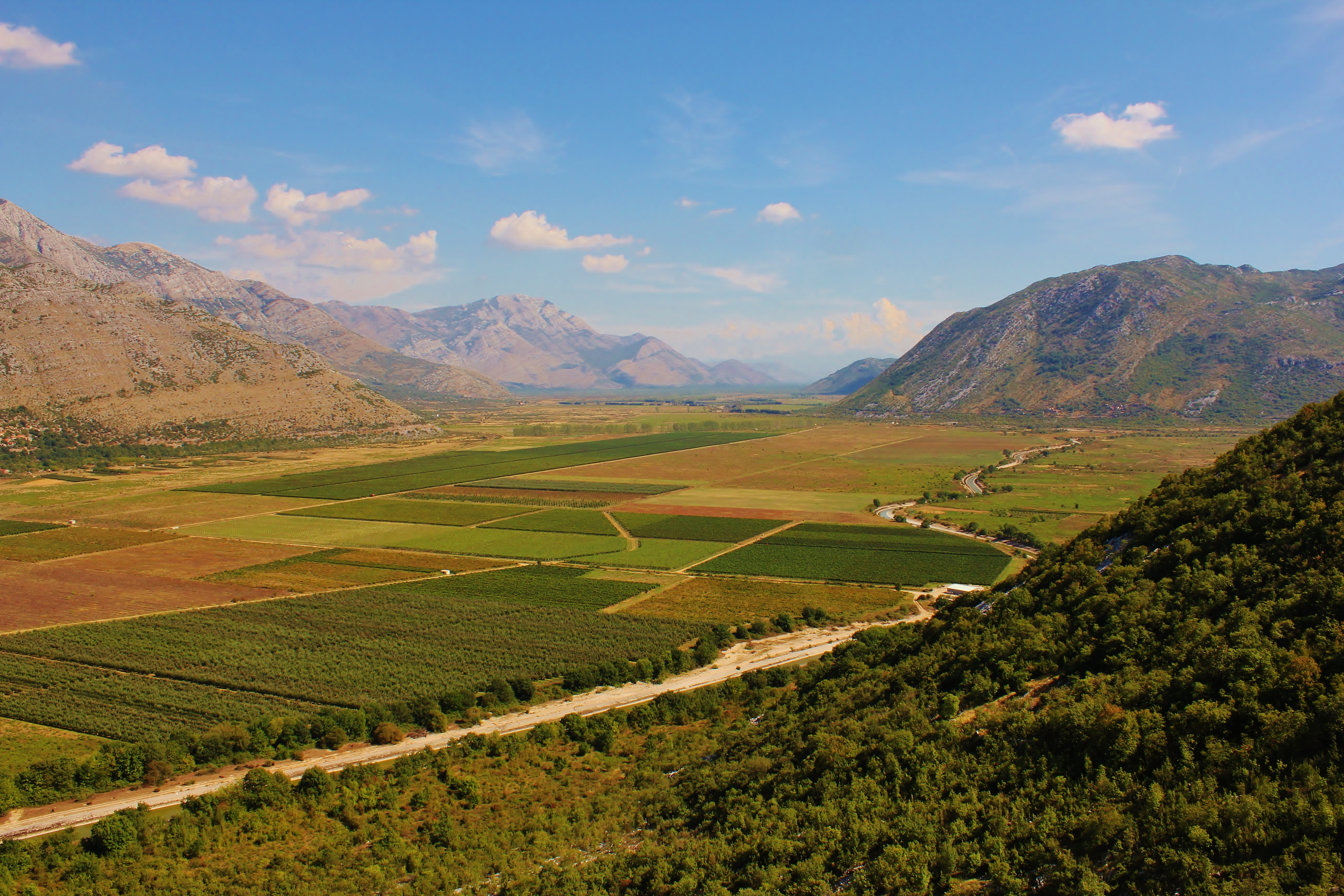
- Popovo Polje, Dinaric karst polje in southern Bosnia and Herzegovina

- Location within Bosnia and Herzegovina
- Floor elevation: 270 to 300 metres (890 to 980 ft)
- Length: 65 km (40 mi) ESE-WNW
- Width: 0.8 to 7 kilometres (0.50 to 4.35 mi)
- Area: 250.5 km^{2} (96.7 mi^{2})
- Depth: 200 to 700 metres (660 to 2,300 ft)

Naming
- English translation: Popovo field

Geography
- Country: Bosnia and Herzegovina
- Population center: Trebinje
- Borders on: Bjelasnica; Kljućnica; Ilino Brdo
- Coordinates: 42°52′N 18°00′E
- River: Trebišnjica
- Interactive map of Popovo Polje

Popovo Polje (Serbo-Croatian: Popovo polje / Попово поље, pronounced [pɔ̌pɔʋɔ pɔ̂ʎɛ]), is a karst field in Bosnia and Herzegovina, located in a southernmost region of the country, near the Adriatic coast. Its size is 5.9 square kilometres (2.3 sq mi).

Popovo polje is one of the most famous polje (karstic plains) in Bosnia and Herzegovina and the world, for its karstic phenomenons and features, and particularly the Trebišnjica river, which flows through the polje as the largest sinking river (also losing stream, or influent stream) in the world, as well as the Vjetrenica cave system, located to the west/south-western parts of the valley.

== History ==
The Nikolić noble family and Sanković noble family held Popovo polje in the late Middle Ages. The Vojnović noble family hailed from Popovo polje. The Zavala Monastery was first mentioned in the 16th century. At the end of Ottoman rule in Herzegovina, the Muslibegović family had properties in Popovo polje. The Zavala Monastery is located here.

== Monuments ==
=== Zavala and Vjetrenica ===
Located in Popovo Polje in Ravno municipality, village Zavala with its old architecture and stone-masonry, together with Vjetrenica cave, constitute the natural and architectural ensemble which is in the process of being protected as National Monument of Bosnia and Herzegovina, and it is already placed on UNESCO Tentative List.

The cave has a rich variety of fauna, with a high rate of endemism. The cave garnered worldwide fame in geological, biological and environmental communities for its imperiled and uncertain future, caused by unprofessional management lacking any expertise, and uncertain status at state and especially local level. Despite setbacks, the government of Bosnia and Herzegovina, although creepingly slowly, nominated Vjeternica (with village Zavala) to UNESCO Tentative List clearly expressing intention to protect the cave and its biodiversity and eventually inscribe it with UNESCO.

== Demographics ==
Some 300 people live in the villages located in the field.

== See also ==
- List of karst polje in Bosnia and Herzegovina
- Zavala Monastery
- Vjetrenica
- Trebišnjica
- Trebinje
- Viduzia

== Sources ==
- Ivo Golub (1 August 1927). Боривоје Дробњаковић (ed.). "Нешто o селима, прелима и народним играма у Попову Пољу – Херцеговина". Гласник Етнографског музеја у Београду, књ. 2: Bulletin du Musée Ethnographique de Belgrade, tome 2. Etnografski muzej u Beogradu: 35–. GGKEY:1WPXWSCBL7J.
- Ljubo Mićević (1 August 1930). Боривоје Дробњаковић (ed.). "Крсно име или крсна слава у Попову". Гласник Етнографског музеја у Београду, књ. 5: Bulletin du Musée Ethnographique de Belgrade, tome 5. Etnografski muzej u Beogradu: 98–. GGKEY:HQ6FZDEECJ4.
