= List of World Heritage Sites in Bosnia and Herzegovina =

Location of UNESCO World Heritage Sites within Bosnia and Herzegovina (blue dots indicate the Stećci sites, green dots are natural sites).

The United Nations Educational, Scientific and Cultural Organization (UNESCO) World Heritage Sites are places of importance to cultural or natural heritage as described in the UNESCO World Heritage Convention, established in 1972. Cultural heritage consists of monuments (such as architectural works, monumental sculptures, or inscriptions), groups of buildings, and sites (including archaeological sites). Natural heritage consists of natural features (physical and biological formations), geological and physiographical formations (including habitats of threatened species of animals and plants), and natural sites which are important from the point of view of science, conservation, or natural beauty. Bosnia and Herzegovina inherited the former country of Yugoslavia's accession to the convention on 12 July 1993 as one of the successor states.

There are five sites in Bosnia and Herzegovina on the list and a further nine on the tentative list. The first site, the Old Bridge Area of the Old City of Mostar, was inscribed to the list at the 29th UNESCO session in 2005. The Mehmed Paša Sokolović Bridge in Višegrad was inscribed to the list in 2007. This was followed by the inscription of the Stećci Medieval Tombstones Graveyards in 2016. The latter is a transnational site, shared with Croatia, Serbia, and Montenegro. Out of 28 listed Stećci sites, 20 are located in Bosnia and Herzegovina, with the most prominent one in Radimlja. The most recent site added to the list was the Vjetrenica Cave. The Janj forest, part of the Ancient and Primeval Beech Forests of the Carpathians and Other Regions of Europe, and Vjetrenica Cave are natural sites, while the other three sites are cultural.

== World Heritage Sites ==
UNESCO lists sites under ten criteria; each entry must meet at least one of the criteria. Criteria i through vi are cultural, and vii through x are natural.

* Transnational site

Site	Image	Location (municipality)	Year listed	UNESCO data	Description
Old Bridge Area of the Old City of Mostar	Stari Most	Mostar	2005	946; vi (cultural)	This site encompasses the Old Bridge and the surrounding area. The Ottoman bridge, which crosses the Neretva river, was commissioned by Suleiman the Magnificent and completed in 1566/67. In 1993, during the Bosnian War, it was deliberately shelled and destroyed by the Croatian Defence Council. After the war, the bridge was rebuilt using traditional construction methods and local materials, and reopened in 2004.
Mehmed Paša Sokolović Bridge	Mehmed Paša Sokolović Bridge	Višegrad	2007	1260; ii, iv (cultural)	The Mehmed Paša Sokolović Bridge, which crosses the Drina river, was completed in 1577 by the Ottoman court architect Mimar Sinan on the orders of the Grand Vizier Mehmed Paša Sokolović. The bridge is 179.5 metres (589 ft) long and has 11 arches. The bridge also has a symbolic significance as the meeting place between Christianity and Islam.
Stećci Medieval Tombstones Graveyards*	Radimlja necropolis	20 sites	2016	1504; iii, vi (cultural)	Stećci (sing. stećak) are the monolith medieval tombstones found in modern-day Bosnia and Herzegovina, as well as parts of Croatia, Serbia, and Montenegro. They first appeared in the 12th century and reached their peak in the 14th and 15th centuries. There are 20 sites in Bosnia and Herzegovina, mostly in the southeastern part of the country. The largest cluster is located in Radimlja, in the Stolac municipality.
Ancient and Primeval Beech Forests of the Carpathians and Other Regions of Europe*	Forest and river	Šipovo	2021	1133quater; ix (natural)	This site comprises undisturbed examples of temperate forests that demonstrate the postglacial expansion process of European beech from a few isolated refuge areas in the Alps, Carpathians, Dinarides, Mediterranean, and Pyrenees. The site was originally listed in 2007 as the Primeval Beech Forests of the Carpathians, shared by Slovakia and Ukraine, extended in 2011 to include the Ancient Beech Forests of Germany, and further extended in 2017 and 2021 to include forests in a total of 18 countries. The Janj forest in Bosnia and Herzegovina was listed in 2021.
Vjetrenica Cave, Ravno	Entrance to a cave protected by a fence	Ravno	2024	1673; vii, x (natural)	Vjetrenica (meaning "the wind cave") is the largest cave in Bosnia and Herzegovina. In the warmer parts of the year, cold air blows from its entrance. It is an important biodiversity spot. Fossils of prehistoric carnivores have been found in the cave.

== Tentative list ==
In addition to the sites inscribed on the World Heritage List, member states can maintain a list of tentative sites that they may consider for nomination. Nominations for the World Heritage List are only accepted if the site was previously listed on the tentative list. Bosnia and Herzegovina records nine sites on its tentative list.

Site	Image	Location (municipality)	Year listed	UNESCO criteria	Description
Sarajevo – unique symbol of universal multiculture – continual open city (N.I.)	Sarajevo	Sarajevo	1997	v (cultural)	Sarajevo, the capital of Bosnia and Herzegovina, has a long and rich history of religious and cultural diversity.
The natural and architectural ensemble of Jajce	Jajce	Jajce	2006	ii, iii, iv, v, vi, vii (mixed)	The city of Jajce is located at the confluence of the Pliva and Vrbas rivers. It was founded in the Middle Ages and acquired its final form during the Ottoman period.
The historic urban site of Počitelj	Počitelj	Čapljina	2007	ii, iii, iv, v, vi (cultural)	The city of Počitelj presents one of the few urban ensembles in Bosnia and Herzegovina preserved in their integrity from the medieval and Ottoman periods.
The natural and architectural ensemble of Blagaj	Blagaj	Mostar	2007	ii, iii, iv, v, vi, vii (mixed)	The town of Blagaj, situated at the spring of the Buna river, contains several examples of Ottoman architecture, such as the Blagaj Tekke.
The natural and architectural ensemble of Blidinje	Blidinjsko jezero	Jablanica, Posušje, Tomislavgrad	2007	i, iii, iv, v, vi, vii, viii, ix (mixed)	The Blidinje Nature Park area is an example of the geological processes that took place during the orogenesis of the Dinarides, as well as an example of the evolutionary development of postglacial flora and fauna. The area features a wide range of endemic plant communities and contains several stećak tombstones.
The natural and architectural ensemble of Stolac	Stolac	Stolac	2007	ii, iii, iv, v, vi, vii (mixed)	The historic core of Stolac is an example of a complex cultural-historical and natural environmental ensemble. The area contains remains from prehistory, the Illyrian-Roman era, the Middle Ages, and the Ottoman, Austro-Hungarian, and Yugoslav periods.
Strict Nature Reserve – Primeval forest "Perućica"	Perućica	Foča	2017	vii, ix, x (natural)	The primeval forest of Perućica is an important biodiversity spot, home to brown bear, wolf, and lynx, as well as to several species of birds, reptiles, and amphibians. Its mountain creek forms the 75 m (246 ft) high Skakavac Waterfall.
Jewish Cemetery in Sarajevo	Jewish Cemetery in Sarajevo	Sarajevo	2018	ii, iii, iv, vi (cultural)	The burial complex lies on a steep site and covers a total area of 31,160 m^{2} (335,400 sq ft). There are more than 3,850 tombstones in a total of seven plots, along with four memorials erected to the victims of World War II fascist terror and several cenotaphs. The complex also includes a large Ashkenazi ossuary built in 1962 following the exhumation of the old and the new Ashkenazi graveyards. In 1966, the cemetery was closed for burials. It is believed that the Geniza (a graveyard for worn out books) is located in the southeastern part of the cemetery.
Complex of travertine waterfalls in Martin Brod - Una National Park	Waterfall on Una river in Martin Brod	Bihać	2019	vii, ix (natural)	The upper stream of river Una features a series of waterfalls and travertine formations and is an important biodiversity spot.

== See also ==
- List of Intangible Cultural Heritage elements in Bosnia and Herzegovina
- List of National Monuments of Bosnia and Herzegovina
- List of protected areas of Bosnia and Herzegovina
- Architecture of Bosnia and Herzegovina
- List of Museums in Bosnia and Herzegovina
