= Marian Wenzel =

British artist and art historian (1932–2002)

- Born: 18 December 1932; Pittsburgh, Pennsylvania, USA
- Died: 6 January 2002 (aged 69); London, United Kingdom
- Education: Columbia University
- Known for: Research on Medieval Bosnia Stećaks
- Scientific career
- Fields: Art History
- Workplaces: Courtauld Institute of Art

Marian Barbara Wenzel (18 December 1932 – 6 January 2002) was a British artist and art historian. She dedicated most of her active career to research of Bosnian-Herzegovinian art and cultural history.

== Education ==
Wenzel was born in 1932 in Pittsburgh (Pennsylvania, USA). After receiving her degree in philosophy at Columbia University in New York in 1957, she continued her studies at the Courtauld Institute of Art in London, where she received her PhD in 1966 on the decorative motifs found on the medieval stećak tombstones of Bosnia and Herzegovina.

== Research ==
Her research on Bosnia and Herzegovina in medieval times led to her collaboration with Alojz Benac, then director of the National Museum of Bosnia and Herzegovina, as well as other renowned names in the field, including Vlajko Palavestra, Đuro Basler, Šefik Bešlagić, Nada Miletić, Pavao Anđelic, Marko Vego. Wenzel spent the early 1960s travelling throughout the country, documenting the motifs on the stećaks, resulting in her 1965 publication Ornamental Tombstones In Mediaeval Bosnia And Surrounding Regions. Her research (along with that of John Fine) also challenged the contemporary view that the Bosnian Church was adherent to Bogumilism, and she furthermore espoused the view that stećaks were the material culture of followers of the Catholic, Orthodox and Bosnian Churches within the region. She also argued that the Vlachs were the creators of the stecci.

Her primary focus of research then switched to metalworking, a craft from which she believed many of the recurring motifs apparent on stećak tombstones was derived, coining the term Bosnian Style, for the style of ornamentation (metal, stone), incorporating a mixture of Gothic, Mediterranean-Islamic and Byzantine.

During the War in Bosnia and Herzegovina, Wenzel founded the charity Bosnia-Herzegovina Heritage Rescue (BHHR) which functioned until 2004, and visited the country on several occasions in the midst of hostilities.

== Writings ==
Besides the academic publications listed under 'Research' above, Marian was a poet and a writer and illustrator of short stories. The best of these are channeled material she received in the shape of children's stories from the Egyptian god Alperas, son of Anubis ('Let's Not Be Afraid: Stories, as told by Alperas, son of Anubis, and Marian Wenzel', Blue Dragon Press, 1996.) The illustrations in these volume were produced automatically; Marian could talk about something else while letting her pen create drawings of which she had no conscious awareness.

== Death and legacy ==
Marian Wenzel died from cancer in 2002 at the age of 69. Throughout her lifetime, she published over 30 essays on the cultural heritage of Bosnia and Herzegovina, as well as other titles of topics in the field of culture and art. After her death she bequeathed her personal archives to the History Museum of Bosnia and Herzegovina, and her artworks to the National Gallery of Bosnia and Herzegovina.

A retrospective exhibition of her life and work was hosted by the History Museum of Bosnia and Herzegovina in 2010, following on from a previous exhibition of her artworks in 1998.
