= Dženan Dautović =

Bosnian historian (born 1980)

Docent Dženan Dautović
- Born: October 2, 1980; Travnik, SR Bosnia and Herzegovina, SFR Yugoslavia
- Education: University of Sarajevo
- Scientific career
- Fields: Medievalistic
- Workplaces: Department of History at the Faculty of Philosophy in Tuzla; Regional Museum Travnik
- Thesis: Bosna i Rimska kurija u srednjem vijeku (translated: Bosnia and the Roman Curia in the Middle Ages) (2017)
- Doctoral advisor: Dubravko Lovrenović
- Other academic advisors: Pejo Ćošković

Dženan Dautović (Travnik, 2 October 1980) is a Bosnian historian, doctoral researcher, and assistant professor who specializes in the history and historiography of medieval Bosnia and its international relations, including long relations with the Papacy.

== Education ==
Dženan Dautović was born on 1980 in Travnik, where he received his primary and secondary education. Dautović completed his primary historical studies by graduating at the History Department (Odsjek za historiju) of the University of Sarajevo, Faculty of Philosophy. He completed his master's thesis, titled Historiografija o srednjovjekovnoj Bosni: (1945-2012) (translated: Historiography of Medieval Bosnia: (1945-2012)), under the mentorship of Prof. dr. Pejo Ćošković. and went on to obtain his doctorate on the subject of a relations between medieval Bosnian state and Papacy in the Middle Ages, with doctoral thesis "Bosna i Rimska kurija u srednjem vijeku" (Bosnia and the Roman Curia in the Middle Ages), which he defended on November 15, 2017, at the Faculty of Philosophy at the University of Sarajevo, under the mentorship of the late prominent Bosnian historian Prof. Dr. Dubravko Lovrenović. This research later served as the foundation for his comprehensive 2026 monograph published under the same title.

== Research interests ==
He conducted research in archives in Travnik, Sarajevo, Belgrade, Dubrovnik and the Vatican, as well as in libraries in Budapest, Bochum and Rome. He was awarded a Lemmerman Foundation scholarship for research in Rome in 2016. He is the editor of the proceedings Medieval Bosnia and Southeastern Europe (Arc Humanities Press, 2019), one of the authors of the seminal Codex Diplomaticus Regni Bosnae (Mladinska knjiga, 2018), co-author of the monograph Travnička šahovska hronika (translated: Travnik Chess Chronicle) (Preporod, 2013), and author of 22 scientific and review articles published by domestic and foreign publishers.

His research interests focus on development of the medieval Bosnian state including political, cultural, and religious dynamics of the Bosnian Banate and Kingdom during the Middle Ages; he is also interested in historical memory about this era during the early modern period. He is also interested in the institutional history of the Bosnian Church (Crkva bosanska). His interest in Papacy and the border European regions in the middle ages, including diplomatic ties with the Papacy and the Kingdom of Hungary between 13th and 15th century, culminated with his book, Bosna i Rimska kurija u srednjem vijeku (translated: Bosnia and the Roman Curia in the Middle Ages), published in 2026, Dautović produced a comprehensive monographic synthesis on political and religious relations spanning nearly a thousand years between Bosnia and the Roman Curia, and tracking the evolution of local religious systems and European diplomacy. Historiography about medieval Bosnia, and the influence of the Nationalist and Socialist ideologies on the historical writings. He's researched about the game of chess in medieval Islamic and European civilizations, and medieval marriage practices. A historical development of his native town of Travnik is also subject of interest for Dautović.

== Career ==
Dautović is a Docent of Medieval History and works as a lecturer of Medieval History at the University of Tuzla, and national Bosnian history at the University of Bihać. He also works as a senior historical curator at the Regional Museum in Travnik.

== Public engagements ==
Dautović often speaks against the abuse and distortion of history, especially through ideologization and weaponization of medieval history and pseudo-scientific narratives for ethno-nationalistic political purpose in Southeast Europe.

== Work and publications ==
- Bosna i Rimska kurija u srednjem vijeku (2026): Published by the Dram radosti publishing house
- Medieval Bosnia and South-East European Relations (2019) - book co-edited with Emir O. Filipović and Neven Isailović, evaluating the geopolitical role of medieval Bosnia as a cultural crossroads.

== See also ==
- Medieval literacy of Bosnia and Herzegovina
