= Nada Miletić =

Bosnian medievalist, art historian and archaeologist

- Born: 1925
- Died: 2002 (aged 76–77)
- Occupations: Archaeologist, medievalist, curator
- Employer(s): National Museum of Bosnia and Herzegovina

Nada Miletić (1925 - 2002) was a Bosnian medievalist, art historian and archaeologist, who was a scientific expert at the National Museum of Bosnia and Herzegovina and founded the study of the Migration Period in Bosnian archaeology.

== Career ==
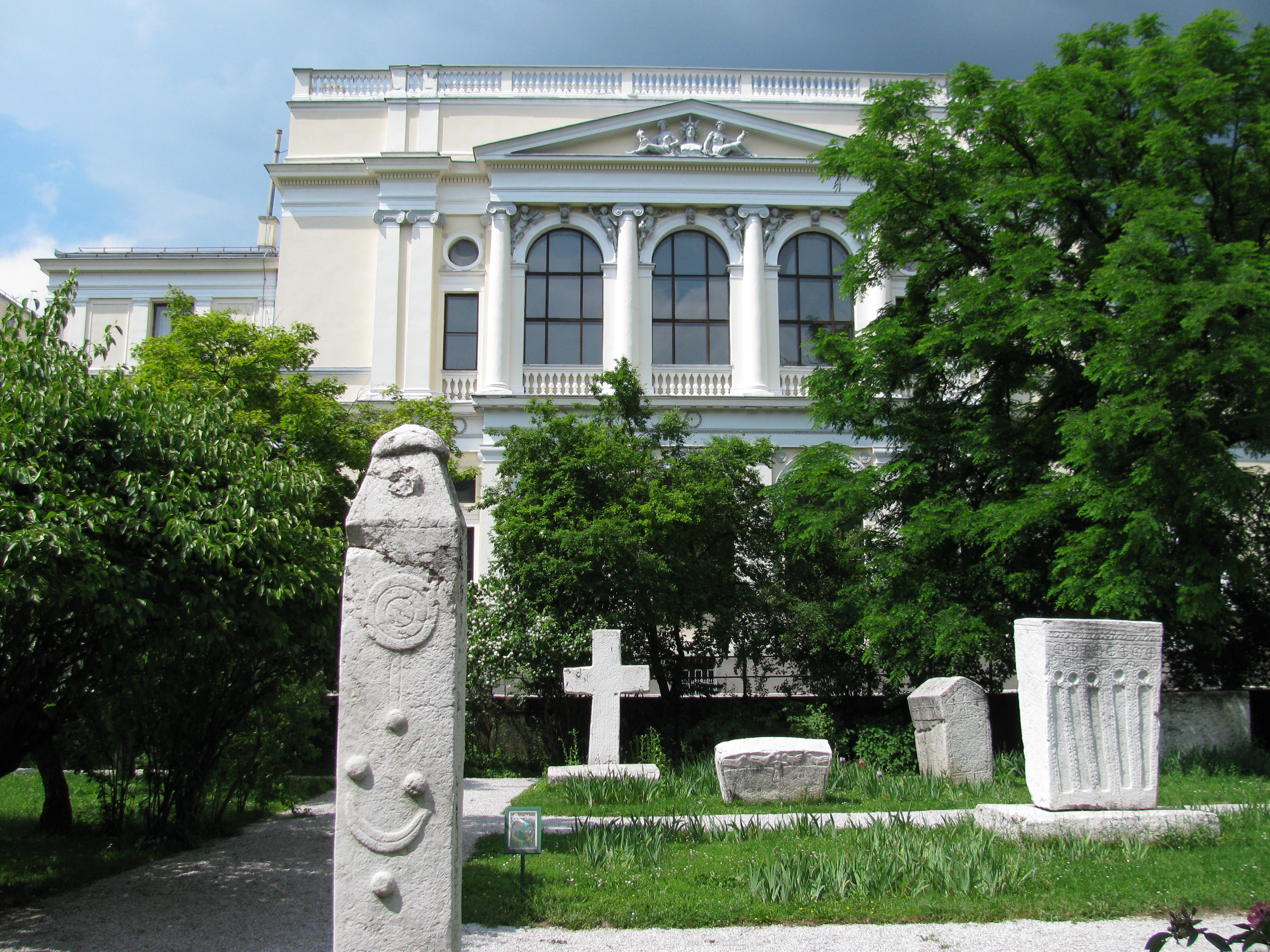
Medieval tombstones around National Museum of Bosnia and Herzegovina

Miletić worked at the National Museum of Bosnia and Herzegovina throughout her career. As an archaeologist she established the study of the Migration Period and Early Slav period in Bosnia and Herzegovina, expanding the collections held by the museum. As a medievalist, she worked on the history of medieval jewellery and art, and had a particular focus on the medieval tombstones known as stećak. As part of the 75th anniversary celebrations of the museum, one of the special exhibitions made showcased Miletić's work on medieval jewellery.

Miletić wrote the chapter on Bosnia in the Early Middle Ages for Kulturna istorija Bosne i Hercegovine od najstarijih vremena do pada ovih zemalja pod osmansku vlast, a foundational work that included contributions from historians of the region, such as, Alojz Benac, Đuro Basler, Borivoj Čović, Esad Pašalić and Pavao Anđelić. She was also an expert on bogomilism, a tenth century Slavic sect. As an excavator, she worked on many sites, including: the 800 graves from the Čipuljić site near Bugojno, at Glasinac, and worked on the site of Brijesnica, and led excavations at Gomjenica.

Miletić died aged 78 in 2002. In her obituary, Lidija Fekeža described her as a member of "an exceptional generation of archaeologists".

== Historiography ==
For Miletić the Middle Ages, began in the sixth century - dating that subsequent historians, such as Đuro Basler, have countered. She and Alojz Benac dated the phenomenon of the stećak to the thirteenth century, but this dating has been debated, in particular by Šefik Bešlagić and Dubravko Lovrenović, who date the tombstones to the mid-twelfth century.

== Selected works ==
- Umjetnost stećaka (Zemaljski muze, 1965)
- Nekropola u selu Mihaljevićima kod Rajlovca
- Miletić, Nada. "Reljefna ploča iz Carevog polja kod Jajca." Godišnjak Centra za balkanološka ispitivanja 32 (2002): 493–507.
