= Dubravko Lovrenović =

Bosnian and Yugoslav historian (1956–2017)

Professor Dubravko Lovrenović
- Born: August 30, 1956; Jajce, PR Bosnia and Herzegovina, FPR Yugoslavia
- Died: January 17, 2017 (aged 60); Sarajevo, Bosnia and Herzegovina
- Resting place: Bare Cemetery, (transl. City Cemetery Bare), Sarajevo; 43.8765°N 18.3980°E
- Education: University of Sarajevo
- Spouse: Alisa Mahmutović
- Scientific career
- Fields: Medievalistic
- Workplaces: Department of History at the Faculty of Philosophy in Sarajevo
- Thesis: Na klizištu povijesti: Sveta kruna ugarska i sveta kruna bosanska 1387-1463
- Doctoral students: Dženan Dautović

Dubravko Lovrenović (30 August 1956 – 17 January 2017) was a Bosnian and Herzegovinian medievalist, author and essayist, who worked at the Faculty of Philosophy of the University of Sarajevo, Department of History, in Sarajevo, Bosnia and Herzegovina.

== Education ==
Lovrenović graduated at the University of Sarajevo, the Department of History from the Faculty of Philosophy in 1979. He entered his postgraduate studies at the University of Belgrade and completed it in 1985 with the master thesis "Balkanske zemlje prema mletačko-ugarskim ratovima početkom XV stoljeća" (English: Balkan countries in context of the Venetian-Hungarian wars of the early 15th century). At the same school Lovrenović successfully defended his doctoral dissertation "Ugarska i Bosna 1387-1463" (English: Hungary and Bosnia 1387-1463) on December 18, 1999.

== Career ==
At the Department of History of the Faculty of Philosophy in Sarajevo, he passed through all the university's posts, including tenure as a full-time professor of medieval Bosnia and Herzegovina history. He spent the Winter Semester 2001/2002 as a visiting professor at the Yale in the United States. In 2005, he was a stipendiary at the Central European University in Budapest. He was President of the Department of History and Vice Dean for the teaching of the Faculty of Philosophy in Sarajevo.

He has published a number of books and works on the subject of his academic interest (stećci, Bosnian Middle Ages, contemporary interpretation, usage and revision, mythomania and influence of ethno-nationalism in re-interpretation of history) in domestic and foreign professional journals, as well as dozens of essays, publicist texts. As a member of several editorial offices, Lovrenović is editor of numerous book releases, reviewed numerous editions, promoted many publications. He was organizer of scientific conferences, leader and participant in number of scientific projects and researches.

He was inaugurated at Academy of Sciences and Arts of Bosnia and Herzegovina, where he also served as a Secretary of the Committee of historical sciences.

== Research interests ==
His main research interests were Medieval Bosnian and European History, with special regard to the region of Central-Eastern Europe; region's cultural history and material culture, stećci in particular; Hungarian-Bosnian relations in the Middle Ages; reception and interpretation of Bosnian medieval times and its modern age usage, revision and re-interpretation in form of historical myths by domestic and especially neighboring ethno-nationalist portion of the political and academic elite.

Nada Miletić and Alojz Benac dated the phenomenon of the stećak to the thirteenth century, but this dating has been debated, in particular by Šefik Bešlagić and Lovrenović, who date the tombstones to the mid-twelfth century.

== Special projects, service and activities ==
As a member of the Commission to preserve national monuments of Bosnia and Herzegovina, institution which in many cases act in close cooperation with UNESCO, Lovrenović lead a project to include stećak tombstones onto World List. Since 2012 he was a member of the Society for study of medieval Bosnian history, among number of other associations and societies.

Lovrenović served as Deputy Minister of Education, Science, Culture and Sport in a Government of Federation of Bosnia and Herzegovina from 2001 to 2003. He was active in helping and organizing support for vulnerable population and people in need around post-war Bosnia and Herzegovina.

== Personal life ==
Lovrenović was married to Alisa Mahmutović, a linguist from Tuzla. The suicide of his 14-year-old stepson, Mahir Rakovac, in December 2015 led Lovrenović and Mahmutović to devote themselves to the issue of school bullying. Lovrenović and his wife both died of cancer shortly thereafter, on 17 January and 26 June 2017 respectively.

== Works ==
=== Published books ===
List per ANU BiH:

1. Na klizištu povijesti (sveta kruna ugarska i sveta kruna bosanska) 1387-1463, Synopsis, Zagreb-Sarajevo, 2006.
2. Povijest est magistra vitae, Rabic, Sarajevo 2008, 385.
3. Sirat ćuprija fra Ante Kneževića, Dobra knjiga, Sarajevo 2008.
4. Stećci : bosansko i humsko mramorje srednjeg vijeka, Rabic, 1.izdanje, Sarajevo 2009, 332.
5. Stećci : bosansko i humsko mramorje srednjeg vijeka, Rabic, 2. izdanje, Sarajevo 2010, 426.
6. Medieval tombstones : and graveyards of Bosnia and Hum, Rabic, 3.izdanje (na engleskom jeziku), Sarajevo 2010,426.
7. Bosanska kvadratura kruga, Dobra knjiga - Synopsis, Sarajevo - Zagreb, 2012, 495.
8. Stećci : bosansko i humsko mramorje srednjeg vijeka, Ljevak, 4. izdanje, Zagreb 2013, 452.

- Google Scholar: Dubravko Lovrenović

=== Articles, essays, polemics, reviews ===
List per ANU BiH:

1. Kroatizacija bosanskog srednjovjekovlja u svjetlu interkonfesionalnosti stecaka (O jednom modelu promjene historijskog pamcenja) (transl. Croatization of the Bosnian Middle Ages in Light of the Religious Character of Stecak Tombstones (About a model of the changing the historical memory)) - 2013 admittance lecture at Academy of Sciences and Arts of Bosnia and Herzegovina, published 2014 in academy's GODIŠNJAK/JAHRBUCH - Centar za balkanološka ispitivanja.
2. Profani teror - Sveta retorika (Kako je bosanski vojvoda Radosav Pavlović postao opaki pataren, bič katoličke vjere), Spomenica akademika Marka Šunjića (1927-1998), Filozofski fakultet, Sarajevo 2010, 103-160.
3. Translatio sedis i uspostava novog konfesionalnog identiteta u srednjovjekovnoj Bosni - I, Franjevački samostan u Gučoj Gori, Zbornik radova sa znantvenog skupa u povodu 150. obljetnice samostana u Gučoj Gori održanog 25. i 26. rujna 2009. u Gučoj Gori, Guča Gora - Sarajevo 2010, 113-125.
4. Bosanski Jeremija u novom izdanju: uz reprint izdanje Kratke povijesti kralja bosanskih (Dubrovnik, 1884, 1886, 1887) fra Antuna Kneževića, Bosna franciscana XVII/30, Sarajevo 2009, 241-251.
5. Profani teror – sveta retorika. (Kako je bosanski vojvoda Radosav Pavlović postao opaki pataren, bič katoličke vjere), Bosna franciscana XVII/31, Sarajevo 2009, 129-187.
6. Јелена Мргић, Северна Бoсна 13 – 16. век, Посебна издања, књига 55, Историјски институт, Београд, 2008., Bosna franciscana XVII/31, Sarajevo 2009, 356-361.
7. Ugarsko-bosanski odnsoi i konfesionalna povijest srednjovjekovne Bosne u djelu Lajosa Thallóczya, Bosna franciscana XVI/29, Sarajevo 2008, 77-89.
8. Krist i donator: Kotromanići između vjere rimske i vjere bosanske – II. – (Konfesionalne posljedice jednog lokalnog crkvenog raskola), “Tristota obljetnica stradanja samostana i crkve u Olovu (1704-2004)”, Zbornik radova sa Znanstvenog skupa, Znanstveni skup u povodu 300. obljetnice stradanja samostana i crkve u Olovu (1704-2004), Sarajevo, 15. i 16. listopada 2004. (Predgovor: Marko Karamatić), Franjevačka teologija Sarajevo, Sarajevo 2008, 17-54.
9. Duž balkanskih historiografskih transverzala, Zeničke sveske – Časopis za društvenu fenomenologiju i kulturnu dijalogiku, br. 03/06, Zenica, 2006, 11-20.
10. O historiografiji iz Prokrustove postelje (Kako se i zašto kali(o) bogumilski mit), Status 10, Mostar, 2006, 256-286.
11. Bošnjačka recepcija bosanskog srednjovjekovlja, Zeničke sveske – Časopis za društvenu fenomenologiju i kulturnu dijalogiku, br. 02/05, Zenica, decembar 2005, 241-290.
12. Modeli ideološkog isključivanja: Ugarska i Bosna kao ideološki protivnici na osnovu različitih konfesija kršćanstva, Prilozi Instituta za istoriju 33, Sarajevo, 2004, 9-57.
13. Fojnički grbovnik, ilirska heraldika i bosansko srednjovjekovlje, Bosna Franciscana XII/21, Sarajevo, 2004, 172-202.
14. Središte bez središta (povratak iz unutrašnjeg izgnanstva), Status 3, Mostar, 2004, 95-97.
15. Hrvoje Vukčić Hrvatinić i srednjodalmatinske komune (1398.-1413.), Zbornik radova Jajce 1396-1996, Jajce, 2002, 31-51.
16. Tri etnonacionalna pogleda u bosansko srednjovjekovlje, Forum Bosnae, 18, Sarajevo, 2002.
17. Vitez, herceg i pataren (Ideološki stereotipi i životna stvarnost), Forum Bosnae 7-8, Sarajevo, 2000, 257-294; “Zbornik radova sa Znanstvenog skupa u povodu 500. obljetnice smrti Fra Anđela Zvizdovića”, FTS-Franjevački samostan Fojnica, Sarajevo-Fojnica, 2000, 21-59.
18. Proglašenje Bosne kraljevstvom (Pokušaj revalorizacije), Forum Bosnae 3-4, Sarajevo, 1999, 227-287.
19. Srednjovjekovna Bosna i srednjoeuropska kultura (Prožimanja i akulturacija), Forum Bosnae 5, Sarajevo, 1999, 177-206
20. Na ishodištu srednjovjekovne bosanske etno-politogeneze, Bosna Franciscana VI/9, Sarajevo, 1998, 85-125.
21. Bosansko srednjovjekovlje u svjetlu kristijanizacije vladarske ideologije (Na trećem putu tzv. "monarhijske pobožnosti"), Bosna Franciscana V/8, Sarajevo, 1998, 156-193..
22. Bosansko-humski mramorovi – stećci, Bosna Franciscana V/7, Sarajevo, 1997, 94-139.
23. Bosanski mitovi, Erasmvs 18, Zagreb, 1996, 26-37.
24. Uticaj Ugarske na odnos Crkve i države u srednjovjekovnoj Bosni, "Sedam stoljeća bosanskih franjevaca 1291.-1991.", (zbornik radova), FTS, Samobor, 1994, 37-93.
25. Srednjovjekovna Evropa. Definiranje pojmova, utvrđivanje sadržaja, omeđivanje prostora, Radovi 27, Zagreb, 1994, 289-302.
26. Hrvoje Vukčić Hrvatinić i splitska komuna, Prilozi Instituta za istoriju XXII/23, Sarajevo, 1987, 37-45.
27. Jelena Nelipčić, splitska vojvotkinja i bosanska kraljica, Radovi 20, Zagreb, 1987, 183-193.
28. Istočni Jadran u odnosima između Hrvoja Vukčića i Sandalja Hranića na prelazu iz XIV. u XV. stoljeće, Glasnik arhiva i Društva arhivskih radnika BiH 27, Sarajevo, 1987, 55-66.
29. Cetinski knez Ivaniš Nelipčić u političkim previranjima u Dalmaciji krajem 14. i tokom prvih decenija 15. stoljeća, Prilozi Instituta za istoriju XXI/22, Sarajevo, 1986, 199-220.
30. Ostrovica i Skradin u mletačko-ugarskim ratovima za Dalmaciju (1409.-1420.), Historijski zbornik 39, Zagreb, 1986, 163-172.
31. Kako je bosanski vojvoda Sandalj Hranić došao u posjed Ostrovice i Skradina, Radovi 19, Zagreb, 1986, 231-236.
32. Da li je Jelena Nelipčić bila majka Balše Hercegovića, Istorijski zbornik 7, Banja Luka, 1986, 193-198.

- Google Scholar: Dubravko Lovrenović

=== Literature ===
List per ANU BiH:

- Adnan Buturović, Tragedija Bosne jeste što se historijska svijest izražava kao mitska svijest!, (Intervju: Dr. Dubravko Lovrenović), Slobodna Bosna IV/105, Sarajevo 1998, 38-39, 46.
- Nerzuk Ćurak, Intervju Dana: Dubravko Lovrenović, Dani 74, Sarajevo 27. 04. 1998, 8-12.
- Marko Hrskanović, Prof. Dubravko Lovrenović, “Marko Hrskanović, Odgojitelji, profesori i studenti Vrhbosanske bogoslovije Travnik-Sarajevo 1890.-1990., ‘Vrhbosanska katolička bogoslovija 1890.-1990. Zbornik radova znanstvenog simpozija održanog u Sarajevu 3. i 4. srpnja 1991. godine prigodom obilježavanja stote obljetnice postojanja Bogoslovije”, SV 5, Sarajevo-Bol 1993, 456.
- Ivan Lučić, U traženju izgubljene domovine (Interview), Matica 50/8, Zagreb 2000., 28-30.
- Lejla Sarajlić, Interview: Dubravko Lovrenović, povjesničar, Krijesnica VI/16-17, Zenica 1999, 4-9.
- Angelina Šimić, Refleksije istorije (Bosna u europskom srednjem vijeku na “Napretkovoj” tribini, Dubravko Lovrenović), Oslobođenje 51/16530, Sarajevo 12.6. 1994, 10.
- ... Dubravko Lovrenović, “Filozofski fakultet Univerziteta u Sarajevu, Spomenica (1950-1980)”, FF, Sarajevo 1980, 42.
- ... Vlada Federacije nikada ništa nije uradila da se stećci u Radimlji zaštite! (Dubravko Lovrenović), Slobodna Bosna VI/191, Sarajevo 2000, 66.
