= Stećak =

Monumental medieval tombstones in the Balkans

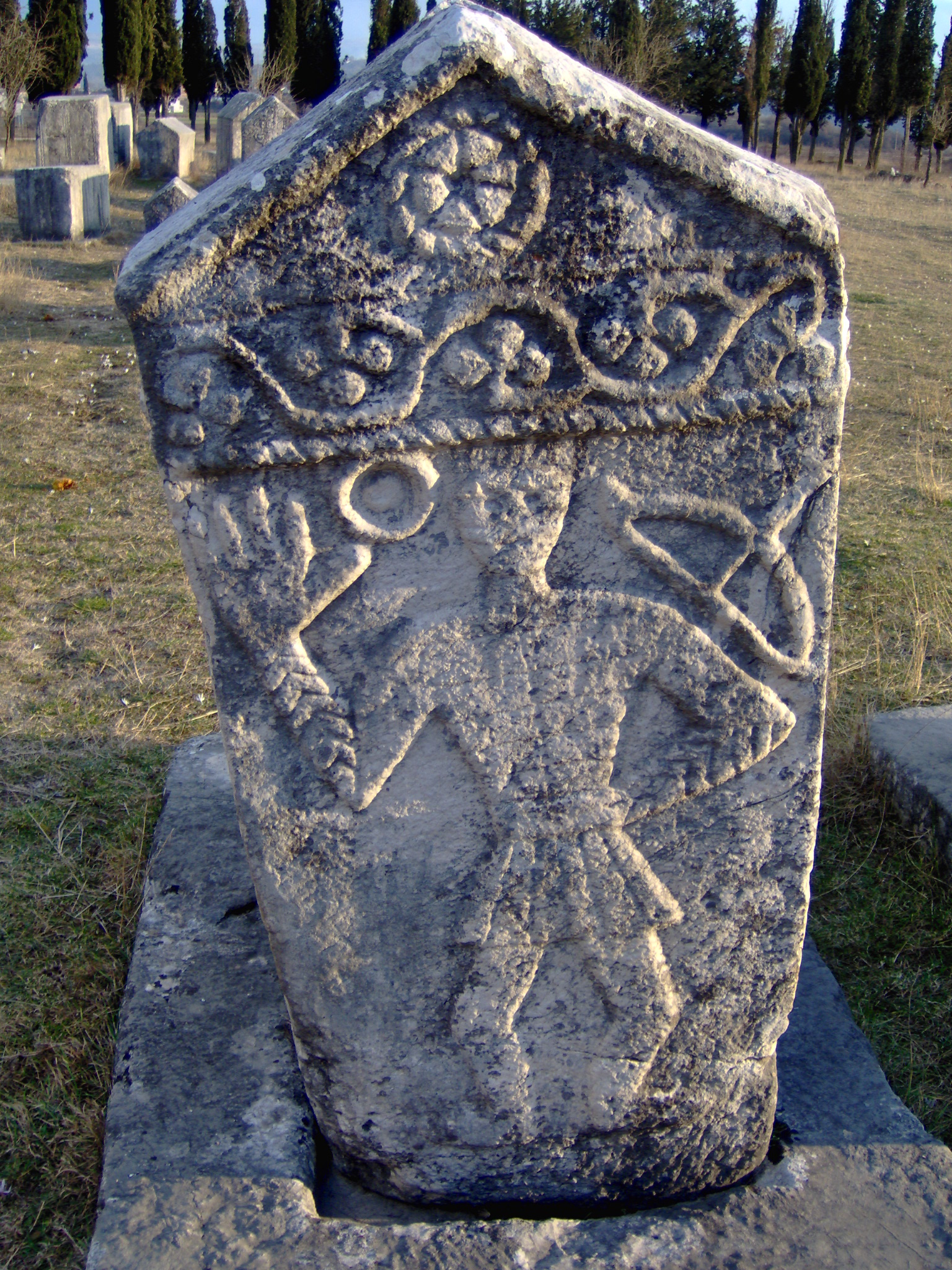
- Although gable-shaped with a slab pedestal is not the most represented form of stećak (9%), they are usually the most elaborately and richly decorated ones.
- Interactive map of Stećak

UNESCO World Heritage Site
- Official name: Stećci Medieval Tombstone Graveyards
- Type: Cultural
- Criteria: iii, vi
- Designated: 2016 (40th session)
- Reference no.: 1504
- Region: Europe and North America

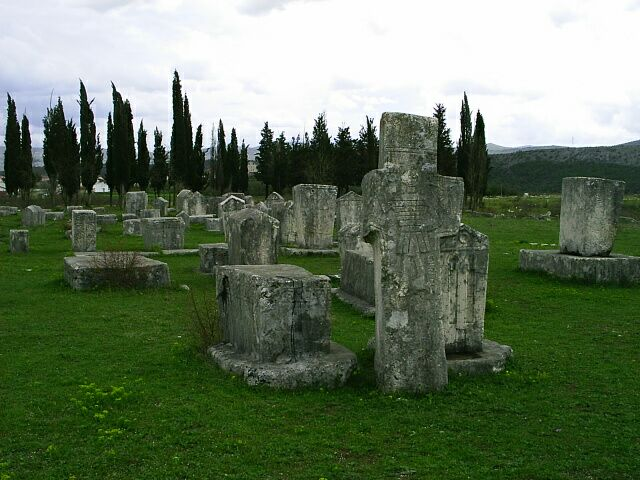
Stećci at Radimlja necropolis

Stećak (plural stećci; Serbian Cyrillic: стећак, стећци) is the name for monumental medieval tombstones that lie scattered across Bosnia and Herzegovina, and the border parts of Croatia, Montenegro and Serbia. An estimated 60,000 are found within the borders of modern Bosnia and Herzegovina and the rest of 10,000 are found in what are today Croatia (4,400), Montenegro (3,500), and Serbia (2,100), at more than 3,300 odd sites with over 90% in poor condition. They are cut in a variety of recognizable stećak forms, with a certain percentage being richly decorated and some individual stećci also containing inscriptions in form of epitaphs.

Appearing in the mid 12th century, with the first phase in the 13th century, the custom of cutting and using stećci tombstones reached its peak in the 14th and 15th century, before being discontinued in the very early 16th century during the Ottoman conquest of Bosnia and Herzegovina. They were a common tradition amongst Bosnian, Catholic and Orthodox Church followers alike, and were used by both Slavic and the Vlach populations.

On the territory of Bosnia and Herzegovina, all found individual and stećci grouped in necropolises are considered immovable heritage and most are already inscribed on one of the lists of the Commission to preserve National Monuments, whether on the List of National Monuments, Tentative List, or into List of Petitions. Stećci are also inscribed into World Heritage List by UNESCO since 2016, with a selection of some 4,000 individual monoliths, grouped in necropolises at 28 locations, of which 20 in Bosnia and Herzegovina, two in Croatia, three in Montenegro, and three in Serbia. One of the best preserved collections of these tombstones is Radimlja, west of Stolac in Bosnia and Herzegovina, while the Zgošća Stećak is one of the most representative individual examples of stećak found, in terms of its size, artistic processing and ornamentation.

== Etymology ==
The word itself is a contracted form of the older word *stojećak, which is derived from the South Slavic verb stajati 'stand'. It literally means 'tall, standing thing'. In Herzegovina they are also called mašeti or mašete (from Italian massetto 'big rock', or Turkish meşhet or mešhed 'tombstone of a fallen hero' (Note: Turkish word meşhed means a monument erected to Islamic dead martyr şehid. The issue with the derivation is that stećci are attributed to, for Islam, infidel Christians and Bogomils, term mašet can also be derived from Turkish maşatlik meaning "non-Muslim cemetery", term mašet is of male while mašeta is of female gender, which is specific for Muslims.)), in central and western Bosnia mramori, mramorje, or mramorovi 'marble', and in Serbia and Montenegro usađenik 'implantation'. On the stećci inscriptions they are called bilig 'mark', kamen bilig 'stone mark', kâm, kami, or kamen 'stone', hram 'shrine', zlamen 'sign', kuća 'house', raka 'pit', and greb or grob 'grave'. In the 1495 lectionary they are recorded as kamy 'stone'.

Although the name stećak is meant to represent high monolithic standing stones (i.e., the sanduk and sljemenjak form), in the 20th century the word stećak was accepted as a general term, including for plate tombstones (i.e., ploče). The original reference to the word stećak itself is uncertain and seems to be a modern invention as it can only be traced from the note by Ivan Kukuljević Sakcinski from 1851, the dictionary by Vuk Karadžić from 1852 (in the first edition from 1812 the term did not exist), although he contradicted himself because the common people from Zagvozd called them starovirsko 'of the old faith', the dictionary by Bogoslav Šulek from 1860, and so on, whereas academy dictionaries mention it only from 1956/58. It is believed that the term was usually used in East Herzegovina and in the area of Stari Vlah in Serbia. Until the very early 20th century there was wandering in terminology, and some scholars proposed general terms such as nadgrobni biljezi 'gravestone markers' and mramorje 'marble' as more appropriate.

The term stećak is uncommon in regional dialects and without etiological value, and semantically incorrect and contradictory because it derives from the verb meaning 'to stand', whereas the chest-type to which it refers predominantly is laid down, and another subtype of pillars and crosses is the one predominantly upright; this upright or standing subtype does not amount to even 5% of the overall number of stećci. In the original stećci inscriptions they are most often called as kami 'stone' (regardless of the form), thus some scholars proposed the term kamik (pl. kamici) for all forms of headstones, whereas stećak would mean only the upright subtype. The term kamik is closer to the original meaning and sometimes used instead of stećak in professional literature.

The stećci area or cemetery folk names show respect and admiration for their dimensions, age, or representations: divsko groblje 'giants' cemetery', mašete 'big stones', mramori or mramorje 'marble blocks', grčko groblje 'Orthodox cemetery', tursko groblje 'Muslim cemetery', and kaursko groblje 'Giaour cemetery'.

== Characteristics ==
=== Definition ===
They are characteristic of the territory of present-day Herzegovina, central Bosnia and Podrinje in Bosnia and Herzegovina, Dalmatia in Croatia, and minor parts of Montenegro, Kosovo, Western Serbia, Northwestern Bosnia, and Croatia (Lika and Slavonia).

Stećci are described as horizontal and vertical tombstones, made of stone, with a flat or gable-top surface, with or without a pedestal. The common classification was established by Dmitrij Sergejevski in 1952, who divided them into recumbent stećci and standing stećci. The systematization of stećci is not currently complete. According to Šefik Bešlagić, there are seven main shapes: slab, chest, chest with pedestal, ridge/gable, ridge/gable with pedestal, pillar, and cross; while according to Dubravko Lovrenović, there are nine types in Radimlja: slab, slab with pedestal, chest, chest with pedestal, tall chest, tall chest with pedestal, sarcophagus (i.e. ridge/gable), sarcophagus with pedestal, cruciform.

For instance, in Bosnia and Herzegovina, according to UNESCO, "about 40,000 chests, 13,000 slabs, 5,500 gabled tombstones, 2,500 pillars/obelisks, 300 cruciform tombstones and about 300 tombstones of indeterminate shape have been identified. Of these, more than 5,000 bear carved decorations".

The chronology established by Marian Wenzel assumes they developed from the plate headstones, the oldest one dating back to 1220 (the first were probably erected sometime in the mid-12th century), the monumental ones emerged somewhere around 1360, those with visual representations around 1435–1477, and that total production ended circa 1505. However, some consider that it lasted until the late 16th century, with rare examples that continued until the 18th century. Stećci in the form of a chest (sanduk) and ridge/saddle-roofed (sljemenjak) do not seem to have appeared before the middle or the end of the 14th century (1353-1477), while the remaining two basic forms – the upright pillar (stup) and cross (krstača / križina), no earlier than mid-15th century. In the case of the latter, upright or standing forms could be influenced by but also influence the nišan – the upright monolithic stones on top of Muslim (Turkish) graves–during stećak to nišan transition period, which had already emerged by the end of the 14th century in conquered parts of Macedonia and Serbia. This form is predominantly found in Serbia and Eastern Bosnia.

The initial stage of their development, which included simple recumbent plates or slabs isn't specific to the region, but it is of broad West Mediterranean origin, and as such the term stećak (implying the chest and ridge form) is misleading for all tombstone forms. The slabs were typical for a kind of burial in the West Mediterranean world of the 14th and 15th centuries, which had a special method of production and ornamentation in the Balkans, customized according to the stonemasonry skills and microenvironment. They were initially made by the feudal nobility who wanted to affirm individual prestige and power, sometimes also decorated with their coat of arms, while later this tradition was embraced and adopted by other social classes like the Vlachs who experienced socioeconomic growth and almost exclusively built them from the mid-15th century on.

=== Decorations ===
"I have for long lain here, and for much longer shall I lie"; "I was born into a great joy and I died into a great sorrow"; "I was nothing then, I am nothing now"; "You will be like I, and I can not be like you"; "May he who topples this stone be cursed"

— Some translated examples of inscriptions.

A fraction of stećci (384) bear inscriptions, mostly in Cyrillic, some in Glagolitic and Latin script. The observed Shtokavian dialect of Serbo-Croatian has some archaic phrases, mainly characterized by Ikavian while toward the end by Ikavian-Ijekavian yat reflex. The inscriptions can be roughly divided into those of: religious phrase, description of heroic death, information of the deceased, information of the deceased's relatives and circumstances of death, information with only a personal name (sometimes with smith-pupil name), and a moral (or religious) lesson. The last are mostly brazen reminders of wisdom and mortality, relay a dread of death, more anxiety than peace.

The most remarkable feature is their decorative motifs roughly divided into six groups which complement each other: social symbols, religious symbols, images of posthumous kolo, figural images, clear ornaments, and unclassified motifs (mostly symbolic, geometrical, or damaged). Many of them remain enigmatic to this day; spirals, arcades, rosettes, vine leaves and grapes, lilium, stars (often six-pointed) and crescent Moons are among the images that appear. Figural images include processions of deer, horse, dancing the kolo, hunting, chivalric tournaments, and, most famously, the image of a man with his right hand raised, perhaps in a gesture of fealty.

A series of visual representations on the tombstones can not be simplistically interpreted as real scenes from the life, and symbolic explanations are still considered by scholarship. The shield on the tombstones, usually with the crossbar, crescent and star, cannot be a coat of arms, neither can the stylized lilium be used in the heraldic sense. On one stećak a tied lion is displayed and above him a winged dragon. In 1979, historian Hadžijahić noted that the horsemen are not riding with reins, yet (if they are not hunting) their hands are free and pointed to the sky, implying possible cult significance. In 1985, Maja Miletić noted the symbolic and religious character of the stećak scenes. All the "life scenes" are considered to be part of a ceremonial. Several scholars concluded that the motifs, as well the tradition of a posthumous cult, show mixing of Romanized Illyrians and Early Slavs traditions with Christianity. Alojz Benac noted that the displays of a sole horse with a snake, as well a sole deer with a bird, symbolize the soul of the deceased going to the otherworld, which representations resemble those found on Iapodian artefacts. The Illyrian god Medaurus is described as riding on horseback and carrying a lance.

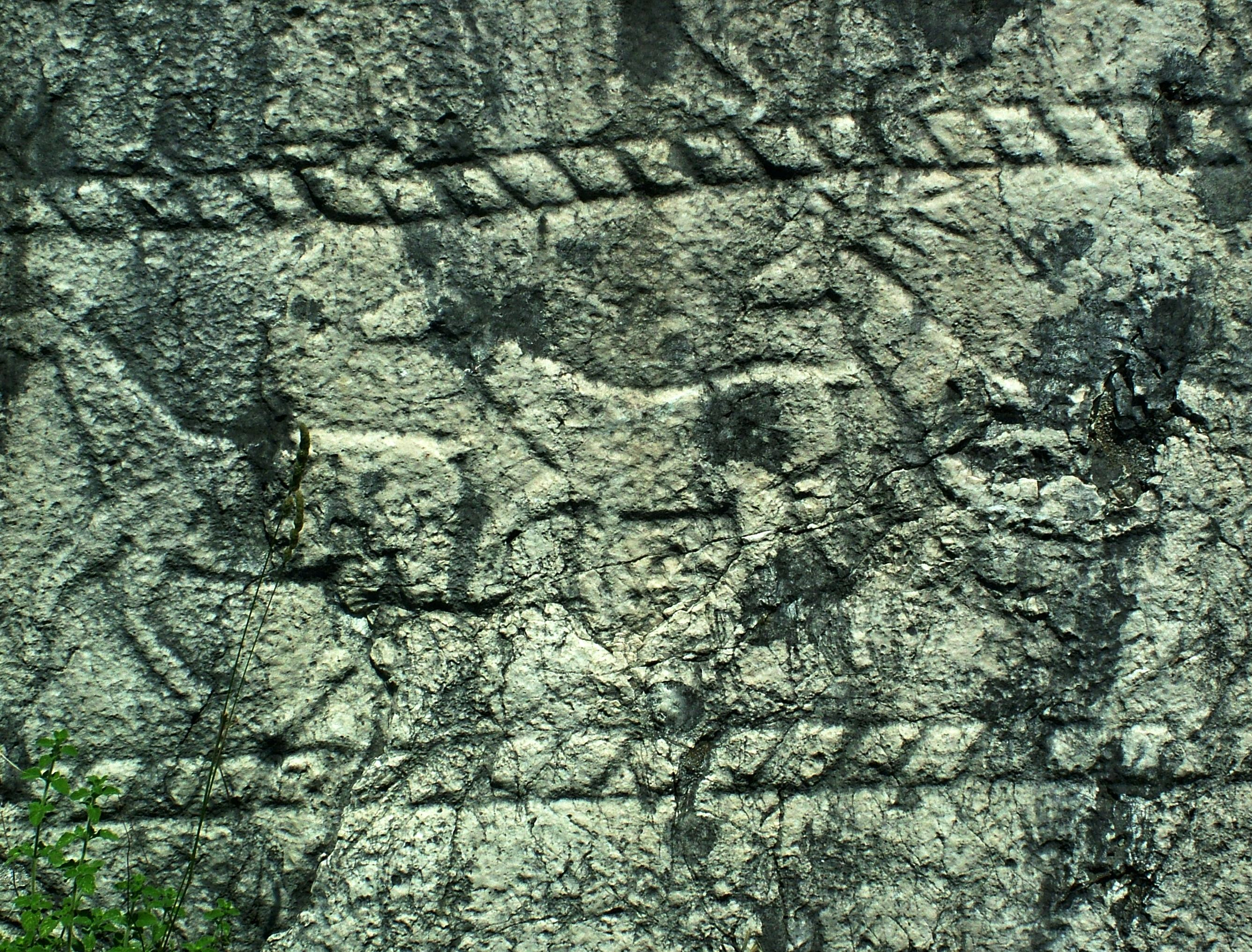
The sacral motif of deer is considered to be of Paleo-Balkan and pre-Christian origin.

Of all the animals, the deer is the most represented, and mostly is found on stećci in Herzegovina. According to Dragoslav Srejović, the spread of Christianity did not cause the disappearance of the old cult and belief in sacred deer. Wenzel considered that it led the deceased to the underworld. Historian Šefik Bešlagić synthesized the representations of deer: sometimes accompanied by a bird (often on the back or horns), cross or lilium, frequently are shown series of deer or doe, as well with a bow and arrow, dog and hunter(s) with a spear or sword (often on a horse). It is displayed in hunting scenes, as well as some kolo processions led by a man who is riding a deer. There scenes where deer calmly approach the hunter, or deer with enormous size and sparse horns. Most of the depictions of "deer hunting" are facing west, which had the symbolic meaning for death and the otherworld. In numerous hunting scenes, in only one deer is wounded (the stećak has some anomalies), indicating an unrealistic meaning. In Roman and Parthian-Sasanian art, hunted animals are mortally wounded, and the deer is only one of many, while on stećci it is the only hunted animal.

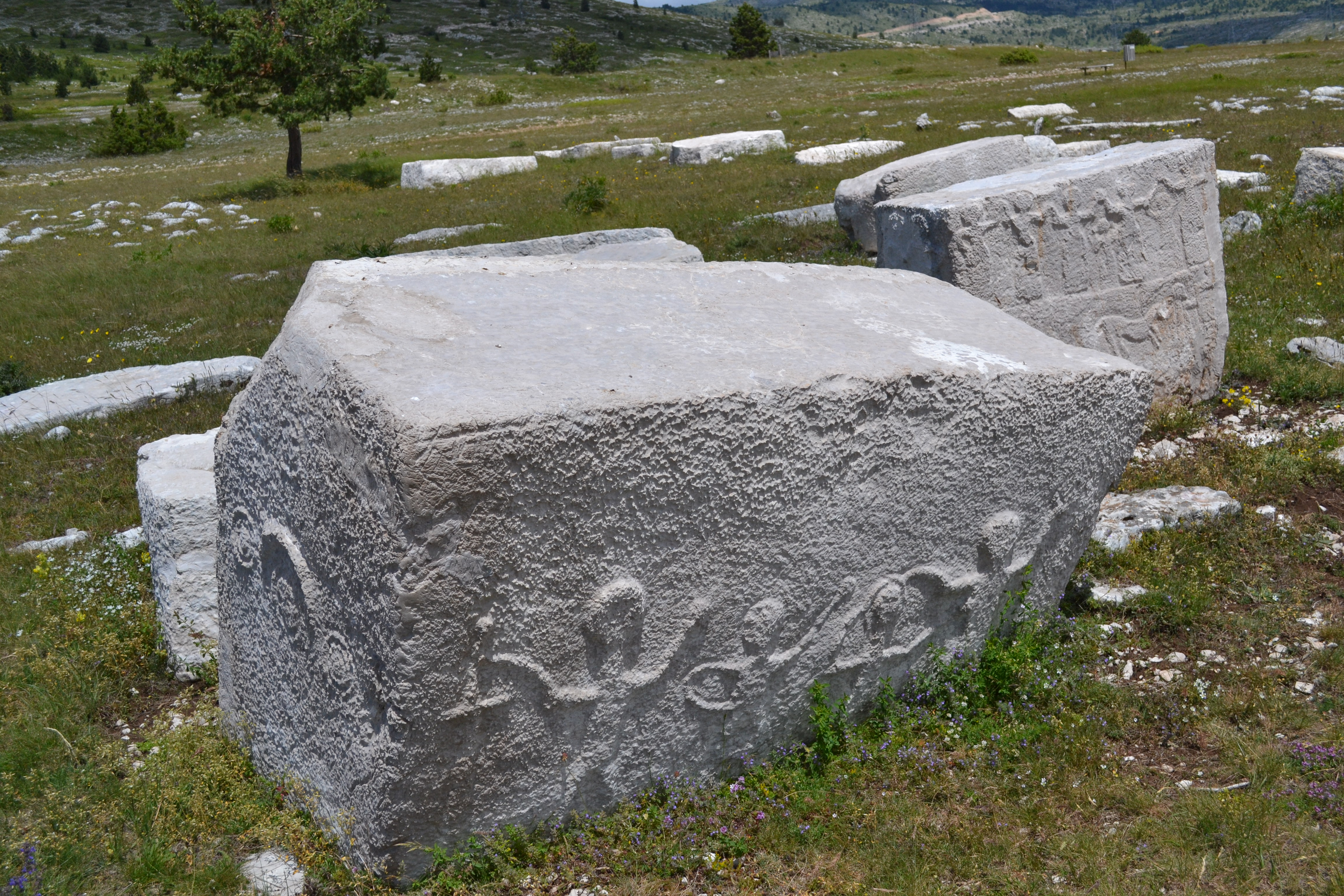
Two stećci with motifs of kolo

The motifs of a kolo (in total 132) procession, along with deer, and its specific direction of dancing, although not always easily identifiable, show it is a mortal dance compared to a cheerful one. In Eastern Bosnia and Herzegovina so-called Ljeljenovo kolo, (Note: See spring procession of Ljelje/Kraljice in Croatia with swords and flowers, similarly danced by Vlachs east of Beograd at the day of Pentecost. The etymological and cultural relation of jelen (deer), Ljelja and Ljeljo which are children of Perun, as well flower ljiljan (lilium) also called as perunika is still to be confirmed. Ivo Pilar noted that the use of name Ljeljen for hills in toponymy of Herzegovina and Eastern Bosnia is common.) with ljeljen local name for jelen (deer) implying jelenovo kolo, is danced by making the gate of the raised hand and the ringleader of these gates tries to pull all kolo dancers through them until the kolo is entangled, after that, playing in the opposite direction, until the kolo is unravelled. Its origin is in a mortuary ritual guiding the soul to another world and the meaning of the renewal of life.

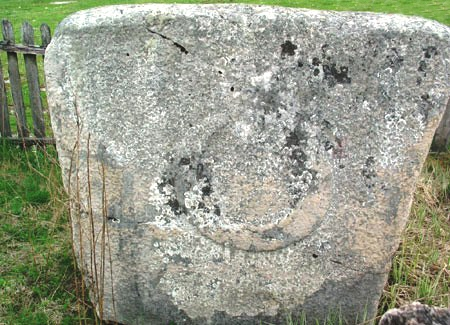
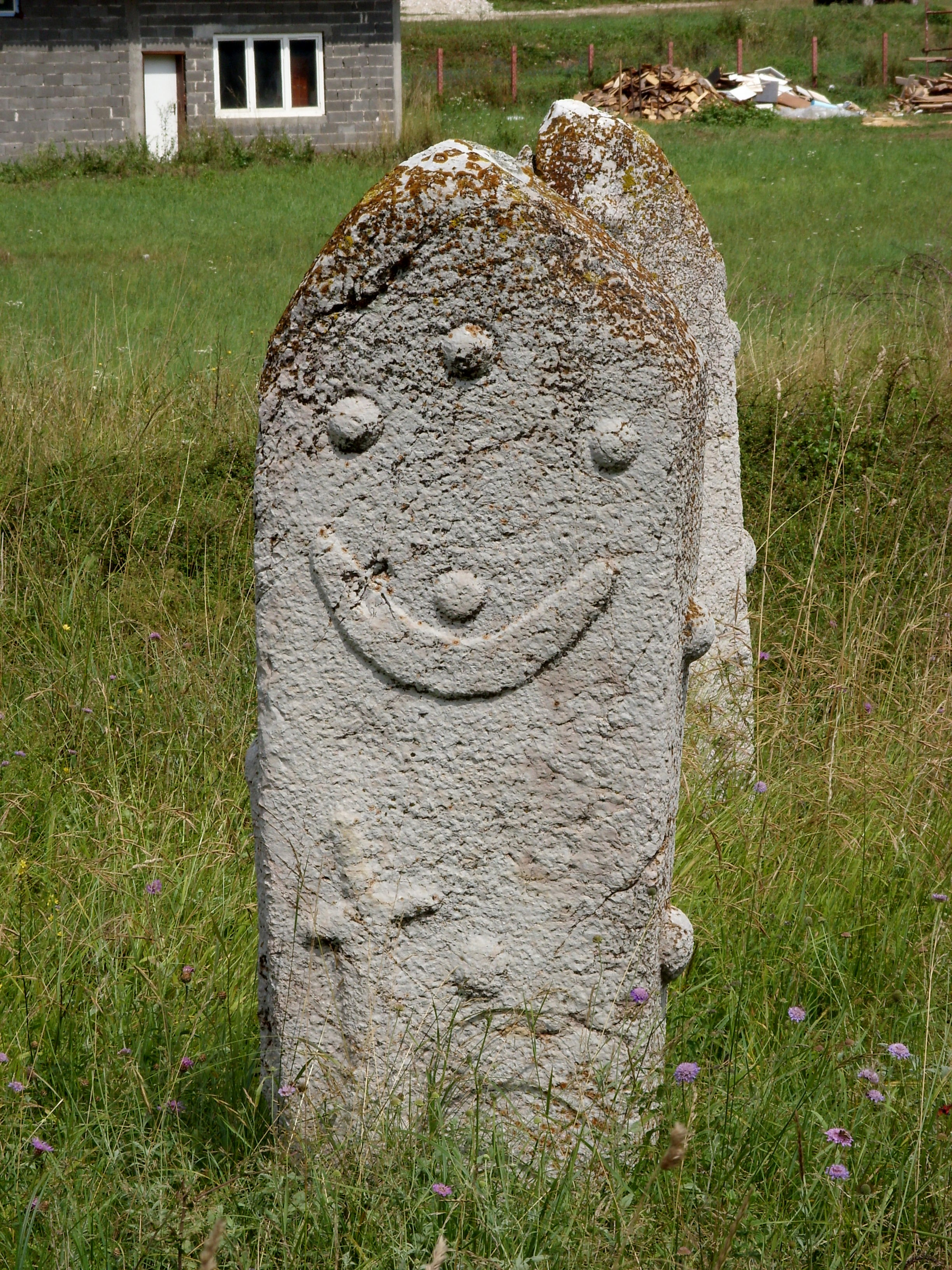
The crescent moon and star(s) are a very common motif on stećak tombstones.

The vast regional, but scarce (usually only one) in-graveyard distribution mostly in the center or some notable position of cross-type stećci (križine), and their almost exclusive ornament of the crescent Moon and stars, could indicate a cemetery label for specific (pagan) religious affiliation. The symbolism of the Moon and stars (Sun), which are often found on them, could be traced to a combination of pagan and Christian beliefs, six-pointed star represent Venus (in Slavic mythology called Danica) and the Moon could represent "astral marriage", or even Mithraism which had and old Mazdakism belief that the dead body goes to the Moon and the soul goes to the Sun, while some considered a connection between astral symbols with the position of celestial bodies at the time of death.

=== Carving ===
They were carved by a kovač / klesar (smith, mason; in Latin faber, "master"), while the inscriptions, probably as a template, were compiled by dijak / pisar (pupil, scribe). Currently 33 personal names of masons are known, among whom the most notable is Grubač due to his skills and being both a mason and scribe. He made four stećci in Boljuni and four stećci in Opličići near Stolac. The most notable scribe was Semorad who also worked around Stolac. It is believed that the masons studied the craft in Dalmatia and Ragusa, and those from the hinterland learned from them.

Stećci were mostly carved out of huge blocks, mostly of limestone. The location in the vicinity of a quarry was most significant for the cemetery. Some stećci weighed more than 29 tonnes, and it is supposed they were transported by horse or ox carriage and the heaviest with a combination of sledges and flat billets. They were placed directly above the pit, often in cardinal direction west–east, therefore so were the deceased. Seemingly it was related to the Sun path and was of importance that the dead watch the rising Sun.

Stećci in Bosnia and Herzegovina can be roughly divided into two stonemasonry schools: Herzegovian (sarcophagi with arcades, figurative scenes, a wealth of motifs) and East Bosnian (sarcophagi in the form of chalets, floral motives). The former had schools on the territory of Herzegovina, with the center being around Stolac, in the area of Trebinje and Bileća, Gacko and Nevesinje. The fourth workshop was in the area of Konjic, while the fifth around Lištica. The stonemasons center in Western Bosnia was between Kupres and Duvno, in Central Bosnia around Travnik, while in Eastern Bosnia there were four workshops, one between Kladanj, Olovo and Ilijaš, the second around Zvornik, the third in Ludmer, and the fourth around Rogatica.

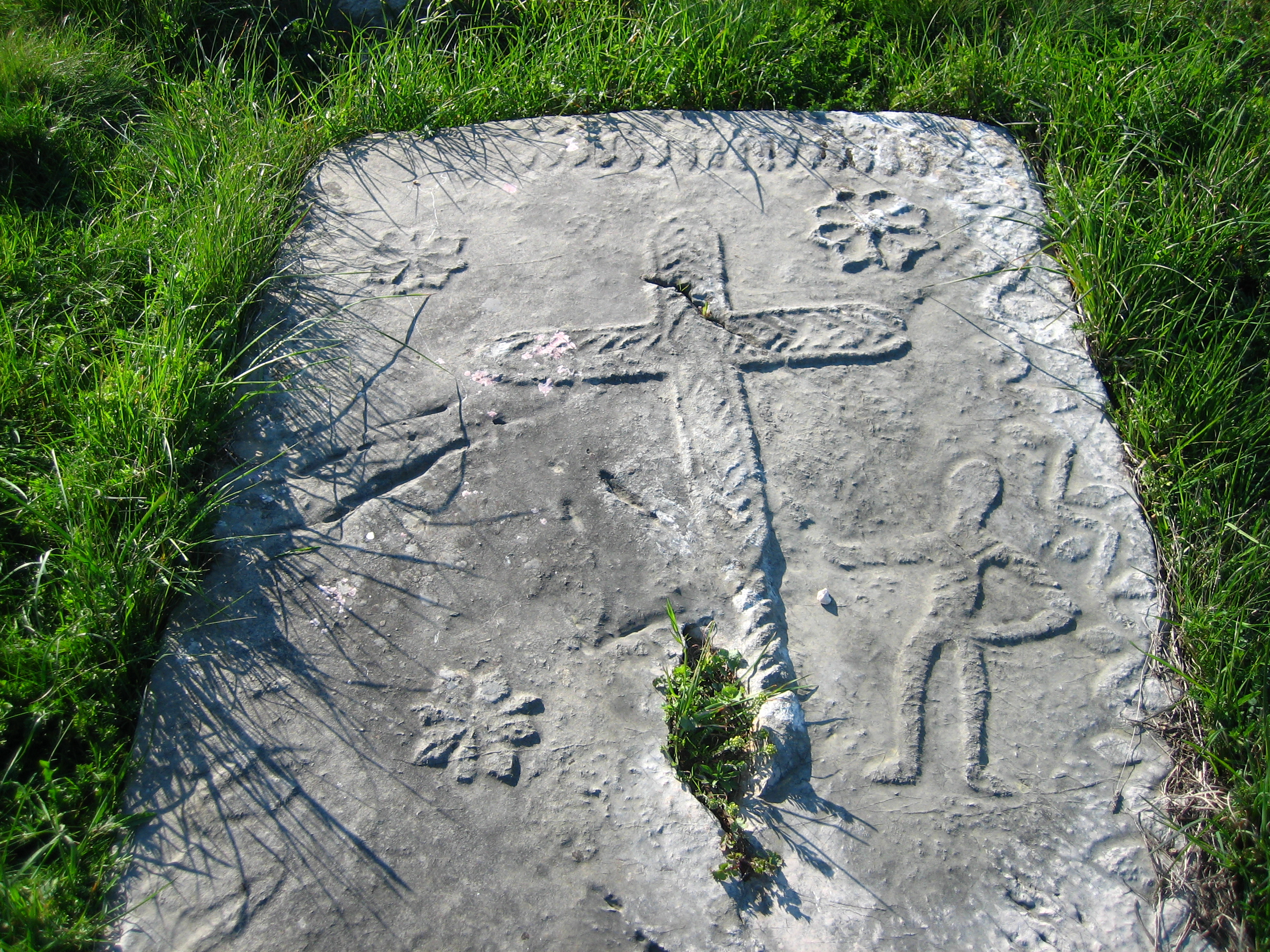
A slab stećak at Cista Velika

In Croatia there were supposedly two workshops, one in Cista Velika, and the other in Čepikuće. A local characteristic of stećci in the territory around Cetina river in Croatia is their rare ornateness, of which only 8-10% have simple decoration. Those from upper Cetina are smaller and by type and style relate to those from Knin and Livno, while those from mid Cetina are more monumental. Specific plate stećci were found in the village Bitelić which are decorated with an identical geometric ornament, not found in Dalmatia nor in Bosnia and Herzegovina, however by the nature of the ornament and surface treatment is considered a possible connection with several monuments near the Church of St. Peter in Nikšić, Montenegro.

In Montenegro they could have existed around Nikšić and in Glisnica and Vaškovo in Pljevlja Municipality. According to Bešlagić, in Serbia there were seemingly no specific centers, while masons were arriving from Bosnia and Herzegovina.

== Origin ==
There are different and still inconclusive theories on their cultural-artistic, religious and ethnic affiliation. According to a common thesis, especially represented by Bešlagić, stećci are an original Bosnian-Herzegovinian cultural-artistic medieval phenomenon. Some scholars like Milovan Gavazzi (1978) examined a much broader context, and considered their connection to megalithic tradition of the region and Eurasia from the prehistoric and contemporary periods. Some scholars considered that the chest form could have been inspired by Romanesque and Gothic houses from coastal cities, while the ridge form by medieval Christian sarcophagus or local Bosnian wooden houses. According to Lovrenović's synthesis it is part of a wider West Mediterranean origin and affiliation. It is established that they are mainly related to mountainous places which became deserted over a period of time because of migrations caused by new social events and the Ottoman occupation.

=== Religion ===
Since the middle of the 19th century, specifically the 1875 thesis by Arthur Evans, many scholars including Alexander Soloviev, Kosta Hörmann and Ćiro Truhelka have initially argued that they were related to the origin of the Bosnian Church i.e. Bogomils or other dualist groups. Others have asserted that the church was actually founded by Franciscan friars from the Catholic Church. However, Benac noted that the stećci were not built in the First Bulgarian Empire and that in Central Bosnia, where the centers of the Kingdom of Bosnia and the Bosnian Church were, were built in smaller numbers, as well as a higher number of stećci in poor condition, but also of older date. The exclusive relation between stećci and Bogomils was propagated from the late 19th century due to political and ideological reasons, like by Béni Kállay and Austro-Hungarian authorities who promoted post-Ottoman and pan-Bosnian identity since the 1878 Austro-Hungarian occupation, rather than scientific reasons. It was already questioned in 1899 by Kosta Hörmann, the first director of National Museum of Bosnia and Herzegovina. For almost a century it was a predominant theory in international historiography.

Since the mid-20th century many scholars like Marian Wenzel, once the world's leading authority on the art and artifacts of medieval Bosnia and Herzegovina, concluded that the stećci tombstones were a common tradition amongst Catholic, Orthodox and Bosnian Church followers alike. Wenzel's conclusion supported other historians' claims that they reflect a regional cultural phenomenon rather than belonging to a particular religious faith. Sometimes the inscriptions/motifs do reveal the confessional affiliation of the necropolis/deceased to one of the three Church organizations in medieval Bosnia and Zachlumia. This interconfessionality of stećci is one of their most remarkable features, and indicates a high degree of Christianization of the medieval Bosnian community. However, it is believed that there is not enough basis to be perceived as exclusively Christian.

Christian Gottlob Wilke sought origins of the symbolic motifs in old Mediterranean spiritual and religious concepts. Đuro Basler saw some parallels in the artistic expression of late Romanesque art, while symbolic motifs are divided into three components; pre-Christian, Christian and Manichaean (i.e. Bogomil). Bešlagić asserted that those who have raised and decorated them were not completely Christianized because they practiced the old custom of putting accessories with the dead, and many artefacts made of metals, textiles, ceramics and skin, coins, earrings of silver, gilded silver and solid gold have been found in graves beneath stećci. The customs like placing a coin in the mouth (Charon's obol), and placing a drinking vessel near graves and heads, are from ancient times. Tomb pits were mostly used for one burial, but sometimes were also used for two or more burials. Based on one stećak inscription in Montenegro, Bešlagić argued that there was a pre-Christian custom of re-burial, in which the bones were washed and returned to the pit.

=== Ethnic origin ===
The ethnic identity of stećci has not yet been fully clarified. Until now the most dominant, but still not widely accepted, theory relates them with the Vlach community in Bosnia and Herzegovina. Criticism of the theory argues that the monuments in original form weren't specific to Bosnia and Herzegovina, and were initially made by the feudal nobility and only in later stages embraced by the Vlachs. The Vlach population was so small, were profane and isolated, that the Vlachs in the Late Middle Ages were mostly a social-professional rather than an ethnic class, and that the mythological symbols are related to Old Slavic rather than "Vlach" pagan beliefs.

Bešlagić and others related them to the formation of the Bosnian Kingdom and especially Bogomils; however, the drawback of this theory is the fact that the Bosnian Kingdom's existence was presumably too short for a change in folk tradition, the Bosnian Church existed later and ended sooner than stećci, the Bosnian Church's area of influence can not be explained in coastal and Serbian lands, other Bogomils did not build them, many necropolises are located around contemporary church ruins as well as some stećci were secondarily embedded around churches and mosques, and that the Bogomils did not respect the symbol of the cross, yet on the stećci it is very common. Gradually it was "dismantled and discarded".

Some other scholars proposed unconvincing theories; Ivo Pilar (1918) ideologically argued the Croatian origin of medieval Bosnia, later Dominik Mandić considered them to be part of the ritual of the burial by the pagan Croats from the Red Croatia, Ante Škobalj similarly argued the Croatian theory. Non-monumentals around Cetina were identified as being Croats while monumental ones as being settled Vlachs. Vaso Glušac ideologically argued Serbian-Orthodox origin of both the Bosnian Church and stećci, while Vladislav Skarić considered they have represented the Old Slavic "eternal home", and that they initially were built from wood. Vladimir Ćorović pointed out that the "Old Slavs had not used monoliths or larger blocks of stone to make their dwellings, let alone for their graves, even less so for their writings or decorations".

==== Vlachs ====
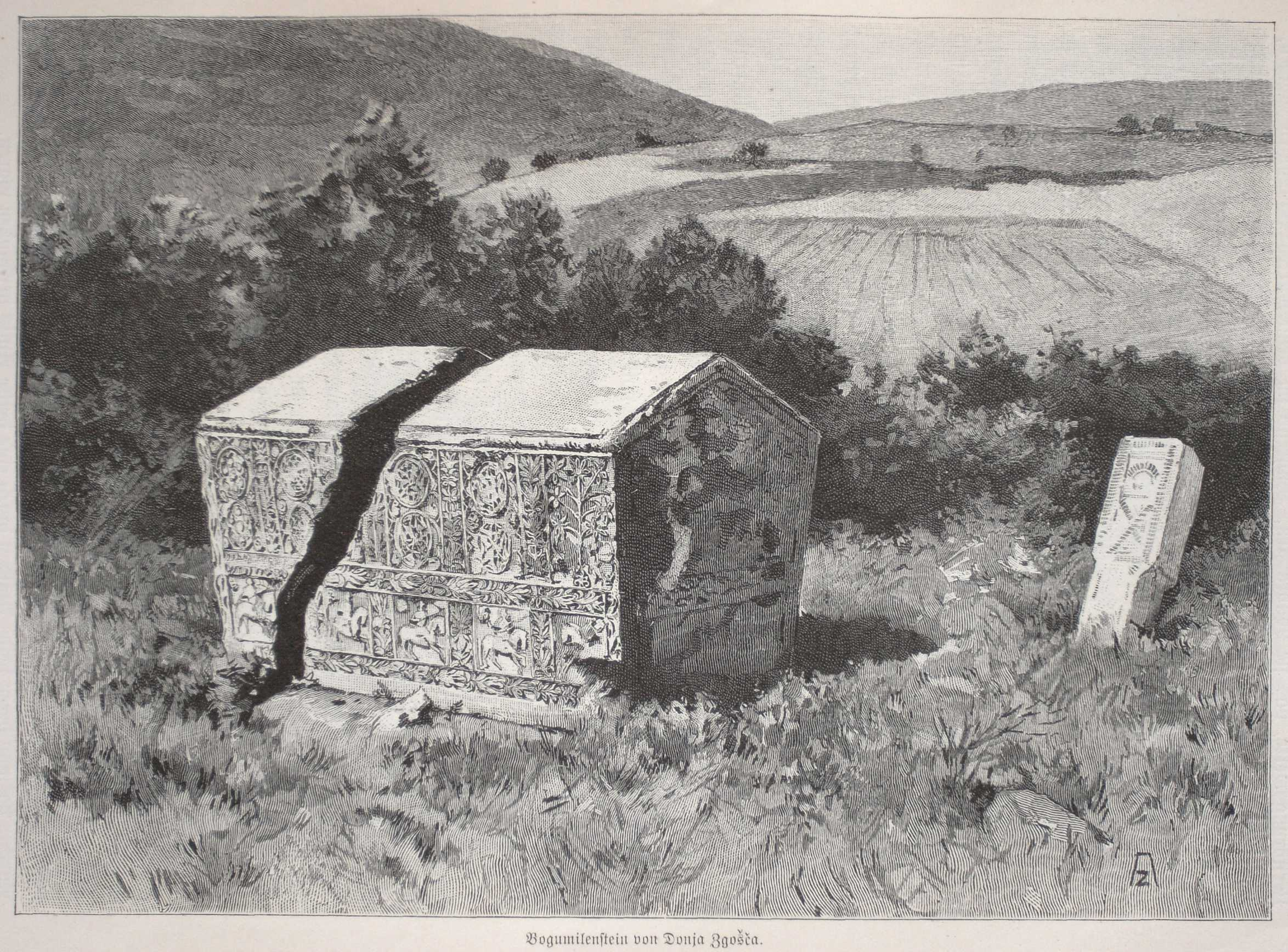
A broken stećak depicted by Hugo Charlemont, 1901. This appears to be the same stećak which is now exhibited at the National Museum of Bosnia and Herzegovina (see image above)

The "autochthonous" Vlach theory was proposed by Bogumil Hrabak (1956) and Marian Wenzel (1962). However, the theory is much older and was first proposed by Arthur Evans in his work Antiquarian Researches in Illyricum (1883). While doing research with Felix von Luschan on stećak graves around Konavle he estimated that a large number of skulls weren't of Slavic origin yet similar to older "Illyrian" peoples, as well noted that Dubrovnik memorials recorded those parts to be inhabited by the Vlachs until the 15th century. A study of inscriptions on the tombstones showed that individuals from Vlach tribes (like Vlahovići, Pliščići, Predojevići, Bobani, and Drobnjaci) were also buried beneath stećak graves.

Hrabak was the first scholar to connect the historical documents and their relation to the persons mentioned on rare inscriptions on stećci. In 1953 he concluded that the smith-stonemason Grubač from Boljun necropolis near Stolac built a stećak of Bogovac not later than 1477, and that most of the monuments of Herzegovinian Vlachs, and not only Herzegovinian and not only Vlachs, could be dated to the second half of the 15th century. Wenzel in one of her studies researched sixteen stećci with similar dating and historically known persons. She noted the possibility that initially the stone monuments as such could have been introduced by the feudal nobility in the mid-14th century, whose tradition was embraced by the Vlach tribes who introduced figural decoration. Wenzel related the end of stećak production to the Ottoman invasion and new social circumstances, with the transition of Vlachs and near Slavs to Islam resulting with the loss of tribal organization and characteristics of specific ethnic identity.

Sima Ćirković (1964) and Marko Vego (1973) argued that the emergence of stećci among Vlachs coincides with their social-economical rise, which had been confirmed in the region of Zachlumia where the most well known necropolis of Radimlja related to the Vlach family Miloradović-Stjepanović from genus Hrabreni is located. Financial possibilities of ordering such expensive ways of burials among Vlachs are supported and confirmed in historical documents, with an example of a Vlach from Cetina, Ostoja Bogović, who in 1377 paid the cost of a burial of a Vlach Priboja Papalić for 40 libra. At the time a burial in Split costed 4-8 libra, while for a sum of 40 libra a family grave in the church of Franciscan order in Šibenik could be bought.

Benac concluded that the distribution of stećci in the lands at the right Cetina riverbank, in the parts of Dalmatian Zagora, while they are absent in the lands left of the river (with graveyards along Early Middle Age churches), show these tombstones in those parts belonged to the Vlach communities. The triangle between Šibenik, Trogir and Knin, as well as the surroundings of Vrlika and Trilj, which were the main centers of Vlachs, have the most number of stećci in Dalmatia. In 1982, Benac noted that the highest concentration of them is in South Herzegovina (territory of Trebinje, Bileća, Ljubinj and Stolac), where there had been a high concentration of Vlachs. Some of the stećci inscriptions (by anthroponyms) clearly relate them to some Vlach chieftains; Tarah Boljunović from Boljun-Stolac, Vukosav Vlaćević from Vlahovići-Lubinje, Hrabreni and Miloradović in Radimlja-Stolac, as well as other distinctive members from Vlach groups like Bobani, Pliščići, Predojevići, Drobnjaci and to such chieftains belong finest monuments.

The occurrence of stećci in the Cetina county is related to the Nelipić noble family efforts to return economic and political power, who had Knin confiscated in 1345 by king Louis I of Hungary in exchange for Sinj and Cetina county. They thrived with the support from the Vlachs, who for their service were rewarded with benefits and common Vlach law. After many conflicts and the death of the last noble Nelipić, then Ivan Frankopan, Vlachs supported Stjepan Vukčić Kosača. The ridge stećci of Dalmatian type can be found only in regions of Dalmatia and Southwestern Bosnia, parts ruled by the Kosača noble family. It was in his interest to settle militant and well-organized Vlachs in the riskiest parts of his realm, to defend from Talovac forces in Cetina and Venetian forces in Poljica and the coast. Thus the Dalmatian type is found only to the west and south of the Kosača capital Imotski, and later also the north after the Fall of Bosnia. Archeologically, some Middle Age burials from Cetina county have local specifics by which Cetina county differs from other parts of Dalmatia. In the county, the burials were not done in the ground without additional stone architecture. Some scholars related this phenomenon to the specific ethnic identity; however, due to still groundbreaking research, for now, it is considered only a regional and narrow local occurrence.

Anthropological research in 1982 on skeletons from 108 stećak graves (13th-14th century) from Raška Gora near Mostar, as well some from Grborezi near Livno, have shown homogeneity, with clean Dinaric anthropological type, without other admixtures, presumably indicating an autochthonous Vlach population of non-Slavic origin. The research of 11 skeletons from the necropolis at Pavlovac near Prača, often attributed to the Pavlović noble family, also have shown clean Dinaric type, indicating Vlach origin, although historical sources do not call Pavlovići as Vlachs. The anthropological research in 1991 on the 40 skeletons from 28 burials (dating back to 1440-1450s) beneath stećci at the Poljanice plateau near the village of Bisko showed that the vast majority of the population belonged to the presumably autochthonous Dinaric type and are of non-Slavic origin. 21 skeletons belonged to children, while out of 19 adult skeletons, 13 belonged to males. The quarry for stećci was found in the Northwestern part of the plateau, with one ridge being semi-finished work without any ornament. Although autochthonous Vlach origin has been argued since Illyrian times it rather shows the continuation of the process of Dinarization and assimilation of Slavs, a characteristic which could be general and not ethnic. The Dinaric ethnic type is also common in other parts of Europe especially Ukraine and was perceived by some as a Slavic type besides the fact that such racial anthropology terminology and methodology is of scientifically highly dubious accuracy and relevancy today. Archaeological artifacts are even more inconclusive because they don't differenate them from graves without tombstones. In 2019 and 2021 studies of late medieval stećak archaeological necropolises Kopošići near Ilijaš and Divičani near Jajce, six samples belonged to the Y-DNA haplogroup I2a1b3 and one to R1a, showing continuity between medieval and modern Bosnian and Herzegovinian population. Two of the decorated skeletal remains could indicate identity of the Bosnian noblemen Mirko Radojević and his son Batić Mirković who served the Bosnian King Tvrtko I.

== Legacy ==
One of their enigmas is the fact they were not mentioned in local or foreign medieval documents. Franciscan chronicles which recorded many unusual things, like Turkish cemeteries, did not mention them. Folk tradition preserved a mythical perception full of superstitions and fantasy tales. This implies the occurred discontinuity of historical memory among all three ethnic groups, caused by ethnic migrations and religious conversions during the Ottoman occupation. It is considered that the first itinerary mention of stećci was by Benedikt Kuripešić from 1530. Evliya Çelebi in 1626 described them as tombstone monuments of some unknown heroes. The oldest local author to mention them is Andrija Kačić Miošić in the mid-18th century. Alberto Fortis in his work Travels into Dalmatia (1774) recorded them in the Romanticist spirit of that time, describing the tombstones in Cetina as warrior graves of giants. They also attracted attention by Aleksander Antoni Sapieha, Ami Boué, Otto Blau, John Gardner Wilkinson and Heinrich Sterneck.

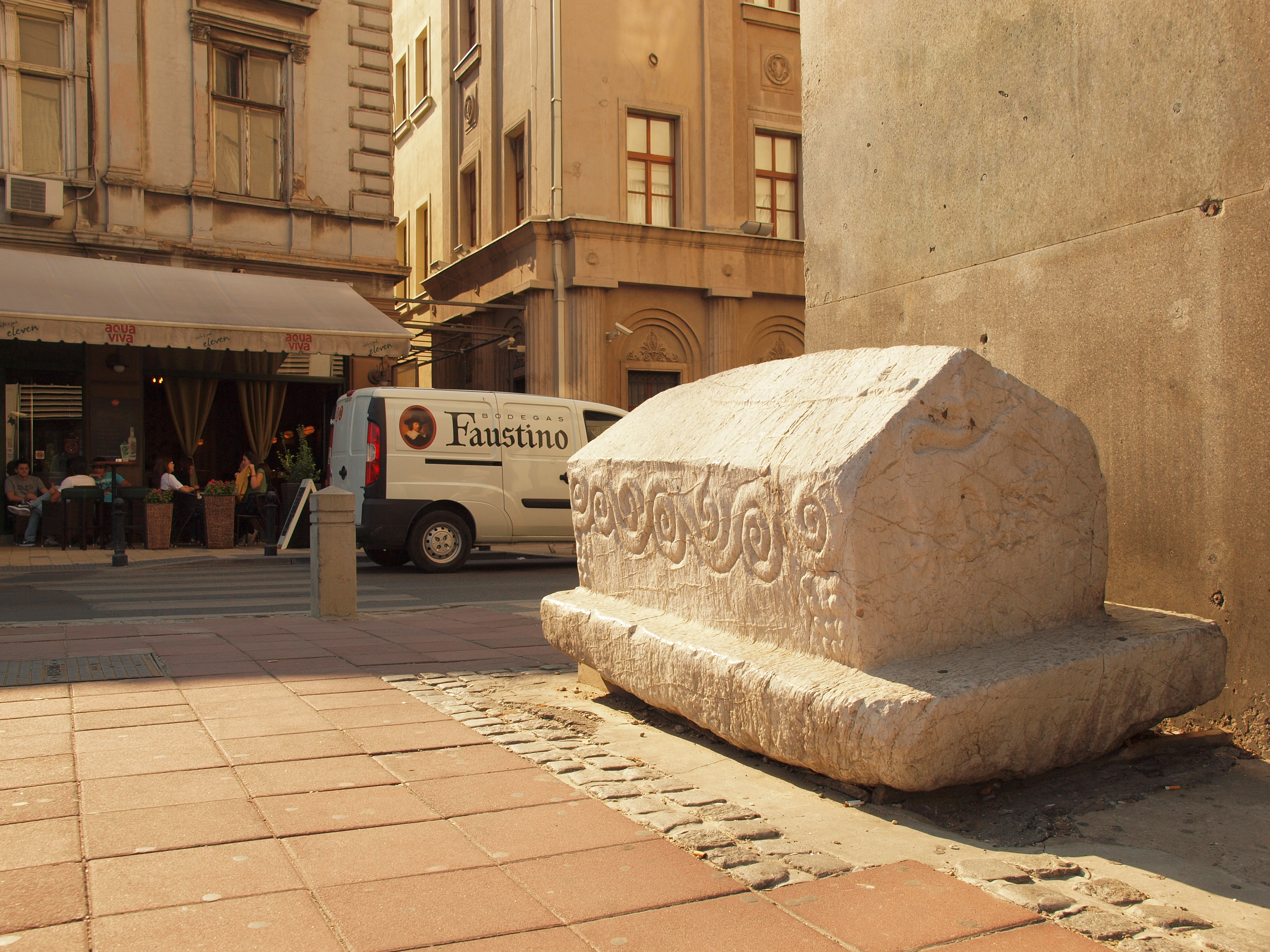
A stećak in front of the Ethnographic Museum, Belgrade

Since the second half of the 19th century, stećci are seen as a symbol of Bosnia and Herzegovina, being objects of South Slavic ideological ethno-national building myths and ownership, as well as different opinions on their archaeological, artistic and historical interpretation. The breakup of Yugoslavia and the Bosnian War (1992–1995) caused a resurgence of Bosnian, Croatian and Serbian nationalism, in which all three ethnic groups tried to appropriate them as part of their own culture exclusively. Paradoxically, none of these groups in Bosnia and Herzegovina, (Bosniaks, Bosnian Serbs and Bosnian Croats), originally remember stećci in their collective consciousness, leaving them to deteriorate in nature or to human carelessness and destruction which at least halved the number of stećci. This attitude alone implies how such appropriation is based on an ideological construct. According to Marian Wenzel one of the three pervasive ethno-national ideological constructs, specifically the thesis about the Bogomil origin of stećci, dates as far back as the last decade of the 19th century when it had been put forward by the Austria-Hungarian bureaucracy, namely by a member of the Hungarian parliament Janos von Asboth, in correlation to a similar thesis on the origin of Muslim inhabitants of Bosnia and Herzegovina as descendants of the Bogomils. Such distortion of history will later attract criticism by scholars like Wenzel, who stated that through this particular example Austria-Hungarian authority practically delivered stećci "as a gift to Muslims, emphasizing their inheritance rights to the land and implying that the later Christians, comparatively, were the 'newcomers'". During the war of the 1990s this theory would again have its resurgence in media and public discourse, seeking the historical-political legitimacy in which Islamization of the local Bosnian and Herzegovinan populace was not only caused by the Ottoman occupation but also by ingrained religious idiosyncrasy, epitomized in Bogomilsm, thus affirming the ethnic and confessional differences between the Bogomil, Catholic and Orthodox populations. However, it did not make a significant influence on the scientific thinking nor the scholarship and comparative research in Bosnia and Herzegovina, nor elsewhere.

Europe's first public presentation of stećci is attributed to the Polish-born Russian immigrant and Yugoslav diplomat, Alexander Soloviev (1890–1971). He wrote about them in the accompanying prospectus of the Paris exhibition "Medieval Art of the People of Yugoslavia" (1950). The first regional public presentation was held in 2008 at Klovićevi Dvori Gallery, and represented an example of encouraging public dialogue between the four nations.

=== In art and popular culture ===
As a tombstones, the stećci showcase an artistic style and techniques that combined symbolism of abstract with narrative imagery, making the carvings both decorative and symbolic, thus evoking themes of mortality, spirituality, and communal values. Stećci have influenced later traditions, and different art forms emerged drawing an inspiration from stećci. They are source of inspiration for sculptors, painters, poets, filmmakers, writers, musicians and photographers.

In poetry, renowned Bosnian poet Mehmedalija Mak Dizdar, who hailed from Stolac, region famous for its necropolises, inspired by stećci draw heavily on their symbolism, inscriptions and engraving art. He wrote several collections, and in 1966 published Kameni spavač (Eng=The Stone Sleeper), which is considered a masterpiece of literature. Another collection of poetry is Stećci – oblici bosanskih duša (Eng=Tombstones – shape of Bosnian soul) by Nenad Tanović, published in 1995.

Tošo Dabac, Croatian photographer, extensively documented stećci across Bosnia and Herzegovina, creating the most comprehensive photographic records of the stećci with thousands of artistic and documentary photographs.

In sculpture, the Bosnian artist, Adis Fejzić, has also draw inspiration from stećci. One of his sculptures, a modern interpretation titled B&Hierophany@terraAvstralis.MMXIII, is on permanent display at Parliament House in Canberra, Australia.

Stećci have also inspired the works of illustrator and designer Aleksandra Nina Knežević, who makes stećci-based illustrations for different projects, Denis Drljević, a coppersmith from Mostar, and fashion artis, Vedrana Božić, who runs the art and craft gallery in Mostar. Nevena Nikolić, the artist from Sarajevo, making a jewelry inspired by stećak tombstones since 2013.

Montenegrin artist and professor Anka Burić, a member of the Montenegrin Academy of Sciences and Arts, contributed artistic work whose focus is on the study of stećci, with her exhibition Imprint of Time, presented in the Gallery of the Montenegrin Academy of Sciences and Arts.

Historian Gorčin Dizdar (the grandson of poet Mak Dizdar) wrote a book about stećak and promotes them and the culture of Bosnian and Herzegovina through maintaining a foundation and the website Mak Dizdar Foundation. Miroslav Krleža wrote a series of essays on medieval Bosnian culture including stećaks.

Inscription and phrases on stećci are in itself a form of epigraphic literature of Bosnia and Herzegovina, significant for history of literacy and literary language, and historical dialectology.

=== In other media ===
Postage stamps are issued with motifs from stećci. A deck of table cards, designed by the Bosnian-American artist Saša Crkvenjaš, featuring different stylized motifs and imagery from the tombstones are created.

== Protection ==
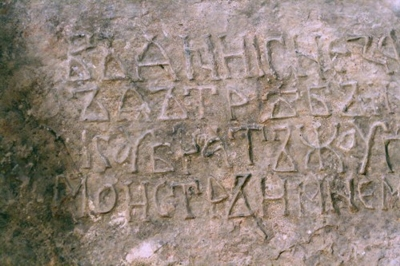
The inscription on the stećak of Grdeša from the 12th century, considered the oldest one found

=== Notable stećci ===
Stećci are commonly concentrated in groups: in cemeteries of individual families with few specimens, in cemeteries of whole families with approximately 30 up to 50 specimens, big necropolises of rural districts occasionally with several hundred specimens. Examples of family necropolises are Grčka Glavica of the Sanković noble family in the Biskup hamlet in Glavatičevo near Konjic, of the Miloradović-Stjepanović noble family (Hrabreni) in Radimlja near Stolac, of the Pavlović noble family near Sarajevo, and Zgošća Stećak and Zgošća Column of an unknown family (probably Kotromanić but also Vukčić-Hrvatinić are proposed) at Donja Zgošća near Kakanj. Today many stećci are also displayed in the yard of the National Museum of Bosnia and Herzegovina in Sarajevo. The medieval Mramorje necropolis in Serbia is part of the Monument of Culture of Exceptional Importance and contains a large number of stećak tombs. Some other notable or studied individual stećci:

- It is believed that the oldest known stećak is that of Grdeša, a 12th-century župan of Trebinje.
- It is believed that the oldest known stećak with an inscription is that of Marija, the wife of the priest Dabiživ, with an inscribed number and presumed year — 1231, from Vidoštak near Stolac.
- Certain Vlatko Vuković's grave, often confused with the Grand Duke of Bosnia, lies marked near the village of Boljuni near Stolac, Bosnia and Herzegovina, from the late 14th century. The inscription on the grave was written in Bosnian Cyrillic in Ikavian.
- The two ridge stećci which belonged to Jerko Kustražić and his wife Vladna from the mid 15th century, in Cista near Imotski, and Split, Croatia
- The ridge stećak of Vlkoj Bogdanić (son of Radmil) who died in battle in the mid 15th century, made by the mason Jurina, in Lovreć, Croatia

=== UNESCO locations ===
Locations of the UNESCO World Heritage sites "Stećci Medieval Tombstones Graveyards")

ID	Name	Location	Coordinates
1504-001	Radimlja	Stolac (Bosnia and Herzegovina)	43°05′32″N 17°55′27″E
1504-002	Grčka Glavica	Biskup, Konjic (Bosnia and Herzegovina)	43°29′48″N 18°07′18″E
1504-003	Kalufi	Krekovi, Nevesinje (Bosnia and Herzegovina)	43°18′48″N 18°11′47″E
1504-004	Borak	Burati, Rogatica (Bosnia and Herzegovina)	43°50′13″N 18°53′04″E
1504-005	Maculje	Novi Travnik (Bosnia and Herzegovina)	44°03′02″N 17°40′30″E
1504-006	Dugo polje	Blidinje, Jablanica (Bosnia and Herzegovina)	43°39′48″N 17°32′35″E
1504-007	Gvozno	Kalinovik (Bosnia and Herzegovina)	43°33′28″N 18°26′18″E
1504-008	Grebnice in Radmilovića Dubrava,	Baljci, Bileća (Bosnia and Herzegovina)	42°54′17″N 18°27′52″E
1504-009	Bijača	Ljubuški (Bosnia and Herzegovina)	43°07′45″N 17°35′37″E
1504-010	Olovci	Kladanj (Bosnia and Herzegovina)	44°17′16″N 18°38′52″E
1504-011	Mramor	Musići, Olovo (Bosnia and Herzegovina)	45°06′26″N 18°31′15″E
1504-012	Kučarin	Hrančići, Goražde (Bosnia and Herzegovina)	43°40′57″N 18°45′34″E
1504-013	Boljuni	Stolac (Bosnia and Herzegovina)	43°01′40″N 17°52′29″E
1504-014	Dolovi	Umoljani, Trnovo (Bosnia and Herzegovina)	43°39′19″N 18°14′13″E
1504-015	Luburića polje	Sokolac (Bosnia and Herzegovina)	43°57′28″N 18°50′34″E
1504-016	Potkuk	Bitunja, Berkovići (Bosnia and Herzegovina)	43°06′36″N 18°07′44″E
1504-017	Bečani	Šekovići (Bosnia and Herzegovina)	44°19′40″N 18°50′42″E
1504-018	Mramor	Vrbica, Foča (Bosnia and Herzegovina)	43°23′25″N 18°56′35″E
1504-019	Čengića Bara	Kalinovik (Bosnia and Herzegovina)	43°25′15″N 18°24′07″E
1504-020	Ravanjska vrata	Kupres (Bosnia and Herzegovina)	43°51′48″N 17°18′46″E
1504-021	Velika i Mala Crljivica	Cista Velika (Croatia)	43°30′55″N 16°55′38″E
1504-022	St. Barbara	Dubravka, Konavle (Croatia)	42°32′30″N 18°25′21″E
1504-023	Grčko groblje	Žabljak (Montenegro)	43°05′41″N 19°08′57″E
1504-024	Bare Žugića	Žabljak (Montenegro)	43°06′00″N 19°10′00″E
1504-025	Grčko groblje	Plužine (Montenegro)	43°20′30″N 18°51′00″E
1504-026	Mramorje	Perućac, Bajina Bašta (Serbia)	43°57′28″N 19°25′49″E
1504-027	Mramorje	Rastište, Bajina Bašta (Serbia)	43°56′45″N 19°21′13″E
1504-028	Grčko groblje	Hrta, Prijepolje (Serbia)	43°17′56″N 19°37′28″E

== Gallery ==
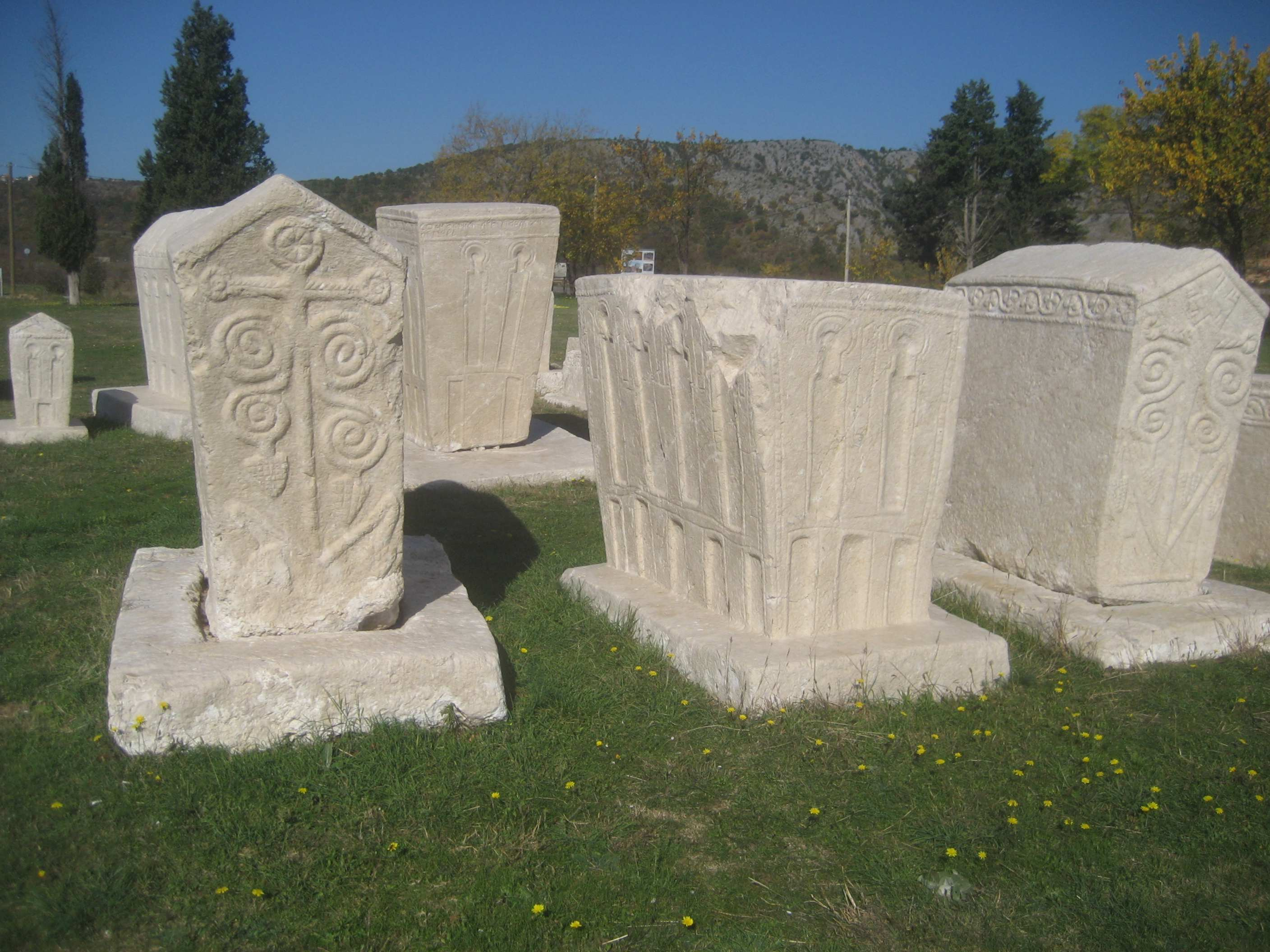
Radimlja necropolis, Bosnia and Herzegovina

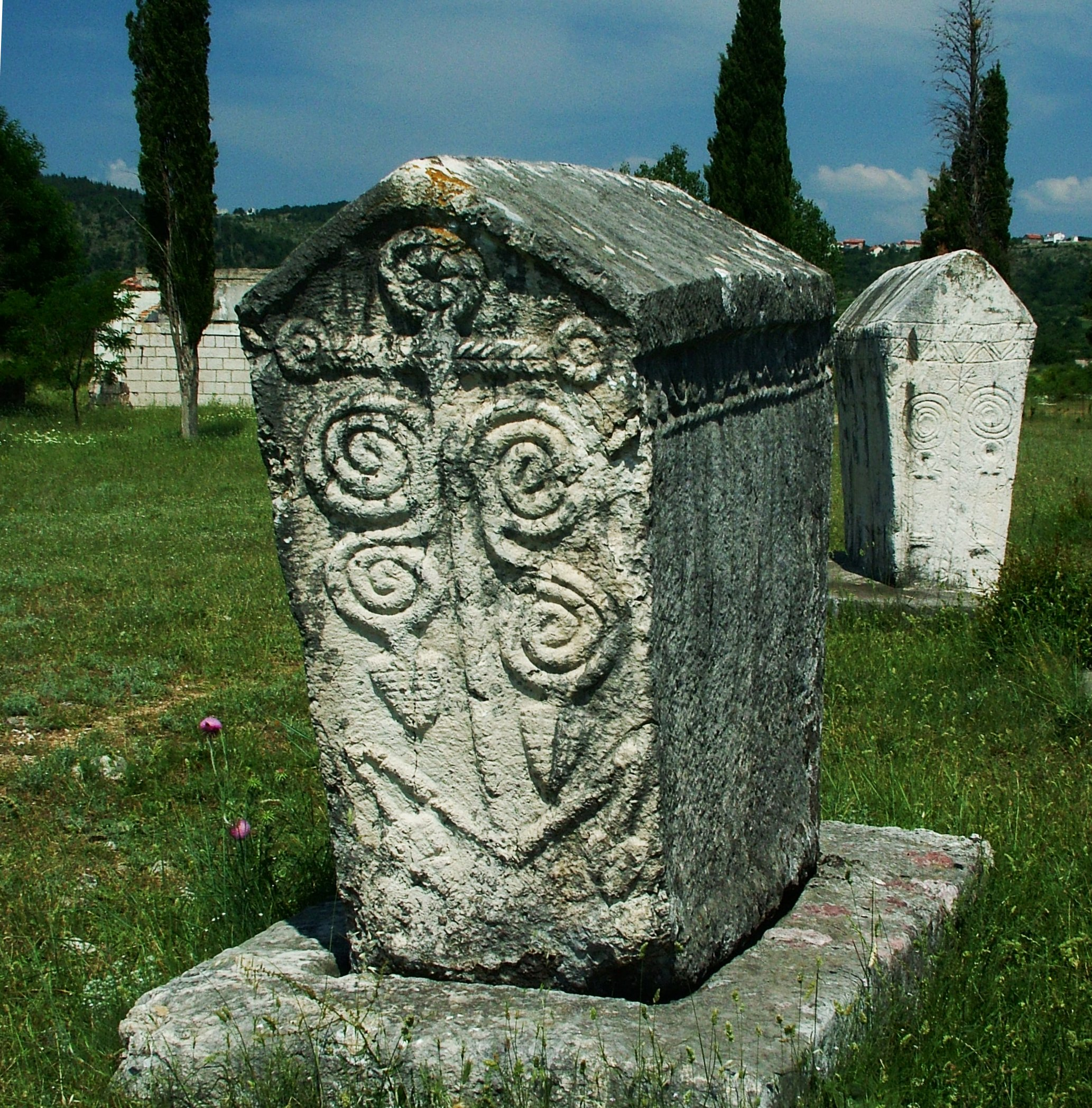
Radimlja, Bosnia and Herzegovina

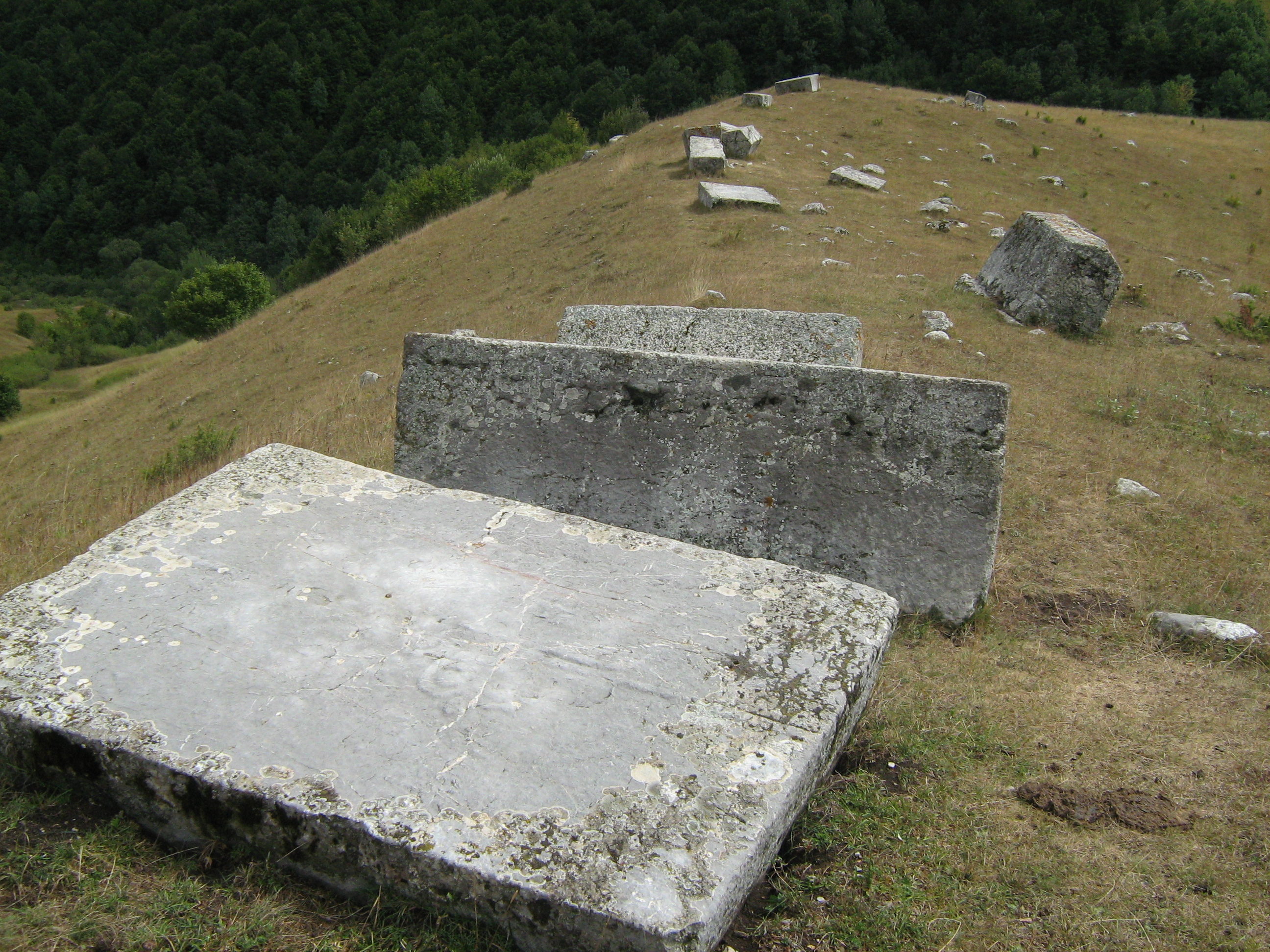
Umoljani, Bosnia and Herzegovina

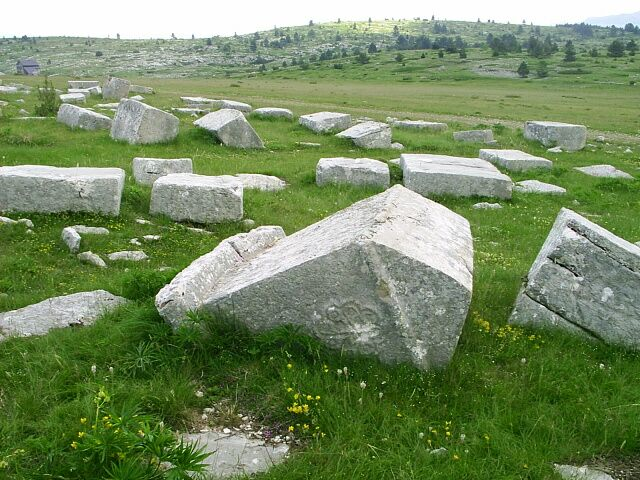
Dugo polje, Bosnia and Herzegovina

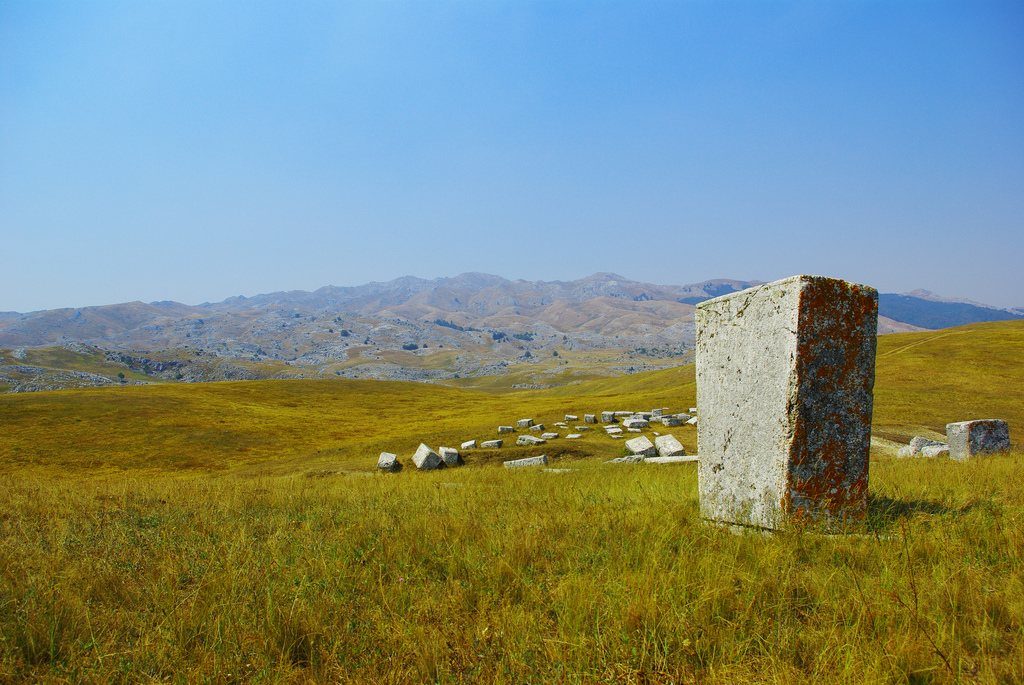
Morine, Bosnia and Herzegovina

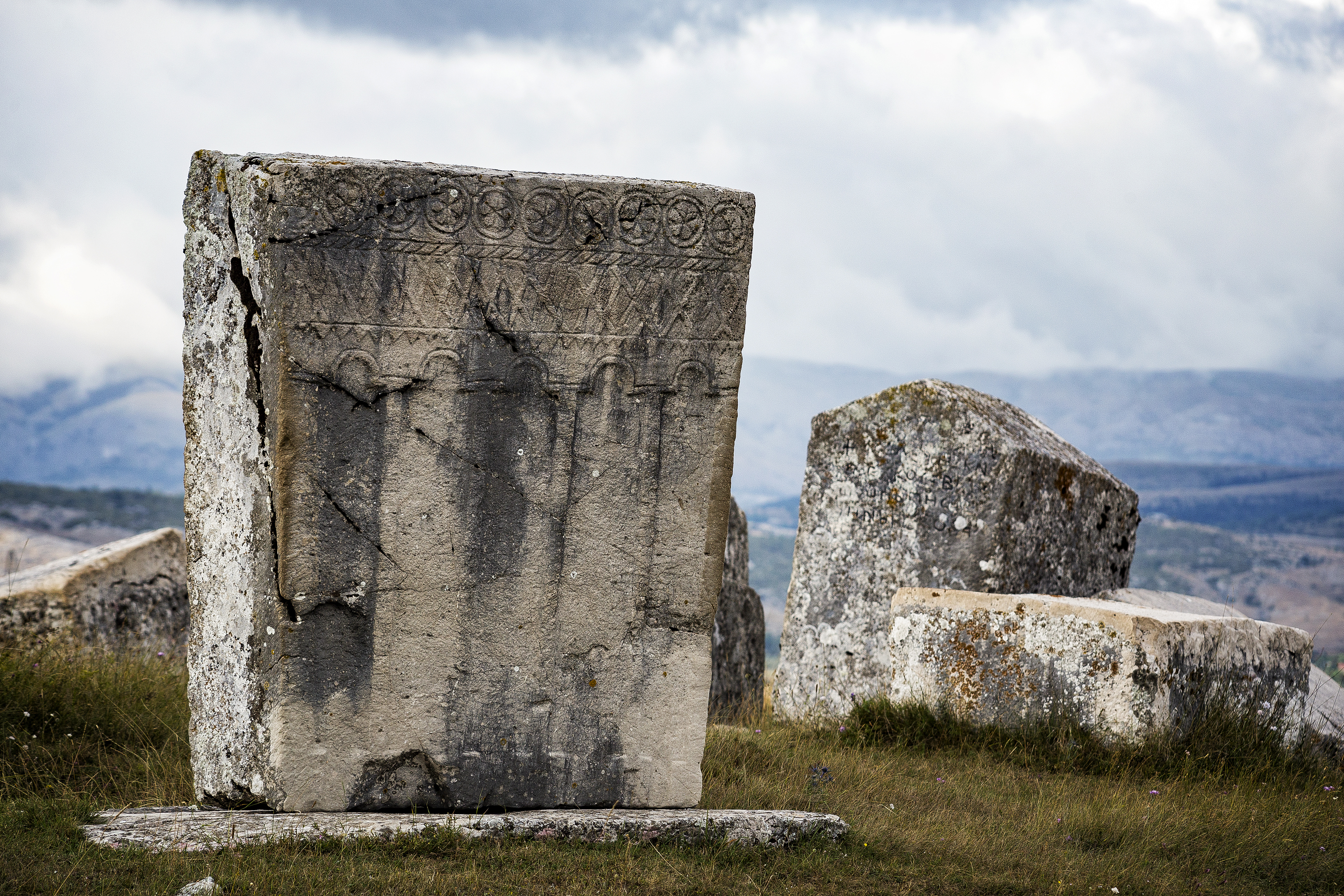
Velike Grebenice, Bosnia and Herzegovina

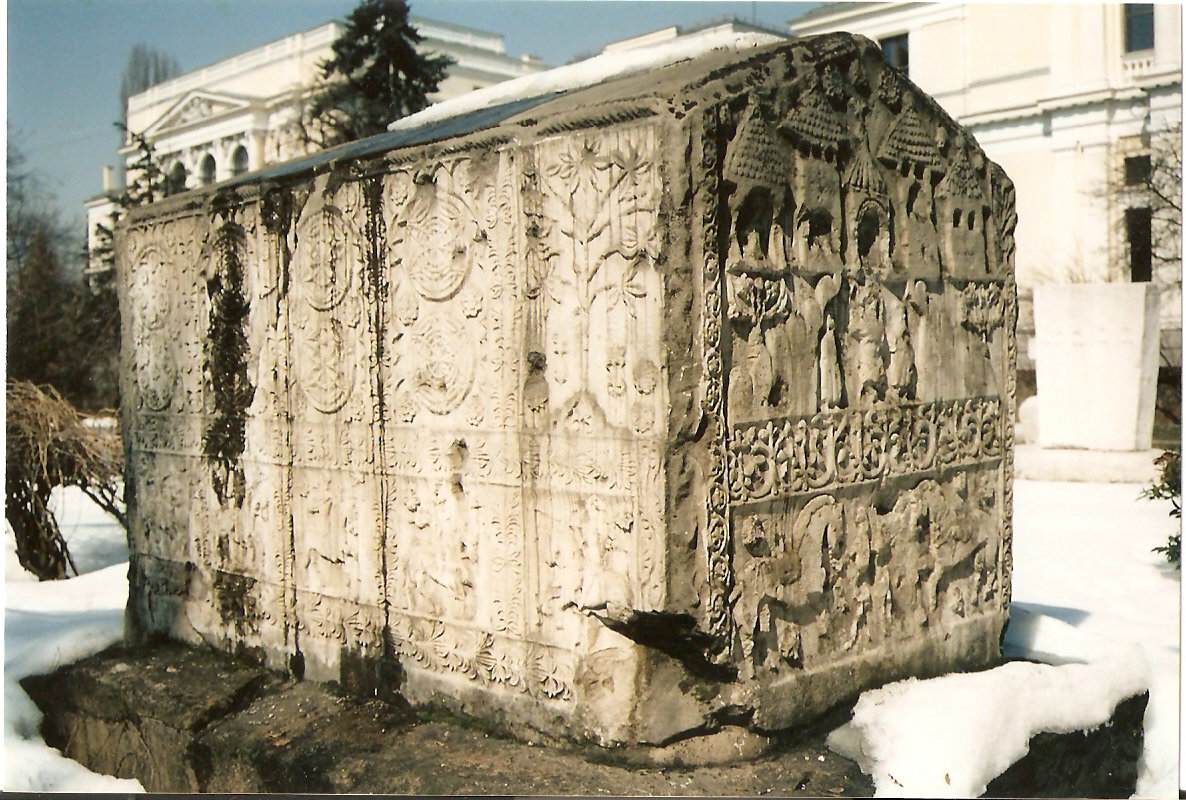
Sarajevo, Bosnia and Herzegovina

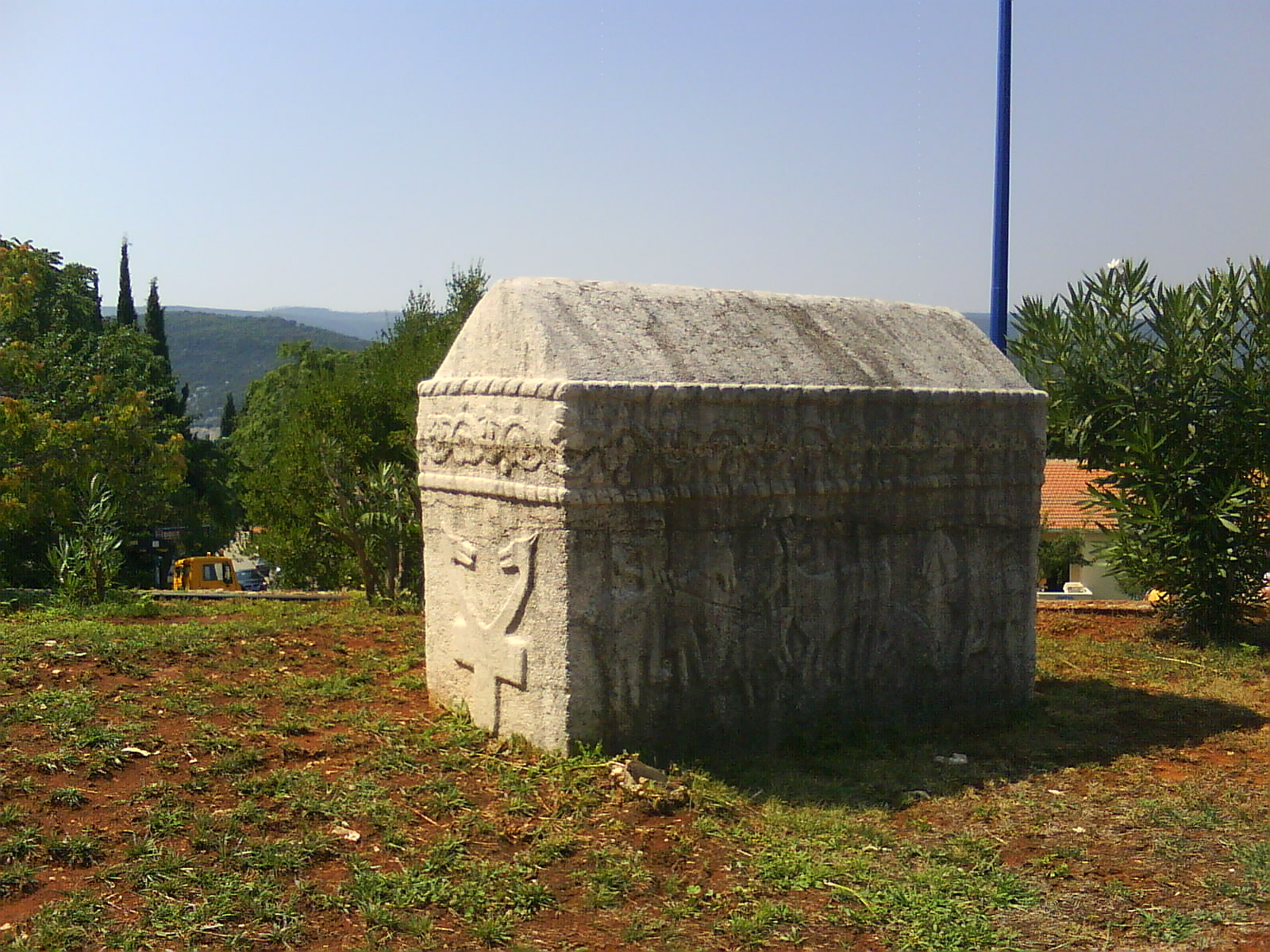
Neum, Bosnia and Herzegovina

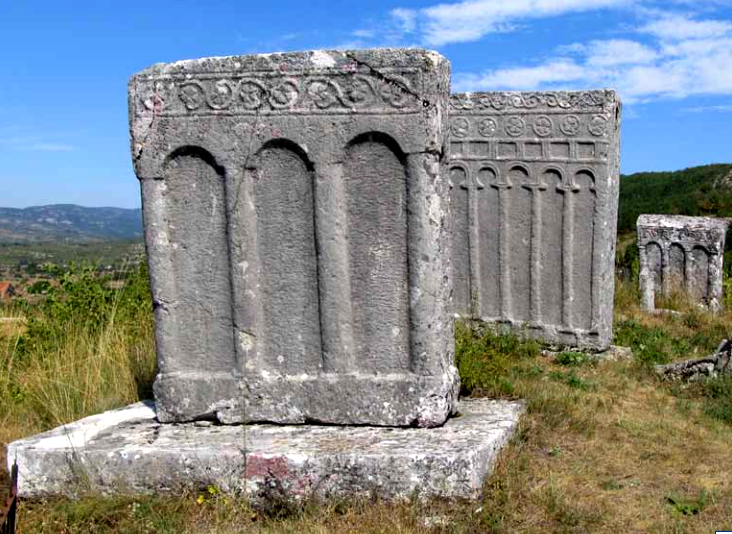
Velimlje, Montenegro

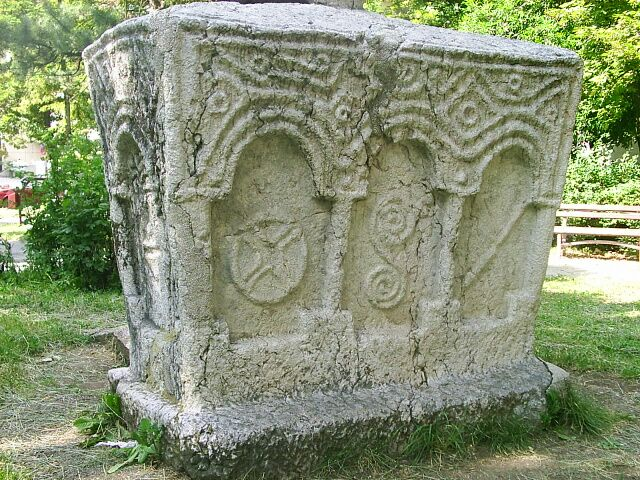
Cetinje, Montenegro

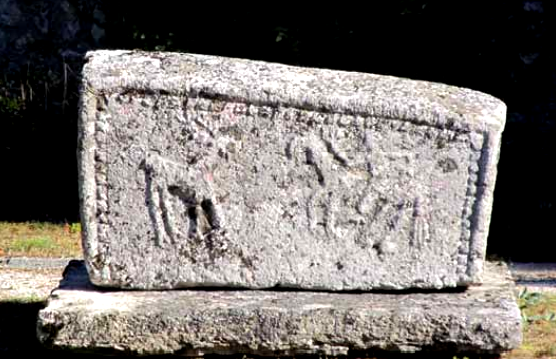
Klenak, Montenegro

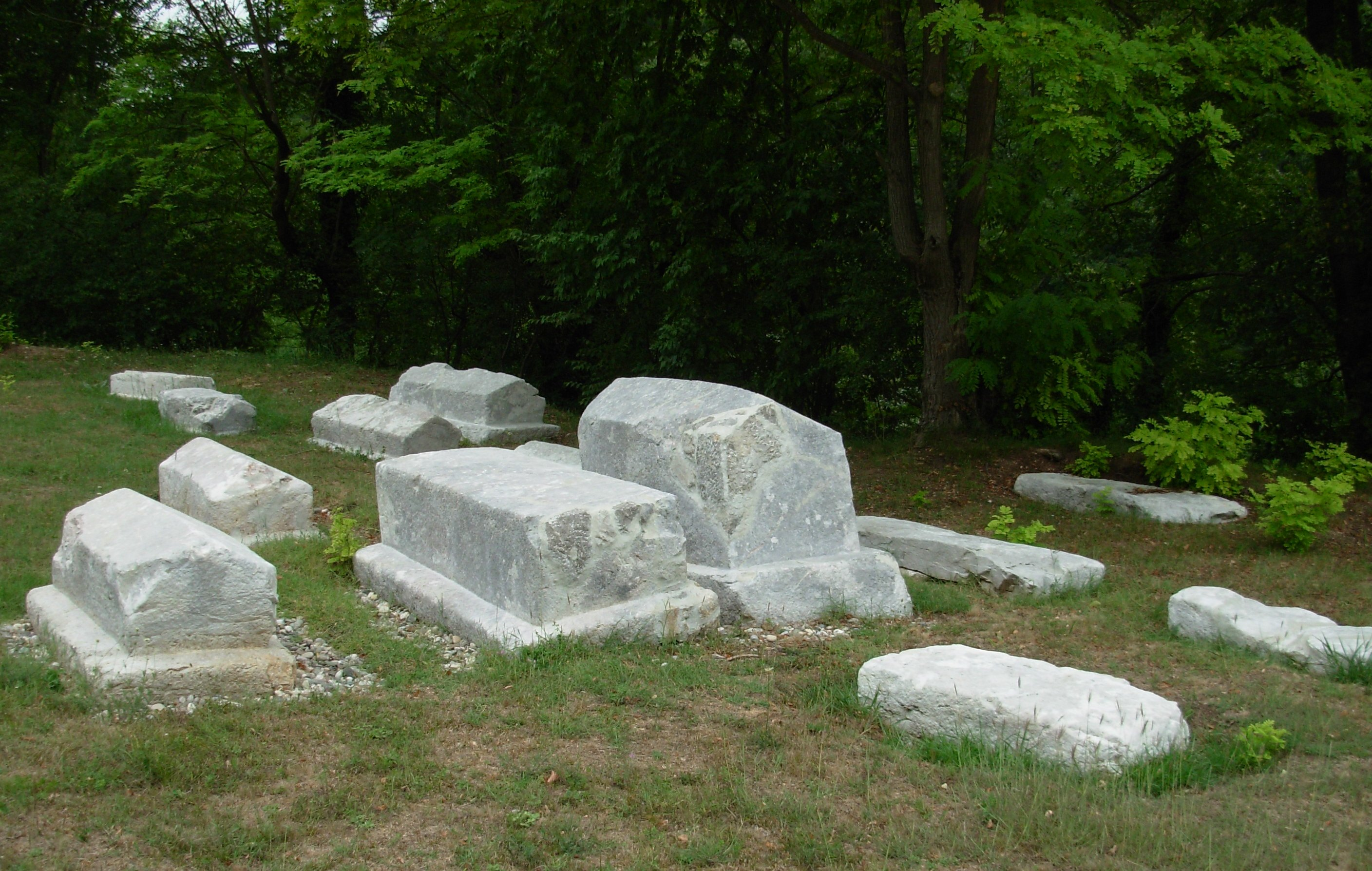
Mramorje, Serbia

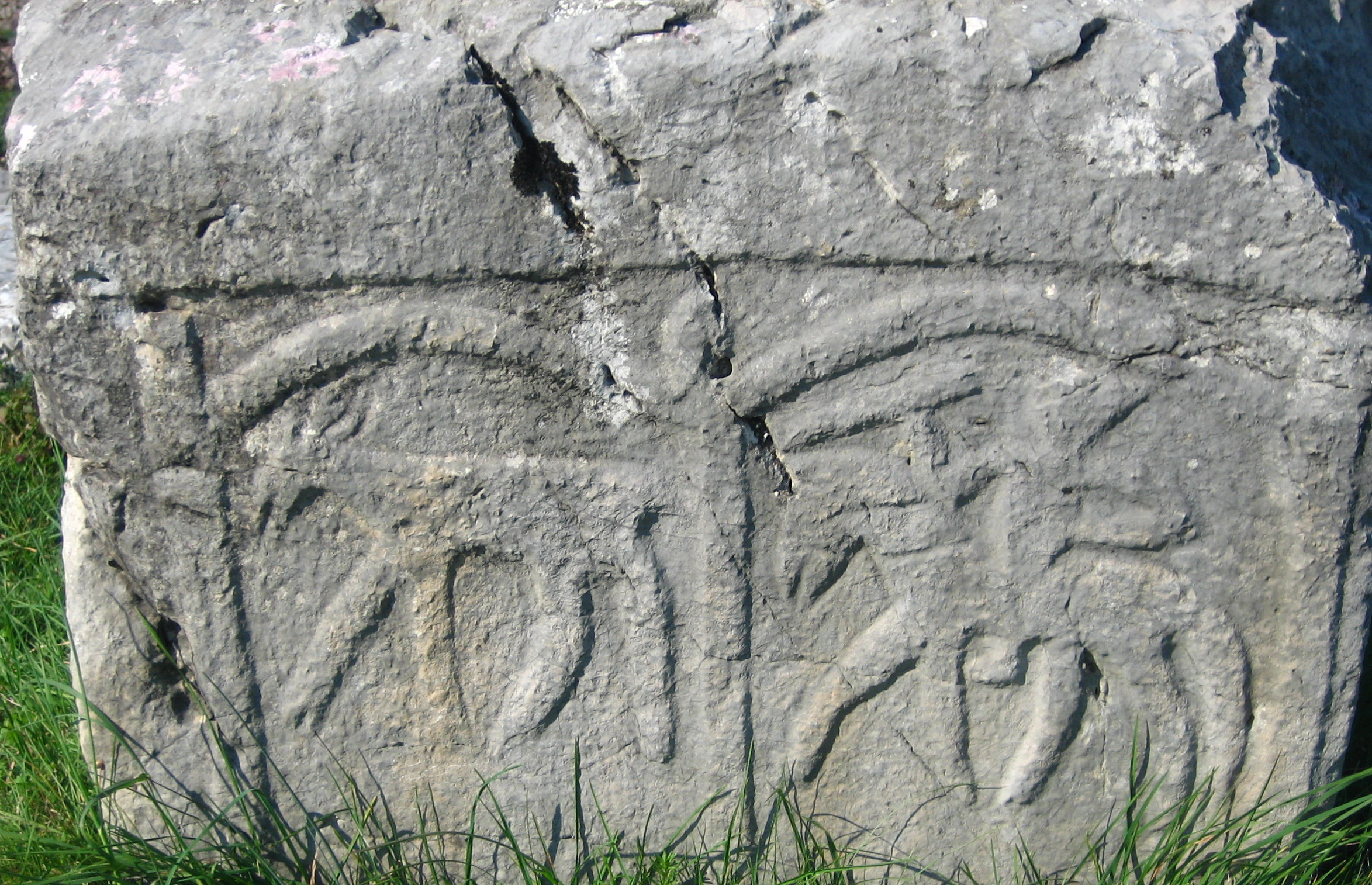
Somewhere in Dalmatia, Croatia

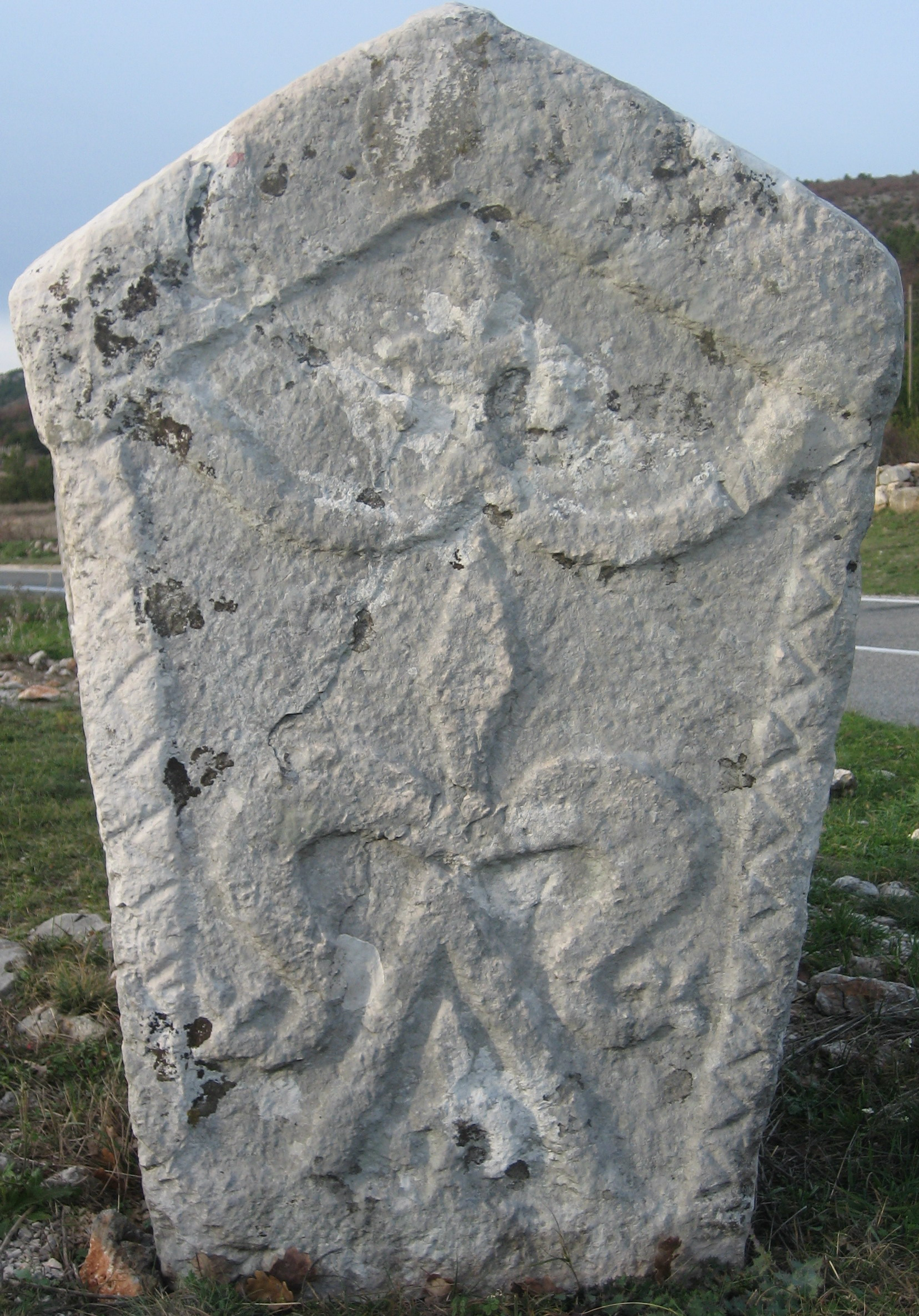
Somewhere in Dalmatia, Croatia

== See also ==
- Bogomilism
- Bosnian Church
- Vlachs in medieval Bosnia and Herzegovina
- Nada Miletić
- Khachkar
