= Emir O. Filipović =

Bosnian historian and medievalist (born 1984)

Prof. Emir O. Filipović
- Born: 30 April 1984 (age 42); Ključ, Bosnia and Herzegovina
- Education: University of Sarajevo
- Occupation: Assistant professor of medieval history
- Years active: 2000-present
- Employer: Department of History at the Faculty of Philosophy in Sarajevo
- Notable work: The Bosnian Kingdom: History of the Medieval Bosnian State

Emir O. Filipović (born 30 April 1984) is a Bosnian historian and medievalist. He works as the assistant professor at the University of Sarajevo, where he teaches medieval history.

== Biography ==
Emir Filipović was born on April 30, 1984, in Ključ. He completed his primary and secondary education in his hometown. He graduated in 2006 from the Department of History at the Faculty of Philosophy in Sarajevo. He defended his master's thesis "Chivalry in Medieval Bosnia" in 2009, and his thesis (doctoral dissertation) "Bosnian Kingdom and the Ottoman Empire (1386–1463)" in 2014.

He has been working at the Department of History, Faculty of Philosophy, University of Sarajevo since 2007. He holds the title of assistant professor and teaches the subjects Early Middle Ages, Late Middle Ages, Bosnia in the Early Middle Ages, Bosnia in the Late Middle Ages, and Auxiliary Historical Disciplines. He has taught and resided at universities in Belgium, Finland, France, Germany, Portugal, and Austria.

His narrow scientific interests include the study of early Bosnian-Ottoman relations, medieval chivalry and court culture, heraldry, and the political, cultural, and religious history of Europe and Bosnia in the 14th and 15th centuries. He has participated in several domestic, regional, and international scientific conferences. He has published a number of peer-reviewed papers and reviews. He is best known work is the seminal book "The Bosnian Kingdom: History of the Medieval Bosnian State", published in Sarajevo in 2017 and 2018.

== Trivia ==
During the research for his doctoral thesis, Filipović's visited the State Archives in Dubrovnik where he came across a book from the 15th century which contained a cat paw prints on some of its pages. Filipović took the photographs and sent them to historian Erik Kwakkel, after which they spread across the Internet. The story was also published by the media, such as Daily Mail, National Geographic, Smithsonian and others.

== Bibliography ==
- About the author, Bosansko kraljevstvo. Historija srednjovjekovne bosanske države, Sarajevo, 2017, 702.
