= Šefik Bešlagić =

Bosnian and Yugoslav historian (1908–1990)

- Portrait of Šefik Bešlagić working on stećak
- Born: 6 April 1908; Tuzla, Condominium of Bosnia and Herzegovina, Austria-Hungary
- Died: 19 November 1990 (aged 82); Sarajevo, SR Bosnia and Herzegovina, SFR Yugoslavia
- Occupation: medievalist
- Known for: studying and description of Stećci

Šefik Bešlagić (6 April 1908 – 19 November 1990) was a cultural historian from Bosnia and Herzegovina, former Yugoslav republic.

== Biography ==
Šefik Bešlagić was born in the town of Gornja Tuzla in 1908. He was born in Bosniak family, and his mother Devleta (née Mulalić) was a housewife, while his father Agan was a teacher.

Šefik Bešlagić was educated in Tuzla, Doboj and Sarajevo, before teaching in Derventa and Gračanica.

From 1953 to 1967 Šefik Bešlagić was the director of the republic's Institute for the Protection of Cultural Monuments of Bosnia and Herzegovina. He explored the medieval necropolis of monumental tombstones or Stećci. He was a historian of material culture, especially of megaliths, stećaks, nišans, čatrnjas, stolicas (judge stone seat or stone chair), and other monuments.

== Historiography ==
Nada Miletić and Alojz Benac dated first significant appearance of the phenomenon of the stećak to the thirteenth century, but this dating has been debated, in particular by Bešlagić and Dubravko Lovrenović, who date the tombstones to the mid-twelfth century.
