= Alojz Benac =

- Born: 20 October 1914; Derventa, Bosnia and Herzegovina, Austria-Hungary
- Died: 6 March 1992 (aged 77); Sarajevo, Bosnia and Herzegovina
- Education: University of Belgrade Ljubljana University
- Known for: Research on Prehistory of the Balkans Director of Centre for Balkan Studies, Academy of Sciences and Arts of Bosnia and Herzegovina
- Scientific career
- Fields: Archaeology
- Workplaces: University of Sarajevo Academy of Sciences and Arts of Bosnia and Herzegovina

Alojz Benac (20 October 1914 – 6 March 1992) was a Bosnian and Yugoslav archaeologist and historian.

He studied classical philology and archaeology in Belgrade's Philosophy Faculty (1937), and received his doctorate from Ljubljana University (1951). He worked in the National Museum of Bosnia and Herzegovina from 1947 to 1967 (in the role of Director from 1957 to 1967). He then left to assume a professorship in archaeology and ancient history in the Faculty of Philosophy of the University of Sarajevo (1968–78). He later became the founder and first Director of the Centre for Balkan Studies, within the Academy of Sciences and Arts of Bosnia and Herzegovina (ANUBiH), of which he was General Secretary from 1971 to 1977 and President from 1977 to 1981.

Benac focused his research on prehistory within the Western Balkans, and undertook numerous systematic archaeological excavations on sites including Arnautovići (Visoko), Crvena Stijena (Montenegro), Hrustovača in Hrustovo (Sanski Most), Obre I and II (Kakanj), Zecovi (Prijedor), Zelena Pećina in Blagaj (Mostar) and others.

He became Chief Editor of the five-volume series "Praistorija jugoslavenskih zemlja" (Prehistory of the Yugoslavian countries) (1979–86), as well as several books and articles, including the following:

• Obre II – neolitsko naselje butmirske grupe na Gornjem polju (Obre II – A Neolithic Settlement of the Butmir Group on the Gornje plain) (1971)

• Prehistorijsko naselje Nebo i problem butmirske kulture (The prehistoric settlement of Nebo and the problem of the Butmir Culture) (1952)

• Glasinac Vols I & II (1957; 1959)

• Studien zur Stein und Kupferzeit im nordwestlichen Balkan (Studies on stone and copper age in north-western Balkans) (1962)

In 1967, Benac was inducted as a regular member of ANUBiH. During his lifetime, he also became a corresponding member of the Yugoslav/Croatian Academy of Sciences and Arts, Serbian Academy of Sciences and Arts, Slovenian Academy of Sciences and Arts, and a member of numerous other international scientific institutions.

== Historiography ==
Nada Miletić and Benac dated the phenomenon of the stećak to the thirteenth century, but this dating has been debated, in particular by Šefik Bešlagić and Dubravko Lovrenović, who date the tombstones to the mid-twelfth century.
