= Vlachs in medieval Bosnia and Herzegovina =

Ethnic group

Vlachs in medieval Bosnia and Herzegovina were a Western Balkans based population descending from a mixture of Romanized pre-Slavic Romance-speaking peoples and the South Slavs. From the 14th century the ethnic meaning of the term "Vlach" was replaced with a more societal understanding, often referring to a specific lifestyle and social structure common to some local Slavic communities. These groups practiced transhumance as herdsmen, shepherds, farmers, and in time developed peculiar socio-political organizational units known as katuns. With their caravans, Vlach carried out much of the traffic between Bosnian inland and coastal cities such as Dubrovnik. They also had close contacts and militarily served various Bosnian noble families and kings.

== History ==
In older scholarship, Marko Vego argued Vlach autochthony because some Vlach settlements named after Vlach tribes, like of Vojnići and Hardomilje, are found near Roman forts and monuments, while Bogumil Hrabak supported Vego's assertion that the Vlachs preceded both Ottoman Turks and Bosnian Slavs in Zachlumia, but by now it is certain that they emerged only as a medieval symbiosis of both autochthonous and Slavic peoples. Hrabak and Dominik Mandić argued that some Vlachs from Herzegovina migrated there from Thessaly, Epirus and Macedonia before the Ottoman invasion into Southern Europe, but although probably happened some waves of small migrations from there and Albania to Montenegro, Serbia and Bosnia and Herzegovina, for such theorization there is a lack of evidence and loose onomastic correlations cannot be used as generalized evidence of a certain linguistic and geographic origin of an individual.

Vlachs are first mentioned in Bosnian documents in c. 1234 by ban Matej Ninoslav. Sources from 1361, 1385, 1399, 1406, 1407, 1408 and 1417 among others mention them in relation to Bosnian bans and kings. Vlachs in the Bosnian state of Tvrtko I were considered as military element. The relationship of Vlach katuns and feudal holdings can be traced from the 14th century. By 1382 they were under the jurisdiction of the Bosnian ruler, and later assigned to large landowners. The Vlachs and lords' relationships indicate that medieval Bosnia was not compact – some Vlach vassals of the ruler, like Gleđević clan for instance, were on considerable distance away from the royal lands. Some Vlach vassals, like Nenko Krajsalić or Radoslav Borojević, became vassals fairly late although Kosača ruled certain lands near eastern banks of Neretva river for fifteen years. Some Vlach vassals, like Maleš clan, were vassals in part to Pavlović and in part to Kosača family, although working on Kosača holdings.

In 1382, Vukoslav Piščić was named as knez of all Vlachs by King Tvrtko I of Bosnia. As the earliest noble landowners in Hum (later Herzegovina), with katun Tomić, they were assigned to the Sanković noble family. In 1409, when Tvrtko I conquered parts of Rascia and Zeta, Vlachs were inhabiting some 100 katuns. They were mentioned as "Vlachorum congregationes et cetus". In the area around Stolac and Žabljak there were so many Vlachs that at the end of the 15th century the territory was called Donji Vlasi (Lower Vlachs). The Gornji Vlasi (Upper Vlachs) were only mentioned by Mavro Orbini.

The 1376 and 1454 documents by Republic of Ragusa about trade with Bosnian lands mention Vlachi et Bosgnani. In the 1418 document by Grgur Nikolić, Vlachs, Serbs and Ragusians are clearly distinguished. In the 14th century documents, they were treated as shepherds from mountains that separate Croatia and Bosnia. It is argued that some group of Vlachs in the 14th century migrated to Zagora and Cetina county in Croatia, followed by the sudden appearance of stećaks in the territory they lived. In 1436, Vlachs are mentioned living around the Cetina, with Croats and Serbs which were part of Count Ivan Frankopan's estate. At a time of social unrest, the Vlachs often fled to the area of Ragusa or Kotor, served in the military of Ragusa during the Ottoman threat, and when most of Herzegovina was occupied by the Ottomans by 1472, once again fled to Ragusan territory. Some data of historic documents show that a part of Vlachs belonged to Bosnian Church, and they largely contributed to the spread of this church. According to Sima Ćirković, ethnicities which appear in the medieval texts from Bosnia include names such as "Bošnjanin", "Vlach", "Latinin" and "Serb".

=== Ottoman rule ===
Ottomans in Bosnia and Herzegovina, following the example of katuns, organized filurîci eflakan (Vlach filurîci) according to "Vlach model" in Smederevo, Vidin and Braničevo. From them was collected taxes baduhava eflakan, or rusum eflak, mostly in the form of sheep or goats, as well gold currency. In the defters of the 1470s and 1480s in Central and North-Central Bosnia, around Visoko and Maglaj, roughly 800 Vlachs arrived accompanied by two Orthodox priests. With war and plagues, and as Catholics fled, the repopulation of Bosnia from Herzegovina and Serbia was of high interest for the Ottomans for their military activities. Benedikt Kuripečič in the 16th century noted that Bosnia is inhabited by three peoples; (Muslim) Turks, (Catholic) Bosnians and (Orthodox) Serbs "who call themselves Vlachs... They came from Smederevo and Belgrade". According to Noel Malcolm in these migrations also participated Serbs and Herzegovinians who were not Vlachs. Since Vlachs weren't paid for military activity by the Ottomans they were permitted to plunder enemy territory, and became known as martolos or voynuk. Their military activity earned them special tax privileges. In the late 15th century at least 35,000 Vlachs lived in Herzegovina, while in the 16th century 82,692 Vlach households lived in the Smederevo region in Serbia.

Within the territories ruled by the Ottoman Empire, Vlach groups moved from southeastern Bosnia (Pavlović area) to central regions of Tešanj and Žepče, also they spread northwest and north of the Sava towards the future Bosanska Krajina. Living on the border of Habsburg Empire they relocated if the social situation was better on the other part of the border. There they received also a special social-military system. Before 1516, Vlachs settled nahia Vrbanja, Prusac, Glamoč and Kupres. In 1527 Ferdinand I freed them from feudal obligations, shared booty with them, gave them their own captains (vojvodas) and magistrates (knezes), and freed them to practice Orthodox Christianity. It eventually led to the organisation of the Military Frontier, and the decree Statuta Valachorum by Ferdinand II. It resulted in a situation almost looking like Vlachs fighting against Vlachs.

=== Herzegovinian Vlachs ===
In southeastern Hum (later southeastern Herzegovina) between 1393 and 1437 many Vlach katuns emerged. The primary lords of the Herzegovinian Vlachs were Bosnian Slavic noble families, the Kosača, Pavlović, Sanković and Nikolić. The Vlachs from Herzegovina sometime plundered lands of Republic of Ragusa in the 14th and 15th century and grew rich by trade of goods between Ragusa and the mines of Bosnia.

Vlachs were surnamed Pliščić, Gleđević, Ugarac, Boban, Mirilović, Vragović, Kresojević, Nenković, Bančić, Pilatovac, Pocrnja, Drobnjak and Riđan. Some of the Banjani and Maleševac (Stanković) were Kosača's vassals.

Vlachs surnamed Vlahović, Žurović, and Predojević, those belonging to the Pribač Nikolić pasture encampment, and some of the Banjan and Maleševac Vlachs (surnamed Hrebeljanović, Milićiević and Milošević) were Pavlovlić's vassals.

The Kutlović clan were vassals of the Nikolic's. The Primilović clan belonged to a larger group of Vlachs, for whom no data on lords were found.

Other katun Vlachs were Boljun, Bukvić, Burmaz, Godun, Hardomilić, Horojević, Hrabren, Jurjević, Kersojević, Kićurić, Kujavić, Milobradačić, Perventinić, Pribinović, Rudinjan, Veseličić, Vitković, Vojnović, Vragović, Zotović.

Vlachs often don't bear "tribe-katun" name as a surname, instead using patronymics, for example katunar Dragić Dobrilović from Boban katun or katunars Klapac Stanković and Radosav Milićević from Maleševac katun.

The Ottoman occupation conquered Vlach territories which caused migrations; Ragusan documents in 1386 recorded that some Vlach with their animals found shelter in Ston and Pelješac (...quod recipiantur in Stagno familie, pastores, animalia et carnesia Vlacorum et circum vicinorum propter eorum saluamentum terrore Teucrurum partes discurrentium), in 1466 Korita, Banjani and Riđani east of Trebinje fell. In 1448 Ragusa again accepted in Ston and Pelješac "peasants and Vlachs of duke Stjepan, Radoje Nikolić and Vukašin Grgurević with families and herds, with leaders and shepherds", as well in 1463 (Vlachs and people from Popovo). During the 15th century they continuously found shelter in the territory of Ragusan Republic, as well Venetian Dalmatia and Bay of Kotor. In 1475–1477 in the nahija Počitelj eleven deserted villages (Gojanovići, Ričica, Kukrica, Opličiči, Plešivac, Svitava, Šanica, Kozica, Gornja Ljubinica, Skočim, Dretelj) were recorded, which were held by the Vlachs. At the time many Vlachs (generally, and from Banjani, Maleševci, Bobani, Zubci in particular) collaborated with Ottomans as slave agents.

== Culture ==
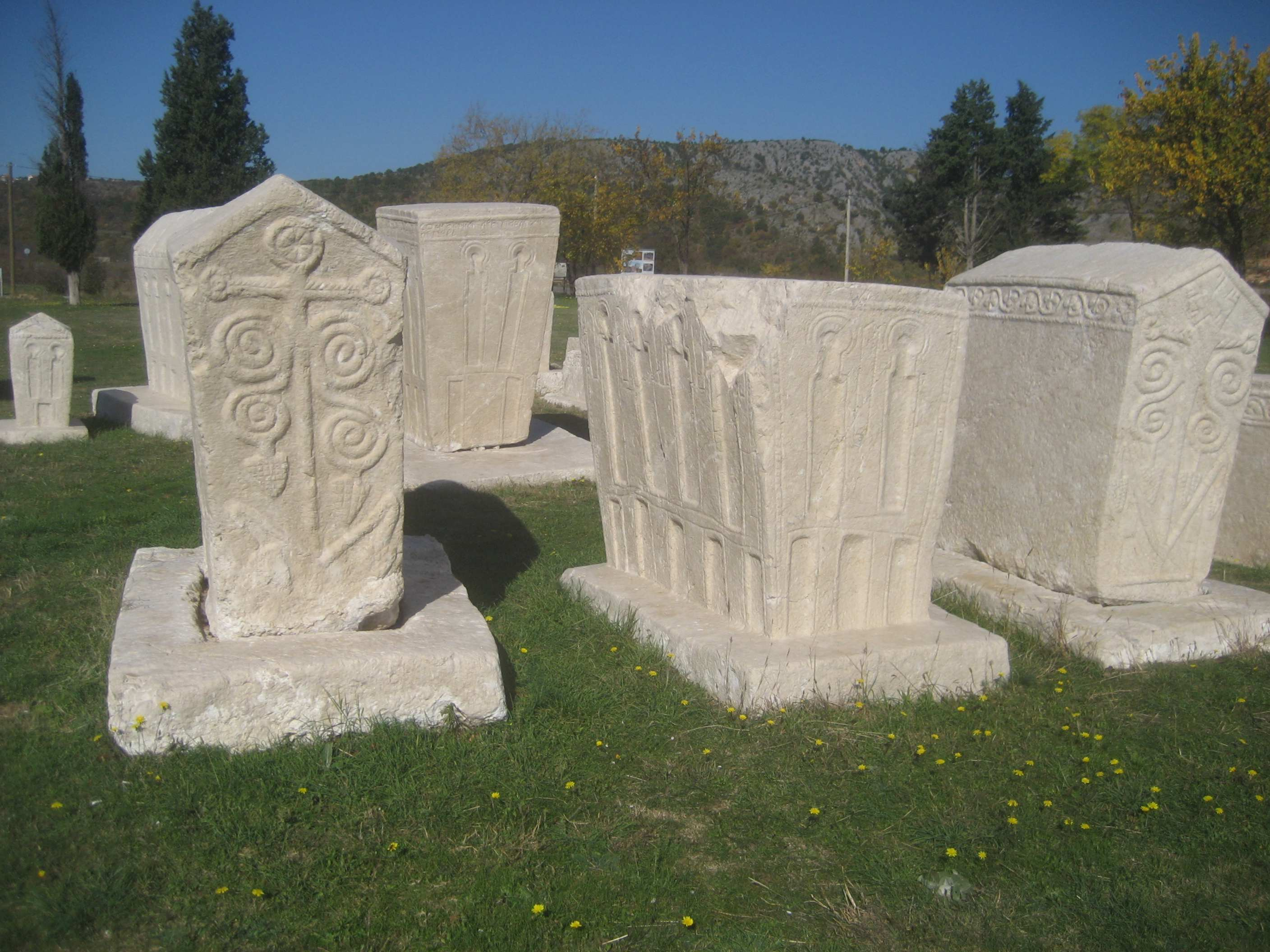
Vlach funerary monuments in Radimlja

They lived in small villages called katun whose chieftain were titled katunar. Around them they placed guards; guard stations were called varde or vardišta. They practiced transhumance as herdsmen and shepherds, and became agricultural when settled permanently. They exported livestock products; animal skin, wool, cheese, butter and dried meat. Other exports included honey and wood. The Vlach cheese was reputable because of fat, and in 1325 sold one libra for 10 folars compared to other cheese that sold for 8 folars. In 1420 Vlach cheese was sold for 15 folars. With their caravans, led by kramar, mostly composed of horses numbering between 10 and 100, they conducted a large part of the trade between inland and coastal cities. Their military tradition and mobile lifestyle was used by the Bosnian lords and later by the Ottomans. These traits changed very little over the centuries.

The emergence of the stećaks and their symbolism in Bosnia and Herzegovina by the scholars is often related to Vlach communities. Most significant stećak necropolis, Radimlja, was Vlachs' Miloradović's family necropolis, which is declared National Monument of Bosnia and Herzegovina by KONS, and inscribed into the List of UNESCO World Heritage as part of stećak nomination.

== Language ==
In the scholarship there is a common consideration that the Vlachs probably were bilingual (Romance and Slavic speaking) based on personal names such Ursul or Šarban and 16th century Venetian records of Vlachs speaking a "corrupted form" of Latin in the historical sources. Other sources argue that their bilingualism probably ended by the 14th century, that there is no historical evidence they spoke a Romance language, and that there should not be confusion of linguistic heritage with ethnic identity. Ćiro Truhelka argued that the evasion of the writing and spelling letter /H/ in Serbian language until Karadžić's reform is due to Vlachs influence as it is a Romance language characteristic. Initially the Vlachs, alike near Slavic-speaking people, used an Ikavian accent, and later I/jekavian accent spreading it further, of Neo-Shtokavian dialect of Serbo-Croatian. Those who migrated to the West during Ottoman invasion spoke what are now labeled Eastern Herzegovinian and Bosnian–Dalmatian subdialects. LZMK linguist Nataša Bašić argued that the Vlachs were creators of New-Shtokavian dialect with reduced number of cases in declination, with New-Shtokavian accent, with the loss of the phoneme /H/, with diphthongization old jat and other modifications characteristic for foreigners, especially for Romans.

== Religion ==
Pope Gregory XI in 1372 letter for Franciscans in Bosnia ordered them to convert Vlachs who live in tents and pastures (Wlachorum... quorum nonnulli in pascuis et tentoriis habitant). Their religion depended upon social and political events. During Ottoman occupation the Orthodox Church was more politically favored than Roman Catholic.

The first Orthodox churches in Bosnia and Herzegovina were built in the 13th century on its eastern reaches. Before the arrival of the Ottomans, on the Bosnian proper the Orthodox Church had some presence as the Serbian Orthodox Church, limited exclusively to areas adjoined to the Kingdom of Bosnia by Tvrtko I's conquests in the lands to the east across the Drina River, traditionally under Serbian suzerainty. In the area of eastern Hum, today Eastern Herzegovina, there was Eparchy of Zachlumia and the Littoral and it held a much prominent role prior to 1250's when it relocated from Ston to the valley of river Lim. In the 16th century, although Ottoman law prohibited building of new churches, several Orthodox monasteries were built, notably in Tavna, Lomnica, Paprača, Ozren and Gostović, while Rmanj Monastery in northwestern Bosnia was first mentioned in 1515. According to Noel Malcolm, although Orthodox believers were underprivileged and often ill-treated under Ottoman regime the Orthodox Church was, however, much favored, especially compared to the Roman Catholic church. A significant proportion of the Orthodox churches and monasteries in present-day Herzegovina were only built under Ottoman rule. Several larger monasteries were built for the needs of the church hierarchy such as Žitomislić by the Neretva, Tvrdoš near Trebinje, Nikoljac (in Bijelo Polje), the Holy Trinity in Pljevlja and Piva.

The example of Herzegovina reveals that the immigrant Vlach herdsmen had more economic power and they were more religious than their predecessors who lived there under Christian lords. With time the Slavicized Vlachs who were of Orthodox faith were eventually Serbianized, and those of Roman Catholic faith were Croatized, while others who embraced Islam became Muslims and later (modern days) Bosniaks.

== Legacy ==
Ilona Czamańska claims that "The majority of Serbs from the Republika Srpska of modern Bosnia is of Vlach origin, as well as the majority of the population from Bosnia and Herzegovina in general"–this also applies to the entire Western Balkans as a mixture of Slavic and indigenous population–but also states that "there are none direct sources to support Vlach colonization of these lands." Serbian Orthodox Church have a decisive role in the process of national identification of Vlachs in Croatia and Bosnia and Herzegovina who became Serbs while Catholic Vlachs became Croats.

Today only a small part of former Vlachs declares with this name. According to Noel Malcolm, today it makes no sense to claim that Bosnian Serbs are "actually" Vlachs because members of the Serbian Orthodox Church over time crossed the Drina and moved to Bosnia or moved north from Herzegovina, but not all people who settled northern Bosnia in the 15th and 16th century were Vlachs. There were too many arrivals and departures to determine what is the percentage of Vlach ancestors of Bosnian Serbs since the Vlachs did not only contribute to the growth of the Serbian population, Vlachs mostly in Croatia converted to the Catholic faith later becoming Croats, and many of them in Bosnia converted to Islam later becoming Bosniaks.

== Notable Bosnian Vlachs ==
- Hasan Pasha Predojević (c. 1530 – 22 June 1593) – the Predojević Vlachs are first mentioned 1372, while since 1468 were included in the Ottoman hierarchy.
- Hrabren-Miloradovićs are probably most researched Bosnian Vlachs' clan. The family with its numerous later branches were included in the Ottoman hierarchy and became sipahi and timariot. As was customary and a usual practice under the Ottomans, they were allowed to retain their religion, titles and privileges, and gaining new one. In case of Miloradovićs clan, Bosnian Church and predominantly Orthodox Christianity was their affiliation, while some branches converted to Islam. Both groups are still present in Herzegovina around the Lower Neretva.

== See also ==
- Vlachs
- Morlachs
- Vlach law
- Vlachs of Croatia
- Tribes of Montenegro
- Vlachs in medieval Serbia
- Vlach (Ottoman social class)

== Sources ==
- Vego, Marko (1957). Naselja bosanske srednjovjekovne države (in Serbo-Croatian). Sarajevo: Svjetlost. pp. 127–129.
- Fine, John (1987). The Late Medieval Balkans: A Critical Survey from the Late Twelfth Century. University of Michigan Press. ISBN 9780472081493.
- Malcolm, Noel (1994). Bosnia, A Short History. New York University Press.
- Malcolm, Noel (1995). Povijest Bosne : kratki pregled. Erasmus Gilda : Novi Liber. ISBN 953-6045-03-6.
- Ćirković, Sima (2004). The Serbs. Malden: Blackwell Publishing. ISBN 9781405142915.
- Mirdita, Zef (2004). Vlasi u historiografiji (in Croatian). Hrvatski institut za povijest. ISBN 953-6324-43-1.
- Šarić, Marko (2009), "Predmoderne etnije u Lici i Krbavi prema popisu iz 1712./14.", in Željko Holjevac (ed.), Identitet Like: Korijeni i razvitak (PDF) (in Croatian), vol. 1, Zagreb: Institut društvenih znanosti Ivo Pilar, ISBN 978-953-6666-65-2, archived from the original (PDF) on 2015-09-24
- Mužić, Ivan (2009). "Vlasi i starobalkanska pretkršćanska simbolika jelena na stećcima". Starohrvatska Prosvjeta (in Croatian). III (36). Split: Museum of Croatian Archaeological Monuments: 315–349.
- Mužić, Ivan (2010). Vlasi u starijoj hrvatskoj historiografiji (PDF) (in Croatian). Split: Muzej hrvatskih arheoloških spomenika. ISBN 978-953-6803-25-5. Archived from the original (PDF) on 2015-09-22.
- Krešić, Milenko (2010). "Depopulacija jugoistočne Hercegovine izazvana turskim osvajanjem" [The depopulation of south-eastern Herzegovina caused by the Turkish conquest]. Povijesni prilozi (Historical Contributions) (in Croatian). 39 (39). Zagreb: Croatian Institute of History: 107–123.
- Kurtović, Esad (2011a). "Seniori hercegovačkih vlaha" [Seniors of Herzegovinian Vlachs]. Hum i Hercegovina kroz povijest. Zbornik radova s međunarodnoga znanstvenog skupa održanog u Mostaru 5. i 6. studenoga 2009 [Hum and Herzegovina through History. Proceedings of the International Scientific Conference Held in Mostar on November 5 and 6, 2009] (in Croatian). Zagreb: Hrvatski institut za povijest [Croatian Institute of History]. pp. 646–695.
- Kurtović, Esad (2011b). "Iz historije vlaha Predojevića" [About the history of Predojević Vlachs]. Godišnjak (in Bosnian) (40). Academy of Sciences and Arts of Bosnia and Herzegovina: 242–254. ISSN 2232-7770.
- Pijović, Marko (2018). Vlasi u dubrovačkim spomenicima do 14. stoljeća [Vlachs in the Ragusan sources until the 14th century] (PhD). Zagreb: Faculty of Humanities and Social Sciences, University of Zagreb.
- Ciobanu, Octavian (2018). "The emergence of Vlach necropolises with petroglyphs in Western Balkans". The Journal of Ethnology and Culturology. XXIV. Chişinău: 5–10.
- Ciobanu, Octavian (2021a). "The Role of the Vlachs in the Bogomils' Expansion in the Balkans". Journal of Balkan and Black Sea Studies. Year 4, Issue 7. Istanbul: 11–32.
