= Katun (community) =

Rural self-governing community in the Balkans

The katun (Albanian: katun(d); Aromanian: cãtun; Romanian: cătun; Serbian: катун) is a rural self-governing community in the Balkans, traditional of the living style of Albanians, Vlachs (in Bosnia and Herzegovina, Croatia, Montenegro and Serbia), as well as some Slavic communities of hill people. Traditionally, a katun is based on strong kinship ties and the practice of a closed farming economy based on stockbreeding, constantly moving to find pasture. The community based its organizational, political and economic activities on the decisions of a council of elders or a senior member appointed as its leader. The Albanian communities strictly followed the Kanun, their traditional customary law that has directed all the aspects of their kinship-based society.

This form of association of people resulted from the absence of strong central government. Particularly autonomous katuns are observed in documents from the second half of the 14th and 15th centuries. Usually it is described as "mountainous landscape with pastures where people lived temporarily with cattle and where they lived only during the summer in huts". However, this description is more in line with today's distinct form of nomadic pastoralism called transhumance, whereas in the medieval times it had socio-political dimension, and significance in social and state affairs.

== Terminology ==
The katun has changed its physiognomy over time, so it is difficult to pinpoint one definition that would explain exact meaning throughout the history. Over time, katun became a synonym for a particular settlement. Medieval katun is neither a temporary nor permanent summer stână in Romanian, or băcia (transl. habitat), in a modern sense of these words. In the area of the medieval Bosnian state, the socio-political life of the Vlach population was organized in a specific way, which bear certain similarities with the organization among Vlachs across the neighboring Balkans areas and states. Various authors have suggested that katun is a word of Illyrian, Thracian, Uralo-Altaic, Proto-Bulgarian or some other origin.

== Development and earliest records ==
A katun consisted of a community of several families or households gathered around one leader who directed the organizational, political and economic goals of his group. The main occupation in the katun was always cattle breeding, almost exclusively sheep and to some extent goats, so the community used to be quite mobile. Earlier, nomadic pastoralism was characterized with the construction of temporary camps under tents. Erection of tents in the 14th and 15th centuries could be interpreted as the gradual expansion of the katun into new territories, or the first step towards building more permanent settlements, most often villages. The shape and scope of the katuns varied, and their warrior companies were important. These companies used to serve under local Slavic noblemen, who often bore the title of voivode. They sometimes served under foreign militaries, such as the Venetians and the Ottomans. In the end, some katuns managed to expand into larger territories, where there was a lack of influence from the regional or central government and social relations. In the second half of the 14th and 15th centuries, some of these katuns built permanent villages, outside or in the župas themselves. They inhabited Church estates and city districts and townships, which were already subordinated to a city municipality or to local lords. By settling themselves, those katuns brought some elements of self-governance and gathered more scattered villages around them. Other, usually smaller, katuns joined them, the resulting groups being called "municipalities". Such groups (municipalities and katuns) could encompass a large number of villages and hamlets, and numerous population of different ethnic and/or cultural background.

=== Earliest katuns in records ===
The earliest news about Vlach katuns can be found in the sources of Byzantine provenance, in the letters of Patriarch Nicholas to Emperor Alexius I Comnenus, at the very beginning of the 12th century. The first mentions of katuns in medieval Bosnia dates back from the 14th century and are related to the Burmazi (1300), Banjani (1319), Drobnjaci (1354), Predojevići (1356), Mirilovići (1366), Zlokruha (1367), Žurovići (1367), Ugarci (1368), Vlahovići (1368), Tomići (1369), Vragovići (1376), Plijeske (1377), Prijeraci (1377), Kresojevići (1379), Perutinići (1386), Hrabreni (1388), Kutlovići (1393) and Maleševci (1397). Stefan Uroš II mentions Albanian katuns in the region of Drenica between 1246-1255. Albanian and Vlach katuns are mentioned as being gifted to the Visoki Dečani monastery in 1330, and in Stefan Dušan's chrystobull of 1348 a total of 9 Albanian katuns are mentioned around the vicinity Prizren.

== Chieftains ==
The elder was chosen from a family that stood out for his wealth and war reputation, and oftentimes, but not always, he would be able to pass the seniority to his descendants. He would govern the community during a movement or war, and would maintain close relation with other elders and representatives of other families. As the katun grew and organizationally developed, warrior petty nobility multiplied, and in feudal organisation would take a title of knez, who would often rule over 40 or 50 individual villages. The head of a katun was called 'prijs'. Family ties among the prominent individuals were important. The commander of the “warrior company” of the katun was usually the katun chieftain, the leader who would bear a specific title called katunar. His son or one of his close relatives (fraternity) would take his place when needed.

== See also ==
- Morlachs

== Bibliography ==
- Kola, Azeta (2017). "From Serenissima's Centralization to the Self-Regulating Kanun: The Strengthening of Blood Ties and the Rise of Great Tribes in Northern Albania From 15th to 17th Century". Acta Histriae. 25 (2): 349–374.
