= Vlachs in the history of Croatia =

The term Vlachs (Croatian: Vlasi) was initially used in medieval Croatian and Venetian history for a Romance-speaking pastoralist community, called "Vlachs" and "Morlachs", inhabiting the mountains and lands of the Croatian Kingdom and the Republic of Venice (Venetian Dalmatia) from the early 14th century. By the end of the 15th century they were highly assimilated with the Slavs and lost their language or were at least bilingual, while some communities managed to preserve and continue to speak their language (Istro-Romanians).

Later in the 16th and 17th century with the Ottoman conquest and mass migrations, the term was primarily used for a socio-cultural and professional segment of the population rather than to an ethnicity, and referred to the mostly Slavic-speaking emigrants and refugees from Ottoman-held territories to the Habsburg Empire (such as Croatia) and the Republic of Venice (Dalmatia), mostly of Eastern Orthodox faith, and to a lesser degree, Catholic. With the nation-building in the 19th century this population played a significant part in the national ideologies in Croatia and Serbia, and according to religious confession espoused either Croat or Serb ethnicity.

In Croatia today, the Vlachs are a recognized national minority (along with 22 other ethnic groups), with 22 individuals declared as Vlachs in the 2021 Croatian census, making them the smallest recognized minority in Croatia. Other ethnic groups that were also traditionally referred to as Vlachs in Croatia now identify by their respective ethnic names – namely Serbs, Romanians, Aromanians and Istro-Romanians (which are native to modern Croatia's Istria County).

== Appellation ==
The meaning of the term Vlach within the territory of present-day Croatia (like Bosnia and Herzegovina and Serbia) differed over time and had multiple meanings. In the Middle Ages it was primarily an exonym that referred to Romance-speaking pastoralist communities in the mountains, or rarely other Romance-speaking people like Italians. Due to their specific lifestyle, the term acquired a social-professional (shepherd) connotation. In the 13th and 14th centuries the shepherds of the Balkans were called Vlachs (Vlasi), including Slavic-speakers. Initially it was used for shepherds and transporters in the hinterland regardless of ethnicity and religion (though often Romance-speaking), strangers and newcomers as opposed to natives (in Istria, for speakers with Shtokavian traits), for hinterlanders by Dalmatian island inhabitants, for rugged villagers by the townspeople, and later for Orthodox Christians (with time mostly identified with Serbs). From the 16th century, with the Ottoman conquest and mass migrations of Slavic-speaking people, the term Vlach was primarily used for a socio-cultural and professional segment of the population, rather than for an ethnicity.

Regardless of their religious affiliation that is the entire population of Generalate which came from the Ottoman and Venetian territories was called Vlachs; they were distinguished by their semi-nomadic pastoral way of life as economically transhumant shepherds, mainly of sheep, goats and horses. Also, their characteristics were cultural traits: wearing dark clothes, use of the gusle musical instrument (that accompanied epic singing), and Ojkanje singing. Such a lifestyle allowed specific socio-cultural traits, like learning about the area, orientation during multi-day movement, organization and wartime skills, which was recognized and used by the Late Medieval nobility and kings. They lived in extended families (as per the Western Balkan type), and were organised into local communities (knežine), and were bearers of a strongly patriarchal culture associated with the Dinaric Alps.

While the Slavic communities managed to form national identities founding regional provinces and kingdoms, Romance-speaking Vlachs did not manage to form a national identity and were prone to assimilation. However, even if they were prone to national, linguistical and cultural assimilation with the Slavs, they did contribute to their respective communities. The problems the Vlachs faced with the creation of the national identity did not differ very much from what other rural communities face. Rural people comprised the majority of the population in the Middle Ages, and the centuries of war, conquest, regional boundaries, migrations, religious conversions, cultural blending and socio-economic problems affected the belonging of a population to a specific South Slavic national group. The regions of Lika (which mostly involved the Croatian Military Frontier) and Dalmatia were the border area between Habsburg, Ottoman and Venetian empires, a place of mass migrations and mixing of communities.

In the area, the confessional, socio-cultural and geo-regional characteristics had a crucial impact on the creation of an ethnic identity. The equalization between religious confession and ethnicity began in the middle of the 16th century when the Serbian Orthodox Church (Patriarchate of Peć), which had a significant religious and political influence on Serbs, started since 1557 to identify Orthodoxy with Serbdom. Gradually in the 17th century, as Croatian culture was preserved by the Roman Catholic Diocese of Senj-Modruš in Croatia, and the Franciscan Province of Bosna Srebrena in Ottoman Bosnia, Roman Catholicism was identified with the Croatian national name. The socio-cultural difference was a lifestyle distinction between the natives (Catholic, peasant, smaller families) and the newer migrants (Orthodox, pastoralist, larger families) from Ottoman and Venetian territory who were referred to as Vlachs in the social sense, and their "Vlach" identity was mainly in the context of claiming the traditional legal rights and privileges of their social class by the state.

=== Medieval usage ===
The Vlachs mentioned in medieval documents up until the 16th century, before the Ottoman invasion and migrations, were the progeny of Romanized Illyrians and Thraco-Romans, other pre-Slavic Romance-speaking people, and after arrival in the 6th-8th centuries also of Slavic people. Some Romance-speaking groups were autochthonous in Croatia and assimilated with Slavs, some were assimilated but preserved their identity and name, while some other groups migrated from Herzegovina to Dalmatia in very late 14th century.

With the arrival of Slavs, Vlachs began to assimilate with them, and being exposed to the Slavic language, they gradually began to adopt it as their own. Raymond D'Aguilers and William of Tyre, during the passage of the Crusaders in the 11th century, contrasted the people who lived in the hilly hinterlands, spoke Slavic and dealt with cattle grooming with those on the coast who still spoke the Latin language (probably the extinct Dalmatian language) and had different customs. In documents from Lika (1433), Cetina (1436), and Zrmanja (1486–1487), a century after their first mention in Croatian historical documents, the Vlachs had mostly non-Christian, traditional South Slavic names and surnames. On that note, the Vlachs mostly differed from the Croats who usually had Christian names. The Vlachs were called Vlasi na Hrvateh, "good Vlachs" (dobri Vlasi), "good men from katuns" (dobri muži katunari), or "royal Vlachs" (Olahi domini nostri regis, Wolachi banatus regni Croatie).

However, despite this cross-pollination of language, some groups of Vlachs may have remained distinct from the Slavs; historical sources from the 14th and 15th centuries differentiate Slavs and Vlachs in the area of Kotor, Dubrovnik, Bosnia and Croatia (Slavi et Vlachy, Vlachy et Bosgniani, Serbi et Vlachi). In 1345, in Cetina Croati et Olachy are differentiated, while in a 1436 document, Catholic Vlachs of the county of Cetina (around the town of Sinj) were represented as distinct from both the Croats and the Serbs inhabiting the county. In 1450, in the area of Šibenik, Morlachi ac Hervati were differentiated. In a book by Ragusan historian Ludovik Crijević (1459–1527), Writings on the Present Age, Vlachs (Valachos) were distinguished from other people, and were mentioned as "nomadic Illyrians who in the common language are called Vlachs" and there is also the mention of the present-day surname Kožul/lj in "Cossuli, a kind of Illyrian people considered Romans". During the Orthodox migration to Žumberak in 1538, general commander Nikola Jurišić mentioned the Vlachs who "in our parts are called as Old Romans" separate from the Serbs and Rascians.

During the 14th century, Vlach settlements existed throughout much of today's Croatia, but centres of population were focused around the Velebit and Dinara mountains and along the Krka and Cetina rivers. The Vlachs were divided into common Vlachs from Cetina and royal Vlachs from Lika. The Vlach population lived on the territory of noble families: the Nelipić family (Cetina–Knin), Šubić family (Pokrčje), Gusić family (Pozrmanje), and Frankopan family (Lika). Between 1400 and 1600 many Vlach families had settled Istria and island of Krk. The Frankopans settled Vlachs on the island of Krk (Dubašnica, Poljica) in the 15th century, and later around Učka. The Venetian colonization of Istria started not later than the early 1520s, and there were several cases when they returned to Dalmatia.

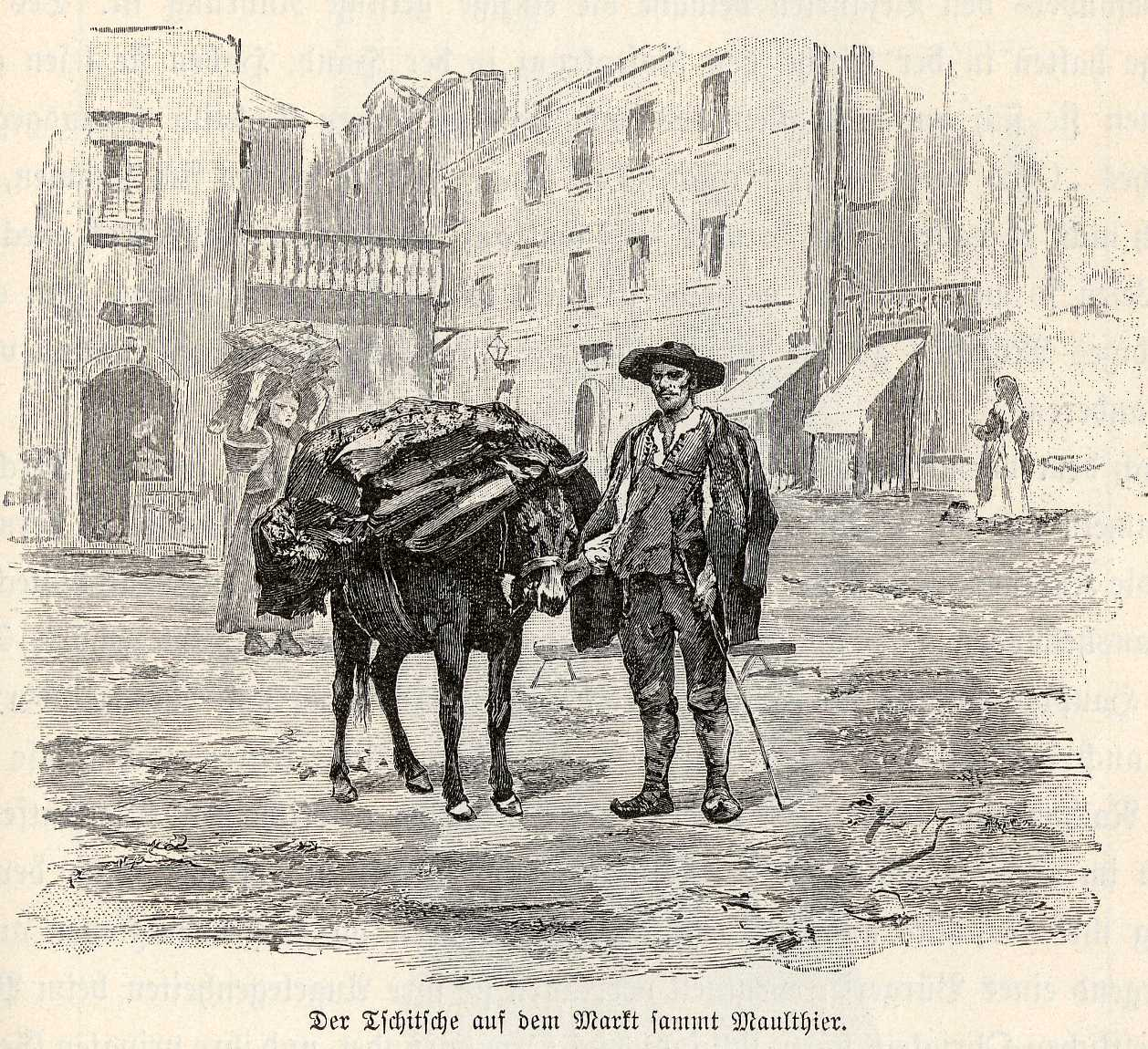
Drawing of an Istro-Romanian from 1891. They and other Vlachs in northern Istria were called Ćići. The mountain Ćićarija consequently got named after its inhabitants.

The Vlach people distinctively lived as shepherds and as traveling merchants on trading routes. They lived in villages, and hamlets called katun (ro. cătun), smaller village-like places in the mountains and lower areas where they dwelled during the transhumant period. The 1436 document (Vlach law) confirmed in Klis by ban Ivan Frankopan, beside clear ethnic diversity in the county of Cetina, showed that there were two social groups of Vlachs: those with villages who pay tax, and those without villages who are nomads and thus obligated to serve in the army as horsemen.

According to Stjepan Pavičić (1931), the Romance Vlachs or Morlachs of the Dinara and Velebit lost their Romance language by the 14th or 15th century, or were at least bilingual at that time. The so-called Istro-Romanians, who called themselves Rumeri or Vlasi, continued to speak their language on the island of Krk (extinct in the 20th century; recorded Pater Noster) and villages around the Čepić lake in Istria, while other communities in the mountains (Ćićarija) above the lake preserved the Shtokavian-Chakavian dialect with Ikavian accent from the southern Velebit and area of Zadar. The documents about Vlachs from Cetina county indicate Chakavian dialect with Ikavian accent.

The evidence of their Romance language are toponyms throughout the Dinaric Alps, and many anthroponyms (surnames) with specific Romance or Slavic word roots, and Romanian ending suffixes found among South Slavic people. The "Vlach" or "Romanian" traditional system of counting sheep in pairs do ('two'; cf. Rmn. doi), pato ('four'; cf. Rmn. patru), šasto ('six'; cf. Rmn. șase), šopći ('eight'; cf. Rmn. opt), zeći ('ten'; cf. Rmn. zece) has been preserved in Velebit, Bukovica, Dalmatian Zagora, and Ćićarija to the present day.

=== Early modern usage ===
Socioculturally, there were two main ethnic divisions in the Croatian Military Frontier, those of the "native" Croats and "immigrant" Vlachs. The Croats were Catholics, Habsburg subjects, made up of an agrarian population concentrated around frontier towns, of nuclear families, and linguistically predominantly Chakavian-speaking (or Chakavian-based speech). The Vlachs, regardless of their religious affiliation, were refugees from Ottoman and Venetian territories, holders of patriarchal-pastoral culture of the Dinaric, of extended families, and linguistically Neo-Shtokavian-speaking. The holders of Balkan Patriarchate were mostly three socio-ethnic groups: Albanian, Vlach and Slavic.

The Vlachs from Lika were predominantly Orthodox Christian by religion, and also, the traditional social grouping of Vlachs was the Orthodox group itself. The Orthodox Vlachs from Lika area spoke the Eastern Herzegovinian ijekavian dialect while the Catholic Vlachs (the Bunjevci), spoke the Western Herzegovinian ikavian dialect. The Vlachs were also called on some occasions Rasciani sive Serviani and Valachicae seu Rascianae gentis, which was an exonym for the Serbs or Orthodox Christians. In the period 1500–1800 in Europe, religious differences were one of the main cultural differences in ethnic groups. The state triangle at Lika in what is today Croatia was an area in which Roman Catholicism, Serbian Orthodoxy, and Islam met. Orthodox Vlachs from the middle of the 16th century gradually became part of the Serbian ethno-confessional identity, but this identity was fully consolidated only after 1695.

Croatian historian Marko Šarić notes that the Lika-Krbava Vlachs can be seen as one of the sub-ethnic groups of the pre-modern Serb ethnic group. The Serb–Rascian attributes point to the attachment of Vlach Orthodox communities to the wider pre-modern Serb ethnocultural corps. However, although some documents from the 16th and 17th centuries in the Habsburg Imperial Court used the terms Vlachs, Rascians and Serbs as synonyms (indicating their Orthodox confession), the socio-cultural and ethnological evidence on the ground does not support such a simplified interpretation of the ethnic identity of Orthodox Vlachs. According to Mirko Markovic, the Vlach population from Slavonia needs to be well-distinguished from ethnic Serbs who come to Srijem, Banat, Bačka and eastern Slavonia in the late 17th and early 18th centuries as fugitives from southern Serbia.

J. W. Valvasor, in his 1689 work which described the Carniolan–Croatian area of the Croatian Military Frontier and the Maritime Frontier, differentiated between Croats and Vlachs (whom he also called Uskoks and Morlachs), and called the latter's Shtokavian language "Vlach" (Walachische) which he said was close to the "Dalmatian" (Dalmatische) and "Slavonian" (Schlavonische) languages. In Venetian usage for Dalmatia, the Slavic language was called Illyrian (Illirico) or Serbian (Serviano). At the time of the Morean War (1684–89) Vlachs fled Ottoman-held Lika and temporarily settled as 1,700 families in Venetian Dalmatia, and 530 families in the Karlovac Generalate (Croatian Military Frontier). Since 1690, they, and some Vlach families from Dalmatia and Bosnia, began to return to their original provinces in Lika and Krbava. With them in 1694 arrived Serbian Orthodox metropolitan Atanasije Ljubojević who established the Lika–Krbava (Ličko-Krbavska) and Zrinopolje (Zrinopoljska) eparchies.

=== Anthroponymy ===
The data on Lika and Krbava in the 1712–1714 censuses was studied by Croatian historian Marko Šarić who also divided pre-modern ethnic groups (etnije) into Orthodox Vlachs (Serbian Orthodox) listed in the census as Schismatics (Schismatische Wallachen, Walachi, Wolochi), Catholic Vlachs (Bunjevci), Carniolans (Kranjci), Croats and Turks (Catholicized former Muslims), based on Zagreb bishop Martin Brajković's earlier groupings. The statistical categories were minimal to socio-religious and military and economic aspects of the population, but including a list of 713 surnames it is an important source for onomastics, and to comprehend the ethnic identity of the population.

The majority of nobility in Lika consisted of Catholic Croats, while the vast majority of population were Vlachs (Serbian Orthodox). By confessional affiliation the Serbian Orthodox (Vlachs) numbered 71% of the total population in Lika and Krbava while Catholics overall 29%. According to the dual model of ethnic structure, 87% of the Lika-Krbava population belonged to the Vlachs of social and cultural history. According to the five nations model of ethnic structure, Orthodox Vlachs numbered 71%, Bunjevci (Catholic Vlachs) 16%, Carniolans 6%, Croats 4% and Turks (Muslims converted to Catholicism) 2%. Future studies have found that at the beginning of the 20th century only 60–64% of the surnames were preserved, with mostly Carniolan surnames having vanished. The "Turk" surnames indicate an Islamic-"Oriental" influence, and most are Muslim-patronymic. The "Carniolan" surnames indicate a Kajkavian cultural and regional sphere, and are characteristically mostly occupational, many linguistically Germanic, some permeate with other dialects, and they have the smallest share of the ending suffix "-ić". The "Croats" show an archaic age, many are mentioned in the Middle Ages and the 15th and 16th centuries before the Council of Trent, while some are from the second half of the 16th and 17th centuries and of Dinaric origin.

The anthroponymic structure in the surnames of Orthodox Vlachs and Catholic Bunjevci was very similar, while the pastoral (Dinaric) culture, Neo-Shtokavian speech, and social and military role in the frontiers created uniform anthroponymic forms. Religious confession was not crucial to the pattern of surnames as patronymic surnames of Catholic or Orthodox character were also found in the opposite confessional group of those mentioned. A very large number of surnames were derived from the Slavic word roots -vuk, -rad, and -mil, and it was also noted that matronymic surnames and nicknames were more present in the Vlach group than in the others. Some 20% were of "Old Balkanic" origin, of Romance root words (and Slavic suffixes -ić, -ac, -an, -en, -elj) or Romance suffixes (-ul, -as, -at, -ta, -er, -et, -man), and also some found derived from Illyrian–Thracian root words or with Albanian suffixes (-aj and -eza).

=== Religion ===
Pope Gregory IX, in his letter of 14 November 1234 to King Béla IV of Hungary, noted that the "Vlachs, although by name are considered Christians... have rituals which are hostile to the Christian name". Pope Gregory XI, in his letter from 1372 to the Franciscans in Bosnia, ordered them to convert the Vlachs who lived in tents and pastures (Wlachorum... quorum nonnulli in pascuis et tentoriis habitant), also relating to the activity of the Bosnian Church (see also stećaks). Scholar Bogumil Hrabak emphasized that there is no need to insist on the religious affiliation of the pastoralist communities in the Balkan, especially the Vlachs. Living in closed transhumance communities, they changed religious affiliation according to the regional religion (Roman Catholic or Orthodox) where they lived for a prolonged time, and if they were not followed by the specific priest. Their ignorance and lack of Christian Church commitment are seen in the case of the Vlachs who were settled in Žumberak (in the 1530s), who begged commander Johann Katzianer to be Christianized. Orthodoxy as such was also more akin to them rather than feudal Roman Catholicism, whose dogma did not allow them to embrace as many pagan beliefs as in the Orthodox Church.

== History ==
=== Middle Ages ===
Reference to the existence of Vlachs or Romance-speaking people in Medieval Croatia dates from the early Middle Age; One of the first mention of Vlachs is the 1071 charter by the Croatian King Krešimir IV about the Rab diocese, when on the island of Pag the village Wlasici (today village Vlašići) was mentioned, but is considered a forgery from the late 12th and early 13th century. The Libellus Policorion, a church cartulary dated to the mid-14th century that includes transcriptions of older collected documents about the estates of the now extinct Benedictine Abbey of St John the Evangelist in Biograd and Saints Cosmas and Damian on the island of Pašman, mentions one Kutun (Katun) district. Vlachs can be traced by personal names and peculiarly by the suffix -ul in Dalmatian city documents since the 10th century. The sudden appearance of the Vlach name in the historical documents is due to the official introduction of specific rights in the notary books for taxation and trade only from 1307.

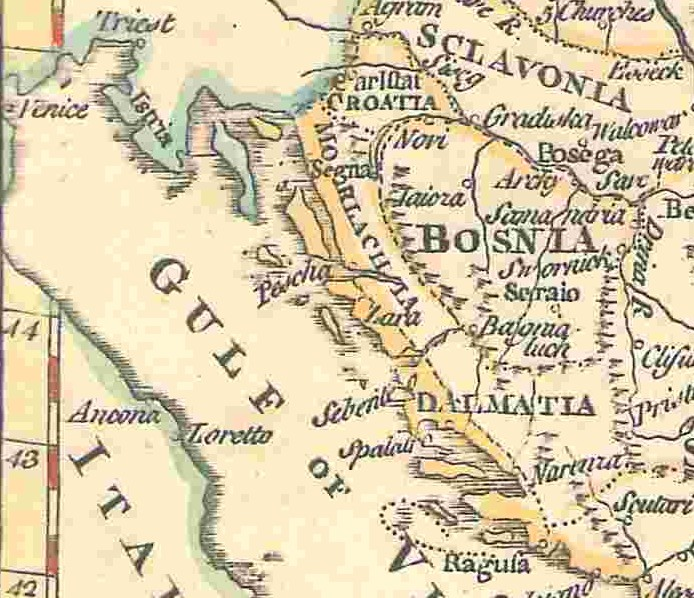
Morlachia in a map of the 17th century

The first collective reference to Vlachs, or Morlachs in some Latin and mostly Venetian and Italian documents, dates from the early 1320s (almost 900 years after Slavic migration); in 1321, a local priest from Dobrinj on the island of Krk granted land to the church ("to the lands of Kneže, which are called Vlach"), while in 1322 they and the people of Poljica were allied with the Ban of Croatia, Mladen Šubić, who fought against Croatian pretenders at the Battle of Bliska in the hinterland of Trogir. In 1344 Morolacorum were mentioned in lands around Knin and Krbava, within the conflict of counts from Kurjaković and Nelipić families, and that they could shelter their livestock on the islands of Rab, Hvar, and Brač. In 1345 they are mentioned in the charter by king Louis I of Hungary to the Nelipić family, to whom was confiscated Knin in exchange for Sinj and other fortresses in Cetina county with all "with their inhabitants, Croats and Vlachs".

In 1352, in the agreement in which Zadar sold salt to the Republic of Venice, in which Zadar retained part of the salt that Morlachi and others exported by land. In the 1357 charter of Šibenik was imposed a provision that Vlachs must not use the city lands for pasture without authority. In 1362, the Morlachorum, unauthorized, settled on Trogir land but were allowed to use it for pasture for a few months.

In 1383, Vlachs around Šibenik, which partially belonged to Queen Elizabeth and the noble Ivan III Nelipić, were causing problems, and citizens wrote to the queen asking for help. The queen warned the Ban of Croatia, Emerik, and ordered him to send Vlachs away from the city lands and take fines from them, from which a part was to be given to the citizens. In 1387, when nobles from the Budislavić family from Krbava confirmed with a charter the privileges of the citizens of the city Pag, it was determined that Vlachs must not use the city lands for pasture. In the Statute of Senj dating to 1388, the Frankopans mentioned Morowlachi and defined the amount of time they had for pasture around river Gacka when they descended from the mountains.

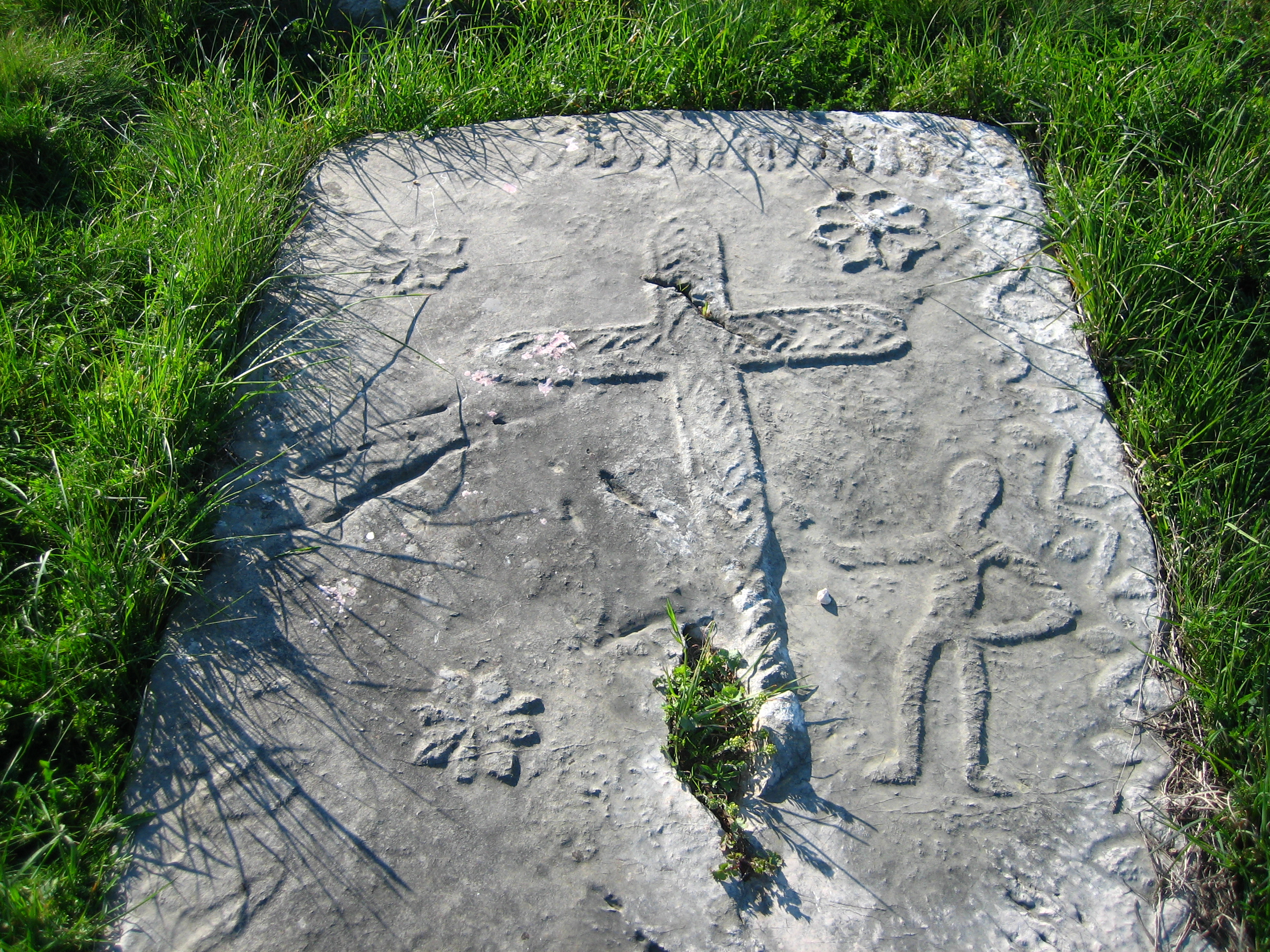
Example of a Vlach/Morlach medieval tombstone

Some scholars consider that the alleged Vlach migration in the 14th century to the Dalmatian Zagora was preceded by the Black Death, which enabled permanent Vlach colonization and the pasture of animals on desolated land. This migration would be followed with the sudden appearance of stećak tombstones in Cetina county, showing the cultural specificity of the newly arrived communities. The particular appearance of the stećaks indicates a separate socio-cultural identity, to whom the afterlife was important, as well as socio-professional prosperity for such valuable burials.

In the 1376 and 1454 documents by the Republic of Dubrovnik regarding trade with Bosnian lands, Vlachi et Bosgnani are distinguished. In Bosnian documents they are first mentioned in c. 1234 by Ban Matej Ninoslav, and from 1361 to 1417, royal Vlachs of Bosnian bans and kings were mentioned. On 13 April 1411, Bosnian Duke Sandalj Hranić sold the Croatian town Ostrovica, which was a gift from King Ladislaus of Naples to the Republic of Venice. A year later on 10 April 1412, the Murlachos (probably in service of King Sigismund) captured the Ostrovica Fortress from Venice. In August 1417, Venetian authorities were concerned with the "Morlachs and other Slavs" from the hinterland, that were a threat to security in Šibenik.

In 1405 and 1421, morolakis seu olakonibus and wolachos sugari lived on the lands of Ostrovica Lička, today near Gospić in Lika. During the 15th century, the Vlach population in Croatia expanded so significantly that they were sometimes mentioned as a distinct entity along the Croatians. In 1412 King Sigismund bestowed the Sinj county and Travnik fortress to Ivan III Nelipić, and mentioned that Croats and Vlachs were at his disposal (cum universis Croatis et Vlahis). In the so-called Pašman Breviary (1431) Croats and Vlachs enslaved by the Turks were distinguished. On 6 August 1432, the Ragusians reported to King Sigismund that the Turks had invaded the Croatian lands and captured many Croats and Vlachs. In 1432, on the order of King Sigismund, Morlachs were required for military service and to gather at the ban's camp where they were joined by the "whole of the Croatian Kingdom and co-existing forces of the Vlachs". In 1433 a document was released which defined the relations between "good Vlachs" and the Church of St. Ivan on the Hill in Lika, mentioning the Vlach judicial court, and that "not one Vlach among us brother Croat Vlachs will carry out any evil on the said property".

The sale of Dalmatia on 7 April 1433 by King Sigismund to the Republic of Venice earned him the enmity of Ivan Frankopan. With the death of the last Nelipić in 1435, Frankopan convinced the Vlachs to side with him by promising them the resurrection of old "Vlach laws" (previously given by the Nelipić family). The parish of Cetina law given by Ivan Frankopan on 18 March 1436 distinguishes Vlachs from Croats and Serbs and determines that the Vlachs have their own knez. These laws dated from the middle of the 14th century and included many personal rights for the Vlachs. According to the "Vlach laws", Vlachs that chose to follow Frankopan received various privileges, such as serving under Vlach commanders instead of Croatian ones, crimes committed in the town of Sinj would be judged by a Vlach magistrate rather than a Croatian one, the Croatian prince of Cetina would not be permitted to appoint a voivode (prince) over them, and Croats would be restricted to having only one Vlach as their shepherd. Encouraged by these promises, the Vlachs attacked nearby littoral towns under Venetian control, but in 1436 on behalf of King Sigismund, the Ban of Croatia Matko Talovac waged war against Ivan Frankopan who did not manage to survive.

As they previously supported Frankopan, the Vlachs from Cetina now were persecuted, resulting the Vlachs being informed on 2 July 1436 of a signed peace treaty between Talovac and Venice that forbade further attacks on Venetian towns, but it was not always respected. The persecution was also in part due to the new conflict between Talovac and herzog Stjepan Vukčić Kosača who at the time had capital in Imotski. Kosača managed to conquer in 1440 Omiš and Poljica, but lost them to Venice in 1444. From this time are dated stećaks from Bisko. In 1444 conflicts between Talovac and Vlachs again re-emerged, with the estates of Vlachs Mikul Dudanović, Radoj Gerdanić and their siblings being given to the widow of Šimun Keglević. This resulted with the migration of Morlachs from the Talovac estates in Cetina to Poljica under Venice control in 1446.

The Vlachs of Lika were ruled by Croatian princes and bishops, while Vlachs who lived along the Cetina river were more autonomous and were governed by Vlach princes, dukes and judges. They also paid more favorable taxes and were free from paying for pasture for their cattle. However, they were not completely free citizens and faced restrictions such as prohibitions on becoming court witnesses, jurors and officers. Their rights were contained in the "Vlach Paper" from 1476, which itself is an extension of the "Vlach Laws" from 1436. Both of these were written in Cyrillic and kept in the Franciscan monastery in Trsat. Also, during this period, large numbers of Vlachs were traded or used as gifts between Croatian nobles, and local churches.

In the summer of 1448 during warfare around Šibenik, the city's authority complained in Venice about Morlachs and Croats who were subordinate to the Ban of Croatia. In 1463, Vlachs from the de genere Thwlich (Tulić) in the župa of Vrlika were mentioned, gifted by King Matthias Corvinus to the local Croatian nobel Ivan Čubretić. In 1481, some Vlachs were settled in Lika by the king. In 1486 and 1487 Vlachs were mentioned at the Zrmanja river region, around the Kegalj-grad, because of land disputes with Keglević nobles. In the late 1480s they were mentioned in Dubašica and Poljica on the island Krk: corvati et morlacchi. In 1504 a document from Krk mentions "...every Christian, nobleman and peasant, Vlach or Croat". In the 1504 document about war tributes, besides from Vrlika, Vlachs from Knin (Tinninienses), Obrovac (Obrowacz) and Nutjak were also mentioned.

Another group or Vlach term besides Morlachs was Ćići (Ger. Tschitsche). In the early 15th century it was mentioned as a surname in Istria, while in 1463 it was mentioned by priest Fraščić as a group who, under Ivan Frankopan, plundered Istrian territory below the Učka mountains. In 1499, the Carinthian parish priest Jakob Urnest mentioned a Czyschnlandt territory between the Croatian and Bosnian kingdoms, which some consider to be the Cetina river region in southern Croatia. In penal records of Trieste from the year 1500, there is an inscription of an accused who, when asked of his home country, replied Ciccio da Segna (Senj), while another man declared himself as Ciccio da S. Michele di Leme (Lim valley in Istria). In 1523 and 1527, Tschizen aus Krabatten were settled in the estate of Lupoglav were settled. In 1528, Tschitschen were mentioned regarding the possible settlement of Modruš and other lands as a resistance against Martolosi. In 1530, they were prohibited from purchasing grain in Novo Mesto and Metlika in Lower Carniola. In 1539, royal commissioner Erasmo von Thurn submitted a request by Ćići to King Ferdinand to give them some deserted karst land in Istria. Also, previously in 1530, general commander Nikola Jurišić mentioned Vlachs who were commonly called Ćići (Valachi, quos vulgo Zytschn vocant), while Slovenian diplomat Benedikt Kuripešič in his travel through Bosnia mentioned his use of Zitzen and Zigen as exonym, along with Vlach and Martolosi, for the Serbs and Orthodox immigrants in Bosnia which came from Smederevo and Greek Belgrade (Smedraw and griechisch Weussenburg). In October 1538 the captain of Bihać, Erazmo Thurn, wrote to King Ferdinand I that Ćići from Istria (die issterreichischen Zittschen), who were around Ottoman-occupied Obrovac, moved to the king's land with many men and 40,000 cattle.

=== Ottoman conquest and the Austrian Empire ===
Vlach migrations to the Austrian Empire from the Ottoman Empire, and vice versa, were generally caused by the loss of financial status or privileges of Vlach laws, rather than from any form of ethnic or religious persecution. Usually the migrations were caused by turbulent events or occurred in periods afterwards, like the Battle of Mohács (1526), the conquest of Dalmatia (1522), Lika and Krbava (1527–1528), and subsequent battles. Many Vlachs served in Ottoman armies during their conquests. As part of the military, they often served either as light cavalry or infantrymen, or irregular soldiers (martolosi). However, since the movements of large Ottoman armies towards Inner Austria were rarely routed through Croatia-Slavonia, and military actions were focused on the vicinity of Jajce and Bihać, the role of the Uskok-Vlachs spying on the Ottomans was particularly important. In the 15th century after the fall of the Bulgarian Empire under the Sultan's rule, many of the Vlachs arrived in the area between Drava and Sava (Slavonia at that time) and part of them continued their journey across the Drava to Hungary. Between the fourteenth and sixteenth centuries, Christians on the Balkan Peninsula fled from the Ottomans to Austrian, Hungarian and Venetian territories; Orthodox Slavs and Vlachs fled into Bosnia and Herzegovina and Dalmatia or they fled across the Danube. Ottoman Vlachs who colonized Dalmatia, Croatia, Slavonia, western parts of Bosnia and Hungary to some extent were Catholic, which can be seen in Venetian and Habsburg sources (Morlachi Catholici in Dalmatia and Rasciani catolici, Katolische Ratzen, Meerkroaten, Illiri, Horvati etc. in Croatia and Hungary).

The Serb, Vlach and Uskok colonization of Žumberak started between 1526 and 1538, at the same time when in Ottoman-conquered lands Vlach laws were partially or completely repealed until 1550, causing migration due to social and financial status. In June 1531, around 1,000 Vlachs, advised by Ivan Katzianer, settled in Kostel and Polajna, along the Kupa River near Žumberak, of which 700 were fit for military service. King Ferdinand I in September 1538 responded to general commander Nikola Jurišić, who informed him about some Servian or Rascian captains and dukes who were willing to come with their people to serve in military service, and that they were given privileges. In October of the same year, Jurišić informed the King that Ban Petar Keglević and other nobles came from Ottoman-conquered territory around the river Cetina with many Sirfen (Serbs). In the same letter, Jurišić informed the king about the Vlachs who "in our (Croatian) parts are called as Old Romans" (alt Römer genennt), and who came with others from Turkish areas (the river Zrmanja), to be given the same promises and privileges which were given to the Serbs. In November, Ferdinand wrote to Keglević about "captains and dukes of the Rasians or the Serbs, and the Vlachs who are commonly called the Zytschy (Ćići)". Serbs from the Cetina part of the 1538 migration were taken care of by the captain of Bihać, Erazmo Thurn, and his men, Croatian Ban Petar Keglević, and the counts of Slunj, Zrinski, and Blagaj. Military service became the main occupation of the new population.

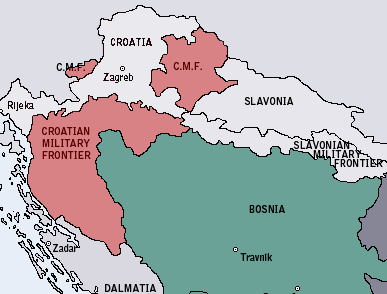
Croatian Military Frontier in 1868

In 1530, Vlachs from Lika and Srb, Unac and Glamoč came under Turkish rule. Catholic Vlachs in Prilišće and Rosopajnik settled in 1538, while in 1544 they came under the protection of Nikola Šubić Zrinski. Around 1530, some Vlachs settled in the lands of Stjepan Frankopan from Ozalj, in Otok and Hreljin, who in 1540 were mentioned for receiving a reward from King Ferdinand for their success in spying on the Turks. With the growing number of the Ottoman Vlachs passing over the Christian side, the Vlach leader from Glamoč, Ladislav Stipković, traveled to Ljubljana to offer his service, and those of his forces, to the Austrians. In a later battle, the combined forces of the army from Bihać and the Vlachs defeated an Ottoman army at Bihać.

In 1551, General Ivan Lenković reported to Ferdinand how Turks settled thousands of Morlachs and Vlachs around Srb and Kosovo field near the town of Knin. In 1560, the towns of Lišnica and Novigrad along with large parts of the Una valley, Bušević and the Krupa river, were captured, and settled with newcomers from Bosnia. In 1560, some Vlachs were settled around Ivanić-Grad, Križevci and Koprivnica.

Orthodox Vlachs were also directed to settle in Lika when Arnaud Memi-Bey became commander of Lika Sanjak. The Beylerbey of Bosnia, Hasan-Pasha Predojević, himself an Islamized Orthodox "Vlach" from Herzegovina, received the support of these Orthodox Vlachs and many served in his armies. At Predojević's order, Vlachs, as well as some Turkish nobility, settled near the towns of Brekovica, Ripač, Ostrovica and Vrla Draga up to Sokolac Fortress in such numbers that they formed a significant population in the region. In 1579, Vlachs in Turkish service wanted to transfer the towns of Cazin and Ostrožac to Christian, that is Croatian, ownership. In 1599, many Vlachs emigrated from Korenica and Bihać area to Gomirje.

In 1585, the general from Karlovac, Josip Turn, proposed Vlach settlement in Moravice, and later in 1597 General Lenković led Vlachs from Lika to Gorski Kotar and lands owned by the Frankopan family. In the Frankopan estate, Vlachs arrived yet again in 1609 and 1632. In 1605, General Vid Kisel brought Vlachs from Ostrožac to Ogulin and Bosiljevac, and some time later, Vlachs from Uzorac and Turje settled in Karlovac. In 1609, two burgs, Brlog and Gusić-Grad, were given by Senj captain and Croatian nobleman Sigismund Gusić to accommodate the newly arrived Vlachs in exchange for their military service. In 1639, Nikola Frankopan of Tržac accused Senj captain Albrecht Herberstein of settling Catholic Vlachs (Bunjevci) on his deserted estates in Jablanac, Starigrad, and Orthodox Vlachs in Brinje and Brlog, without his permission. The same happened with Zrinski in Ledenice. Under the Ottomans during the bishopric of Marcijan Lišnjić (1661–1686) around Blato and Broćno/Brotnjo in Herzegovina were mentioned "Croatian Vlachs".

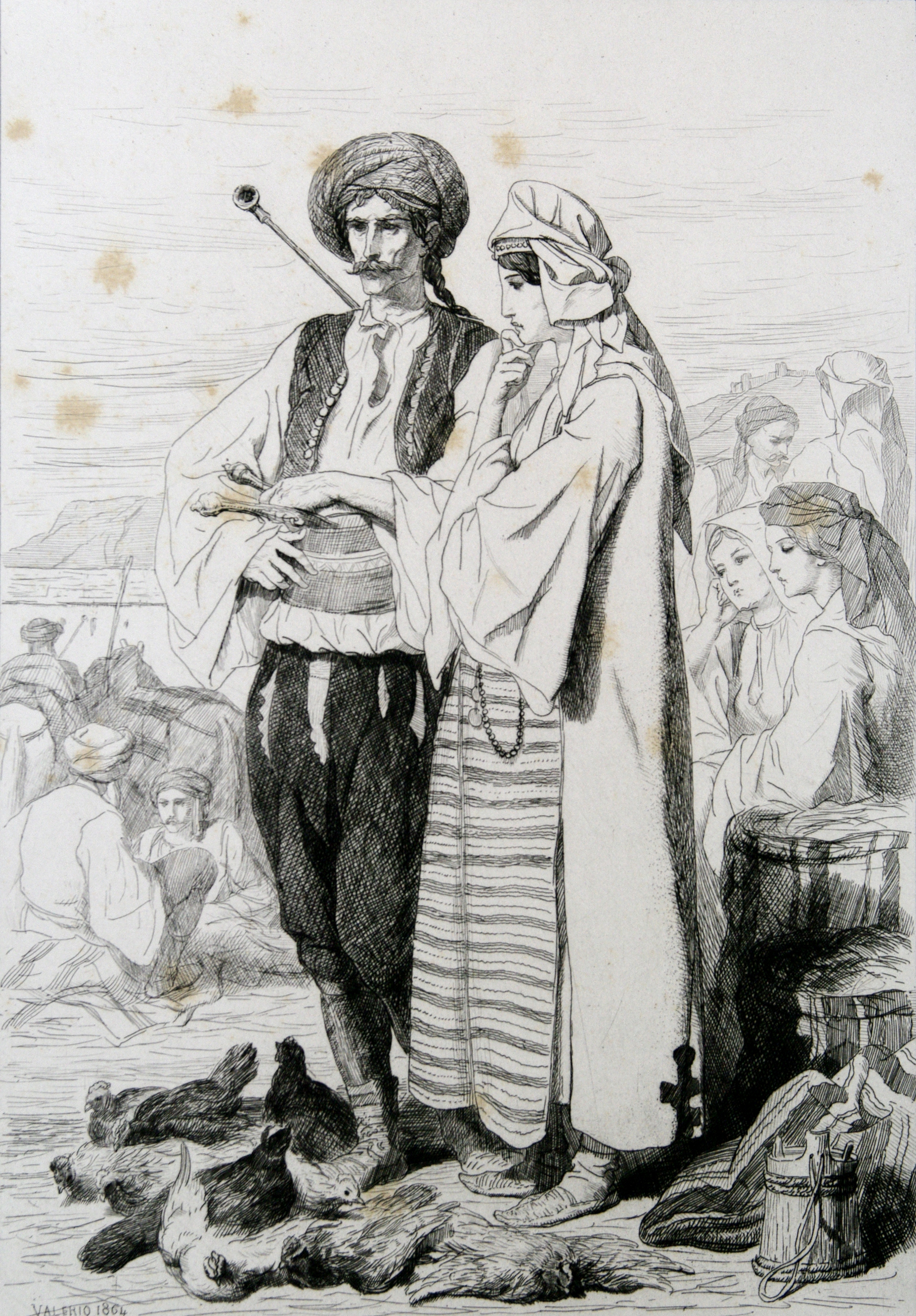
Morlach man and woman from Spalato, Théodore Valerio, 1864

After the Ottomans were defeated in Vienna in 1683, the Vlachs scattered throughout the Croatian Military Frontier. Concerned, the Turks decided to settle them on the south side of the Una river, but were unable to execute this plan. During this period, the Ottomans were vulnerable to Vlach raids from Banija and Karlovac. Vlachs, under the protection of the Ban of Croatia Miklós Erdődy and General Ivan Josip Herberstein, were also settled around Petrinja, Glina, Skradin, Vojnić, Krstinje and Budačko. After the magnate conspiracy (1670), executions and the confiscation of the Frankopan and Zrinski families' estates, Vlachs were settled under the permission of frontier generals. The abandoned village of Plaški was settled in 1666, while 120 families settled below the Budački fortress, in approximately 200 houses between Skrad, Slunj, Veljun, and Blagaj in 1686. With the liberation of Lika and Krbava in 1689, Vlachs from Kupres, Grahovo and Plavno near Knin returned to the region. Thirty individuals from Plaški were transferred to Jasenice in 1705, and 158 families were settled in the vicinity of Budački in 1711. In 1791, after the Treaty of Sistova, Orthodox Vlachs settled in new territory from Maljevac to Srb and the triangle border of Lika regiment, noted as the last of such migrations.

In the Ban's Croatia Vlachs mostly settled in the 17th century. In 1680 around 120 families were settled. In 1688 Vlachs settled in Bović, Kirin, and Gradišće. In 1718, noblewoman Marija Magdalena Drašković settled some Vlachs on her estate between the Tršca stream and village of Utinja. In 1750, an Orthodox priest and witnesses confirmed Vlachs had not previously lived around Kupa, Steničnjak, Petrova Gora and Slavsko Polje, but only around Hrvatska Kostajnica. They numbered around 4000 people.

In Slavonia, Friedrich Wilhelm von Taube wrote in the 18th century that there were many Vlachs mixed with "Illyrians" (Croats and Serbs) and who have adopted their "Illyrian" (Slavic) language.

In Dalmatia the Morlachs were immigrants who settled in the Venetian-Ottoman border, on the outskirts of coastal cities, and entered Venetian military service, in the late 16th and early 17th centuries. In 1593, provveditore generale Cristoforo Valier mentioned three nations constituting the Uskoks, the "natives of Senj, Croatians, and Morlachs from the Turkish parts". At the time of the Cretan War (1645–1669) and Morean War (1684–1699), a large number of Morlachs settled inland of the Dalmatian towns and Ravni Kotari of Zadar. According to Venetian censuses, in 1761, Orthodox Christians made up 31,211 of the total population numbering 220,287; in 1771, 38,652 out of 223,765; in 1781, 51,996 out of 236,997.

The settlement of the Vlachs in Croatia was beneficial to the Austrian Empire as the Emperor was reluctant to return the Military Frontier to Croatia. Further settlement of Vlachs was encouraged by the Austrian government, but this antagonised the Sabor (the Croatian Parliament) and resulted in the passing of various laws on 21 February 1629, guaranteeing certain privileges to the Vlachs. For example, any Vlach willingly becoming a subject of the Kingdom of Croatia was exempt from becoming a serf, rendering Vlachs almost equal with native Croatians. The laws enacted by the Emperor of the Austrian Empire and Sabor are collectively known as Statuta Valachorum. The exemption of the Vlachs from serfdom can be compared to the same exemption for native Croats, which was not applied until 1848 during the rule of Josip Jelačić. To ensure cooperation from the Vlachs, Austrian generals conducted a propaganda campaign focusing on Vlach serfdom under Croatian rule. This activity prevented the Croatian envoy to the Austrian court, Benedikt Vinković, who was there to consult on the "Vlach question", from pursuing a union of the Vlach-settled Military Frontier with Croatia.

== Legacy ==
Many scholars consider that Vlachs since the 16th century has referred to pastoralists (social status), being a common name for Serbs and other Slavs in the Ottoman Empire and later. Tihomir Đorđević considered that the term Vlach did not only refer to genuine Vlachs or Serbs but also to cattle breeders in general. Bogumil Hrabak emphasized that not all cattle breeders and shepherds in the Balkans were called Vlachs, an example being the Arbanasi. According to Zef Mirdita, there is a clear distinction between the Serb ethnic community and the Vlachs as seen in Serbian medieval documents mentioning "Vlachs" separately from "Serbs", and for example, the prohibition of intermarriage between Serbs and Vlachs by Emperor Stefan Dušan (in Dušan's Code). However, as argued by John V. A. Fine Jr., "a more detailed examination of the code shows that it was in fact occupational". Mirdita noted that the Vlachs were always mentioned as an ethnic group and were in the process of Slavicization which was not completed in the 15th century. According to Sima Ćirković, documents from the 13th to the 15th centuries show that the Vlachs were considered by the Serbs as "others" i.e. different from themselves, while documentation on that particular issue is scarce, so it is very difficult to conclude how the difference was perceived. Orthodox Vlach groups whose migrations were not accompanied by an ecclesiastical infrastructure were Catholicised and assimilated. According to Marko Šarić, the Serb identity was finalized among the Orthodox Vlachs in Lika and Krbava after the establishment of the Serbian Orthodox eparchies of Zrinopolje and Lika-Krbava in 1695, which would be later unified into the Eparchy of upper Karlovac. He noted that the Catholic Vlachs (i.e. Bunjevci) were integrated into the Croatian nation. In a study on Western Balkan households and families, Austrian historian of historical anthropology Karl Kaser also noted that the Catholic Vlachs (Bunjevci) were absorbed by the Croat community while Orthodox Vlachs were absorbed by the Serbian community. Some scholars like Noel Malcolm consider Bosnian Serbs to have a large element of non-Slavic ancestry (Vlach) and that the national concepts of Croats and Serbs are 19th- and 20th-century constructs. Historian Ilona Czamańska has a similar view, who also considers the Serbisation of the Vlachs connected to the system of the Ottoman state through military duty which was indirectly supported by the Ottoman rule because the Vlachs belonged under the civil authority of the Serbian Orthodox Patriarch.

The exact ethnic identity of the Frontier Vlachs (and in part the ancestors of the Krajina Serbs) is complex and at present unexplained without at least some national ideologies and mythologization which emerged in the 19th century. The dispersion of Orthodox Vlachs and Serbs in the present-day territory of Croatia, who mostly inhabited the historical borderland Military Frontier (Krajina), was a cultural, linguistic, and political factor used by extreme ideologies from both Serbia and Croatia. Drago Roksandić and Marko Šarić noted that the modern South Slavic national revival and historiography since the 19th century tried to see and interpret its own national history through the present-day situation, like an "ethnocentric mirror that shows the present". The picture they tried to present of the Vlachs was most commonly simplified, uncritical, and acted constructed, resulting in historiographic disputes. In the work About the Vlachs from 1806, Metropolitan Stevan Stratimirović stated that Roman Catholics from Croatia and Slavonia scornfully used the name Vlach for "the Slovenians (Slavs) and Serbs, who are of our, Eastern confession (Orthodoxy)", and that "the Turks in Bosnia and Serbia also call every Bosnian or Serbian Christian a Vlach". Scholars like Vuk Stefanović Karadžić, Ferdo Šišić, Vjekoslav Klaić, and Petar Skok vaguely argued according to the ideologies of the time that the Vlachs lacked national consciousness, belonged to the Serbs or Croats, that Orthodoxy made them Serbs, or that due to them being mainly Orthodox, Roman Catholic priests began to identify them with the Serbs and Rascians, which was eventually adopted. Hrabak emphasized that South Slavic scholarship and Serbian nationalists tried to neglect or minimize the contribution of Vlachs in their ethnogenesis and history because the old-Balkan element insulted their idea of pure Slavs. Jaroslav Šidak pointed out that after the term received a new derogatory connotation in Historija naroda Jugoslavije II ("History of the Peoples of Yugoslavia II", 1959) the issue was avoided by writing vlachs in lowercase, in the sense of a social term. Ben Fowkes argues that to apply the term Vlach to someone, was to say that they were either nomads or free peasant-soldiers. It did not imply a definitive conclusion about their ethnic group and that the Krajina Serbs who lived in Croatia until driven out recently, were also described officially as Vlachs

Extreme Croatian historiography (including Ustashe propaganda) tries to completely neglect the Serb component, contribution, or origin of Vlachs. In Croatian historiography, other theories have been proposed. According to Ivo Banac, Orthodox Slavicized Vlachs gradually acquired Serb national consciousness because most South Slavic Orthodox Christians belonged to the Serbian Patriarchate of Peć with whom these Vlachs assimilated through their church organization. Others like Mirko Valentić claim that the Vlachs were Serbianized only in the 19th century. The Vlach origin of the Roman Catholic Bunjevci due to their well-integration in the Croatian population was ignored. The term Vlach was weaponized by some Croatian nationalists during the Croatian War of Independence by applying it to Serbs in order to diminish Serbian territorial and historical claims to Croatia.

Extreme Serbian historiography claims that all Dinaric and Shtokavian cultural-linguistic attributes are without exception Serbian, and also often stresses the ethnic-demographic discontinuity, wanting to prove that the Croatian Military Frontier lost its native Croatian population and received a new Serbian majority, and also downplays the Croatian and overemphasizes the Serbian role in the history of the Military Frontier. Likewise to the Croatian claims during the 1990s, tendentious Serbian claims to certain rights are argued based on historical privileges granted to them (or to Vlachs) by the Habsburgs. Serbian historiography strongly considers that the term Vlach indicated status and not ethnos, and that they did not exist in later centuries as an ethnic group, yet were true Serbs. Sima Ćirković noted that the name was maintained due to different crafts, their way of life and distinct form of social organization until the differences lost their meaning, with the Slavicization process lasting centuries; he considered Serbs to have absorbed many Vlachs and other ethnic groups. According to Zlatko Kudelić, the term Vlach has a broader meaning and denotes the entire Krajina population but is also a confessional label for Orthodox Grencers who are referred to as Serbs in Serbian historiography.

In recent decades, the extent in which Orthodox Vlachs and Serbs lived in previous centuries (Military Frontier, Srijem, Baranja, etc.) by Serb separatists was seen as a borderline between Croatia and self-proclaimed autonomous regions within Croatian territory, the SAO Krajina, SAO Western Slavonia and SAO Eastern Slavonia, Baranja and Western Syrmia, and the eventual Republic of Serbian Krajina (1991–1995), during the Croatian international recognition and War in Croatia which lasted from 1991 until 1995. Croatian historian Drago Roksandić claimed in 1991, before the war escalated, that until today, the "Vlach question" (Vlaško pitanje) had caused and still caused many disagreements between experts and non-experts in ex-Yugoslavian countries, as well as in the other Balkan countries with Vlach communities. Vlach heritage has had a remarkable impact on modern Serbs, Croats and Bosnians.

In 1948, one person was registered as Vlach; in 1953, two; in 1961, 34; in 1971, 13; in 1981, 16; in 1991, 22; in 2001, 12; and in 2011, 29.

== See also ==
- Statuta Valachorum (Vlach law)
- Vlachs in medieval Serbia
- Vlachs in medieval Bosnia
- Vlach (Ottoman social class)

== Sources ==
- Banac, Ivo (1988). The National Question in Yugoslavia: Origins, History, Politics. Cornell University Press. ISBN 9780801494932.
- Fine, John V. A. (2006). When ethnicity did not matter in Balkans: a study of identity in pre-nationalist Croatia, Dalmatia and Slavonia in the medieval and pre-modern periods. University of Michigan. ISBN 978-0-472-11414-6.
- Klaić, Vjekoslav (1973). Povijest Hrvata (in Croatian). Vol. 5. Zagreb: Matica hrvatska.
- Roksandić, Drago (1991). Srbi u Hrvatskoj od 15. stoljeća do naših dana (PDF) (in Serbo-Croatian). Zagreb: Vjesnik.
- Roksandić, Drago (2003). Triplex Confinium ili o granicama i regijama hrvatske povijesti 1500-1800 (PDF) (in Croatian). Zagreb: Barbat. ISBN 953-181-051-6.
- Šišić, Ferdo (1908). Hrvatska povijest: Drugi dio: od godine 1526. do godine 1790 (in Croatian). Zagreb: Matica hrvatska. ( Public domain)
- Szabo, Gjuro (2002) [1939]. Ivan Mužić (ed.). Starosjeditelji i Hrvati [Natives and Croats] (in Croatian). Split: Laus. ISBN 953-190-118-X.
- Tomasevich, Jozo (2001). War and revolution in Yugoslavia, 1941-1945: occupation and collaboration. Board of Trustees of Leland Stanford Junior University. ISBN 0-8047-3615-4.
- Kaser, Karl (2012). Household and Family in the Balkans. LIT Verlag Münster. p. 625. ISBN 978-3643504067.
- Botica, Ivan (2005). "Prilog istraživanju najstarijega spomena vlaškoga imena u hrvatskoj historiografiji" (PDF). Radovi. 37. Zagreb: Zavod za hrvatsku povijest: 35–46. ISSN 0353-295X.
- Feldman, Lada; Prica, Ines (1993). Fear, death, and resistance: an ethnography of war: Croatia, 1991-1992. Institute of Ethnology and Folklore Research.
- Milošević, Ante (1991). Stećci i Vlasi: Stećci i vlaške migracije 14. i 15. stoljeća u Dalmaciji i jugozapadnoj Bosni [Stećaks (Standing Tombstones) and Migrations of the Vlasi (Autochthonous Population) in Dalmatia and Southwestern Bosnia in the 14th and 15th Centuries] (in Croatian). Split: Regionalni zavod za zaštitu spomenika kulture.
- Mirdita, Zef (2004). Vlasi u historiografiji (in Croatian). Zagreb: Croatian Institute of History. ISBN 953-6324-43-1.
- Ćirković, Sima (2004). The Serbs. Malden: Blackwell Publishing. ISBN 9781405142915.
- Mirdita, Zef (2009). Vlasi, starobalkanski narod: od povijesne pojave do danas (Vlachs, an old Balkan people: from their first historical appearance until today). Zagreb: Croatian Institute of History. ISBN 978-9-536-32483-5.
- Mužić, Ivan (2009). "Vlasi i starobalkanska pretkršćanska simbolika jelena na stećcima". Starohrvatska Prosvjeta (in Croatian). III (36). Split: Museum of Croatian Archaeological Monuments: 315–349.
- Mužić, Ivan (2010). "Vlasi i starobalkanska pretkršćanska simbolika jelena na stećcima". In Mužić, Ivan (ed.). Vlasi u starijoj hrvatskoj historiografiji (PDF) (in Croatian). Split: Muzej hrvatskih arheoloških spomenika. ISBN 978-953-6803-25-5. Archived from the original on 2011-07-21.
- Lopašić, Radoslav (2010) [1890, 1894, 1879]. "Cetinski i lički Vlasi / O eparhiji karlovačkoj". In Mužić, Ivan (ed.). Vlasi u starijoj hrvatskoj historiografiji (PDF) (in Croatian). Split: Muzej hrvatskih arheoloških spomenika. ISBN 978-953-6803-25-5. Archived from the original on 2011-07-21.
- Hrabak, Bogumil (2010). "Naseljavanje hercegovačkih i bosanskih Vlaha u Dalmatinsku Zagoru u XIV, XV i XVI veku". In Mužić, Ivan (ed.). Vlasi u starijoj hrvatskoj historiografiji (PDF) (in Croatian). Split: Muzej hrvatskih arheoloških spomenika. ISBN 978-953-6803-25-5. Archived from the original on 2011-07-21.
- Klaić, Vjekoslav (2010) [1880]. "Vlasi u Hrvatskoj tečajem 14. i 15. stoljeća". In Mužić, Ivan (ed.). Vlasi u starijoj hrvatskoj historiografiji (PDF) (in Croatian). Split: Muzej hrvatskih arheoloških spomenika. ISBN 978-953-6803-25-5. Archived from the original on 2011-07-21.
- Pavičić, Stjepan (2010) [1931]. "Starosjedilaštvo današnjeg hrvatskog naselja u Srednjoj i Sjevernoj Dalmaciji. Prilog k proučavanju porijekla Bunjevaca". In Mužić, Ivan (ed.). Vlasi u starijoj hrvatskoj historiografiji (PDF) (in Croatian). Split: Muzej hrvatskih arheoloških spomenika. pp. 61–104. ISBN 978-953-6803-25-5. Archived from the original on 2011-07-21.
- Murvar, Vatroslav (2010) [1953]. "Nasiljem spriječena asimilacija Vlaha sa narodom i zemljom Hrvata". In Mužić, Ivan (ed.). Vlasi u starijoj hrvatskoj historiografiji (PDF) (in Croatian). Split: Muzej hrvatskih arheoloških spomenika. ISBN 978-953-6803-25-5. Archived from the original on 2011-07-21.
- Pavičić, Stjepan (1962). "Seobe i naselja u Lici" [Migrations and settlements in Lika]. Zbornik za narodni život i običaje: Antropografska istraživanja III (in Croatian). 41: 5–295.
- Ribarić, Josip (2002) [1916]. "O istarskim dijalektima: razmještaj južnoslavenskih dijalekata na poluotoku Istri s opisom vodičkog govora". Istarska baština (in Croatian). 5. Pazin: Josip Turčinović.
- Suppan, Arnold; Graf, Maximilian (2010). From the Austrian Empire to the Communist East Central Europe. Lit Verlag. ISBN 978-3-643-50235-3.
- Šarić, Marko (2009). Holjevac, Željko (ed.). "Predmoderne etnije u Lici i Krbavi prema popisu iz 1712./14" (PDF). Identitet Like: Korijeni I Razvitak (in Croatian). 1. Zagreb: Institut društvenih znanosti Ivo Pilar. ISBN 978-953-6666-65-2. Archived from the original (PDF) on 2015-09-24.
- Šimunović, Petar (2010). "Lička toponomastička stratigrafija" [Toponomastic stratigraphy of Lika]. Folia onomastica Croatica (19): 223–246.
