= Maleševci (tribe) =

Historical tribe and region of Herzegovina

Maleševci (Serbian Cyrillic: Малешевци) was a historical Vlach katun of Herzegovina that existed in the Late Middle Ages.

== Origins ==
The Maleševci are mentioned alongside numerous Herzegovinian katuns in the 14th and 15th archives from Dubrovnik and Kotor, where they are described as Vlachs. The name Maleševci is the plural of Maleševac, itself derived from the personal name Maleš, the likely founder of the tribe. Apart from the tribe, Maleš is attested in two Vlach katuns from the Prizren estate, in the 14th century. It also gave the patronymic names Malešev and Malešević, and might be related to the toponym Maleševo, found in several locations in present-day Serbia and Bulgaria.

== History ==
=== Middle Ages ===
The earliest known written record referring to the tribe is a Ragusan document, written on January 14, 1374, addressing de Malleseva tribe-clan. They were part of a large group of Herzegovinian Vlachs, led by the katunar Stanko Perutinić (first mentioned in 1397) and his brothers and descendants in the late 14th and early 15th centuries. The Maleševci katun developed on the territory of Rudine, Kuta and Korita, and the name Perutinić sometime replaced the name Maleševci, but the latter prevailed.

In 1422 as katunars were recorded Klapac Stanković and Radosav Milićević, later Dubravac Milićević (1428), Stanoje Stanković (1434), Vukac Dubravčić (1461-1468). Stanko Perutinić had three brothers, Milić, Miloš and Hrebeljan, and with their heirs were vassals of Pavlović, while Stanko's heirs of Kosača (Sandalj Hranić, Stjepan Vukčić Kosača) noble family. From 1466 are recorded under Ottoman rule. They like Vlachs from other tribes sometime collaborated with Ottomans as slave agents.

== Families ==
Many Serbian Orthodox families were members of Maleševci katun. Characteristic for the tribe-clan in Herzegovina is that all families have the Serbian Orthodox slava (patron saint feast day) of St. Ignatius.

== People ==
By ancestry;

- Milan Aleksić, Water polo player
- Jevto Dedijer, Bosnian Serb anthropologist
- Stevan Dedijer, scientist; son of Jevto Dedijer
- Vladimir Dedijer, Tito's biographer and historian; son of Jevto Dedijer
- Žarko Paspalj, Serbian basketball player
- Jovan Maleševac, Serbian Orthodox monk and scribe

== See also ==
- Vlachs in medieval Bosnia and Herzegovina
- Tribes of Montenegro
- Serbs of Bosnia and Herzegovina

== Sources ==
- Kurtović, Esad (2011). "Seniori hercegovačkih vlaha". Hum i Hercegovina kroz povijest. Zbornik radova s međunarodnoga znanstvenog skupa održanog u Mostaru 5. i 6. studenoga 2009 (in Croatian). Zagreb: Hrvatski institut za povijest. pp. 647–695.
- Pekić, Radmilo B. (2016). "Maleševci in Bileća's Rudine". Zbornik radova Filozofskog fakulteta u Prištini. 46 (3): 21–51. doi:10.5937/zrffp46-12089.
- Grković, Milica (1986). Rečnik imena Banjskog, Dečanskog i Prizrenskog vlastelinstva u XIV veku [Dictionary of names of the Banjska, Dečani and Prizren estates in the 14th century] (in Serbian). Belgrade: Narodna knjiga. ISBN 9788633100243.
