= Komanice =

Coordinates: 44.2500°N 20.1092°E

- Village (Selo)
- Interactive map of Komanice
- Country: Serbia
- District: Kolubara District
- Municipality: Mionica
- Time zone: UTC+1 (CET)
  - Summer (DST): UTC+2 (CEST)

Komanice is a village situated in Mionica municipality in Serbia.

The settlement was recorded as a hamlet and as "Komaniçe" in the Ottoman Tahrir Defter number 94 from 1520. Moreover, in the Tahrir Defter number 151 from 1528 the village had Voynuk households under the Voynugan-ı Istabl-ı Amire military branch, which were Ottoman Christian Soldiers and were tax-exempt.
