= Hrabak =

Hrabak is a surname. Notable people with the surname include:

- Bogumil Hrabak (1927–2010), Yugoslav-Serbian historian
- Dietrich Hrabak (1914–1995), German fighter pilot
- Mike Hrabak (born 1979), Filipino-Turkish basketball player
