= Vlachs (Ottoman social class) =

Social and fiscal class in Ottoman lands

Vlachs (Latin: Valachi; Ottoman Turkish: Eflak, pl. Eflakân; Serbo-Croatian: Vlah / Влах, pl. Vlasi / Власи) was a social and fiscal class in several late medieval states of Southeastern Europe, and also a distinctive social and fiscal class within the millet system of the Ottoman Empire, composed largely of Eastern Orthodox Christians who practiced nomadic and semi-nomadic pastoral lifestyle, including populations in various migratory regions, mainly composed of ethnic Serbs, Vlachs and Albanians. From the middle decades of the 17th century the amalgamation of the process of sedentarization of the Orthodox Vlachs and their gradual fusion with Serbian rural population reached a high level and was officially recognized by the Ottoman authorities.

== Origins ==
Following the Ottoman conquest of the Balkans, the Vlachs, being both Orthodox and Catholic, and still a largely nomadic and semi-nomadic pastoral non-Slavic-speaking people, played a dual role in the relations with the new Ottoman ruler. Although a few of the Orthodox Vlachs and part of the Catholic Vlachs from Duklja and Bosnia fled before the invading Ottoman armies, to Christian lands in the West (i.e. Croatia and Ragusa); the remaining of them, both Orthodox in the central Balkans and Catholics in Herzegovina and Duklja, welcomed with joy the new situation created, since the conquerors vouchsafed to them vast ranges for themselves and their cattle and promised to improve their social position. It thus propitiated special arrangements between the Turks and the Vlachs, who in turn, while preserving their religion (excepting some, largely high-ranking members of society, who converted to Islam in order to secure for themselves and their families special privileges and prominent administrative positions from the Ottoman authorities), placed themselves in the Sultan's service; all this made possible that the Vlachs would come to form a considerably privileged class within the Millet system in the Ottoman Empire, compared to the class of the Reaya, for more than a century. In medieval Serbia the term Vlachs had more meaning, primarily denote the inhabitants of Aromanian origin and also dependent shepherds in the medieval Serbian state. In addition, with the beginning of Ottoman rule, within this social class also came to be included other Vlach-like (pastoral semi-nomad) populations, such as cattle-breeding Orthodox Serbs;. Serbs in Ottoman Hungary in great numbers served as Martolos, which were Christian origin members largely recruited from the Vlach and Vlach like population.

== Service ==
During the early history of the Ottoman Empire in the Balkans, there was Vlach people members of military class living in Serbia and Macedonia which had the same rights as Muslims. They might have been the descendants of Christians but their origin is not entirely clear.

Due to their experience in carrying goods and the skill and speed with which they crossed the mountain regions; the Turks began to take advantage of it by employing them as auxiliary troops (voynuk), thus entrusting to them the conveyance of military supplies, the carrying out of spying operations and quick looting-scorching raids in enemy Christian territory, and the patrol of mountain gorges and boundaries in general. In addition, they always accompanied the Ottoman armies in their expeditions throughout the Balkans, up to the North-West, in whole communities; being intended for populating the newly conquered territories as border military colonies, called katun or džemaat (which were composed of about 20 to 50 houses); at the head of which there was a katunar or primikur ("headman"). They also formed important as well as highly numbered Christian military garrisons (martolos) attached to the Ottoman army, in the newly conquered towns. In exchange for their regular duties, they were granted privileges which were denied to all other Zimmîs by the Šerijat or Islamic Law; for example, as they served regularly as Ottoman auxiliary troops, they were allowed to bear arms and to ride horses. This rewarding privileges were also extended to the economic sphere; these communities were largely exempted of paying any tax but only that of an annual rent of one gold 'ducat' or 'florin' to pay by each one of their households, hence coming to be called as "Florin" or "Ducat Vlachs" (Ottoman Turkish: Filurîci Eflakân). At the same time, great Turkish and Slavic Muslim landholding military nobles (Sipahi and Timarli) often brought with them significant quantities of these Vlachs (sometimes Serbs as well), in order that they farmed their lands.

== Decline ==
However, during the course of time, with centralisation and changes to state structure, the economic system and military organisation occurring, many of the services that the Vlachs used to provide for the Ottomans became superfluous. As a result, the 1520s saw the beginning of Vlach sedentarisation and a reduction of their privileges. By the end of the 16th century, these privileges resulted in the majority of Vlachs’ social standing being equalled to that of the filurîci, and later with ordinary reaya peasants. Lastly, the sound Ottoman defeat at Sisak in 1593 triggered the beginning of loss of faith by these Vlachs, (both genuine Vlachs and Serbs) in those who until then had been their masters, and propitiated the passing of the Vlachs and the Serbs over to the Habsburg side (see Uprising in Banat).

== Tax ==
The Rüsûm-i Eflakiye was a tax on Vlachs in the Ottoman Empire. Vlachs in the Balkans were granted tax concessions under Byzantine and Serb rulers in return for military service; and this continued under Ottoman rule. Instead of some of the customary taxes, they paid a special "Vlach tax", Rüsûm-i Eflakiye: One sheep and one lamb from each household on St. Georges Day each year. Because Vlachs were taxed differently, they were listed differently in defters.

== See also ==
- Vlachs
- Morlachs
- Vlachs in medieval Serbia
- Vlachs in medieval Bosnia and Herzegovina
- Vlachs in the history of Croatia
- Statuta Valachorum
- Voynuks
- Martolos
- Dervendjis
- Ottoman army in the 15th–19th centuries

== Annotations ==
1. It is reported in the Turali-beg's Vakufname of 1562, that some great Turkish and Bosnian Muslim Timari Spahije brought with them Orthodox Vlach population from the Sandžak of Smederevo into Bosnia, expressly for that very purpose.

== Sources ==
- Aleksić, Vladimir (2011). "Medieval vlach soldiers and the beginnings of Ottoman voynuks". Belgrade Historical Review. 2: 105–128.
- Bataković, Dušan T., ed. (2005). Histoire du peuple serbe [History of the Serbian People] (in French). Lausanne: L’Age d’Homme. ISBN 9782825119587.
- Ćirković, Sima (2004). The Serbs. Malden: Blackwell Publishing. ISBN 9781405142915.
- Dabić, Vojin S. (1992). "Wanderungen der Serben nach Kroatien und Slawonien vom Anfang des XVI bis Ende des XVII Jahrhunderts". Историјски часопис. 38 (1991): 43–76.
- Fine, John Van Antwerp Jr. (1991) [1983]. The Early Medieval Balkans: A Critical Survey from the Sixth to the Late Twelfth Century. Ann Arbor, Michigan: University of Michigan Press. ISBN 0472081497.
- Fine, John Van Antwerp Jr. (1994) [1987]. The Late Medieval Balkans: A Critical Survey from the Late Twelfth Century to the Ottoman Conquest. Ann Arbor, Michigan: University of Michigan Press. ISBN 0472082604.
- Fodor, Pál; Dávid, Géza, eds. (2000). Ottomans, Hungarians, and Habsburgs in Central Europe: The Military Confines in the Era of Ottoman Conquest. Leiden: Brill. ISBN 9004119078.
- Gavrilović, Danijela (2003). "Elements of Ethnic Identification of the Serbs" (PDF). Facta Universitatis. Series: Philosophy, Sociology and Psychology. 2 (10): 717–730.
- Isailović, Neven (2017). "Legislation Concerning the Vlachs of the Balkans Before and After Ottoman Conquest: An Overview". State and Society in the Balkans Before and After Establishment of Ottoman Rule. Belgrade: The Institute of History. pp. 25–42. ISBN 9788677431259.
- Kursar, Vjeran (2013). "Being an Ottoman Vlach: On Vlach Identity(ies), Role and Status in Western Parts of the Ottoman Balkans (15th-18th Centuries)" (PDF). OTAM. 34. Ankara: 115–161.
- Stavrianos, Leften (2000) [1958]. The Balkans Since 1453. London: Hurst. ISBN 9781850655510.
- Sugar, Peter F. (1996) [1977]. Southeastern Europe under Ottoman Rule, 1354-1804. Seattle: University of Washington Press. ISBN 9780295803630.
