= Malešević =

Malešević (Serbian: Малешевић) is a Serbian or Croatian surname. It may refer to:

- Dragan Malešević Tapi (1949–2002), painter
- Nebojša Malešević (born 1983), fashion model
- Nikola Malešević (born 1989), basketball player
- Sinisa Malesevic (born 1969), sociologist
- Snežana Maleševič (born 1985), footballer
- Tijana Malešević (born 1991), volleyball player
