= Maritime Frontier =

The Maritime Frontier or Coastal Borderland (Latin: Confinia maritima, Maritima confinia, German: Mör Gränitz, Croatian: Primorska krajina) was an area corresponding to the Senj great captaincy and Otočac captaincy of the Croatian Military Frontier, divided physically from it by the Kapela mountain massif (thus its separation). The seat of the frontier was in Senj, and it was organized into the Karlovac Generalat. It also had some exclaves, such as on Trsat.

== Sources ==
- Moačanin, Nenad (2007). Hrvatsko-Slavonska vojna krajina i Hrvati pod vlašću osmanskoga carstva u ranome novom vijeku. Barbat. pp. 16, 26. ISBN 978-953-7534-02-8.
- Mayhew, Tea (2008). Dalmatia Between Ottoman and Venetian Rule: Contado Di Zara, 1645-1718. Viella. ISBN 978-88-8334-334-6.
