= Vlachs in medieval Serbia =

In medieval Serbia a social group known as "Vlachs" (Serbian: Власи / Vlasi) existed. While the term Vlachs had more meaning, primarily denote the inhabitants of Aromanian origin and also dependent shepherds in the medieval Serbian state.

== Background ==
=== Romance elements in the early Byzantine period ===
Following Roman withdrawal from the province of Dacia at the end of the 3rd century, the name of the Roman region was changed to Dacia Aureliana, (later Dacia Ripensis); it extended over most of what is now Serbia and Bulgaria, and an undetermined number of Romanized Dacians were settled there. A strong Roman presence persisted in the region through the end of Justinian's I reign in the 6th century.

=== Amalgamation of Slavs and Romans ===
The Slavs, settling the Balkans in the 6th and 7th centuries, absorbed the Romanized populations over the centuries. Some Romance placenames survived Slavicization, such as the names of rivers and mountains. The Old Roman culture was preserved mainly in maritime Dalmatia, while Eastern, Greek influence and linguistics prevailed in the hinterland. The linguistical border roughly went from Lezhë, below the Shkodër-Prizren road towards Lipljan and Skopje, and then towards Sofia. The Roman element in the inlands retreated into the mountains with the Slavic incursions, however, larger areas of Roman elements were preserved in some parts of inland Balkans, such as in southern Macedonia and in Carpathian regions. Romance shepherd terminology were preserved in certain areas of the Dinaric Alps. The Slavs, due to their large numbers and abundance of reserves, easily assimilated the Roman population due to the deteriorating state of the Roman Empire. The Serbs came under the Latin sphere of influence, and first came into contact with Christianity through these contacts. Serbs adopted many Latin terms, part of the vocabulary still today. With time, ties between the Slavs and Romans of the Balkans became more tighter, the larger numbered Slavs absorbing the largest part of the Roman population in the Western Balkans. The Vlach shepherds completely mixed with the Serbs, a result of the predominant pastoralist society and Christianity. Romans for long held themselves separately in the city municipalities on the coast, however, after the 10th century the Slavic inflow strengthened and subsequently the maritime cities had more or less Slavic character (such as Dubrovnik and Split, becoming holders of Slavic culture and literature in the 14th and 15th centuries). As anthropologist J. Erdeljanović noted, Serbs received cultural elements from the Vlachs, such as the stone house and cottage, parts of folk costumes, some shepherd terminology and likely some shepherding skills. Combinations of Slavic–Romance nomenclature were preserved in higher mountainous areas, and with the many migrations from the mountains into the lowlands northwards, most of the preserved old Balkan characteristics were merged into the general characteristics of all or larger parts of Serbs and Croats from the Adriatic and to the Timok river.

== History ==
Vlachs are first mentioned in 1198 living in the area between Timok and Morava which was later annexed by the Serbians in 1292, by Stefan Milutin. Also, Stefan Milutin in a deed of a gift to the monastery of Hilandar demanded that Vlachs coming to the kingdom must belong to the Holy Church, which also applied to foreigners as well as to dependent peasants. Hungarian historians who support the immigrationist theory on the origin of Romanians claim that the Serbia of 12th and 13th century with Greek-Orthodox population received a growing number of Vlach population which migrated from Dalmatian coast, Epirus, or Thessalonica and from Bulgaria after Kaliman Asen II was deposed and expelled. Vlachs in the time of Stefan Dečanski and Stefan Dušan provided the Serbian state with excellent horses for the army. The Serbian peasants and the Vlach herdsmen had disagreements with each other especially because Vlach destruction of agricultural land, forcing Serbian State to regulate the wandering shepherds and to protect its own Slav peasants with draconic laws.

Northwest of Niš there are records of Vlachs in 1382 and in Kučevo area from 1428. Suleiman the Magnificent in 1521 made a law (Canun name) for Vlachs living between Braničevo and Vidin.

== Social class ==
The vlasi (власи) or pastiri (пастири) are primarily the inhabitants of Aromanian origin and also dependent shepherds in the medieval Serbian state, part of the sebri social class. The multitude and likely prevalence of Vlachs (Romanized remnants) among the shepherds made the term "Vlachs" a synonym for shepherds, similarly as the term Srbljin was sporadically used for farmers. The status of the vlasi was basically equal to the meropsi.

== Vlachs in Nemanjić charters ==
The first mention of "Vlachs" in Serbian historical sources is the Hilandar founding charter (1198–99) by Stefan Nemanja. 170 Vlach families were mentioned in the Prizren area, granted together with villages and churches. Romance names were identified through de Radu i Đurđa. Nemanja's son, Stefan the First-Crowned, granted the Žiča monastery with 200 Vlach families from the Prokletije mountain, near Peć, Kosovo. In 1220, king Stefan proclaimed that all Vlachs of his kingdom belonged to the Eparchy of Žiča. Vlach counts (comes catuni or catunarius) were mentioned in Hvosno in 1220, 1282–98 and 1302–09. Crusader chronicles describe encounters with Vlachs in various parts of modern Serbia in the 12th and 13th centuries. King Stefan Uroš I of Serbia granted the Hilandar monastery with another 30 Vlach families from the Drim river. In the grant (around 1280) by his wife and queen, Helen of Anjou, which confirmed the grant given by Stefan Vladislav to the Vranjina monastery, the Vlachs are separately mentioned, along with Arbanasi (Albanians), Latins and Serbs. King Stefan Milutin's charter to the Banjska monastery granted it with six katuns (highland hamlets), and also made the first mention of the "Vlach law" (zakon Vlahom). In 1330, King Stefan Dečanski granted the Visoki Dečani monastery with pasture land along with Vlach and Albanian katuns around Drim and Lim rivers of whom had to carry salt and provide serf labour for the monastery. Three of the deeds of gift written by Stefan Dušan mention Vlachs together with Serbs where they are mentioned separately ("Vlachs as well as Serbs"). Granting monasteries with Vlachs continued during the reign of Emperor Stefan Uroš V (1355–71), in his charter as members of the Church of St. Nicholas in Hvosno, and 30 Vlach families as servants of Gračanica monastery, Kosovo.

According to Croatian-Albanian historian Zef Mirdita, despite the fact that the "Vlach" exonym partially meant shepherds as a socio-professional category (regardless of ethnos), the individuality and identity of the Vlachs are seen in the Banjska and Dečani charters, as well as in Dušan's Code (1349). Therein is included a prohibition of intermarriage between Serbs and Vlachs, while after Emperor Dušan conquered a large part of southeast Europe (including Macedonia, Epirus and Thessaly, that is Great Vlachia, and Albania, with significant Vlach population) he clearly differs Vlachs from Serbs and Albanians. An article provides that in the case of conflict between villagers it is punishable with a fine of 50 perper, while among Vlachs and Arbanasi of 100 perpers. Another article, on the Vlachs and Arbanasi, prohibits the overnight stay by other shepherds in villages of Vlachs or Arbanasi, and in case they did, have to pay for the amount their herds graze. The protection of Slav peasants by the Dušan's Code forced many Vlachs to migrate from Serbia. Dušan's charters of the Monastery of the Holy Archangels and Hilandar mention duties of Vlachs regarding shepherding and annual giving away of either sheep, two horses for the purpose of transporting salt and other monastery needs, mowing hay, compensation in 30 perpers or construction workers.

The medieval Vlachs in the Balkans had hybrid names, evidenting intermarriage with the Slavs.

== Legacy ==
According to Sima Ćirković, documents from 13th to the 15th century show that the Vlachs were considered by the Serbs as "others" i.e. different from themselves, while documentation on that particular issue is scarce so it is very difficult to conclude how the difference is perceived. It is also noticeable that the name "Vlach" in medieval sources has the same rank as the name "Greek", "Serb" or "Latin". According to Andre Du Nay, written records from Serbia in the 13th to 15th century mention Albanians, Vlachs, but also Serbians living in the same areas, although historical records from earlier periods do not exist certain circumstances indicate that the Vlacho–Albanian symbiosis stems from antiquity.

== See also ==
- Morlachs
- Vlach law
- Vlachs in medieval Bosnia
- Vlachs of Croatia
- Vlach (Ottoman social class)

== Sources ==
- Jevtić, Dragoš; Popović, Dragoljub (2000). Narodna pravna istorija (in Serbian). Savremena administracija. ISBN 9788638706181.
- Šarkić, Srđan (1996). Srednjovekovno srpsko pravo (in Serbian). Matica srpska. ISBN 9788636303696.
