= Voynuks =

- Active: 14th to 16th century
- Allegiance: Ottoman Empire
- Type: Christian auxiliary force
- Role: Infantry

Voynuks (sometimes called voynugans or voynegans) were members of the privileged Ottoman military social class established in the 1370s or the 1380s. Voynuks were tax-exempt non-Muslim, usually Slavic, and also non-Slavic Vlach Ottoman subjects from the Balkans, particularly from the regions of southern Serbia, Macedonia, Thessaly, Bulgaria and Albania and much less in Bosnia and around the Danube–Sava region. Voynuks belonged to the Sanjak of Voynuk which was not a territorial unit like other sanjaks but a separate organisational unit of the Ottoman Empire.

== Establishment ==
The term 'voynuk' is derived from 'voynik' which in South Slavic languages means "soldier." This category of citizens existed in medieval Serbia. They were originally members of the existing Balkan nobility who joined Ottomans in the 14th century and were allowed to retain their estates because Ottomans regularly incorporated pre-Ottoman military groups, including voynuks, in their own system in the early period of the Ottoman expansion in order to accomplish their new conquests more easily. The social class of voynuks was established in the 1370s or 1380s. Southern Serbia, Macedonia, and Bulgaria were main areas of Voynuk groups with some smaller groups in Bosnia and the Danube-Sava area.

== Characteristics ==
Voynuks were tax-exempt non-Muslim citizens who provided military service in periods of war. The only form of taxes they paid was 'maktu', a lump-sum amount charged to the voynuk communities, not per capita. During the periods of peace they lived from agriculture, i.e. farming and cattle breeding. They were allowed to keep their 'baştinas' (inheritable piece of arable land) and were entitled to looting during the war. Voynuks were important part of Ottoman forces until the 16th century when their military importance began to decrease at such extent that they lost their privileged status and became equal to the position of Muslim military classes. Because of the lost privileges many voynuks began to support Venetians or Habsburgs and to join hayduks. At the beginning of the 18th century about one third of young Christian men who lived near Ottoman/Christian borders were members of the groups of outlaws.

Initially, the main task of voynuks was to guard the Ottoman borders in Bulgaria and Macedonia, either by patrolling or by incursions into the enemy territory. Later, Voynuks became auxiliary troops which provided transportation and horses for Ottoman forces during their campaigns. In the 16th century there were around 40,000 voynuks in Bulgaria who were registered as the largest military group in that region. During 16th and 17th century the Ottomans used the term Voynuks as synonym for Bulgarians in the Ottoman documents.

== Ranks ==
The voynuks had their own hierarchy with the following ranks, starting from the highest:

- voynuk sanjak-bey
- voynuk-bey
- çeribaşı
- lagator

Voynuks were organized within Sanjak of the Voynuks (Turkish: Voynugân Sancağı) which was not a territorial administrative unit like other regular sanjaks but one of the Ottoman organizational units of the military and social groups. The largest of such units were those of Voynuks, Akinci, Yürüks, Romani and Vlachs.

== See also ==
- Martolos, Ottoman security forces
