= Martolos =

Internal security force of the Ottoman Empire in the Balkans

The martolos was an internal security force of the Ottoman Empire in the Balkans (Rumelia), mostly active between the 15th to 17th centuries. It initially constituted out of the local mostly Christian populations (Rum Millet), but over time members converted into Islam. For their military service, they were given privileged status (as askeri), in relation to the Rayah. Their commanders were predominantly Muslim.

== Tasks and privileges ==
In the mid-15th century, after the Ottoman conquests, the martolos were used as armed police. They usually worked locally as peace-time border patrols, fortress guards, security for mines, strategic road guards (derbend), and they were occasionally used as soldiers during war, or tax collectors. They were somewhat similar to another Ottoman organization, the Voynuks, recruited in South Slavic territories, initially tasked with the defense and security, then later used as auxiliary transportation units.

Due to their positions, they were allowed and able to hold timars. They received a daily wage, and askeri status, despite still being Christian. Their commanders were predominantly Muslim (martolos bashi). The duty was hereditary. They were exempted from the jizya and various local taxes.

== History ==
The martolos system was adopted from the Byzantine Empire. Predominantly recruited from the Balkans, they were chosen from the land-owning Orthodox Christians, who retaining their religion, entered the askeri caste. The Cuman-Kipchak tribes, who fled to the Balkans from the Mongols in 1241, were settled in Bithynia and border regions such as Phrygia and Paphlagonia by the Nicaea Empire. It is also claimed that when the Ottoman Empire's settled to the region, they played an important role in the capture of Bithynia by the Ottoman Empire's by helping their relatives. One of the inferences is that in this period, especially in the region called Bithynia, in the light of the Ottoman foundation sources, some of the Cuman-Kipchaks were included in the Martolos Organization. It is also known that these Turks, mentioned among the Ottoman Empire's who approached religious issues with tolerance, lived in their own settlements while preserving their customs and culture.

The martolos were used as armed police in the mid-15th century, and in the following two centuries had various security tasks (see previous section). To northwestern Bosnia and parts of Croatia (sanjak of Klis and Lika) Ottomans settled Serbs and Vlachs which were incorporated into hereditary Christian groups of martolos and voynuks. In Ottoman Hungary and Buda area Serbs in great numbers served as martolos, which were Christian origin members largely recruited from the Vlach and Vlach like population. It initially constituted out of the local mostly Christian populations (Rum Millet), but over time members converted into Islam. In the 17th century, following the increase of local Christian antagonism in the Balkans, the martolos that were put against the hajduks (rebels) created hostility, with some martolos joining the rebels. Due to this, the Porte had abolished the right to Balkan Christians to serve as martolos in 1692. By 1722, the Rumelian beylerbey Osman Pasha merged the organization into the Muslim pandor (local security police). A few martolos persisted in northern Macedonia until the 19th century, then replaced by the Tanzimat reforms.

== Terminology ==
The Turkish: martolos, is derived from Greek: armatolos, meaning "armed man, militiaman". Being the original word for Christians in the Ottoman army, martolos became a general word for various Christian military groups and individuals, being used by the Ottomans for Christian spies, pathfinders, messengers, Danube boatsmen, and fortress guards, as well as for the Christian rebels fighting the akinci. During Suleiman's reign (1520–66), the term was also used for local Christian police forces, especially in brigandage-infested regions of Montenegro and Morea.

== Sources ==
- Vasić, Milan (1967). Мартолоси у југословенским земљама под турском влашћу. Sarajevo.
- Vasić, Milan (1963). "Martolosi u periodu uspona osmanske države". Godišnjak Društva istoričara BiH. XIV. Sarajevo: 11–65.
- Agoston, Gabor; Masters, Bruce Alan (2009). Encyclopedia of the Ottoman Empire. Infobase Publishing. p. 353. ISBN 978-1-4381-1025-7.
- Uyar, Mesut; Erickson, Edward J. (2009). A Military History of the Ottomans: From Osman to Atatürk. ABC-CLIO. pp. 63–64. ISBN 978-0-275-98876-0.
- Bosworth, Clifford Edmund (1989). The Encyclopedia of Islam, Volume 6, Fascicules 107-108. Brill Archive. p. 613. ISBN 90-04-09082-7.
