= Bogumil Hrabak =

Serbian historian

- Богумил Храбак
- Born: 11 January 1927; Veliki Bečkerek, Belgrade Oblast, Kingdom of Serbs, Croats and Slovenes
- Died: 12 December 2010 (aged 83); Belgrade, Serbia
- Occupation: Historian

Bogumil Hrabak (Serbian Cyrillic: Богумил Храбак; 11 January 1927 – 12 December 2010) was a Yugoslav and Serbian historian, university professor and pedagogue. With a prolific and versatile career, he was considered "one of the last polyhistors of Yugoslav historiography."

He studied history from 1946 to 1951 at the University of Belgrade and later in Sarajevo, where he received his doctorate in 1957. He worked in Belgrade at the Faculty of Philosophy (1951-1957), the Military History Institute until 1958 and the Institute of Social Sciences until 1965, then at the Faculty of Philosophy in Priština, where he founded the Department of History, and from 1979 until his retirement in 1993 at the Faculty of Philosophy in Novi Sad. He was a full member of the Academy of Sciences and Arts of Kosovo (1978-1990). He was a historian of wide interests, who also dealt with various aspects of Serbo-Croatian history, especially foreign trade and diplomacy of the Republic of Dubrovnik.

== Works ==
- "Hercegovački dukatnici" [Herzegovinian ducat makers] (PDF). Istorijski Zapisi (in Serbian). 8 (1–2): 165–188. 1957.
- Izvoz žitarica iz Osmanlijskog Carstva u XIV, XV i XVI stoleću: udeo Dubrovčana u prometu turskim žitom [Export of grain from the Ottoman Empire in the 14th, 15th, and 16th centuries: the role of the people of Dubrovnik in the trade of Turkish Grain] (in Serbian). Priština: Zajednica naučnih ustanova Kosova. 1971.
- Yugoslav prisoners in Italy and their volunteer question 1915–1918 (1980)
- Wallachian and Uskok movements in northern Dalmatia in the 16th century (I – II, 1988) )
- Entente Powers and the United States of America towards Bulgaria 1915–1918 (1990)
- Nikšić do početka XIX veka [Nikšić until the beginning of the 19th century] (in Serbian). Belgrade: self-published. 1997.
- Prizren-Arbanasi League 1878–1881 (1998)
- Podgorica until the beginning of the 19th century (2000)
- Džemijet: organizacija muslimana Makedonije, Kosova, Metohije i Sandžaka, 1919–1928 [Džemijet: organization of the Muslims of Macedonia, Kosovo, Metohija and Sandžak 1919–1928] (in Serbian). Belgrade: self-published. 2003.
- Iz starije prošlosti Bosne i Hercegovine [From the older past of Bosnia and Herzegovina] (in Serbian). Vol. I. Belgrade: self-published. 2003.
- Iz starije prošlosti Bosne i Hercegovine [From the older past of Bosnia and Herzegovina] (in Serbian). Vol. II. Belgrade: Arhivar. 2003.
- Iz starije prošlosti Bosne i Hercegovine [From the older past of Bosnia and Herzegovina] (in Serbian). Vol. III. Belgrade: Arhivar. 2004.
- Jevreji u Beogradu : do sticanja ravnopravnosti (1878) [Jews in Belgrade: to achieve equality (1878)] (in Serbian). Belgrade: Srpski genealoški centar. 2009. ISBN 9788683679522.
