= Petar I Pavlović =

15th century Bosnian nobleman

Gospodin Petar Pavlović
- Grand Duke of Bosnia
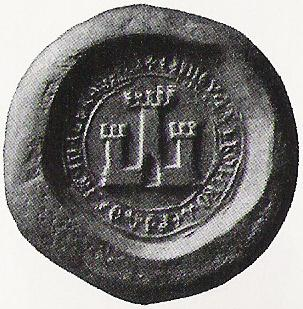
- Seal of Petar and Radosav Pavlović

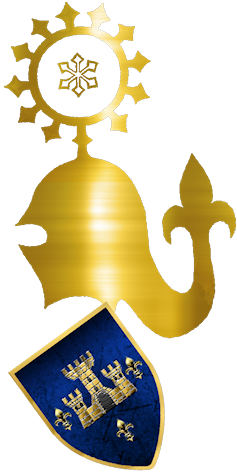
- Coat of arms
- feudal lord, highest military office: 1415-1420
- Predecessor: Pavle Radinović
- Successor: Radosav Pavlović
- Full name: Petar I Pavlović
- Native name: Petar
- Known for: witness to his father's murder at the hand of Grand Duke of Bosnia, Sandalj
- Years active: 1415-death
- Born: unknown Borač Castle
- Died: 1420 eastern Bosnia
- Cause of death: killed in action
- Buried: probably in Lukavica, south of present-day Sarajevo
- Residence: Borač Castle
- Locality: Prača
- Family: Pavlović
- Father: Pavle Radinović

Petar I Pavlović (Serbian Cyrillic: Петар I Павловић; died 1420) was a knez, and then a Grand Duke of Bosnia, from the noble family of Pavlović, which had its possessions in the eastern parts of the Kingdom of Bosnia. After the murder of his father Pavle Radinović (died 1415) on Parena Poljana near royal court in Sutjeska and below a Bobovac in 1415, after the stanak at which whole Pavlović family was present at, Petar took over the leadership of the Pavlovići and with his younger brother Knez Radosav (1420–1441) started a war against Sandalj Hranić (1392–1435) and Kosača klan. In that conflict, he relied on the help of the Ottomans, whose help he paid for by recognizing vassal relations to the sultan, which also resulted in successful campaigns against Sandalj, who was completely suppressed. However, the Ottomans changed sides and arrived in the Kingdom of Bosnia in 1420 as Sandalj's allies against Pavlović. In the conflict with them, Petar himself was killed, and his younger brother Radosav succeeds him as the leader of Pavlović and the Grand Duke of Bosnia.

== Origin and family ==
Petar I Pavlović was the eldest son of Knez Pavle Radinović, who besides him had another son, Knez Radosav, who will become Grand Duke of Bosnia (1420–1441). It is not known whether Petar was married, but it is certain that he had no children, since he was succeeded by his brother Radosav and his sons.

== Reign and conflict with Sandalj ==
=== Murder of Pavlović's patriarch ===
During August 1415, a stanak was convened, with the king and all highest nobility of the Kingdom of Bosnia being present. The stanak was held in Kraljeva Sutjeska near Royal court and not far from king's favorite royal residence on Bobovac. During a morning walk on August 24 on Parena poljana, the members of Zlatonosović's, at a signal given by Grand Duke of Bosnia, Sandalj Hranić himself, attacked Knez Pavle Radinović with a sword and seriously wounded him. They also captured his son Petar and the family's protovestiarios Brailo Tezalović and took them to the fortified Bobovac. The conspiracy was organized by King Ostoja himself (first government 1398–1404, second government 1409–1418) and duke Sandalj due to political conflicts with Pavle, accusing him of betraying the kingdom. According to the original plan, Pavle's son Petar was supposed to be blinded, and Pavlović's possessions were supposed to be divided between Sandalj and Zlatonosovićs, who were hoping for Olovo region rich in all kinds of ore, which was bordering their feudal possessions, but that plan was abandoned, and Petar was left with his father's possessions. The whole act was attended by the representative of the Republic of Dubrovnik Nikola Gučetić and Vlatko Tumurlić. Pavle himself soon died from the effects of the wounds he received, but Petar was therefore released to return to the family estate and continue managing it. As a witness to this attack, Petar directly blamed Sandalj for the death of his father, which pushed the entire south-eastern part of today's Bosnia and Herzegovina into a war between Pavlović on one side and Hranić clan, on the other.

=== Igniting the conflict ===
Petar asked the Ottomans for help in this conflict, promising them vassalage in return, which they accepted, and already in the fall of 1415, their detachments invaded Hum led by the brothers Đurađ and Stjepan of Bosnian Vlach tribe of Miloradović. With the help of the Ottomans, until 1417, Petar controlled the entire Konavle, which until then was divided between Pavlović and Kosača. In order to establish his property on the coast, he contracted with the people of Dubrovnik to build a water tank in the Sokol Fortress, which was the most important fortress in Konavle.

Pavlović's pressure on Sandalj and those who supported him was so great that the King Ostoja himself had to secretly escape at night from stanak, the meeting of the Kingdom's nobility, in order not to suffer the same fate he had organized for Pavle Radinović a few years earlier. The consequence of this and Sandalje's seemingly hopeless situation was Ostoja's decision to approach Pavlović and be one of those who would take advantage of Kosača's downfall, but without much of success because he had already died in 1418. His son and successor Stjepan Ostojić (1418–1421) continued his hostile policy towards Sandalj, but also without visible success. However, the conflict itself partially subsided because the son of Sandalj's second wife, Jelena, from his first marriage, Balša III Balšić (1403–1421), came to his aid, and Sandalj also realized that the only force that brings superiority in conflicts is the power of the Ottomans, so he also became their vassal, most likely in the middle of 1418, since in the fall of the same year he is mentioned by them as the undoubted lord of his lands.

The decisive event in this phase of the conflict between Sandalj and Petar was probably Hranić's decision to sell his part of Konavlje to the Republic of Ragusa. On June 27, 1419, he sold his share for 30,000 perper, while Peter refused to sell his share to the Republic. Most likely, with the help of these funds, Sandalj managed to mobilize the Ottomans, and at the beginning of 1420, they invaded the Kingdom of Bosnia again, but this time their attacks were directed against Pavlović. During those battles at the end of March of the same year, Petar himself was killed in a conflict with them, and the leadership of the Pavlović and the ducal title was taken over by his younger brother Knez Radosav.

=== Consequences ===
The biggest consequence of this fierce conflict, which seemed to be able to end only with the complete destruction of one or the other, was the direct involvement of the Ottomans in internal matters of the Kingdom, first on the side of Pavlović, and then on Sandalj's side. Although Ottomans worked exclusively for their own interest, they gradually imposed themselves on every important aspect of political, economic and military life, weaking the Kingdom Bosnia in the process. The conflict between Pavlović and Kosača itself subsided over time, while both families practically disappeared during the Ottoman conquest of Bosnia and Herzegovina, which was a prolonged process stretching over 50 years, between 1463 and 1528.

== See also ==
- Hrvatinić

== Bibliography ==
- ANURS (2003). Zemlja Pavlovića: srednji vijek i period turske vladavine (in Serbian). Istočno Sarajevo—Banja Luka: Akademija nauka i umjetnosti Republike Srpske. ISBN 978-99938-631-1-3.
- Исаиловић, Невен (2017). "Прилог о деловању кнеза и војводе Петра Павловића у босанско-угарско-турским сукобима почетком XV века" (PDF). Историјски часопис. 66: 145–163. Archived from the original (PDF) on 21 July 2018.
- Ćirković, Sima (1964a). Herceg Stefan Vukčić-Kosača i njegovo doba [Herceg Stefan Vukčić-Kosača and his time] (in Serbian). Naučno delo SANU.
- Ćirković, Sima (1964). Историја средњовековне босанске државе [History of the medieval Bosnian state] (in Serbian). Srpska književna zadruga.
- Ćorović, Vladimir (1940). Хисторија Босне [History of Bosnia] (in Serbian) (Посебна изданја - Друштбени и историски списи - Књига 53 ed.). Belgrade: Српска краљевска академија – Штамиарија "Слово" (Глас српски – reprint 1999). ISBN 978-86-7119-161-6.
- Ćorović, Vladimir (1997). Istorija srpskog naroda [History of the Serb people] (in Serbian) (Book 1 ed.). Belgrade: eBook Portal.
- Ćošković, Pejo (2009a), Kosača: Intro (in Serbo-Croatian), Miroslav Krleža Institute of Lexicography
- Kurtović, Esad (2009a), Kosača: Sandalj Hranić (in Serbo-Croatian), Miroslav Krleža Institute of Lexicography
- Ćošković, Pejo (2009), Kotromanići (in Serbo-Croatian), Miroslav Krleža Institute of Lexicography
- Fine, John Van Antwerp Jr. (1994) [1987]. The Late Medieval Balkans: A Critical Survey from the Late Twelfth Century to the Ottoman Conquest. Ann Arbor, Michigan: University of Michigan Press. ISBN 978-0-472-08260-5.
- Kurtović, Esad (2010). "Sandalj Hranić Kosača – Biography of the Bosnian Magnate". Bosna Franciscana (in Bosnian) (33). CEEOL. ISSN 1330-7487.
- Kurtović, Esad (2009). Sandalj Hranić Kosača – Biografija bosanskog vlastelina [Sandalj Hranić Kosača – Biography of a Bosnian nobleman]. Historijske monografije (in Bosnian). Vol. 4. Sarajevo: Institut za istoriju. ISBN 978-9958-649-01-1 – via academia.edu.
- Kurtović, Esad (2009b), Hranić (in Serbo-Croatian), Miroslav Krleža Institute of Lexicography
- Nakaš, Lejla (2011), Konkordancijski rječnik ćirilskih povelja srednjovjekovne Bosne [Concordance Dictionary of Cyrillic Charters of Medieval Bosnia] (in Bosnian) (Posebna izdanja, knjiga X, svezak 1 ed.), Društvo za proučavanje srednjovjekovne bosanske historije
- Vego, Marko (1982). Postanak srednjovjekovne bosanske države [The becoming of the medieval Bosnian state] (in Serbo-Croatian). Sarajevo: Svjetlost.

Preceded by Pavle Radinović	Pavlovići; 1415–1420.	Succeeded by Radosav Pavlović
