= Dragiša Dinjčić =

15th-century Bosnian nobleman

Gospodin Dragiša Dinjčić
- Knez
- Reign: 15th c.
- Predecessor: Dinjica
- Noble family: Dinjčić noble family
- Issue: Pokrajec
- Father: Dinjica

Dragiša Dinjičić (Serbian Cyrillic: Драгиша Дињичић) was a knez from the Bosnian noble Dinjičić family, which had its estates in the eastern parts of the medieval Bosnian state, in the Jadar region. He was the son of the Župan Dinjica.

Dinjica is succeeded by Knez Dragiša Dinjčić, probably his son. Dragiša Dinjčić is known for his active participation in the conspiracy against Knez Pavle Radinović and his murder in walk through Parena Poljana valley, between royal court in Sutjeska and royal fortress-town Bobovac, on 22 August 1415. After this event, open hostility arose among the Bosnian nobility. As such a situation did not suit Sultan Mehmed I, he initiated a new session of stanak through his representatives. During the stanak, the King Ostoja was blamed for this event, as well as Dinjčićs, whose arrest was ordered. Like King Ostoja, Dragiša escaped arrest, and as a man of King Tvrtko II, he often appears in his charters among the first witnesses.

Knez Dragiša had two brothers, Pavle Dinjčić and Kovač Dinjčić, and a son, Pokrajec, who is mentioned in a Dubrovnik charter from 1426.

== See also ==
- Sandalj

== Bibliography ==
- Spasić, Dušan; Palavestra, Aleksandar; Mrđenović, Dušan (1991). Rodoslovne Tablice I Grbovi Srpskih Dinastija I Vlastele [Genealogical plates and coats of arms of Serbian dynasties and rulers]. Beograd. pp. 77, 78. ISBN 978-86-7685-007-5.
- Rudić, Srđan (2006). Властела Илирског грбовника. Београд: Историјски институт САНУ. ISBN 9788677430559.
- Filipović, Emir O. (2019). Bosansko kraljevstvo i Osmansko carstvo: (1386-1463) (in Bosnian). Orijentalni institut Univerziteta u Sarajevu. ISBN 978-9958-626-47-0.
