= List of Bosnian dukes =

This is a list of Bosnian dukes. It contains individuals who bore the title duke, or as called locally vojvoda. The list include individuals who at one time bore the title knez, also court titles, vlasteličić, and other minor titles of the Medieval Bosnia.

== Duke ==
Picture	^{Title}Name	House	Reign	Overlordship	Ruling title
Nominal
	^{Duke of Bosnia} Béla of Macsó	Rurik dynasty	fl. 1262–1266		
	^{Duke of Bosnia} Michael of Bosnia	Rurik dynasty	fl. 1266/1271-1272		
	^{Duke}Petar Kovačević	Kovačević-Dinjčić	fl. 15th c.		

== Knez ==
Picture	^{Title}Name	House	Reign	Overlordship	Notes
	^{Knez} Pavle Radinović	Pavlović noble family	fl. ?–1415	Tvrtko I (1377–1391); Dabiša (1391–1395); Jelena Gruba (1395–1398); Ostoja (1398–1404); Tvrtko II (1404–1409); Ostoja (1409–1418) Bosnia	
	^{Knez} Dragiša Dinjčić	Dinjčić noble family	15th c.	Ostoja (1398–1404); Tvrtko II (1404–1409); Ostoja (1409–1418) Bosnia	
	^{Knez} Radič Sanković	Sanković noble family	fl. ?–1404	Dabiša (1391–1395); Jelena Gruba (1395–1398); Ostoja (1398–1404) Bosnia	

== Others ==
Minor titles

== See also ==
- List of grand dukes of Bosnia
- List of rulers of Bosnia
- List of Bosnian consorts
- List of noble families of medieval Bosnia
