= Vukmir Zlatonosović =

15th century Bosnian nobleman

Vukmir Zlatonosović (Serbian Cyrillic: Вукмир Златоносовић; died 1424) was a duke from the noble Zlatonosović family that ruled the area of Usora in the Kingdom of Bosnia.

He was a participant in the conspiracy against Knez Pavle Radinović, hatched by Sandalj Hranić and King Stjepan Ostoja, which resulted in Pavle's assassination at Parena Poljana near royal court in Sutjeska in 1415. According to the conspiratorial plan, the town of Olovo should have been handed over to Vukmir, but that did not happen.

He fell ill in 1424. Thus, at the beginning of the aforementioned year, Sandalj Hranić asked for help from the people of Dubrovnik to send a doctor to Vukmir. The request was repeated once again in October, and the people of Dubrovnik took on the expenses of two hundred perper, which was necessary for the treatment. Since then, Vukmir is not mentioned in the records, and it is considered that he died in the same year. He was succeeded by his brother Vukašin at the family's helm.

== See also ==
- Dinjčić noble family

== Bibliography ==
- Душан Спасић; Александар Палавестра; Душан Мрђеновић (1991). Родословне таблице и грбови српских династија и властеле. Београд. ISBN 978-86-7685-007-5.
- Sulejmanagić, Amer (2012). "The Coat of Arms of the Pavlović Family". Bosna Franciscana. 36: 165–206.
- Filipović, Emir O. (2019). Bosansko kraljevstvo i Osmansko carstvo: (1386-1463) (in Bosnian). Orijentalni institut Univerziteta u Sarajevu. ISBN 978-9958-626-47-0.
- Ćorović, Vladimir (2001), Istorija srpskog naroda (in Serbian) (Internet ed.), Belgrade: Ars Libri
- Fine, John Van Antwerp (December 1975), The Bosnian Church: a new interpretation: a study of the Bosnian Church and its place in state and society from the 13th to the 15th centuries, East European quarterly, ISBN 978-0-914710-03-5
- Fine, John Van Antwerp (1994), The Late Medieval Balkans: A Critical Survey from the Late Twelfth Century to the Ottoman Conquest, Ann Arbor: University of Michigan Press, ISBN 978-0-472-08260-5
- Renner, Heinrich (1897), Durch Bosnien und die Herzegovina kreuz und quer (in German), Berlin D. Reimer (E. Vohsen)
- Vego, Marko (1957), Naselja bosanske srednjevjekovne države (in Bosnian), Sarajevo: Svjetlost
- Kurtović, Esad (2009), Veliki vojvoda bosanski Sandalj Hranić Kosača (PDF) (in Bosnian), Sarajevo: Institut za istoriju univerzitet Sarajevo, archived from the original (PDF) on 2018-07-14
- Živković, Pavo (1981). Tvrtko II Tvrtković: Bosna u prvoj polovini xv stoljeća (in Serbo-Croatian). Sarajevo: Institut za istoriju. ISBN 0-472-08260-4.
