= Sandalj Hranić =

Bosnian nobleman (1370–1435)

Gospodin Sandalj Hranić
- Grand Duke of Bosnia
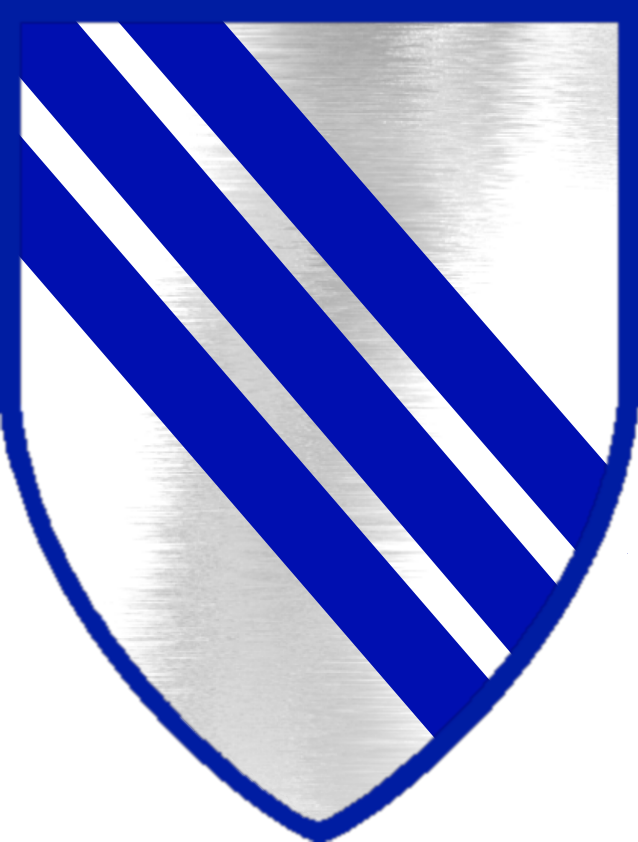
- Coat of arms: _{Sandalj's proto-heraldic escutcheon from marriage to Katarina Vuković Hrvatinić.}
- Reign: 1392–1435
- Predecessor: Vlatko Vuković (uncle)
- Successor: Stjepan Vukčić Kosača (nephew)
- Born: 1370
- Died: 15 March 1435 (aged 64–65)
- Noble family: Kosača noble family
- Spouses: Jelena Lazarević, widow of Đurađ II Balšić; Katarina, niece of Hrvoje Vukčić Hrvatinić* Jelena Balšić
- Father: Hrana Vuković

Sandalj Hranić Kosača (Serbian Cyrillic: Сандаљ Хранић Косача; 1370 – 15 March 1435) was a powerful Bosnian nobleman whose primary possessions consisted of Hum, land areas between Adriatic coast, the Neretva and the Drina rivers in Bosnia, and served the court as the Grand Duke of Bosnia sometime between 1392 and his death in 1435, although the first mention as a Grand Duke in sources comes from 16 June 1404. He was married three times, but had no children. After his death, he was succeeded by his nephew Stjepan Vukčić Kosača.

His father was Hrana Vuković.

== Rise of Sandalj ==
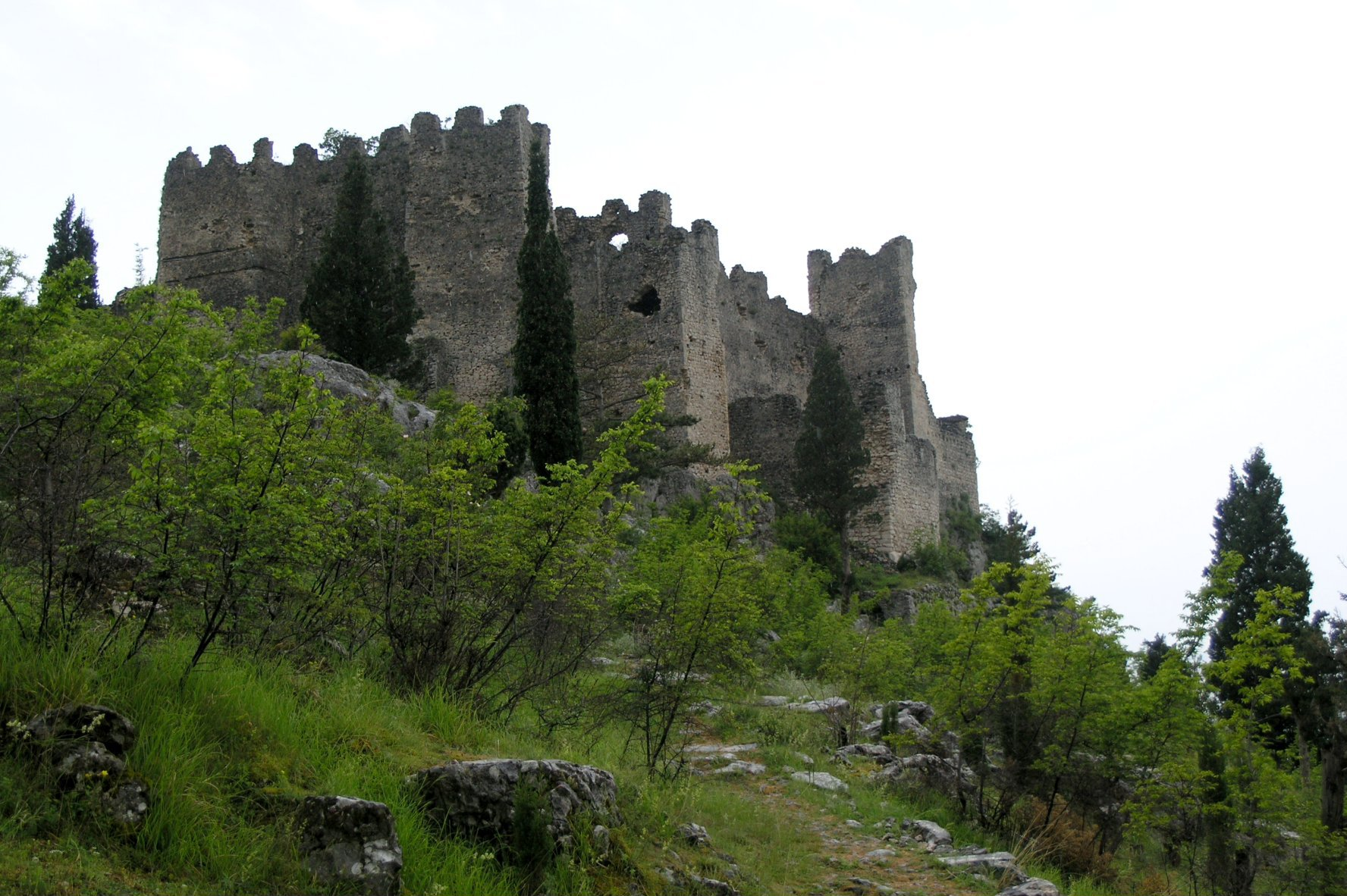
Blagaj Fort, Sandalj's residence.

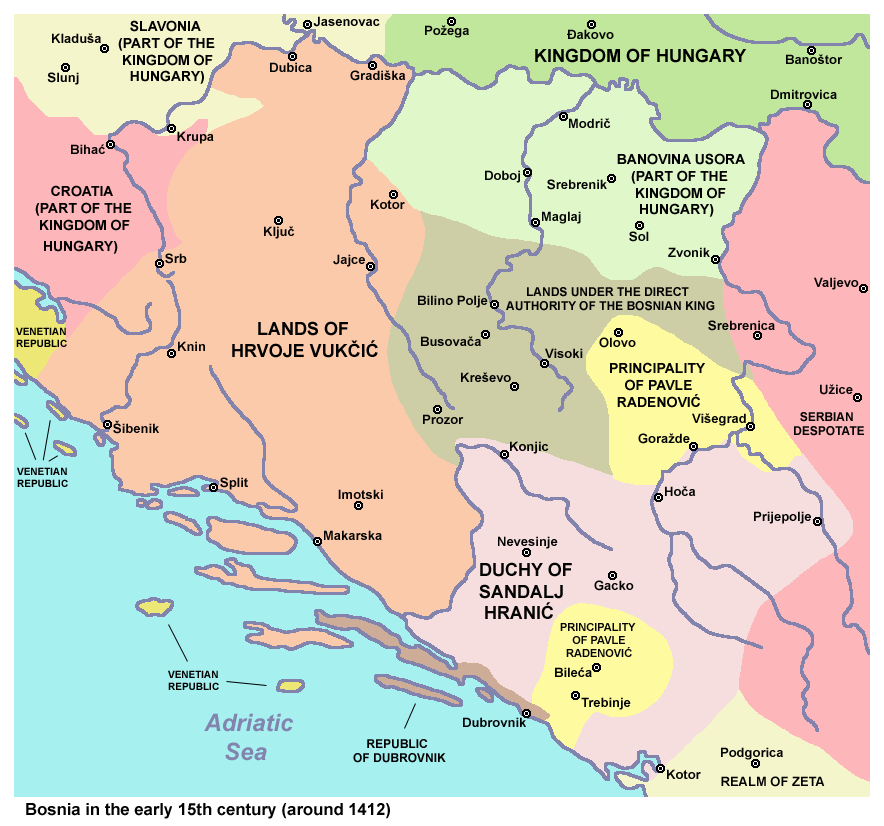
Sandalj's duchy of in the early 15th century.

As the head of the House of Kosača, Sandalj Hranić succeeded his uncle Vlatko Vuković in 1392.

In 1403, Radič Sanković led the attacks on Dubrovnik during the Bosnian-Ragusan War in the name of King Stephen Ostoja. Sandalj Hranić captured and blinded Radič, and held him in prison until his death in 1404. When King Ladislaus of Naples sold his rights to the kingdom of Dalmatia to the Republic of Venice and retreated from the Balkans in 1409, many local nobles allied themselves with Holy Roman Emperor Sigismund and accepted Stephen Ostoja as King of Bosnia. This seriously weakened the position of Hrvoje Vukčić Hrvatinić, whose niece Katarina was Sandalj's second wife. In such circumstances Sandalj also allied with Emperor Sigismund in mid 1411 and decided to establish closer connections with Sigismund's important ally Stefan Lazarević by marrying his widowed sister Jelena. Sandalj divorced Katarina in 1411 and married Jelena in December of the same year.

=== Marriages and foreign policy ===
This marriage had its important political consequences because Hranić, the most dangerous enemy of Balša III, became his stepfather and protector. With this marriage Hranić spoiled the relations with Hrvoje but developed closer relations with Lazarević family. Jelena went to live with her husband in Bosnia, and although she was in her forties, Sandalj left a deposit in Dubrovnik, in May 1413, for children he hoped they would have, while Balša was entrusted with governing of Zeta.

=== Assassination of Pavle and most powerful nobleman ===
He took part in a conspiracy to kill Pavle Radinović in 1415, and the assassination must have been hatched in the background of the stanak, held in Sutjeska in August 1415 and attended by all the major noblemen except for Hrvoje Vukčić.

At the end of the month, in the morning of August 24, 1415, King Ostoja and his son left Sutjeska on a horseback. With them on their departure were Knez Pavle and his son Petar, Duke Sandalj Hranić, Duke Pavle Klešić, Duke Vukmir of Zlatonosović's, Župan Dragiša of Dinjčić's and Sandalj's brother, Knez Vuk Hranić. They departed together in the procession that moved from the royal court in Sutjeska towards Bobovac Fortress along the Bukovica river.

During a walk, at the location called Parena Poljana, somewhere in the canyon of Bukovica between the royal court and the city-fortress Bobovac, a brawl erupted and Sandalj drew his sword which was a cue to King Ostoja, who jumped on Pavle's son Petar and bound him, and Vukmir Zlatonosović, who immediately attacked Pavle who tried to escape but was caught by Sandalj's men, led by his brother, Vuk Hranić, and decapitated on site. Pavle succeeded in wounding Vukmir above the right shoulder but caught by a surprise and outnumbered he was unable to defend himself more effectively. It seems as if Pavle walked into a Sandalj's trap oblivious of his alleged misdeeds.

Four men died that day and several people from Pavle's entourage were captured along with his son Petar. Vuk Hranić tied up Pavle's protovestijar, Brailo Tezalović, while a merchant from Prača, Pribislav Muržić, was captured by other Sandalj's men. Of Pavle's retainers only krstjanin Vlatko Tumurlić escaped by seeking shelter in a Franciscan home, and later took Pavle's corpse to his estate in Vrhbosna, where he was buried at the location called Pavlovac near present day Kasindo, few kilometers south of Sarajevo. Petar was at first brought to Bobovac, and was supposed to be blinded, but for some reason this did not happen. Pavle's lands were promptly divided between the conspirators, but Petar and his brother Knez Radosav Pavlović will successfully repel all attempts of takeover from happening.

Duke Sandalj justified the murder to an astonished witness, a Ragusan ambasador Ivan Đivo Gundulić, who had written account of this whole affair, by accusing Pavle of bringing much misfortune to the Bosnian kingdom, saying:

"Did you expect to see this? This is how we, by the grace of God, do justice just like your lordship in Dubrovnik, because in Dubrovnik the punishment for treason is beheading, so I do the same with other faithful Bosnians." — excerpt from Ivan Gundulić's letter written to his superiors in Dubrovnik

Afterwards, Hranić's came into conflict with Pavlović family. In fighting against them, he allied with Ottoman Empire. In 1420 Ishak Bey organized unsuccessful campaign in Bosnia to support Sandalj's struggle against his internal enemies.

At the beginning of February 1426, a special ceremony was dedicated to Duke Sandalj and Duchess Jelena in Dubrovnik, when they attended the feast of Saint Blaise, the city's patron saint. Sandalj often had conflicts with King Stephen Tvrtko II, even refusing to attend his wedding to the Hungarian-born Dorothy Garai in 1428.

== Death and legacy ==
From 1419 Sandalj became the most powerful man in the Kingdom of Bosnia and remained so to his death. Sandalj died childless in 1435. He was succeeded by his nephew Stjepan Vukčić Kosača, son of his brother Vukac.

Fine believes that Sandalj was most likely the person who killed Musa Çelebi, who was inspiration for epic hero Musa Kesedžija, or contributed significantly to his murder, and should have been the epic hero attributed with fighting and killing Musa, rather than Marko Kraljević.

Ragusan historian Junije Restić (1669—1735), compiled brief obituary for Sandalj, based on local archived records:

"He was a prince with lively spirit, with great intelligence and with much delicacy, who was always able to penetrate the heart of the matter with great facility, whose memory would have been immortal, if his life had not been stained and his fame obscured with the error of schism and the Patarin [Bosnian Church] rite in which he was born and in which he died." — Junije Restić

== Religion ==
Sandalj was a staunch supporter of the Bosnian Church, which he openly followed, and used every opportunity to instill its influence in all spheres of life in the kingdom. This is confirmed by Giunio Resti (Junije Restić), known as Restius, who in his chronicle points out that Sandalj was born and died in the bosom of the Bosnian Church. Accordingly, in letters from April and May 1405, Ragusans tied him to the top brass of the Bosnian Church. The presence of djed, highest ranking priest of the Bosnian Church, always close to Sandalj during the Konavle War also confirms duke's conviction in role of the Bosnian Church and its place in political and public life in medieval Bosnia. Like his contemporaries, Hrvoje Vukčić, Pavle Radinović and his son Radislav Pavlović, Sandalj was closely linked to the philosophy and "moral politology" of his time, represented by the shadowy patarens, or Kristjani as the members of the Bosnian Church called themselves, and whose organized structure was deeply interwoven with all aspects of human everyday life, protecting the rights, morals and elements of the state-building in its time.

== Sources ==
- Ćirković, Sima (1964a). Herceg Stefan Vukčić-Kosača i njegovo doba [Herceg Stefan Vukčić-Kosača and his time] (in Serbian). Naučno delo SANU.
- Ćirković, Sima (1964). Историја средњовековне босанске државе [History of the medieval Bosnian state] (in Serbian). Srpska književna zadruga.
- Ćorović, Vladimir (1940). Хисторија Босне [History of Bosnia] (in Serbian) (Посебна изданја - Друштбени и историски списи - Књига 53 ed.). Belgrade: Српска краљевска академија – Штамиарија "Слово" (Глас српски – reprint 1999). ISBN 978-86-7119-161-6.
- Ćošković, Pejo (2009a), Kosača (in Serbo-Croatian), Miroslav Krleža Institute of Lexicography
- Ćošković, Pejo (2009), Kotromanići (in Serbo-Croatian), Miroslav Krleža Institute of Lexicography
- Ćošković, Pejo (2005), Crkva Bosanska u xv. stoljeću [Bosnian Church in the 15th century] (in Serbo-Croatian), vol. Book 2 of Historijske monografije, Sarajevo: Institut za Istoriju, ISBN 9789958964268
- Filipović, Emir O. (2019). Bosansko kraljevstvo i Osmansko carstvo: (1386-1463) (in Bosnian). Orijentalni institut Univerziteta u Sarajevu. ISBN 978-9958-626-47-0.
- Esad Kurtović (2009). Veliki vojvoda bosanski Sandalj Hranić Kosača (PDF) (in Bosnian) (Historijske monografije - Knjiga 4 ed.). Sarajevo: Institut za istoriju. ISBN 978-9958-649-01-1. Archived from the original (PDF) on 14 July 2018. "COBISS.BH-ID 17413382"
- Kurtović, Esad (2010). "Sandalj Hranić Kosača: Biografija bosanskog vlastelina". Bosna Franciscana. 33: 71–78.
- Fine, John Van Antwerp (1975). The Bosnian Church: a new interpretation: a study of the Bosnian Church and its place in state and society from the 13th to the 15th centuries. Boulder: East European quarterly. ISBN 978-0-914710-03-5. OCLC 462680616.
- Fine, John Van Antwerp (1994). The Late Medieval Balkans: A Critical Survey from the Late Twelfth Century to the Ottoman Conquest. University of Michigan Press. ISBN 0-472-08260-4.
- Bešić, Zarij M. (1970), Istorija Crne Gore / 2. Crna gora u doba oblasnih gospodara. (in Serbian), Titograd: Redakcija za istoiju Crne Gore, OCLC 175122851
- Veselinović, Andrija; Ljušić, Radoš (2001), Srpske dinastije (in Serbian), Belgrade, Novi Sad: Platoneum, ISBN 9788683639014, OCLC 50393016
- Spremić, Momčilo (2004), Jovan Ćulibrk (ed.), Crkvene prilike u Zeti u doba Nikona Jerusalimca (in Serbian), Cetinje, Belgrade: Svetigora, Publikum, pp. 73–108, archived from the original on 11 December 2013
- Živković, Pavo (1981). Tvrtko II Tvrtković: Bosna u prvoj polovini xv stoljeća (in Serbo-Croatian). Sarajevo: Institut za istoriju. ISBN 0-472-08260-4.

Military offices
Preceded by Vlatko Vuković	Grand Duke of Bosnia; 1392–1435	Succeeded by Stjepan Vukčić
