= Dinjica =

14th-century Bosnian nobleman

Gospodin Dinjica
- Župan
- Reign: 14th c.
- Successor: Dragiša Dinjčić (son)
- Noble family: Dinjčić noble family
- Issue: Dragiša, Kovač, Vladislav and Pavle.

Dinjica (Serbian Cyrillic: Дињица) was a Bosnian župan and the founder of the Dinjčić noble family, which had its possessions in the eastern parts of the Kingdom of Bosnia, in the Jadar region.

== Background ==
The first preserved written mention of the Župan Dinjica is in the charter of King Tvrtko I Kotromanić, dated 10 April 1378. In the charter, the Bosnian king confirms the earlier charters, and in it he mentions Dinjica. Dinjica had four sons, Dragiša, Kovač Dinjčić, Vladislav Dinjčić and Pavle Dinjčić.

== See also ==
- Zlatonosović

== Bibliography ==
- Spasić, Dušan; Palavestra, Aleksandar; Mrđenović, Dušan (1991). Rodoslovne Tablice I Grbovi Srpskih Dinastija I Vlastele [Genealogical plates and coats of arms of Serbian dynasties and rulers]. Beograd. pp. 77, 78. ISBN 978-86-7685-007-5.
- Rudić, Srđan (2006). Властела Илирског грбовника. Београд: Историјски институт САНУ. ISBN 9788677430559.
