= Sandalj =

Sandalj may refer to:

- Sandalj, Serbia, a village near Valjevo
- Sandalj Hranić, medieval Bosnian nobleman
