= Pavle Radinović =

14th-century Bosnian nobleman

Gospodin Pavle Radinović
- Knez (English: Prince, Lord)
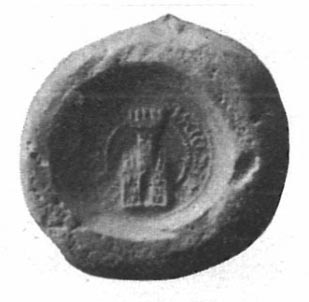
- Seal of Pavle Radinović, 1397

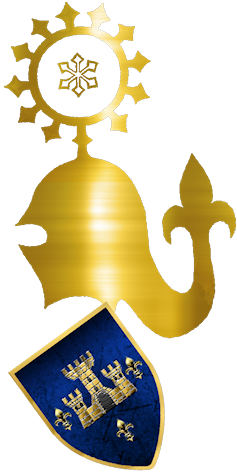
- Coat of arms
- Predecessor: Radin Jablanić
- Successor: Petar Pavlović-Radinović; Radoslav Pavlović Radinović
- Died: 24 August 1415; Parena Poljana near Kraljeva Sutjeska
- Buried: Pavlovac in Vrhbosna, (near present-day Kasindo)
- Noble family: Pavlović
- Father: Radin Jablanić
- Occupation: Nobleman

Pavle Radinović, sometimes Radenović, (Serbian Cyrillic: Павле Радиновић; fl. 1371–d. 1415), was one of the most powerful Bosnian nobleman under Tvrtko I (r. 1377–1391), Dabiša (r. 1391–1395), Jelena Gruba (r. 1395–98), Ostoja (r. 1398–1404), Tvrtko II (r. 1404–1409) and Ostoja again (r. 1409–1418). He was a knez. The head of Radinović-Pavlović noble family, a powerful magnate clan whose initially possessions spread from central to eastern Bosnia, gravitating around the Prača - Miljacka river axis, between the Krivaja Drina and the Upper Bosna rivers, with the seat in Borač and Pavlovac between Prača and Rogatica, and also held mines in Olovo and Fojnica.

Pavle was assassinated near the Royal court in Sutjeska on 24 August 1415, by his compatriots and fellow noblemen, Duke Sandalj Hranić, Duke Vukmir of Zlatonosović's, Župan Dragiša of Dinjčić's, and Knez Vuk Hranić, Sandalj's brother. The circumstances surrounding the assassination were recorded by Ivan Gundulić, Ragusan diplomat at the Bosnian court in Sutjeska, who was present on the scene to witness the entire affair.

== Early life ==
His father was Radin Jablanić (fl. 1380–d. 1387), who had possessions in Krivaja and around the Prača river. The second consort of Stephen Ostoja, Kujava Radinović, could be his close cousin, maybe even sister. He was brought up at the King Tvrtko I's royal court in Sutjeska.

== Service and vassalage ==
=== Tvrtko I's reign ===
His scribe was Radosav Milosalić, mentioned in Pavle's charter from 25 March 1387, during the reign of king Tvrtko I.

=== Dabiša's reign ===
After Tvrtko's death, Pavle greatly expanded his realm, and held besides the hereditary territory around the rivers of Krivaja and Prača, the town of Borač near Vlasenica, the market of Prača, the mine of Olovo.

In 1392, Radič Sanković and his brother Beljak tried to sell Konavle to the Republic of Ragusa. The same year on May 15, Radič issued a charter to Ragusan merchants enabling them to trade in his territories. However, a council meeting was convoked by the king or nobility that objected the sale; Vlatko Vuković and Pavle Radenović were sent against Radič in December 1391 after receiving the council's blessings. The two captured Radič and occupied Konavle, dividing it between themselves, despite protests from Ragusa. The holding of Konavle meant that Pavle held several custom offices towards Ragusa, one of which was shared with Vlatko on Konavljanske Ledenice. Vuković died shortly after this, and was succeeded by his nephew Sandalj Hranić, who continued to struggle against Radič.

When Stephen Dabiša (r. 1391–1395) died in September 1395, he had designated King Sigismund of Hungary, the husband of his cousin, Queen Mary, as his successor. Mary, however, had predeceased Dabiša, dying in May the same year. The Bosnian nobility refused to recognize Sigismund as king, as his right had rested in his status as Mary's husband. Instead, the nobility installed Jelena Gruba, his widow, and a member of the Nikolić family, as the successor to her husband.

=== Jelena Gruba's reign ===
In 1397, his charter secured free trade and protection of Ragusans in his lands, for which he became an honorary citizen of Ragusa. In foreign politics, he, as the other magnates of the Kingdom of Bosnia, supported Ladislaus of Naples in his struggle to wrestle the crown of Hungary from Sigismund of Luxemburg.

He and other magnates such as Hrvoje Vukčić (?-1416) and Sandalj Hranić nominally served Queen Jelena Gruba. They were de facto rulers of the kingdom, especially Pavle, who was the queen's personal advisor.

=== Ostoja's first reign ===
Pavle participated in the decision to crown Ostoja as king in 1398. By the turn of the 14th century, he also held Trebinje, the Vrm župa (county) with the city of Klobuk and half of Konavle with Cavtat.

On April 22, 1404, Ostoja released a charter to the Republic of Venice regarding trade, and at this time Ostoja's court was composed of knez Pavle, vojvoda Vukmir Jurjević, vojvoda Pavle Klešić, vojvoda Radič Sanković, and knez Radoje Radosalić. Of the "magnate triumvirate" that dominated Bosnia, only Pavle remained supporting Ostoja. Hranić captured and blinded Radič, and held him in prison until he died in 1404. The area of Nevesinje to the coast was taken by Hranić. Ostoja was deposed in 1404, and Tvrtko II was crowned the new King of Bosnia.

=== Tvrtko II's reign ===
After the demise of Ladislaus of Naples and his sale of the right to Dalmatia to the Republic of Venice in 1409, many nobles allied themselves with Sigismund and worked to depose Tvrtko II, who had supported Ladislaus, and they managed to return Sigismund's pretender Ostoja to the throne. Hranić also allied himself with Emperor Sigismund in mid-1411 and decided to establish closer connections with Sigismund's important ally Stefan Lazarević by marrying his widowed sister Jelena (who was the mother of Balša III, the ruler of Zeta), divorcing Hrvoje's niece Katarina (December 1411).

Pavle appointed knez Brailo Tezalović his protovestijar sometime in 1411. He was ready to sell his part of Konavle to the Ragusans in 1414, but this was never done.

== Pavle's assassination ==
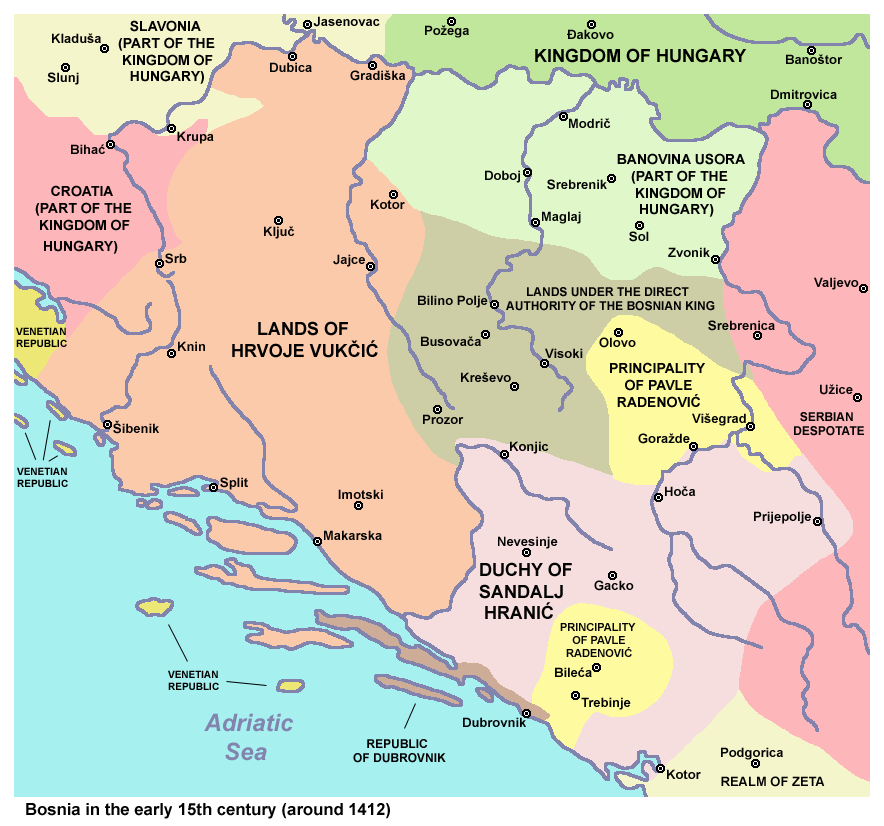
Political map delineating zemlje of Bosnian Kingdom, ca. 1412.

A plot to assassinate Pavle played out during the King Ostoja's 2nd reign, and the best source for the circumstances surrounding the event is a letter written by Ivan Đivo Gundulić, Ragusan ambasador who was in Sutjeska in August 1415, where he attended a meeting of Bosnian noblemen at the stanak.

A conspiracy against Pavle must have been hatched in the background of the stanak, held in Sutjeska in August 1415 and attended by all the major noblemen except for Hrvoje Vukčić.
At the end of the month, in the morning of August 24, 1415, King Ostoja and his son left Sutjeska on horseback. With them on their departure were Knez Pavle and his son Petar, Duke Sandalj Hranić, Duke Pavle Klešić, Duke Vukmir of Zlatonosović's, Župan Dragiša of Dinjčić's and Sandalj's brother, Knez Vuk Hranić. They departed together in the procession that moved from the royal court in Sutjeska towards Bobovac Fortress along the Bukovica river.

Nothing foreshadowed the event that was to follow. During a walk, at the location called Parena Poljana, somewhere in the canyon of Bukovica between the royal court and the city-fortress Bobovac, a brawl erupted when Sandalj suddenly drew his sword, which was a cue to King Ostoja, who jumped on Pavle's son Petar and bound him, and Vukmir Zlatonosović, who immediately attacked Pavle, who tried to escape but was caught by Sandalj's men, led by his brother, Vuk Hranić, and decapitated on site. Pavle succeeded in wounding Vukmir above the right shoulder, but caught by surprise and outnumbered he was unable to defend himself more effectively. It seems as if Pavle walked into Sandalj's trap oblivious of his alleged misdeeds.

Four men died that day and several people from Pavle's entourage were captured along with his son Petar. Vuk Hranić tied up Pavle's protovestijar, Brailo Tezalović, while a merchant from Prača, Pribislav Muržić, was captured by other Sandalj's men.

Of Pavle's retainers only krstjanin Vlatko Tumurlić escaped by seeking shelter in a Franciscan home, and later took Pavle's corpse to his estate in Vrhbosna, where he was buried at the location called Pavlovac near present day Kasindo, few kilometers south of Sarajevo. Petar was at first brought to Bobovac, and was supposed to be blinded, but for some reason this did not happen. Pavle's lands were promptly divided between the conspirators, but Petar and his brother Knez Radosav Pavlović will successfully repel all attempts of takeover from happening.

Duke Sandalj justified the murder to an astonished witness, a Ragusan diplomat Ivan Gundulić, who had written an account of this whole affair, by accusing Pavle of bringing much misfortune to the Bosnian kingdom, saying:

"Did you expect to see this? This is how we, by the grace of God, do justice just like your lordship in Dubrovnik, because in Dubrovnik the punishment for treason is beheading, so I do the same with other faithful Bosnians." — excerpt from Ivan Gundulić's letter written to his superiors in Dubrovnik

=== Politics behind the assassination ===
This move by Sandalj and his men surprised both Knez Pavle and his son because, despite the fact that they too had the entourage of their own, they were relatively easily subdued. Pavle walked into Sandalj's trap, oblivious of his misdeeds, or he believed that nobody was aware of them, or that they were not worthy of such a brutal punishment.

Historiography accounts this brutal political reckoning between the two opposing currents in internal Bosnian affairs, one pro-Hungarian and the other pro-Ottoman, to the fact that Pavle joined forces with Grand Duke of Bosnia, Hrvoje Vukčić, and participated in the overthrow of King Ostoja in favor of King Tvrtko II. Hrvoje was at his peak as a powerbroker around the time of the Battle of Lašva, when he led Bosnian troupes in alliance with Ottoman Turks in thorough defeat of large Hungarian-Croatian army, but whose power seems to be started to diminish already around the time of the assassination. This means that Tvrtko II, who was pro-Ottoman, had the support of Pavlović. However, there were other reasons to account for, such as Pavle's politics toward Konavle which differed from Sandalj's significantly.

== Family ==
- Petar I Pavlović (d. March 1420), duke (vojvoda), fell at battle with Sandalj's Ottoman troops
- Radislav Pavlović (fl. 1420–d. 1441), Grand Duke of Bosnia (since 1441), knyaz (knez) and duke (vojvoda), succeeded by his son Ivaniš (r. 1441–1450)

== Pavle's family land ==
As the head of a powerful magnate clan, the Pavlović's, Pavle commanded possessions which spread from central to eastern Bosnia, gravitating around the Prača - Miljacka river axis, between the Krivaja, Drina and the Upper Bosna rivers. The seat was in Borač, and later Pavlovac fortress, between Prača and Rogatica. He held mines in Olovo and Fojnica.

== Annotations ==
1. Name: His surname is sometimes erroneously spelled Radenović (Serbian Cyrillic: Раденовић), mostly in Serbian historiography. Correct patronymic is Radinović, from his father's name Radin (Jablanić), not erroneous Raden. The same goes for his son Radoslav or Radislav (Pavlović). Different authors use different spelling; in most of cases, authors from Bosnia and Herzegovina and Croatia use the Radin-Radinović-Radislav variant of these names, like, for example, one of the most important Bosnian medievalists, Marko Vego 1957, same in Esad Kurtović 2009's book on pg.23 under reference 60. cited medieval charter with surname spelled Radinović ("Primjera radi, knez Pavle himself mention his father's name, “sinj sveto počivšago gospodina i roditela mi, gospodina kneza Radina Jblanića“ in the charter to the people of Dubrovnik; knez Pavle Radinović naveden je ispravno: “knezj Pavalj Radinović jzj bratiomj”; “Comes Paulus Radinović cum fratribus”, Šurmin, Hrvatski spomenici, 97; Klaić, Povelja, 61."); meanwhile authors from Serbia, like Jovan Radonić, use Raden-Radenović-Radoslav, sometimes even Radosav, variant. Authors from outside Serbo-Croatian speaking sphere use any of these variants indiscriminately, hence Fine 1994 uses Paul (Pavle) Radenović, while, for example, Heinrich Renner 1897, in his "Durch Bosnien und die Herzegovina kreuz und quer" on pg.129, writes Paul Radinović.

== Bibliography ==
- Maslo, Amer (2018). Slavni i velmožni gospodin knez Pavle Radinović [The illustrious and noble Prince Pavle Radinović] (PDF) (in Bosnian). Sarajevo: Univ. u Sarajevu, Filozofski fakultet, Odsjek za historiju.
- Bešić, Zarij M. (1970). Istorija Crne Gore / 2. Crna gora u doba oblasnih gospodara (in Serbian). Titograd: Redakcija za istoiju Crne Gore. OCLC 175122851.
- Ćorović, Vladimir (2001), Istorija srpskog naroda (in Serbian) (Internet ed.), Belgrade: Ars Libri
- Filipović, Emir O. (2019). Bosansko kraljevstvo i Osmansko carstvo: (1386-1463) (in Bosnian). Orijentalni institut Univerziteta u Sarajevu. ISBN 978-9958-626-47-0.
- Fine, John Van Antwerp (December 1975), The Bosnian Church: a new interpretation: a study of the Bosnian Church and its place in state and society from the 13th to the 15th centuries, East European quarterly, ISBN 978-0-914710-03-5
- Fine, John Van Antwerp (1994), The Late Medieval Balkans: A Critical Survey from the Late Twelfth Century to the Ottoman Conquest, Ann Arbor: University of Michigan Press, ISBN 978-0-472-08260-5
- Kurtović, Esad (2009), Veliki vojvoda bosanski Sandalj Hranić Kosača (PDF) (in Bosnian), Sarajevo: Institut za istoriju univerzitet Sarajevo, archived from the original (PDF) on 2018-07-14
- Renner, Heinrich (1897), Durch Bosnien und die Herzegovina kreuz und quer (in German), Berlin D. Reimer (E. Vohsen)
- Стојановић, Љубомир (1929). Старе српске повеље и писма I (in Serbian). Beograd: Српска краљевска академија.
- Sulejmanagić, Amer (2012). "The Coat of Arms of the Pavlović Family". Bosna Franciscana. 36/2012. Aleja Bosne Srebrene 111, Sarajevo, Bosnia and Herzegovina: Franjevačka teologija Sarajevo: 165–206.
- Vego, Marko (1957), Naselja bosanske srednjevjekovne države (in Bosnian), Sarajevo: Svjetlost
- Veselinović, Andrija; Radoš Ljušić (2001), Srpske dinastije (in Serbian), Belgrade, Novi Sad: Platoneum, ISBN 9788683639014, OCLC 50393016
- Živković, Pavo (1981). Tvrtko II Tvrtković: Bosna u prvoj polovini xv stoljeća (in Serbo-Croatian). Sarajevo: Institut za istoriju. ISBN 0-472-08260-4.
