= Vukašin Zlatonosović =

15th century Bosnian nobleman

Vukašin Zlatonosović (Serbian Cyrillic: Вукашин Златоносовић; died 1430) was a duke from the noble Zlatonosović family, which governed the zemlja Usora in the Kingdom of Bosnia.

In primary sources, he is mentioned for the first time in 1399, as a witness in the charter of King Stjepan Ostoja. After the death of his brother Vukmir, he remained the only representative of this house. Although second grade nobility, in his time he was one of the most influential magnates in the Kingdom of Bosnia.

When a conflict broke out between Radoslav Pavlović and the Republic of Dubrovnik in 1430, the Republic asked for help from Tvrtko II, who replied that he had to consult with Duke Vukašin Zlatonosović and Duke Sandalj Hranić. Until June 1430, it was considered that the inclusion of Vukašin in the conflict would be beneficial. In the fall of the same year, Dubrovnik changed its position and considered that the inclusion of Vukašin in the league against Radosav Pavlović would have an unfavorable effect on the people of Dubrovnik, because King Tvrtko II Kotromanić would oppose it.

In mid-November 1430, hostilities broke out between the king and duke Vukašin. The king began his campaign against the Zlatonosović's.

Thus, on November 22, 1430, a letter arrived from Dubrovnik to Sandalj Hranić expressing regret "for the incident that happened to Vukašin Zlatonosović", and about which the people of Dubrovnik were informed through ambassadors and merchants.

Historians of medieval Bosnia believe that the Zlatonosović's were completely annihilated in the conflict with King Tvrtko II in 1430.

== See also ==
- Dinjčić

== Bibliography ==
- Fine, John V. A. (1994). The Late Medieval Balkans: A Critical Survey from the Late Twelfth Century to the Ottoman Conquest. University of Michigan Press. ISBN 978-0-472-08260-5.
- Спасић, Палавестра, Мрђеновић, Душан;Александар;Душан (1991). Родословне таблице и грбови српских династија и властеле. Београд. ISBN 978-86-7685-007-5.
