= Pavao Anđelić =

Bosnian and Yugoslav archaeologist and historian (1920–1985)

- Born: 1920; Sultići, Konjic, Kingdom of Serbs, Croats, and Slovenes
- Died: 1985 (aged 64–65); Sultići, Konjic, SR Bosnia and Herzegovina, SFR Yugoslavia
- Occupations: archaeologist, medievalist
- Known for: discovery and description of the Royal Court of Bosnian medieval rulers, in Kraljeva Sutjeska

Pavao Anđelić (1920–1985) was a Bosnian and Yugoslav lawyer, archaeologist and historian. He mainly studied the history of medieval Bosnia and is noted for archeological work done at Mile and historically rich areal surrounding modern town of Visoko, as well as Kraljeva Sutjeska and Bobovac.

He was born in Sultići, Konjic. Completed Franciscan gymnasium in Visoko and later law in Zagreb, studied history in Sarajevo. He worked in Institute for the Protection of Cultural Monuments in Sarajevo, and was higher custodian in the National Museum of Bosnia and Herzegovina in Sarajevo until his retirement. Achieved doctorate at University of Belgrade Faculty of Philosophy. His archaeological research was concentrated at royal court sites of medieval Bosnia on Bobovac and Kraljeva Sutjeska, and in the area of medieval Visoko. He received "27 July Award" in 1974 from SR BiH for his contributions in archeological works conducted in Bobovac and Kraljeva Sutjeska.

== Books ==
- Bobovac and Kraljeva Sutjeska: Royal seats of Bosnian rulers in 14 and 15 centuries (Bobovac i Kraljeva Sutjeska: stolna mjesta bosanskih vladara u XIV i XV stoljeću)
- Studies about territorial and political organization of medieval Bosnia (Studije o teritorijalnopolitičkoj organizaciji srednjovjekovne Bosne)
- Visoko and environment through history (Visoko i okolina kroz istoriju)

== Literature ==
- Vego, Marko (1982) [1982]. Postanak srednjovjekovne bosanske države. Sarajevo: Svjetlost, Sarajevo. p. 84.

== See also ==
- Nada Miletić
