= Usora (zemlja) =

Medieval region of Bosnia and Herzegovina

Zemlja Usora Usora
- Zemlja (Land) of Bosnian Banate then Kingdom
- earliest mention 20 July 1244–after 1463
- Zemlja's in the development of the medieval Bosnian state.
- Capital: Srebrenik, Tešanj
- Area
  - Coordinates: 44.341667°N 17.269444°E
- Status: Zemlja (Land)
- Government
  - Type: Feudal
- Duke of Bosnia or Grand Knyaz of Bosnia
  - 1241–1247: Matej Ninoslav
  - 1353–1377: Tvrtko Ivanić
  - 1377–1395: Vlatko Tvrtković
  - 1395–1400: Vučina Vlatković
  - 1400–1424: Vukmir Zlatonosović
  - 1424–1430: Vukašin Zlatonosović
  - 1444–1463: Tvrtko Stančić
- Historical era: Medieval Bosnia
  - Established: earliest mention 20 July 1244
  - Disestablished: after 1463
- Contained within
  - Banate: Banate of Bosnia
  - Kingdom: Kingdom of Bosnia
- Subdivisions
  - Type: Župa
  - Units: Terra Tolis, Župa Modnna, Župa Nenavište, Župa Tešanj, Župa Gradačac, Župa Visori, Župa Koraj, Župa Ukrinica; later Župa Soli, Župa Sapna, Župa Zaušije
Succeeded by
Banate of Jajce; Sanjak of Bosnia
- Today part of: Bosnia and Herzegovina

Usora (Latin: Vozora, Hungarian: Ózora) was an important zemlja (transl. land; feudalna oblast transl. feudal region) of the medieval Bosnian state, first banate and later kingdom, although it also had some periods outside its jurisdiction and royal authority, when it was connected with neighboring banates of Slavonia, or Mačva at times. The administrative seat of this zemlja was Srebrenik, which also served as residence for its rulers for entire period of existence of the medieval Bosnian state. It took its name from the river Usora.

== Etymology ==
The name of the land of Usora derives from the eponymous river, which runs through its territories for approximately 80 kilometers, in direction south-southwest to north-northeast, and spills into the river Bosna just south of town of Doboj.

== Geography and location ==
Usora was the northernmost Bosnian land (zemlja), occupying very fertile Pannonian Plain, and its geographical location roughly correspond to modern-day Northern Bosnia gravitating toward Posavina. Its territory stretched roughly from the area of Kulaši and Prnjavor to its west, to Srebrenik and Lukavac to its east, the river Sava to its north and Žepče to its south. The land of Usora had many strong fortresses and towns on its territory, the most famous ones being Doboj (13th century), Srebrenik (1333), Dobor fortress (1387), Glaž (12th century), Soko fortress (14th century), Tešanj (14th century), Modriča town (13th century), and Maglaj (15th century).

== History ==
The region of Usora was first mentioned in a bull (decree) dated 20 July 1244 by the King Bela IV of Hungary, in which he assigned some properties to the Bishop of Bosnia, naming the territories: quod episeopus (Bosnensis) et capitulum decimas in Vozora, in Sou, in Olfeld et in aliis supis ... habeant et percipiant (Vozora referring to Usora, Sou to Soli, and Olfeld to Donji Kraji).

Soli was also specially organized in the early feudal period. As such, it entered the title of Bosnian rulers, but somewhere in the first half of the 14th century it completely merged with Usora. Apart from the name and only the approximate territory, we know nothing about the organization of this zemlja.

Although it was nominally included into the Hungarian Crown Lands, the Banate of Bosnia was a de facto independent state for the course of its existence, including Usora, which under Bosnia always retained certain amount of autonomy.

=== Battles ===
Notable battles include Battle of Srebrenik (1363), Battle of Dobor (1394) and (1408), and the Battle of Doboj (1415). During its history, this zemlja had been separated several times from the Banate of Bosnia and later Bosnian Kingdom, mostly by the Kingdom of Hungary which appointed rulers of this region, and sometimes attached it to Slavonian Banate. Prominent families, such as Babonići had estates there while the territories were part of Slavonian Banate. Bosnian bans and kings, starting with 1324 and Stephen II Kotromanić, who reclaimed Usora, and added both Usora and Soli to his title have relinquished direct rule over Land of Usora and started appointing their vassals as rulers, ending with the last Duke of Usora, Tvrtko Stančić, who died in May 1463 during Ottoman conquest of Bosnia.

== Religion ==
On its territory Bosnian Church flourished since the 13th century, strongly supported by local nobility. The Church held spacious land possessions, located between Dobor, in the south, and Dubnica near the Sava, in the north.

== Economy ==
Because of its geographical location, descending from the region of low hills in its south ends and spreading through north-Bosnian lowlands into the fertile Pannonian plains towards the Sava River, Usora had rich agriculture based economy. The Sava was always frequent trading route, and had rich fisheries. This economic potential, more often than not, made Usora most common battleground between Bosnians and the Hungarian kings who viewed them as subordinate. Usora was also famous for well developed falconry among its nobility.

== List of rulers ==
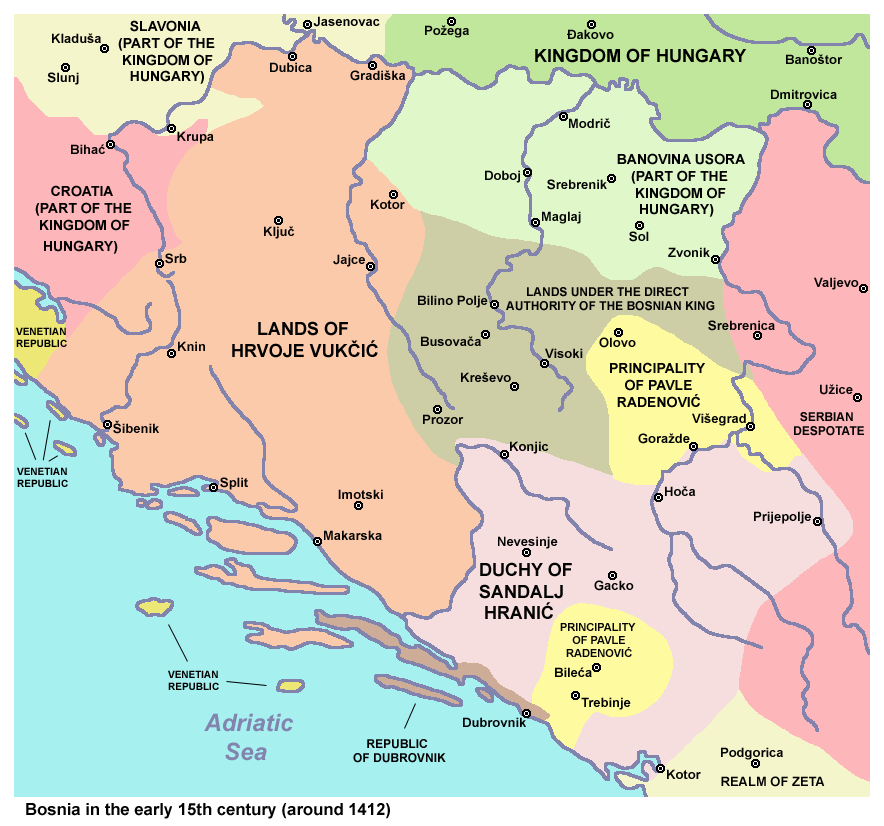
Bosnian Kingdom and its zemljas at the beginning of the 15th century.

- 1190s – 1220: Stjepan, Ban of Bosnia, likely also ruled Soli, first historically documented ruler of Usora;
- 1220-1241: Sibislav, son of ban Stjepan, supported Hungary in its crusade against Bosnian Church;
- 1241–1247: Matej Ninoslav, the Ban of Bosnia, waged defensive war against Hungary, and after the loss of Usora to Hungarians, he remained the ban of all other Bosnian lands until his death in 1250;
- 1322–1329: Stjepan II, also ban of Bosnia, grandson of Vladislav; from 1322, when Stephen II Kotromanic became a ban of Bosnia, Usora was part of his realm and was included in the titles of all subsequent bans and kings in Bosnia;
- 1329–1353: Vojko, Duke of Usora (land of Soli absorbed into Usora as župa Soli by 1330), Bosnian nobleman and vassal to Stjepan II, ban of Bosnia;
- 1353–1377: Tvrtko Ivanić, Duke of Usora, Bosnian nobleman and vassal to the first Bosnian King Tvrtko I Kotromanić;
- 1377–1395: Vlatko Tvrtković, son of Duke Tvrtko of Usora, Bosnian nobleman and vassal to king Tvrtko I;
- 1395–1400: Vučina Vlatković, son of Duke Vlatko of Usora, Bosnian nobleman and vassal to Bosnian king Dabiša;
- 1400–1424: Vukmir Zlatonosović, Bosnian nobleman and vassal to Bosnian royal Kotromanić dynasty;
- 1424–1430: Vukašin Zlatonosović, Vukmir's brother, Bosnian nobleman and vassal to the Bosnian king Tvrtko II Kotromanić;
- 1435–1444: Matko Talovac, ban of Usora, vassal to king Tvrtko II;
- 1444–1463: Tvrtko Stančić, Duke of Usora, Bosnian nobleman and vassal to kings Thomas Kotromanić and Stjepan Tomašević, died in May 1463 while defending Bosnia from the Ottoman conquest.

=== List of Usora rulers after 1463 ===
Last Usora rulers governed re-organized region after the fall of Kotromanićs and conquest of the Bosnian Kingdom's territories south of Jajce and Usora by the Ottoman Empire in 1463.

- 1464–1477: Nicholas of Ilok, Duke of Usora, Macso, Slavonia and Dalmatia 1464–1471, and puppet king of Bosnia 1471–1477, installed by the Hungarians as a ruler of a buffer state against Ottomans.
- 1465–1476: Matija Sabančić-Radivojević, son of Radivoj Ostojić, younger brother of Bosnian king Tomas Kotromanić, puppet Bosnian king installed by Ottomans as a counter measure to Nicholas of Ilok.
- 1476–1476: Matija Vojsalić, second and last puppet king in Bosnia installed by Ottomans, ruled only 6 fortresses in central and south Usora (Doboj, Maglaj, Tešanj, Žepče, Vranduk and Travnik).

=== Interregnum and titular rulers under Hungarian suzerainty ===
Second half of the 13th century was a period after Matej Ninoslav lost it to Hungary, and the rulers were appointed by the King of Hungary.

- 1247–1262: Rostislav Mikhailovich, Russian prince from Rurik dynasty, also Duke of Macsó
- 1262–1272: Béla, son of Rostislav, also Duke of Macsó
- 1272–1273: Henry I Kőszegi, also titular ban of Soli
- 1273–1275: Ernye Ákos, also titular ban of Soli
- 1284–1316: Stefan Dragutin, also king of Syrmia
- 1316–1322: Vladislav, also king of Syrmia, son of the preceding

== See also ==
- Soli (zemlja)

== Sources ==
- Anđelić, Pavao (1982). Studije o teritorijalnopolitičkoj organizaciji srednjovjekovne Bosne [Studies on the territorial-political organization of medieval Bosnia] (in Serbo-Croatian). Sarajevo: "Svjetlost," OOUR Izdavačka djelatnost. pp. 9–24. OCLC 1650228.
- Fine, John Van Antwerp Jr. (1991) [1983]. The Early Medieval Balkans: A Critical Survey from the Sixth to the Late Twelfth Century. Ann Arbor, Michigan: University of Michigan Press. ISBN 0-472-08149-7.
- Fine, John Van Antwerp Jr. (1994) [1987]. The Late Medieval Balkans: A Critical Survey from the Late Twelfth Century to the Ottoman Conquest. Ann Arbor, Michigan: University of Michigan Press. ISBN 0-472-08260-4.
- Klaić, Nada (1989). Srednjovjekovna Bosna: Politički položaj bosanskih vladara do Tvrtkove krunidbe (1377. g.). Zagreb: Grafički zavod Hrvatske. ISBN 978-86-399-0104-2.
- Malcolm, Noel (1994). Bosnia: A Short History. New York: NYU Press. ISBN 978-0-8147-5520-4.
- Vego, Marko (1982). Postanak srednjovjekovne bosanske države. Sarajevo: Svjetlost.
- Ćirković, Sima (2014) [1964]. "The Double Wreath: A Contribution to the History of Kingship in Bosnia". Balcanica (45): 107–143. doi:10.2298/BALC1445107C.
- Ćirković, Sima (2004). The Serbs. Malden: Blackwell Publishing. ISBN 978-1-4051-4291-5.
- Moravcsik, Gyula, ed. (1967) [1949]. Constantine Porphyrogenitus: De Administrando Imperio (2nd revised ed.). Washington D.C.: Dumbarton Oaks Center for Byzantine Studies. ISBN 978-0-88402-021-9.
