= Petar Kovačević =

15th century Bosnian nobleman

Petar Kovačević (Serbian Cyrillic: Петар Ковачевић; ?? — 1455) was a duke from the Bosnian Dinjčić noble family, which had its estates in the eastern parts of the medieval Bosnian state, in the Jadar region. He was the son of Kovač Dinjčić.

Petar was one of the most prominent members of the Dinjčić dynasty. He was accepted as a citizen of Dubrovnik on 27 July 1440. In the great Christian coalition against the Ottomans, he allied with the despot Đurađ Branković. The great Christian coalition was led by the Hungarian king Vladislav I and Janko Hunyadi, the lord of Transylvania. The army numbered 25,000 Hungarian and 8,000 Serbian horsemen, including 700 of Peter's Bosnian horsemen. Together with the despot Đurđe Branković, he captured Srebrenica in 1443, but he soon abandoned Serbian despot and in 1455 he attacked him and Srebrenica on order of his king, Stjepan Tomaš. He was killed in this battle by the Serbians and one document records it with the words:

"Dmitar Radojević killed Petar Kovačević near Srebrenica" (Ubi Dmitar Radojević Petra Kovačevića pod Srebrenicom)

== See also ==
- Hrvoje Vukčić
- Zlatonosović noble family

== Bibliography ==
- Spasić, Palavestra, Mrđenović, Dušan; Aleksandar; Dušan (1991). Rodoslovne Tablice I Grbovi Srpskih Dinastija I Vlastele [Genealogical plates and coats of arms of Serbian dynasties and rulers]. Beograd. pp. 77, 78. ISBN 978-86-7685-007-5.
- Rudić, Srđan (2006). Властела Илирског грбовника. Београд: Историјски институт САНУ. ISBN 9788677430559.
- Filipović, Emir O. (2019). Bosansko kraljevstvo i Osmansko carstvo: (1386-1463) (in Bosnian). Orijentalni institut Univerziteta u Sarajevu. ISBN 978-9958-626-47-0.
