= Brailo Tezalović =

15th century Bosnian nobleman

Gospodin Brailo Tezalović
- Knez (English: Lord)

carinik (toll officer)
- Born: Prača
- Died: 1433
- Father: Mihoje
- Mother: Vladija
- Occupation: in service of Pavlovićs as carinik (toll officer)

Brailo Tezalović (Serbian Cyrillic: Браило Тезаловић, Latin: Braylus Thessalovich; fl. 1392–1433) was a Bosnian knez and merchant, nobleman and diplomat, who served Bosnian magnate Pavle Radinović and his family, with the court title of carinik (customs official). Brailo was born into a merchant family from Prača in eastern Bosnia, the son of Mihoje and Vladija, and grandson of Radan. He had three younger brothers, Bogiša, Hval, and Vukosav. Brailo was first mentioned in a document dated to June 1392, then mentioned in February 1399 as a customs official (carinik) of count (knez) Pavle Radinović in Ledenice. In the following years he was a diplomat in the service of the Pavlović noble family. Brailo Tezalović, Bogdan Muržić and Brajko Hvaonić, all from Prača, were the biggest merchants in Bosnia of their time. The main article of commerce was lead, likely mostly from the lead mines in Olovo. The debts of individuals in Bosnia were different and ranged around 100 ducats, but sometimes could cross over 1000 ducats (merchants from Prača reaching the largest individual credits); Brailo, as the representative of another merchant from Prača (Brajko Hvaonić), raised the credit to 2965 ducats. In 1411, Brailo is mentioned as the protovestijar of Pavle for the first time. Only in 1413, Brailo sent 11,5 wagons of lead to the Republic of Ragusa. He was first mentioned with the title of knez on 31 July 1421, and was inscribed as a witness in the charters of the Pavlović in 1427, 1432 and 1433. His importance at the Pavlović court is evident from the fact that the Ragusans viewed him as an especially important person in the discussions over the sale of Konavle; when the sale was finalized, Brailo received 500 ducats and a parcel of land from Ragusa. He was mentioned as deceased on 28 January 1446.

In ca. 1466, nine noblemen from Hum stated before the Ragusan government that they had "served and courted together with knez Brailo and his brother for lord vojvoda Pavle Radinović.

== Sources ==
- Ćirković, Sima; Mihaljčić, Rade (1999). Лексикон српског средњег века (in Serbian). Knowledge. ISBN 9788683233014.
- Dunić, Mihailo (1967). Les Familles nobles de Hum et de Trebinje ... (in Serbian). Académie serbe des sciences et des arts. p. 50.
- Kovačević-Kojić, Desanka (1978). Agglomérations urbaines dans l'état médiéval bosniaque (in Serbian). Veselin Masleša.
- Kurtović, Esad (2010). Из хисторије банкарства Босне и Дубровника у средњем вијеку (улагање новца на добит) (in Serbian). Istorijski institut. pp. 109–116. ISBN 978-86-7743-083-2.
- Mihić, Ljubo (1975). Ljubinje sa okolinom (in Serbian). Dragan Srnic. p. 101.
- Mišić, Siniša (2010). Лексикон градова и тргова средњовековних српских земаља: према писаним изворима (in Serbian). Завод за уџбенике. ISBN 978-86-17-16604-3.
- Rudić, Srdjan (2006). Властела Илирског грбовника: The Nobility of the Illyric Coat of Arms (in Serbian). Istorijski institut Beograd. pp. 225–226. ISBN 978-86-7743-055-9.
