= Sultići =

Sultići Султићи
- Village
- Location within Bosnia and Herzegovina
- Coordinates: 43°44′N 17°51′E
- Country: Bosnia and Herzegovina
- Entity: Federation of Bosnia and Herzegovina
- Canton: Herzegovina-Neretva
- Municipality: Konjic

Area
  - Total: 0.77 sq mi (2.00 km^{2})

Population (2013)
  - Total: 144
  - Density: 186/sq mi (72.0/km^{2})
- Time zone: UTC+1 (CET)
  - Summer (DST): UTC+2 (CEST)

Sultići (Cyrillic: Султићи) is a village in the municipality of Konjic, Bosnia and Herzegovina.

== Demographics ==
According to the 2013 census, its population was 144.

Ethnicity in 2013
Ethnicity	Number	Percentage
Bosniaks	114	79.2%
Croats	26	18.1%
other/undeclared	4	2.8%
Total	144	100%
