= Sandalj, Serbia =

Sandalj
- Village (Selo)
- Location within Serbia
- Coordinates: 44°14′N 19°47′E
- Country: Serbia
- District: Kolubara District
- Municipality: Valjevo

Population (2002)
  - Total: 155
- Time zone: UTC+1 (CET)
  - Summer (DST): UTC+2 (CEST)

Sandalj is a village in the municipality of Valjevo, Serbia. According to the 2002 census, the village has a population of 155 people.

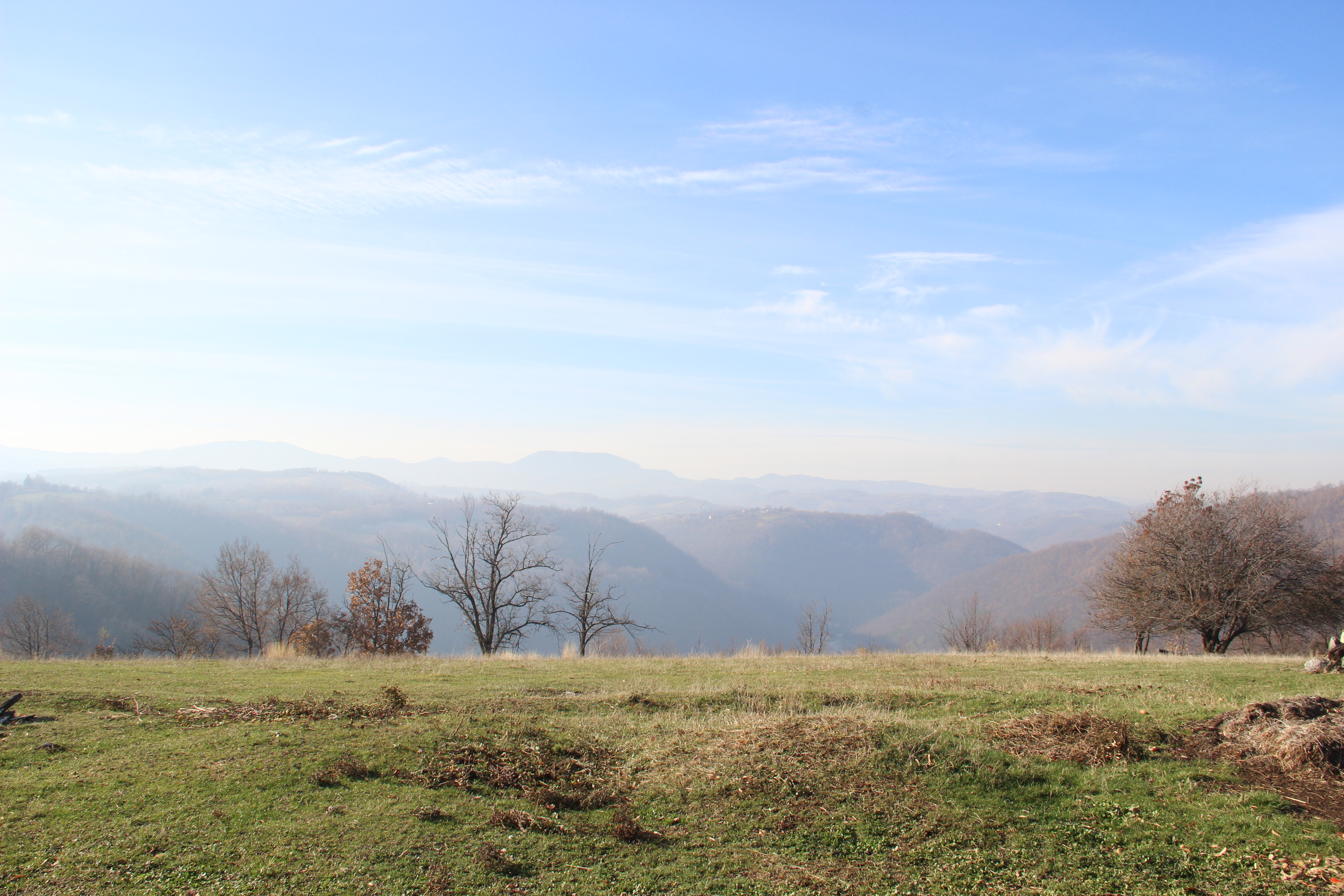
Sandalj - panorama

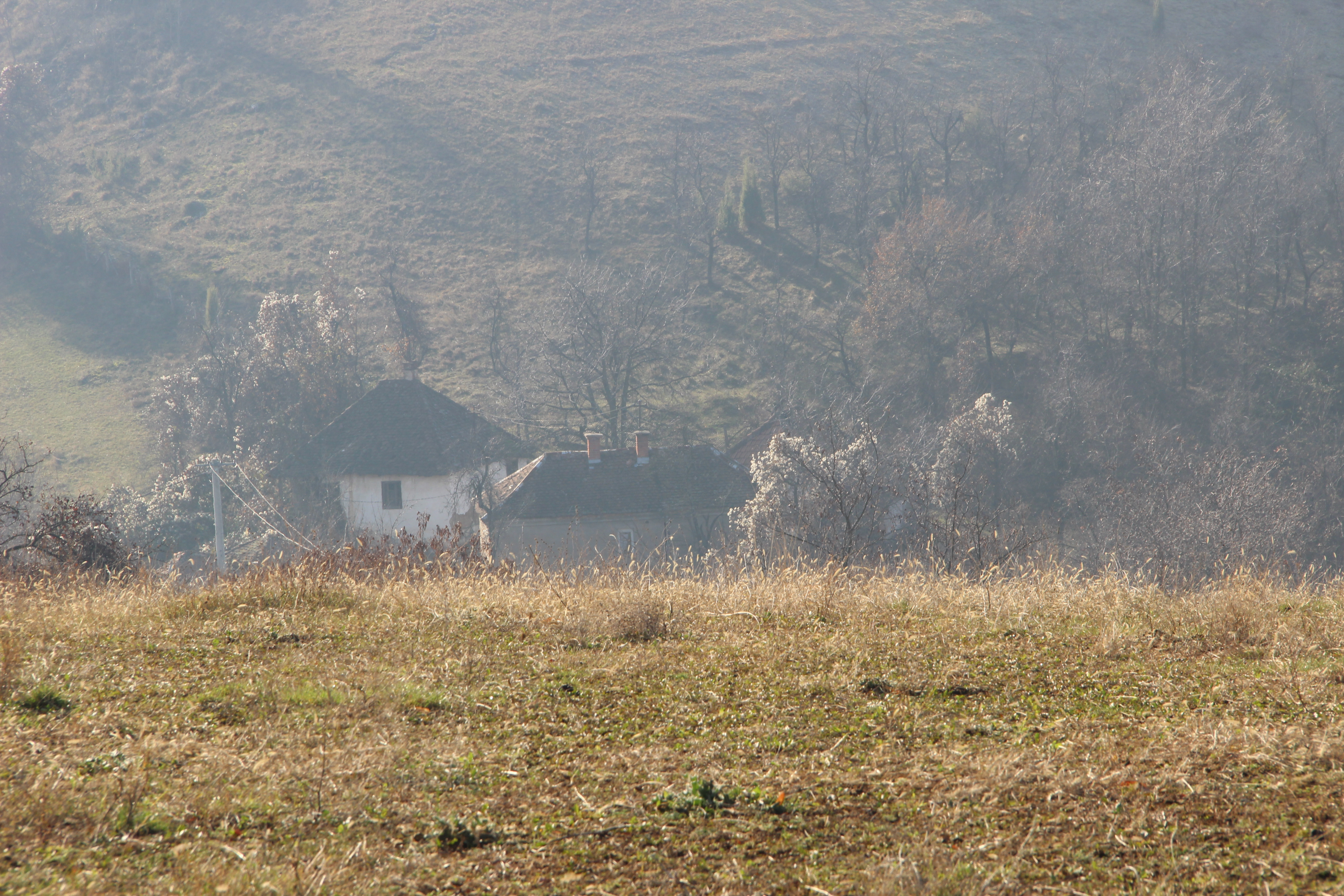
Sandalj - panorama

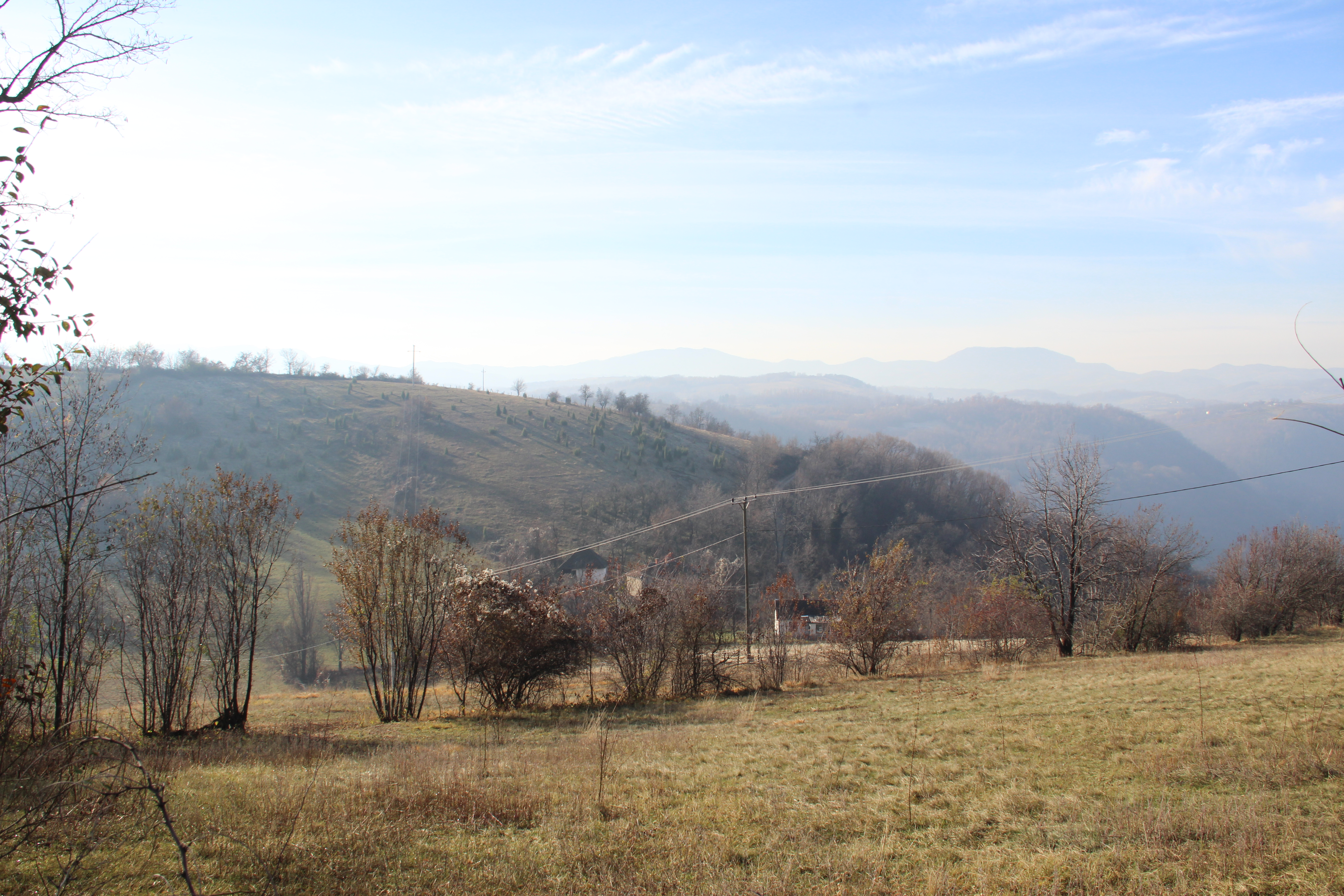
Sandalj - panorama

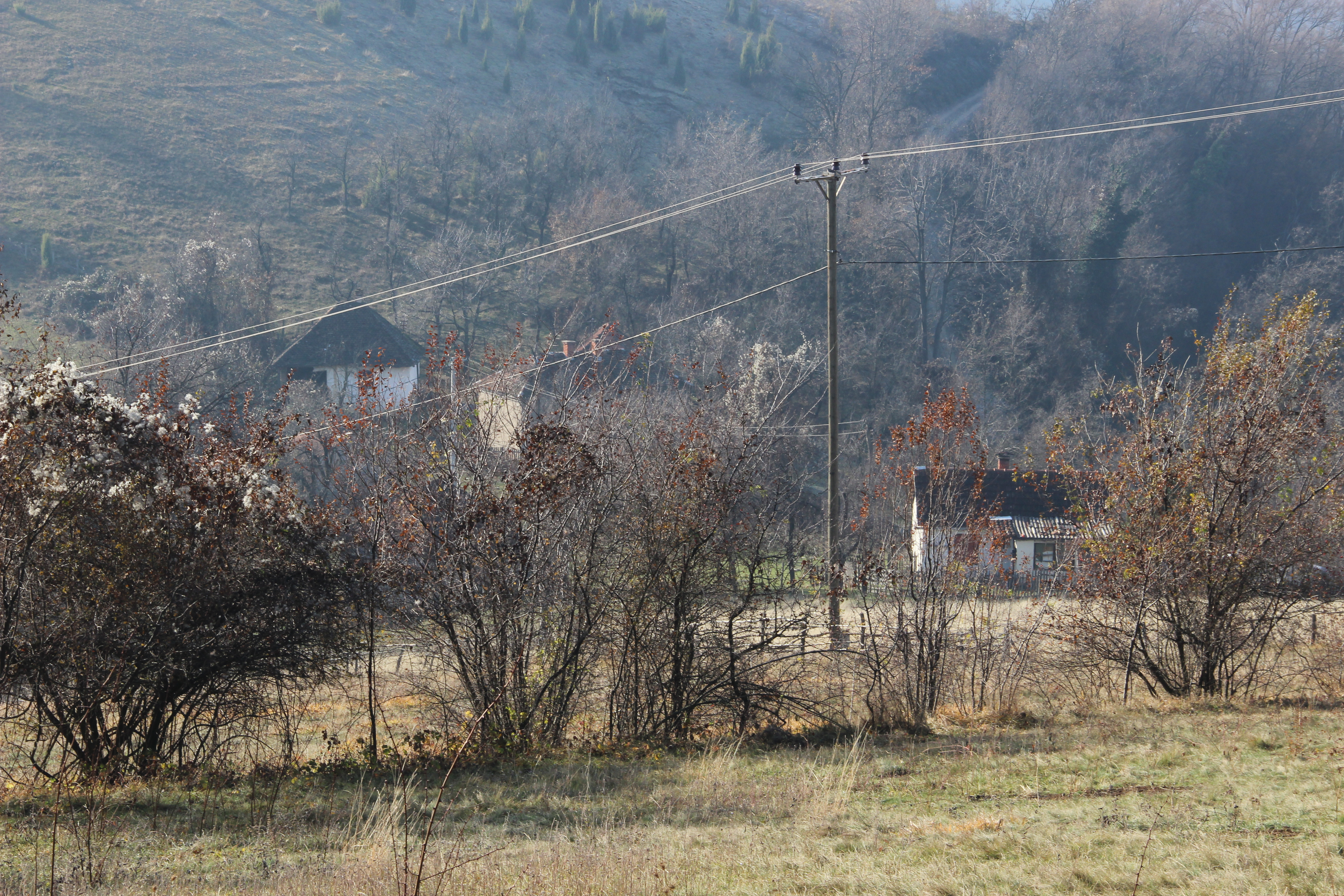
Sandalj - panorama

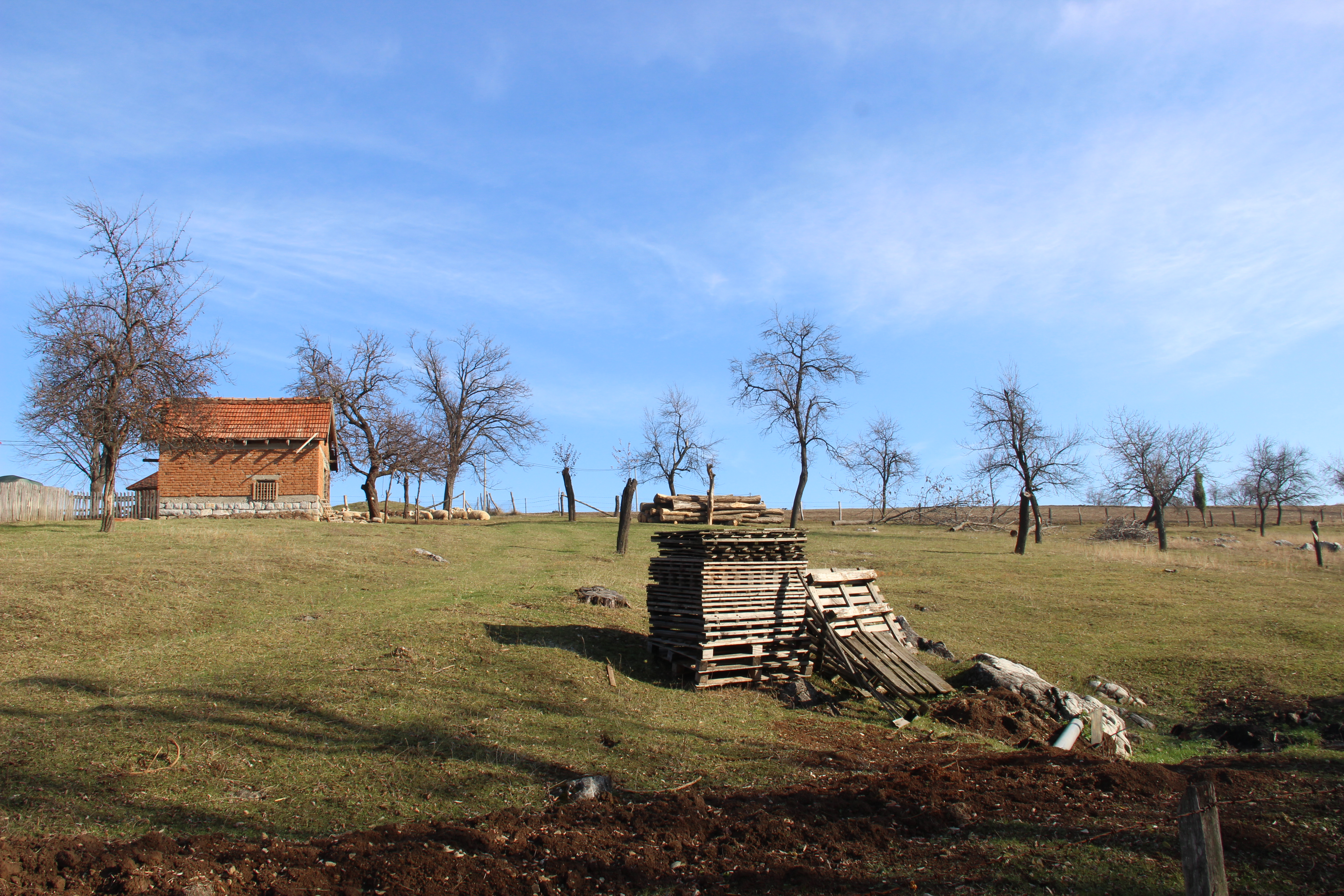
Sandalj - panorama

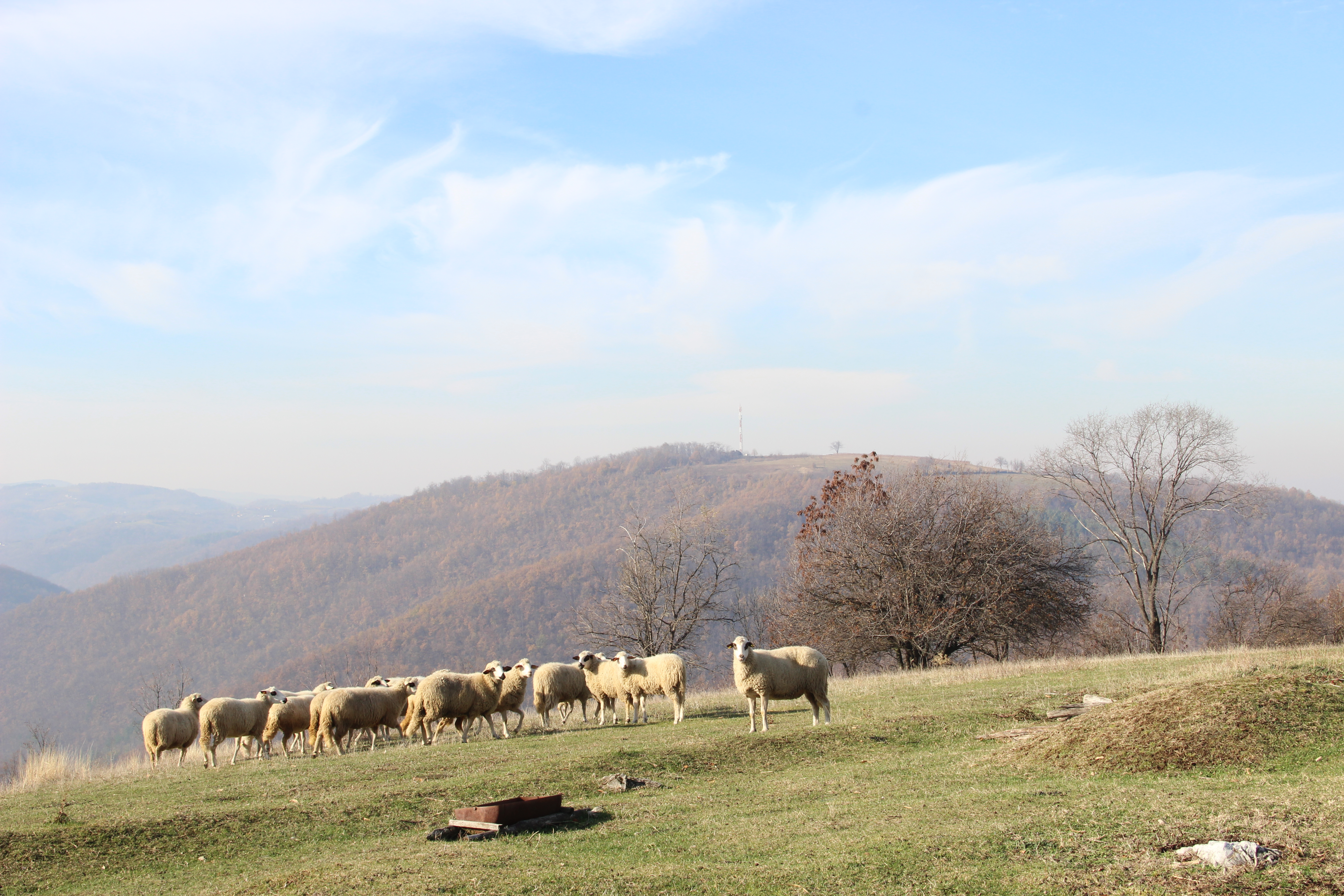
Sandalj - panorama

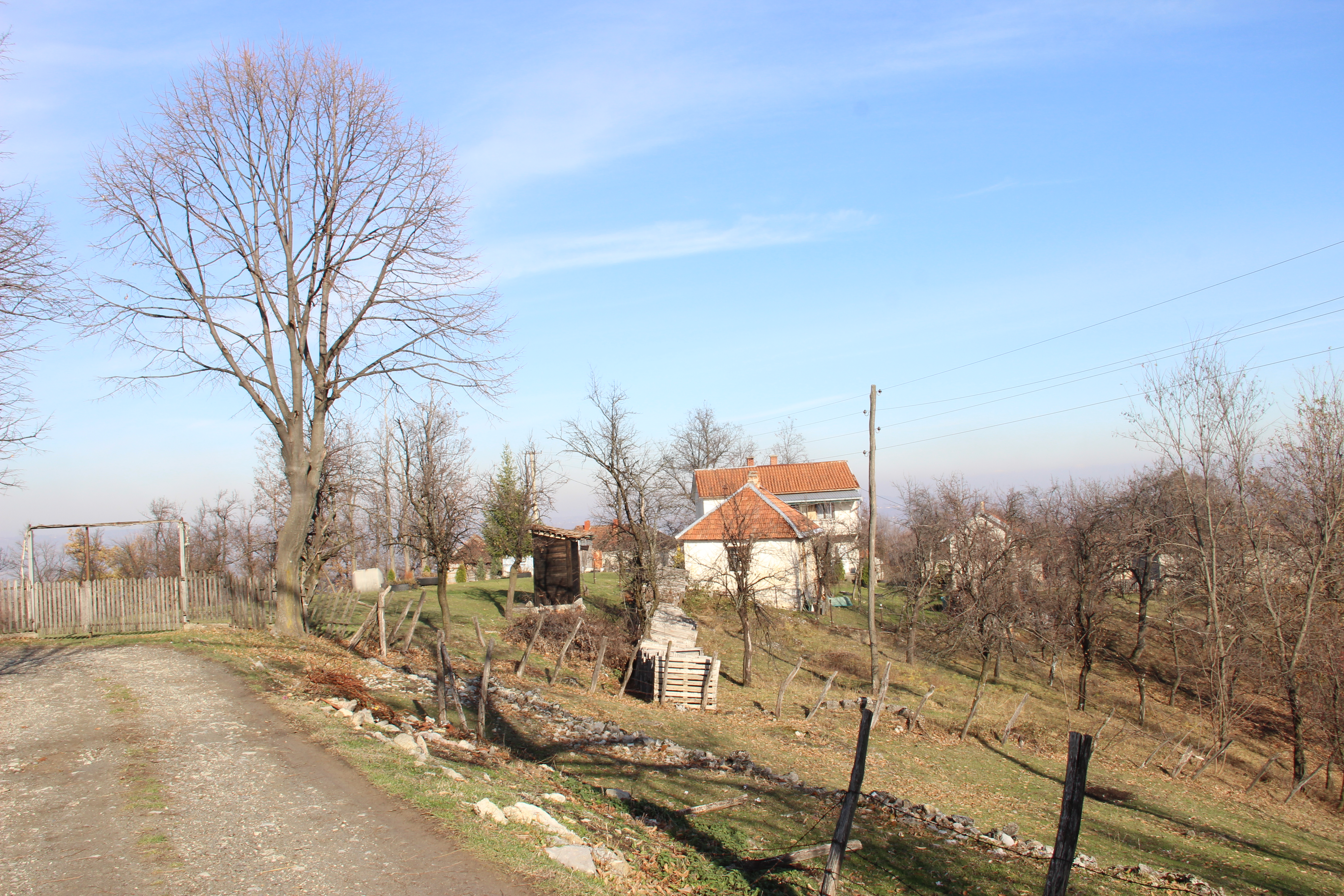
Sandalj - panorama
