= Pejo Ćošković =

Bosnian medievalist (born 1952)

- Born: 12 April 1952 (age 74); Domaljevac
- Known for: Research on subject of Bosnian Church

Academic background
- Education: University of Belgrade
- Thesis: The structure of the "Bosnian Church" and its role in the XV. century (1988)

Academic work
- Discipline: Medievalistic
- Institutions: University of Sarajevo

Pejo Ćošković, born on 12 April 1952 in Domaljevac near Bosanski Šamac, is Bosnian medievalist and lecturer at the Faculty of Philosophy of the University of Sarajevo, Department of History, in Sarajevo, Bosnia and Herzegovina.

== Education ==
He graduated from the Franciscan Gymnasium in Visoko. He graduated in 1978 from the University of Belgrade Faculty of Philosophy, where he also received his master's degree in 1986 with the work Kingdom of Bosnia in the crucial years of 1443-1446. He defended his doctoral thesis, entitled The structure of the "Bosnian Church" and its role in the XV. century, in 1988, in Belgrade. He completed his postdoctoral training as a scholarship holder of the Italian government in 1989 at the University of Roma, the Faculty of Literature and Philosophy, the Department of Linguistics and Serbo-Croatian Literature.

== Career ==
He worked at the high school, the Institute of History and the Pedagogical Academy in Banja Luka. He works at the Miroslav Krleža Institute of Lexicography in Zagreb. In 2002, he was elected assistant professor, and in 2006, associate professor at the Faculty of Philosophy in Sarajevo, where he teaches subjects from the history of medieval Bosnia.

He attended a number of international and domestic scientific conferences, presenting research papers. He has published papers in number of scientific journals, Prilozi (transl. Contributions) of the Institute of History, Istorijski zbornik (transl. Historical Proceedings), Croatica Christiana Periodica, Radovi (transl. Work Papers) of the Faculty of Philosophy in Sarajevo on subjects of History, Art History, Archaeology, and others. He has written three books as well as a large number of treatises, scientific articles, contributions and about 1000 encyclopedic entries.

== Research interests ==
History of Bosnia in the Middle Ages, Bosnian Church and its clergy including Vlatko Tumurlić, history of the Banja Luka region, history of Croatia in the Middle Ages, and lexicography.

== Bibliography ==
Google Scholar scientist profile for Pejo Ćošković.

=== Special editions ===
1. Bosanska kraljevina u prijelomnim godinama 1443.-1446., Banja Luka, 1988.
2. Susret sa zagubljenom poviješću – područje Bosanske Gradiške u razvijenom srednjem vijeku, Zagreb, 2001.
3. Crkva bosanska u 15. vijeku, Sarajevo, 2005.; Prikaz, u:

=== Articles and treatises ===
1. Bosanska Dubica u bosansko-ugarskim odnosima 1398.-1402. godine, Istorijski zbornik 2, Banja Luka, 1981, 43–53.
2. O gostima 'Crkve bosanske', Istorijski zbornik 4, Banja Luka, 1983, 7-40.
3. O dolasku Stjepana Tomaša na vlast i njegovom međunarodnom priznanju, Istorijski zbornik 5, Banja Luka, 1985, 7-35.
4. Banjaluka i pomaganje jajcu 1525. godine, Istorijski zbornik 8, Banja Luka, 1987, 13–36.
5. Maglovita stoljeća (Tragom najstarijeg poznatog spomena Banjaluke), Glas 44/4950, Banja Luka 14.-15.02. 1987, 6.
6. Bosanski krstjani u ocima svojih kršcanskih suvremenika, Nastava povijesti III/4, Zagreb, 1988, 188–191.
7. Tomašev progon sljedbenika Crkve bosanske 1459., Migracije i Bosna i Hercegovina, Sarajevo, 1990, 43–50.
8. Od najstarijih vremena do 1527. godine, "Banjaluka", Institut za istoriju, Banja Luka 1990, 7-29.
9. Krstjanin Vlatko Tumurlić i njegovo doba (1403.-1423.), Croatica Christiana Periodica 35, Zagreb, 1995, 1-54.
10. Veliki knez bosanski Tvrtko Borovinić, Croatica Christiana Periodica 37, Zagreb, 1996, 57–81.
11. Bosansko-ugarski odnosi u širem kontekstu politickih gibanja u 10. vijeku, "Bosna i Hercegovina i svijet", Institut za istoriju, Sarajevo, 1996, 11–37.
12. Neproslavljena 500. obljetnica. Prilog pola stoljeća dugoj povijesti Banje Luke, Hrvatska misao 1, Sarajevo, 1997, 24–38.
13. Pogledi o povijesti Bosne i Crkvvi bosanskoj, Radovi Zavoda za hrvatsku povijest 32–33, Zagreb 1999–2000.
14. Ustrojstvo Crkve bosanske, Zbornik radova o fra Anđelu Zvizdoviću, Sarajevo-Fojnica, 2000, 61–83.
15. Bosna na prijelomu stoljeća i potvrda državnih granica 1406., Prilozi Instituta za istoriju u Sarajevu 31, Sarajevo, 2002, 57–81.
16. Četvrt stoljeća historiografije o Crkvi bosanskoj, Posebna izdanja ANUBiH CXX, Odjeljenje društvenih nauka 36, Sarajevo, 2003, 31–54.
17. Interpretacija Kniewaldova kritičkog izdanja bilinopoljske izjave, Prilozi Instituta za istoriju 32, Sarajevo, 2003, 75–117.

== Literature ==
- Redakcija, "Dr Pejo Ćošković", Istorijski zbornik, 10, Banjaluka, 1989, 249–251.
- Rade Mihaljčić, "Ћошковић Пејо", Енциклопедија српске историографије, Knowledge, Београд, 1997, 690.
- Pejo Ćošković, "Spomenica 60. godišnjice Filozofskog fakulteta u Sarajevu (1950–2010)", Filozofski fakultet, Sarajevo 2010, 135–1366.
- Pejo Ćošković,
