= Vlatko Tumurlić =

15th c. Bosnian nobleman and diplomat

- Occupations: poklisar (ambassador), counsellor
- Children: daughter Vučica, son Brajan, another unknown son
- Religion: Krstjanin (Christian schismatic heterodoxy)
- Church: Bosnian Church
- Ordained: court
- Offices held: cleric, diplomat, ambassador

Vlatko Tumurlić (Serbian Cyrillic: Влатко Тумурлић) was a krstjanin, a member of the Bosnian Church, a diplomat in the service of the Pavlović family.

== Life and career ==
Vlatko Tumurlić, a krstjanin, is better known as a diplomat, deputy in the service of the Pavlović family, than for his place and role in the hierarchy of the Bosnian Church.

Together with other deputies, he represented Knyaz Pavle Radinović in negotiations with the people of Ragusa (today Dubrovnik) during the Bosnian–Ragusan war of 1403–1404, and he also represented Duke Radoslav Pavlović in resolving the fate of the town of Sokol in Konavle in 1423. These affairs show that members of the Bosnian Church were appropriate and sufficient guarantors for the people of Dubrovnik in the most important issues they had with the Bosnian nobles Pavlovićs. Hence, it is assumed that during the 15th century the Bosnian Church was respected as a stable framework for solving important state issues for medieval Bosnian state, that nobles respected its strength, and that the people of Dubrovnik knew this and regularly requested that representatives of the Bosnian Church be included in important question negotiations and its resolutions.

== See also ==
- Gost Radin
- Batalo

== Bibliography ==
- Pejo Ćošković (14 June 1995). "KRSTJANIN VLATKO TUMURLIĆ I NJEGOVO DOBA (1403.-1423.)". Croatica Christiana Periodica (in Croatian). 19 (35): 1–54. ISSN 0350-7823.
