= Esad Kurtović =

Bosnian medievalish (born 1965)

Professor Esad Kurtović
- Born: April 1, 1965 (age 61); Arapuša near Bosanska Krupa
- Known for: Arhivska građa za historiju srednjovjekovne Bosne (transl. Archival material for the history of medieval Bosnia)

Academic background
- Education: University of Sarajevo
- Thesis: The structure of the "Bosnian Church" and its role in the XV. century (1988)

Academic work
- Discipline: Medieval studies
- Institutions: University of Sarajevo

Esad Kurtović (born April 1, 1965) is a Bosnian medievalist and professor at the Faculty of Philosophy of the University of Sarajevo, Department of History, in Sarajevo, Bosnia and Herzegovina.

== Education ==
He completed elementary school in his home-village and high school in Bosanska Krupa. He received a degree in history from the Department of History in the Faculty of Philosophy at the University of Sarajevo in 1990, graduating with a work on Dubrovnik colonies in medieval Serbia. In 2000, he defended his master's thesis entitled: Investing money for profit in the Konavle circle, and in 2006 he defended his doctoral thesis entitled: Sandalj Hranić Kosača and his time.

== Career ==
He worked in primary and secondary schools in Bosanska Krupa from 1990 to 1992. Since 1994 he has been working at the Department of History of the Faculty of Philosophy in Sarajevo, where he defended his master's and doctoral thesis. He was elected assistant professor in 2007, associate professor in the field of medieval history in 2012, and full professor in 2016.

== Research interests ==
His research interest encompasses the history of Bosnia in the Middle Ages, Bosnian nobility and the medieval history of Dubrovnik with a focus on the Republic of Ragusa. His research also includes the economic, social and political history of medieval Bosnia. His major work is on the bibliography and historiography of the Bosnian Middle Ages which was published in three volumes as Arhivska građa za historiju srednjovjekovne Bosne (transl. Archival material for the history of medieval Bosnia).

== Selected bibliography ==
He has published papers in a number of scientific journals, Prilozi (transl. Contributions) of the Institute of History, Istorijski zbornik (transl. Historical Proceedings), Radovi (transl. Work Papers) of the Faculty of Philosophy in Sarajevo on subjects of history, and others. He has written books as well as a large number of treatises, scientific articles, contributions and many articles.

- Bibliografija objavljenih izvora i literature o historiji srednjovjekovne Bosne 1978-2000, Sarajevo 2007.
- Veliki vojvoda bosanski Sandalj Hranić Kosača, Institute of History, Studies and Monographs, Book 4, Sarajevo 2009, 526 pp.
- Радосалићи – примјер 'једнократних презимена' средњега вијека, Institute of History, Studies 2, Belgrade 2009, 161 pp.
- Из хисторије банкарства Босне и Дубровника у средњем вијеку (Улагање новца на добит), Historical Institute, Special Edition, Book 59, Belgrade 2010, 173 pp.
- Vlasi Bobani, Society for the Study of Medieval Bosnian History, Special Edition I, Monograph I, Sarajevo 2012, 162 pp.
- Konj u srednjovjekovnoj Bosni, University of Sarajevo, Sarajevo 2014, 825 pp.
- Izvori za historiju srednjovjekovne Bosne I/1-2 (Ispisi iz knjiga zaduženja Državnog arhiva u Dubrovniku 1365-1521), ANU BiH, Material XXXI, CBI Book 2, Sarajevo 2017, I/1 XII+481; I/2 483–969.
- Iz povijesti dubrovačkoga zaleđa, Ogranak Matice hrvatske u Dubrovniku, Biblioteka Prošlost i sadašnjost 51, Dubrovnik 2018, 247 pp.
- Arhivska građa za historiju srednjovjekovne Bosne (Ispisi iz knjiga kancelarije Državnog arhiva u Dubrovniku 1341-1526), 1–3, Institute of History-Sarajevo Historical Archives, Sarajevo 2019, XVIII+1765 pp.
- Udžbenik sa historijskom čitankom za drugi razred gimnazije (co-authored Samir Hajrulahović), Sarajevo 2007.

=== Special editions ===
- Likovi srednjovjekovne bosanske historije (1350-1500)
- Mjesto i uloga konja u historiji srednjovjekovne Bosne
