= Dinjčić noble family =

Medieval Bosnian noble family

Dinjčić
- Parent house: Dinjčić
- Country: Kingdom of Bosnia
- Founded: 14th century
- Founder: Dinjica
- Final ruler: Ivaniš
- Titles: Vojvoda; English: Duke; Knez; English: Lord
- Estates: Jadar, Srebrenica, Drina
- Dissolution: 1463; Ottoman conquest
- Cadet branches: Kovačević

Dinjčić (Serbian Cyrillic: Дињчић), sometime Dinjičić (Serbian Cyrillic: Дињичић), later branch known as Kovačević, were Bosnian medieval noble family which flourished during kingdom period, and ruled the Jadar-Drinjača areal and wider Srebrenica region.

Family's founder is considered to be Dinjica, who flourished during 14th century. He had four sons, Dragiša, Kovač Dinjčić, Vladislav Dinjčić and Pavle Dinjčić.

== Coat of Arms ==
The family coat of arms is described in every iteration of the Illyrian Armorials, such as Fojnica Armorial at page 59. It depict a dragon motif above the helmet, in the crest. It also belongs to the Kovačević branch, which is evident from the comments.

== Family tree ==
- Dinjica
  - Dragiša,
    - Pokrajec,
  - Kovač Dinjčić,
    - Petar Kovačević
    - Tvrtko Dinjčić,
    - Ivaniš Dinjčić,
  - Vladislav Dinjčić
  - Pavle Dinjčić

== Gallery ==
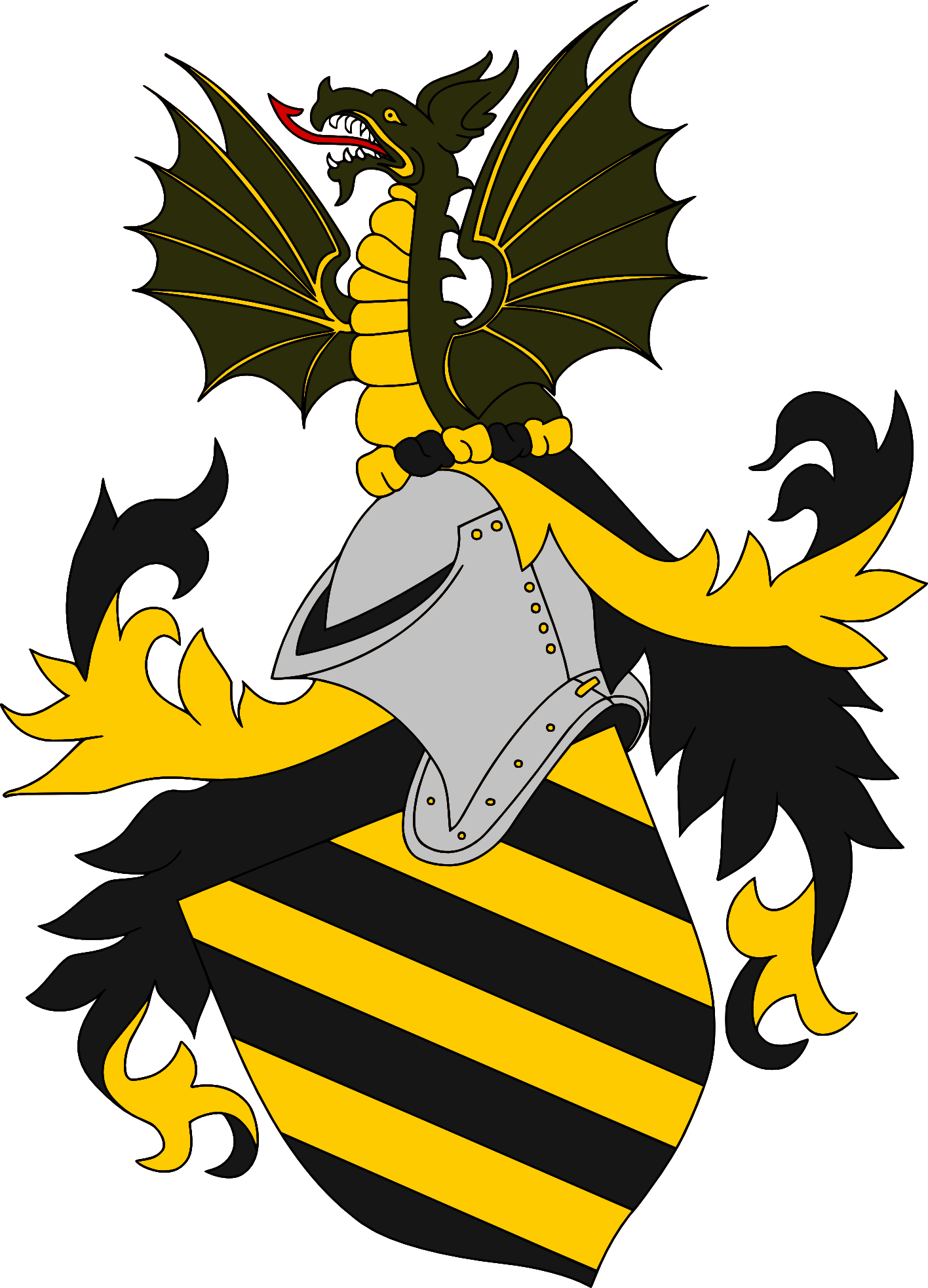
_{Proto-heraldic emblem usually assigned to the Bosnian medieval noble Dinjčić's family in the so called Illyrian armorials.}

== See also ==
- Hrvatinić
- Zlatonosović

== Bibliography ==
- Rudić, Srđan (2006). Властела Илирског грбовника. Београд: Историјски институт САНУ. ISBN 9788677430559.
- Ćirković, Sima (1964a). Историја средњовековне босанске државе. Београд: Српска књижевна задруга.
- Šabanović, Hazim (1959). Bosanski pašaluk: Postanak i upravna podjela. Sarajevo: Naučno društvo Bosne i Hercegovine.
- Spasić, Dušan; Palavestra, Aleksandar; Mrđenović, Dušan (1991). Rodoslovne Tablice I Grbovi Srpskih Dinastija I Vlastele [Genealogical plates and coats of arms of Serbian dynasties and rulers]. Beograd. pp. 77, 78. ISBN 978-86-7685-007-5.
