= Stanak =

Stanak is the most common name used to refer to the assembly of nobility in medieval Bosnia. The assembly, in the original Bosančica: Сmɖɴɖк (Serbo-Croatian Cyrillic: Станак), was also known as the Rusag (from the Hungarian word orszag, meaning "state" or "nation"), Rusag bosanski, Zbor, Sva Bosna (meaning "Whole of Bosnia") or just Bosna, with the officials of the Republic of Ragusa employing several Latin terms as well. The term "stanak sve zemlje Bosne", is first attested in the charter of Tvrtko I in 1354. Its influence peaked between the 1390s and the 1420s. The Serbian historian Sima Ćirković and most other Yugoslav scholars believed that the existence of the stanak proved a unity and feeling of belonging to a Bosnian identity and integrity, but also illustrated weakness of the monarch and decentralization of the state, as argued by American colleague John Van Antwerp Fine, Jr.

The right to take part in the sessions of the stanak was enjoyed by every Bosnian knez, from magnates to petty lords, collectively known as vlastela, but the ultimate authority belonged to the highest nobility. The stanak was convoked when required, usually by the ruler, who presided over it and led its sessions. If male, his wife was allowed to attend, but his children were not. The Bosnian Church clergy, not belonging to the vlastela, were also barred, but influenced decision-making in the stanak through the great lords associated with them. The magnates of the country convoked the stanak themselves when the country experienced greater domestic issues, such as succession crisis or deposition of the ruler, domestic conflicts or wars. It normally took place wherever the monarch held court: in Mile, Milodraž, Bobovac, Kraljeva Sutjeska and Jajce.

The stanak enjoyed great power and authority; it deliberated on matters such as election of the new king or queen and coronation, foreign policy, sale or cession of territory, contracting and signing treaties with neighboring countries, and military issues. Charters issued by monarchs reflected the decisions made by the stanak; as the royal power weakened, that of stanak increased.

== Bibliography ==
- Ćirković, Sima (1964). Историја средњовековне босанске државе [History of the medieval Bosnian state] (in Serbian). Srpska književna zadruga.
