= Srđan Rudić =

Serbian historian (born 1968)

Srđan Rudić (born 1968) is a Serbian historian. His works focus on Medieval studies. Rudić was born in Prokuplje, and graduated from the University of Belgrade. His notable work is Vlastela Ilirskog grbovnika (Властела Илирског грбовника), studying the nobility included in the Illyrian Armorials. He has been the director of the Institute of History since 2010.
