= Royal court in Sutjeska =

Medieval Bosnian court

Medieval royal court of the Bosnian kings in Sutjeska
- Bosnian: Stolno misto
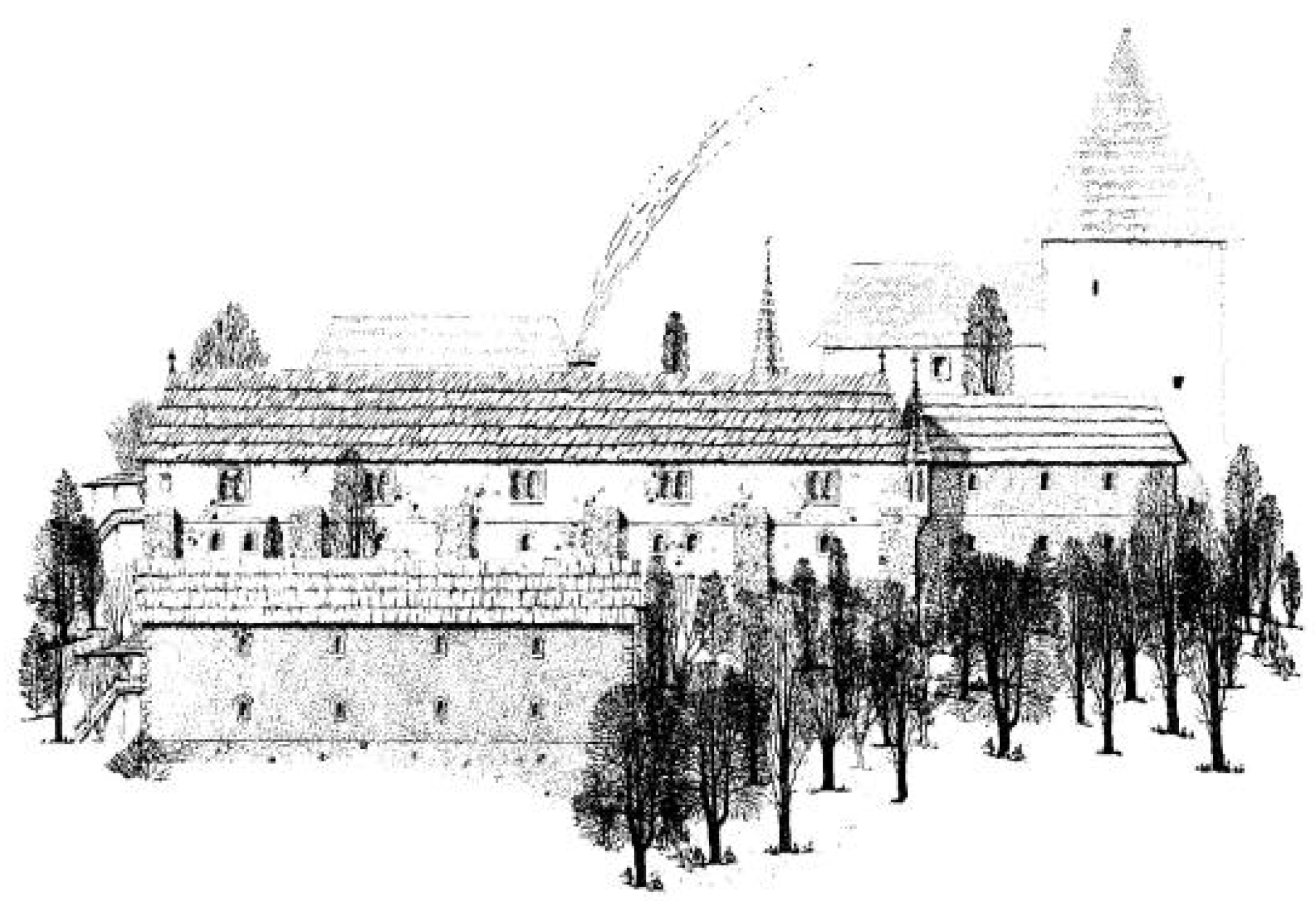
- Reconstruction in sketch of the medieval royal court of the Bosnian kings in Sutjeska, based on layout of remains - looking west to east

- Location within Bosnia and Herzegovina
- Interactive map of the Medieval royal court of the Bosnian kings in Sutjeska area

General information
- Status: Destroyed
- Type: Royal residence / court: Royal residence (14th–15th c.); Royal chapel
- Architectural style: Romanesque, Gothic
- Location: Kraljeva Sutjeska, Bosnia and Herzegovina
- Coordinates: 44.121932°N 18.201187°E
- Construction started: early 14th c.
- Demolished: 1463
- Client: Bosnian bans and kings
- Owner: state, (proscribed by KONS)

Technical details
- Structural system: Various low buildings surrounding courtyards, pavilions, gardens and royal chapel
- Size: 2,500 to 5,000 m^{2} (27,000 to 54,000 sq ft)

Design and construction
- Engineer: unknown (probably local-traditional)
- Designations

KONS of Bosnia and Herzegovina
- Official name: "Rulers' court of the fourteenth and fifteenth centuries in Kraljeva Sutjeska, the archaeological site (1844)".
- Type: Category II cultural monument
- Criteria: II. Value - Criteria for designation A, B, C i.iv.vi., D i.iv, F iii., G, H i., I iii.
- Designated: 8 October 2003 (?th session)
- Reference no.: 1840
- Decision (Protocol) no.: 06-6-42/03-3
- Status: National Monuments of Bosnia and Herzegovina

Royal Court in Sutjeska was a medieval Bosnian court, residence, and administrative seat of the Bosnian bans and kings, from mid-fourteenth to mid-fifteenth century, located in present-day Kraljeva Sutjeska, Bosnia and Herzegovina. The compound consisted of several buildings, chapel, and the nucleus of what would later become Kraljeva Sutjeska Franciscan Monastery.

== History ==
The court in Trstionica (present-day Kraljeva Sutjeska) was established by Ban of Bosnia, Stjepan II Kotromanić.

== Location ==
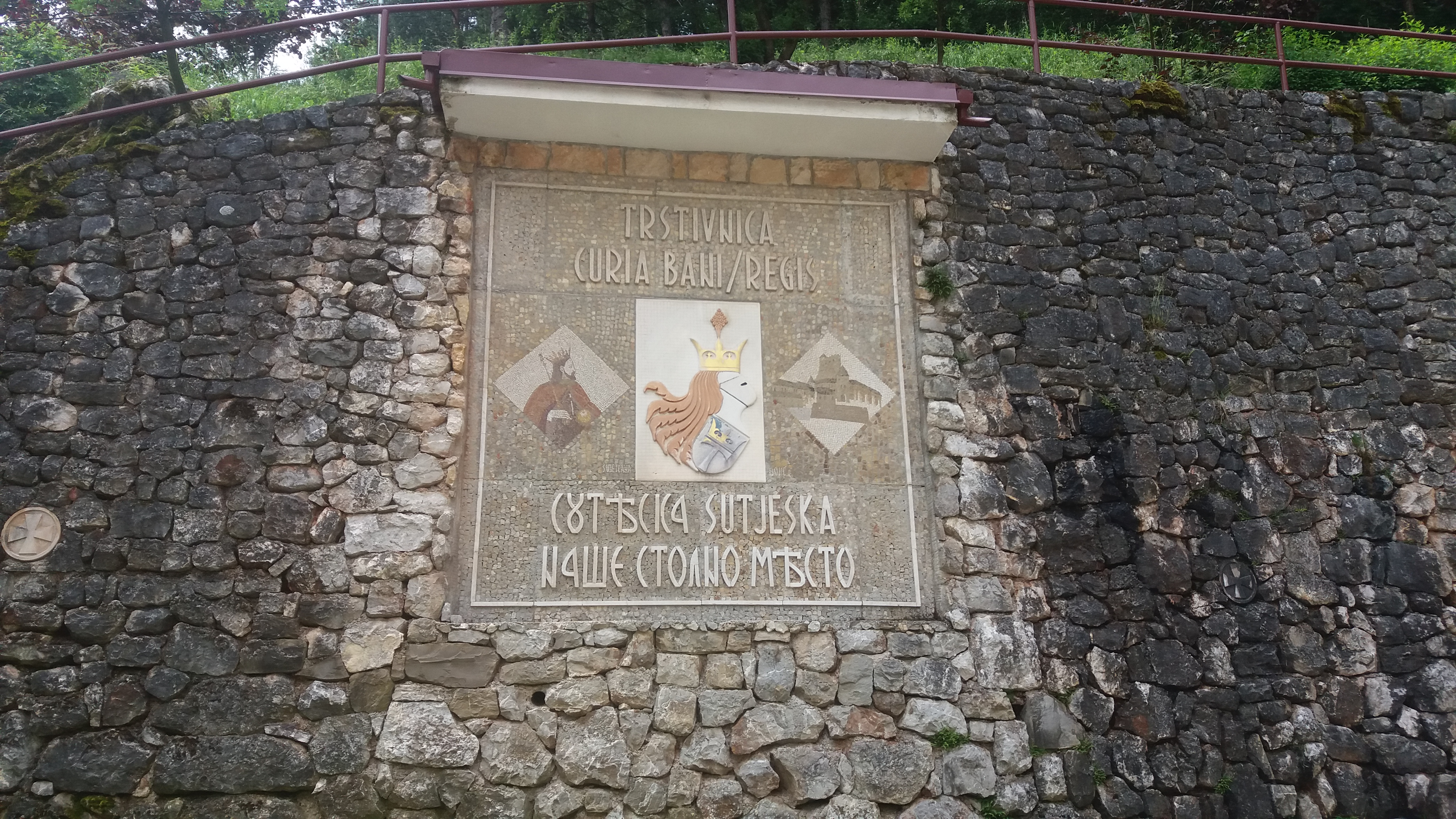
Plaque on the friary retaining wall

The court remains are located in present-day Kraljeva Sutjeska, Bosnia and Herzegovina.

The remains of the royal court are situated on the small prominence next to the Kraljeva Sutjeska Franciscan friary and church. This prominence is called Grgurevo. The site is separated in two distinct parts by small Urva brook.

The court and its chapel are mentioned in 1378 in the charter of the King Tvrtko I. The court chapel (church) was dedicated to Saint Gregory the Miracle-Worker (Sveti Grgur Čudotvorac) . Thus, the whole hillside and the terrace, once the church foyer, is called Grgurevo.

=== Patron Saints and the site name ===
In medieval Bosnia, Sveti Grgur, or Saint Gregory the Miracle-Worker, spread through the rise of the new territorial church, the schismatic Bosnian Church, after the Catholic episcopal see had to move out from Bosnia to Đakovo, in the first half of the 13th century. This prompted Bosnians to search for a new confessional identity, so in a fully autonomous act, unrecognized by papacy at the time, Bosnian political and ecclesiastical hierarchy turned the saint, also known for his state-building role, into both the ruling Kotromanić dynasty and the state patron of the Bosnian Kingdom. Patronage of Saint Gregory the Miracle-Worker will eventually get its recognition by Pope Pius II, in late 1461. Meanwhile, the cult of St. Gregory, maintained by the Bosnian Church, will see another manifestation in Gregory of Nazianzus in the first half of the 15th century, which will change to Saint Gregory the Great with King Thomas' conversion to Catholicism in late 1440s early 1450s. St. Gregory has been the patron saint of Bosnia and Herzegovina from the medieval times until 26 August 1752, when he was replaced by St. Elijah (Sveti Ilija), and confirmed by papacy, at the request of a Bosnian Franciscan friar, Bishop Pavao Dragičević. The reasons for the replacement are unclear. It has been suggested that Elijah was chosen because of his importance to all three main religious groups in Bosnia and Herzegovina—Catholics, Muslims and Orthodox Christians. Pope Benedict XIV is said to have approved Bishop Dragičević's request with the remark that "a wild nation deserved a wild patron".

During the 15th century, two other saints with the name Gregory appear successively as the patron saints of both the Bosnian state and the Kotromanić dynasty in the late 15th century. The first was St. Gregory of Nazianzus the Theologian, who was Archbishop of Constantinople and one of the great church fathers from the 4th century, and the other was Pope Saint Gregory the Great (ca. 540 – 604). They appear on the reverse of the coins of the Bosnian kings, Tvrtko II, Stjepan Tomaš and Stjepan Tomašević, with Pope Gregory shown with miter and shepherd's staff in his hand.

== Archeology ==
The excavations of 1969 to 1970, led by Pavao Anđelić of University of Sarajevo, unearthed foundations and walls of several buildings, including a church, an eastern palace, and western part of the court. Today only foundations and parts of the walls are visible and conserved.

The church was built in Gothic style. The eastern palace, buildings closer to the existing Franciscan Church, is the oldest part of the royal court. The western complex includes three palaces.

== Bobovac royal fortress-town ==
In its close proximity is the location of medieval royal castle of Bobovac, the crown jewels of Bosnia were held. The royal chapel in Bobovac consisted the burial chamber of several Bosnian kings and queens. Nine skeletons have been found in the five tombs located in the mausoleum. The identified skeletons belong to kings Dabiša, Ostoja, Ostojić, Tvrtko II and Thomas. It is assumed that one of the remaining skeletons belongs to the last king, Tomašević, decapitated in Jajce on the order of Mehmed the Conqueror. Only one of the skeletons, found next to that of King Tvrtko II, is female and assumed to belong to Tvrtko II's wife, Queen Dorothy.

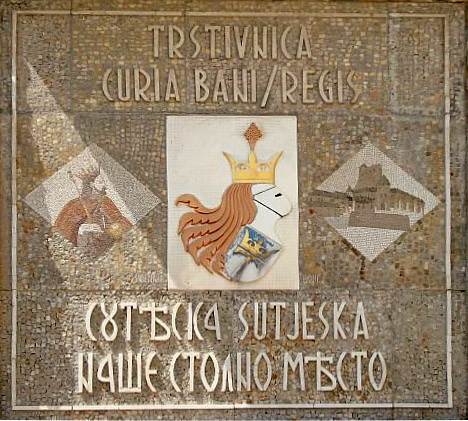
Above insignia: Latin: Trstivnica (Trstionica medieval village & river) - Latin: Curia Bani / Regis (transl. Ban's / Royal Office) below insignia: Bosnian Cyrillic: Сɣmѣскɖ ɴɖшє сmоʌɴо ʍѣсmо (Bosnian: Sutjeska naše stolno mjesto, transl. Sutjeska ours ruling seat)

== See also ==
- Jajce
- Visoki
- Mile
- List of National Monuments of Bosnia and Herzegovina
