= Zlatonosović noble family =

Bosnian medieval noble family

Zlatonosović
- Country: Banate of Bosnia; Kingdom of Bosnia
- Founded: fl. 14th c.
- Current head: Extinct
- Final ruler: Pavle Zlatonosović
- Titles: Knyaz; Duke
- Estates: Lower Edges, Western Sides in Bosnia, Dalmatia
- Dissolution: 1430's

The Zlatonosović family was a prominent medieval Bosnian noble family from the northeastern part of the country.

== History ==
The family was first attested in 1389. They sided with Sandalj Hranić and Radoslav Pavlović in 1427, when King Stephen Tvrtko II acknowledged Hungarian suzerainty by recognizing Hermann II of Celje as his heir presumptive and marrying Dorothy Garai. They did not attend the wedding. During the conflict between Tvrtko II and Serbian ruler Đurađ Branković they sided with Serbia and conquered the region of Zvornik. In 1430, Tvrtko II defeated Pavle Zlatonosović and reincorporated his territories into his realm. Zlatonosović's defeat marks the last mention of the family in historical records.

== Members ==
- Vukmir
- Vukašin
- Pavle

== Gallery ==
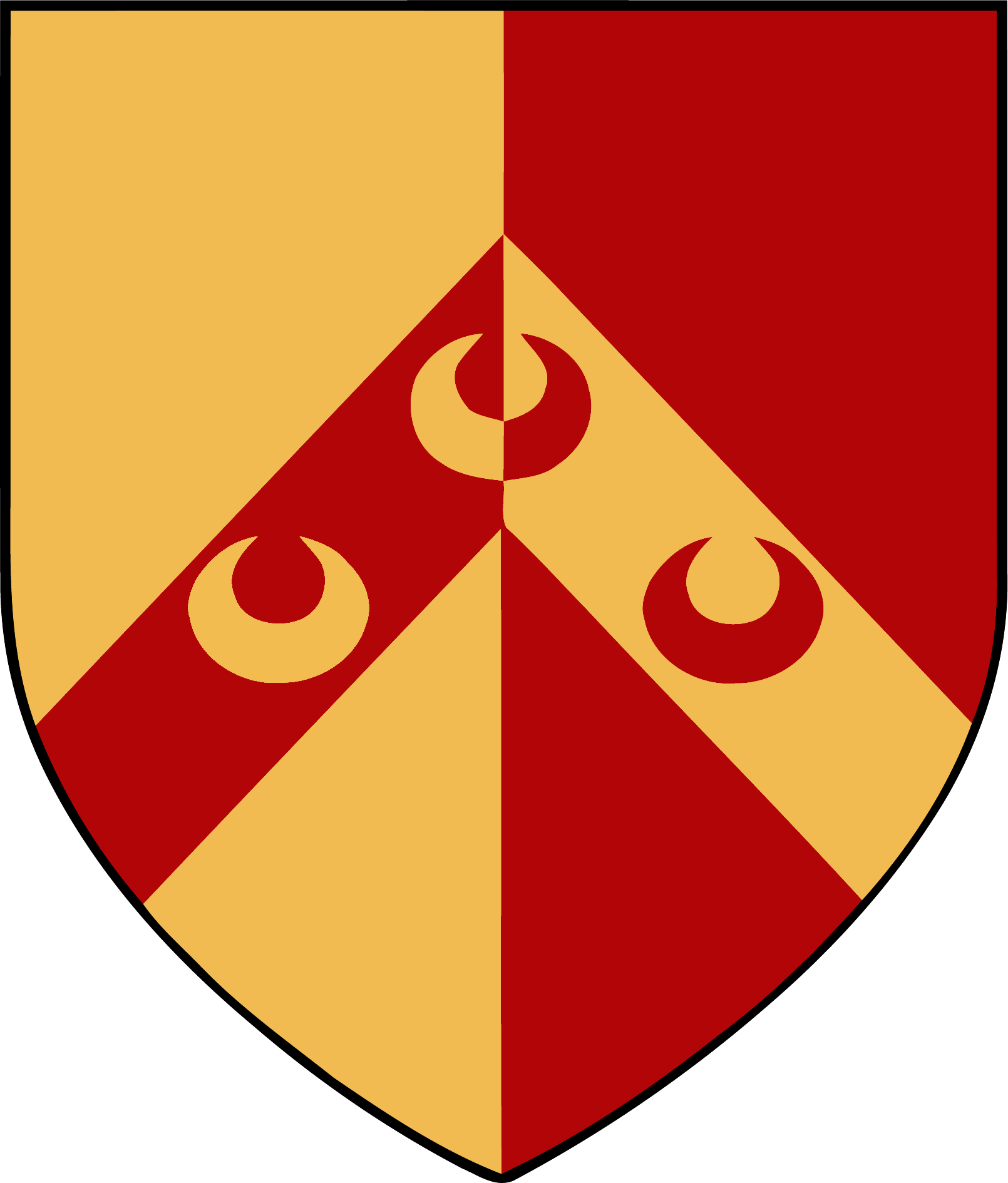
_{Proto-heraldic emblem usually assigned to the Bosnian medieval noble Zlatonosović family in the so called Illyrian armorials.}
