= Bobovac =

Fortified city of medieval Bosnia and Herzegovina

- Бобовац
- Vareš, Bosnia and Herzegovina
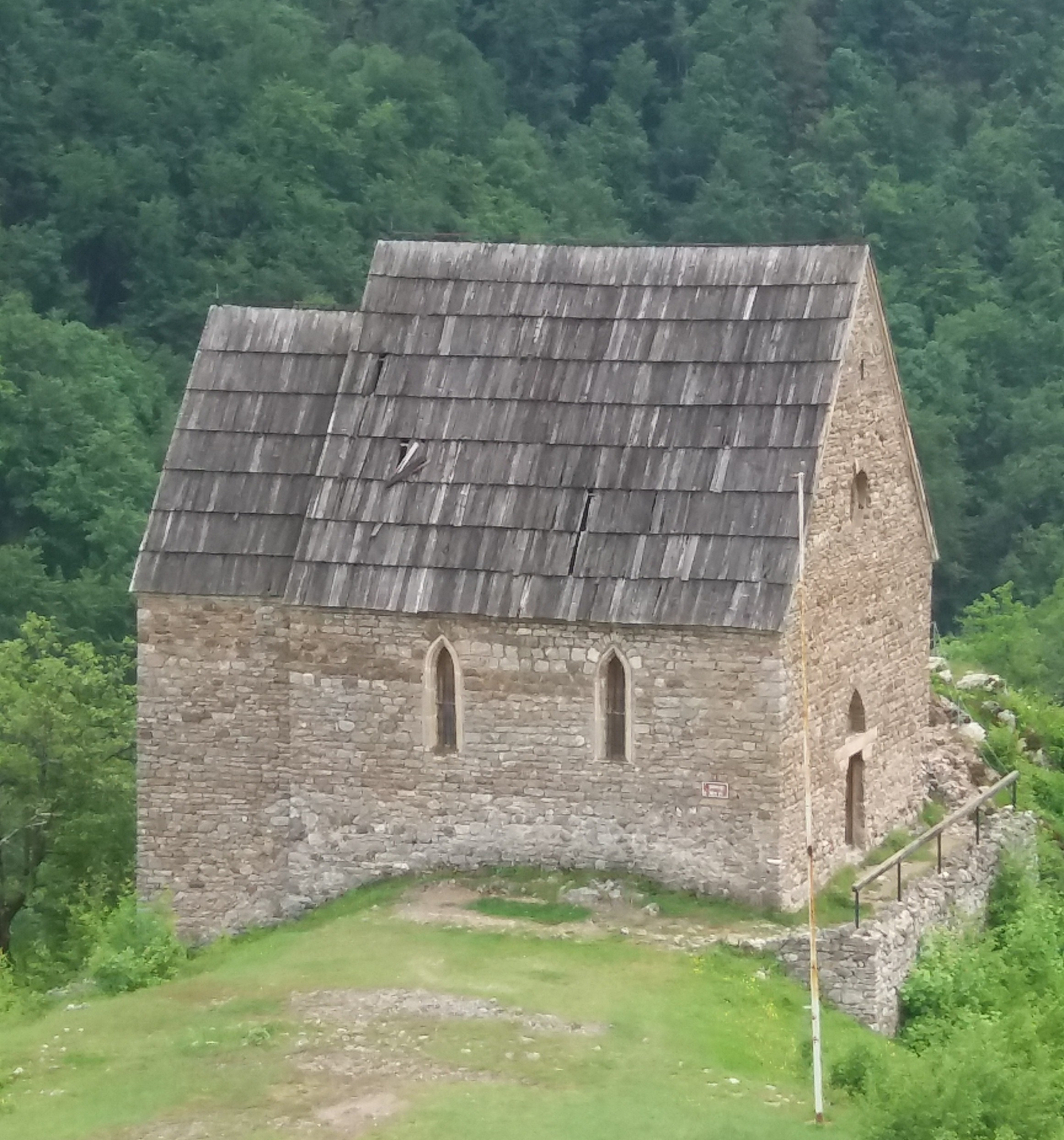
- Picture of restored royal burial chapel at Bobovac, consisting of chapel, mausoleum and burial chamber.

Location
- Coordinates: 44.1379°N 18.2388°E

Site history
- Built: before 1349
- Built by: Stjepan II Kotromanić
- Demolished: 1463
- Battles/wars: 1463

Garrison information
- Designations

KONS of Bosnia and Herzegovina
- Official name: "Mediaeval Royal Castle of Bobovac, the historic site (754)".
- Type: Category 0 historical monument & archaeological site
- Criteria: II. Value - Criteria for designation B, C, D, E, F, G, H i., I.
- Designated: 6 November 2002 (?th session)
- Reference no.: 754
- Decision no.: 01-277/02
- Status: National Monuments of Bosnia and Herzegovina
- Site is protected as National Monument of Bosnia and Herzegovina by the KONS BiH

Bobovac (Serbo-Croatian Cyrillic: Бобовац) is a historic site and the former fortified royal capital city of medieval Bosnia and Herzegovina. It was a seat of Bosnian rulers during 14th and 15th century. It is located near today's Vareš and the village of Borovica, and close to the Royal court in Sutjeska, in the present-day village of Kraljeva Sutjeska. It is a protected national heritage site as a National monument of Bosnia and Herzegovina by KONS.

== History ==
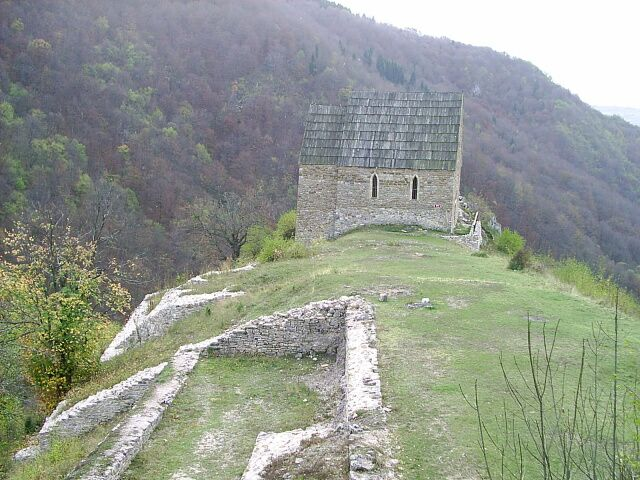
Mausoleum, and buildings remains

The city was built during the reign of Stephen II, Ban of Bosnia, and was first mentioned in a document dating from 1349. It shared the role of seat of the rulers of Bosnia with the court in Sutjeska, or as it called today, Kraljeva Sutjeska, however Bobovac was much better fortified than the other.

Bosnian King Stephen Tomašević moved the royal seat to Jajce during his war with the Ottoman Empire. The Ottomans invaded the city in 1463. Its fall hastened the Ottoman conquest of Bosnia.

== Main structures and architectural style ==
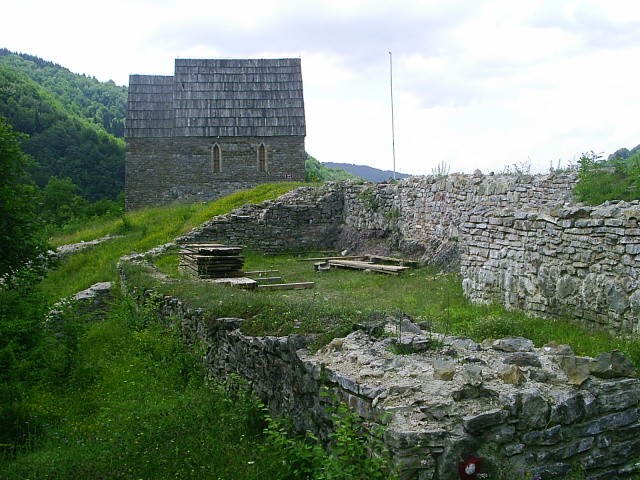
Ruins of Bobovac

Within its main walls' enclosure, the royal town of Bobovac had large residential area, the complex of places of worship with the Burial Chapel for the Bosnian Kings and the Grand Church, the Royal Court complex, separated from the rest of the town with its inner walls and forecourts or courtyards, designed with representative architectural elements in Gothic architectural style. Also, some elements and motifs were designed in Romano-Gothic distyle.

=== Royal Court complex ===
The Royal Court complex was the town's main structure, fitted into five karst ridges on three basic levels, sloping from north to south. This area of Bobovac, separated from the rest of the town with its inner walls, consisted two main gates, two keeps, two forecourts, and three palaces, the Lower or Grand Palace, the Upper Palace, the Annex Palace (annex to the Upper), with other service buildings and staircases.

==== Grand Palace ====
The first Court gate leading into the forecourt, the look-out tower or the keep was situated to the south, with other smaller buildings in the forecourt include a blacksmith shops. A roofed stairway led to the second gate and another forecourt for the Lower Palace or Grand Palace, from assessing the partly preserved walls at least four-story, irregular quadrilateral building with dimensions of 25 meters with 10 meters, whose south wall was erected on top of the limestone ridge while the north wall was entirely formed of a stone cliff. The second gate was done in representative decorative style with a Gothic portal bearing the coat of arms of King Tvrtko II and lanterns. The second forecourt included buildings on three terraces, with a granary, battlements, a large water cistern, a smithy, a lime-pit and one small residential building.

==== Upper Palace with Annex ====
The Upper Palace with its forecourt were situated on the uppermost level, next to the keep and the cistern, with annex to the east as another palace added on later on. The forecourt, which included the keep, led to an elongated the Upper Palace, whose dimensions were 18 to 19 meters with 5 to 5.6 meters.

There were wooden stairs and a gallery to the upper story, while in the northern room an interior vault existed. The room was probably used as a Court chapel for King Tvrtko II’s spouse, Dorothy Garai.

==== Annex Palace ====
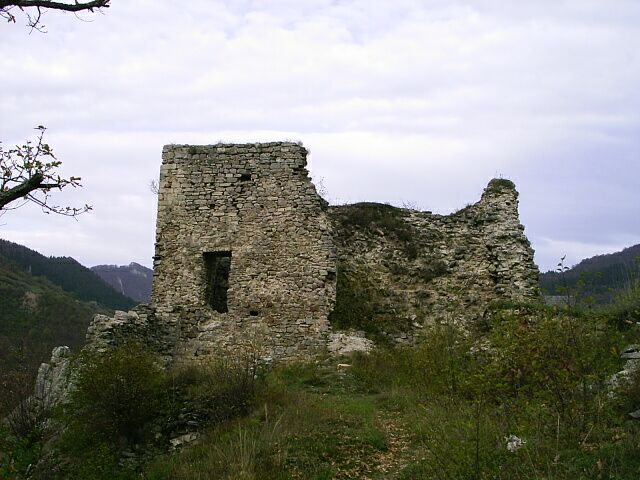
South-westernmost end of the city, above the cliffs over the Bukovica river canyon.

The Annex to the Upper Palace was a two-story building, with dimensions of 18 meters with 6 meters, and abutted against the main building of the Upper Palace on one side, and against the Lower (Grand) Palace on the other. The Annex building consisted of precision metal and wood crafts workshops of court's master craftsman.

=== Complex of places of worship with Burial Chapel and the Grand Church ===
The crown jewels of Bosnia were held in Bobovac. The royal chapel consisted the burial chamber for several Bosnian kings and queens. Nine skeletons have been found in the five tombs located in the mausoleum. The identified skeletons belong to kings Dabiša, Ostoja, Ostojić, Tvrtko II and Thomas. It is assumed that one of the remaining skeletons belongs to the last king, Tomašević, decapitated in Jajce on the order of Mehmed the Conqueror. Only one of the skeletons, found next to that of King Tvrtko II, is female and assumed to belong to Tvrtko II's wife, Queen Dorothy.

== Legacy ==
HKD Napredak releases a monthly magazine called Bobovac. Some scenes of the documentary film, Bosnian Knight, were shot on the location of the fortress. The commemoration of the 25 November, the Statehood Day of Bosnia and Herzegovina, is held in Bobovac six years in a row and becoming a traditional event. Similarly, on every 22 October, the Prayer Day for the Homeland and the pilgrimage of the members of the Armed and Police Forces of Bosnia and Herzegovina is held in Bobovac.
