= List of medieval Bosnian consorts =

Medieval banesses and queens consort of Bosnia

This is a list of women married to the rulers of medieval Bosnia.

== Banesses of Bosnia ==
Name	Portrait	Birth	Marriage(s)	Death
Vojislava			Ban Kulin; 2 children	
Elizabeth of Serbia; 1283–1314		daughter of Stephen Dragutin of Serbia	Stephen I 6 children	c. 1331
Elizabeth of Ortenburg		daughter of Meinhard I of Ortenburg	Stephen II; 2 children	
Unnamed		daughter of Michael Shishman of Bulgaria	Stephen II no children	
Elizabeth of Kuyavia; 1323–1345		daughter of Kazimierz III of Gniewkowo	Stephen II; 2 children	c. 1345
Dorothea of Bulgaria; 1374–1377		daughter of Ivan Sratsimir of Bulgaria	Tvrtko I no children	before 1390

== Queens of Bosnia ==
Name	Portrait	Birth	Marriage(s)	Death
Dorothea of Bulgaria; 1377–1390		daughter of Ivan Sratsimir of Bulgaria	Tvrtko I no children	before 1390
Jelena Gruba; 1391–1395		Nikolić family	Stephen Dabiša one daughter	after March 1399
Vitača; 1398–1399		commoner	Stephen Ostoja no children	
Kujava Radinović; 1399–1404; 1409–1415		daughter of Radin Jablanić	Stephen Ostoja one son	1422
Jelena Nelipčić; 1415–1418		daughter of Ivan Nelipčić	Stephen Ostoja no children	1422
Dorothy Garai; 1428–1438		daughter of John Garai	Tvrtko II no children	1438
Vojača; 1443–1445		commoner	Stephen Thomas four children	
Katarina Kosača; 1446–1461		daughter of Stjepan Vukčić Kosača	Stephen Thomas two children	1478
Maria Branković; 1461–1463		daughter of Lazar Branković	Stephen Tomašević no children	c. 1500

== See also ==
- List of dukes of Bosnia
- List of monarchs of Bosnia
- List of grand dukes of Bosnia
- List of Hungarian consorts, who held the title of Queen of Rama relating to Bosnia
