= Kotromanić dynasty =

Late medieval Bosnian noble (later royal) dynasty

Kotromanić Котроманић
- Coat of arms of King Tvrtko
- Country: Banate of Bosnia; Kingdom of Bosnia; Despotate of Serbia
- Founded: c. 1250
- Founder: Prijezda I
- Final ruler: Stephen Tomašević
- Titles: Ban of Bosnia; King of Bosnia; King of Serbia; King of Croatia; Despot of Serbia
- Dissolution: c. 1500
- Deposition: May 25, 1463; 563 years ago

The House of Kotromanić (Cyrillic: Котроманић, pl. Kotromanići / Котроманићи) was a late medieval Bosnian noble and later royal dynasty. Rising to power in the middle of the 13th century as bans of Bosnia, with control over little more than the valley of the eponymous river, the Kotromanić rulers expanded their realm through a series of conquests to include nearly all of modern-day Bosnia and Herzegovina, large parts of modern-day Croatia and parts of modern-day Serbia and Montenegro, with Tvrtko I eventually establishing the Kingdom of Bosnia in 1377. The Kotromanić intermarried with several southeastern and central European royal houses. The last sovereign, Stephen Tomašević, ruled briefly as Despot of Serbia in 1459 and as King of Bosnia between 1461 and 1463, before losing both countries to the Ottoman Empire.

== Origins ==
The origin of the Kotromanić family is unclear. The earliest mention of the name itself is from 1404, when the officials of the Republic of Ragusa describe the family as being "old nobility". In 1432 Ragusan government mentions a knight called Kotroman the Goth ("Cotromano Gotto") as the forefather of the family. The knight, a relative of the Hungarian king, is said to have come from Hungary and taken possession of the banate of Bosnia. Citing a pre-1430 source, the 16th century Ragusan chronicler Mavro Orbini wrote of a nobleman and warrior Kotroman the German ("Cotromano Tedesco"), appointed ban by the Hungarian monarch after the death of Ban Kulin. (Note: King Stephen III of Hungary did send a German knight to dethrone the Bosnian ruler Borić, his enemy, but the knight was Godfrey of Meissen.) Some later historians, such as Lajos Thallóczy, have rejected the theory of a German origin of the Kotromanić, and instead argued the family was indigenous to Bosnia.

The first Bosnian ruler who is known for certain to have belonged to the Kotromanić family is Prijezda I, a Hungarian vassal. He was somehow related to his predecessor, Matej Ninoslav, and apparently co-ruled with him for some time before becoming sole Ban of Bosnia c. 1250. Europäische Stammtafeln suggests that Prijezda and Ninoslav were first cousins, fathered by different sons of a certain Kotroman (Cotromanus). The noblemen Radonja and Ugrin, who witnessed a charter issued by Ninoslav, are also suggested to be Kotroman's grandsons, brothers of Ninoslav.

== Rulers of the Kotromanići ==
*The order of succession below excludes those not a Kotromanić by birth.

Kotromanići

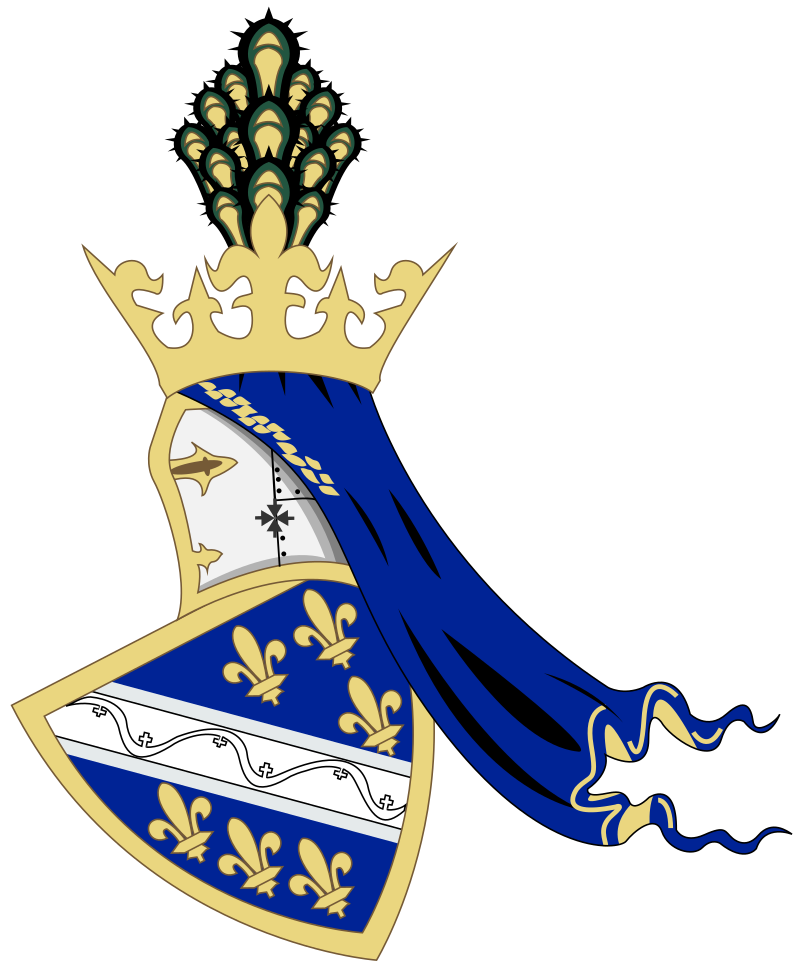
House of Kotromanić
Prijezda I Ban of Bosnia r. c. 1250-1287; 1211-1287
Prijezda II; Ban of Bosnia r. 1287-1290; 1233-1290
Stjepan I Ban of Bosnia r. 1290-1314 c. 1242-1314
Stjepan II; Ban of Bosnia; Lord of Hum r. 1314-1353 c. 1300s-1353
Tvrtko the Great; King of Bosnia; King of Croatia r. 1353-1377; 1338-1391
Dabiša of Bosnia; King of Bosnia r. 1391-1395 ?-1395
Ostoja of Bosnia; King of Bosnia r. 1398-1404, 1409-1418 ?-1418
Stjepan III; King of Bosnia r. 1418-1420 c. 1400-1421
Tvrtko II; King of Bosnia r. 1404-1409, 1420-1443 c. 1380-1443
Tomaš of Bosnia; King of Bosnia; Despot of Serbia r. 1443-1461 c. 1411-1461
Stjepan IV; King of Bosnia r. 1461-1463; 1438-1463

== History ==
=== Consolidation and rise ===
Prijezda I's realm was significantly smaller than Ninoslav's, the northern regions of Usora and Soli having been detached by the Hungarian crown. In 1284 this contiguous territory was granted to King Ladislaus IV of Hungary's brother-in-law, the deposed Serbian king Dragutin. The same year Prijezda arranged the marriage of his son, Stephen I, with Dragutin's daughter Elizabeth. The marriage had great consequences in the subsequent centuries, when Stephen and Elizabeth's Kotromanić descendants claimed the throne of Serbia.

Besides Stephen I, Prijezda I had two more sons, Prijezda II and Vuk, and a daughter who married into the Slavonian ruling Babonić family. Vuk is not mentioned after Prijezda I's death in 1287, which saw the accession of Prijezda II and Stephen I. Prijezda II is not mentioned thereafter, while Stephen I's rule over Bosnia was challenged by the Šubić rulers of Dalmatia, who succeeded in subjugating nearly all of Bosnia by the early 14th century.

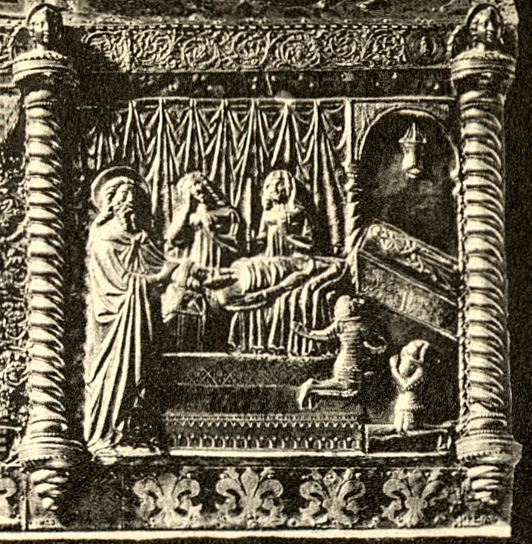
Deathbed of Stephen II, attended by his daughter Elizabeth, sister-in-law Jelena and nephews Tvrtko and Vuk

By 1314 Stephen had been succeeded by Stephen II, his eldest son by Elizabeth. She was ousted from Bosnia in 1314 and took refuge in Ragusa with her and Stephen I's children: Stephen II, Vladislav, Ninoslav (who died young) and Catherine (who married into the Nemanjić family of Zachlumia). Stephen II and Vladislav managed to reassert the family's hold on Bosnia, defeating the Šubić family in 1322. In the course of his reign Stephen II expanded the Kotromanić realm to its farthest limits thus far ("from the Sava to the seaside and from the Cetina to the Drina"), doubling Bosnia's territory. He was married two or three times: to a Bulgarian princess, to Elizabeth of Kuyavia, and possibly (firstly) to a daughter of Meinhard I of Ortenburg. He left two daughters: Elizabeth and Catherine. Elizabeth's marriage to King Louis I of Hungary in 1353 elevated the Kotromanić dynasty and was the most prestigious union in its history. Catherine's marriage to Count Hermann I of Celje was also of dynastic significance; the couple's son, Hermann II, was recognized as heir presumptive to the Bosnian throne in 1427, and through him the Kotromanić dynasty is ancestral to the presently reigning European kings and queens.

=== Kingship ===
Stephen II died in September 1353. His brother Vladislav was excluded from the succession for reasons unknown, and Stephen was succeeded directly by Tvrtko I, Vladislav's son by Jelena Šubić. Tvrtko initially lost a significant part of his patrimony to Louis, supposedly promised as Elizabeth's dowry, and was briefly deposed in 1365-66 in favour of his younger brother, Vuk. Upon restoration, however, Tvrtko's power steadily increased. He conquered some remnants of the Serbian Empire and, citing his descent from Serbia's extinct Nemanjić dynasty through his grandmother Elizabeth, had himself crowned king in 1377. He then proceeded to conquer large parts of Slavonia, Dalmatia and Croatia proper. Having established Bosnia as a kingdom and brought it to its largest extent in history, Tvrtko called himself "by the Grace of God King of Rascia, Bosnia, Dalmatia, Croatia, and Pomorje". After the death of his first wife, Dorothea of Bulgaria, Tvrtko was negotiating a marital alliance into the rising Austrian Habsburg family, but the plan never materialized due to his death on 10 March 1391.

The royal authority weakened after Tvrtko I's death but the stanak, the assembly of Bosnian noblemen, consistently elected members of the Kotromanić family to the throne. Tvrtko's successor, Dabiša (r. 1391–1395), likely an illegitimate brother or possibly a cousin, recognized as his heir the Hungarian king Sigismund, son-in-law of Stephen II's daughter Elizabeth. The Bosnian nobility refused to accept Sigismund as their king upon Dabiša's death on 8 September 1395, and instead elected Dabiša's widow, Helen (Gruba). Dabiša and his wife had a daughter, Stana, who left further issue.

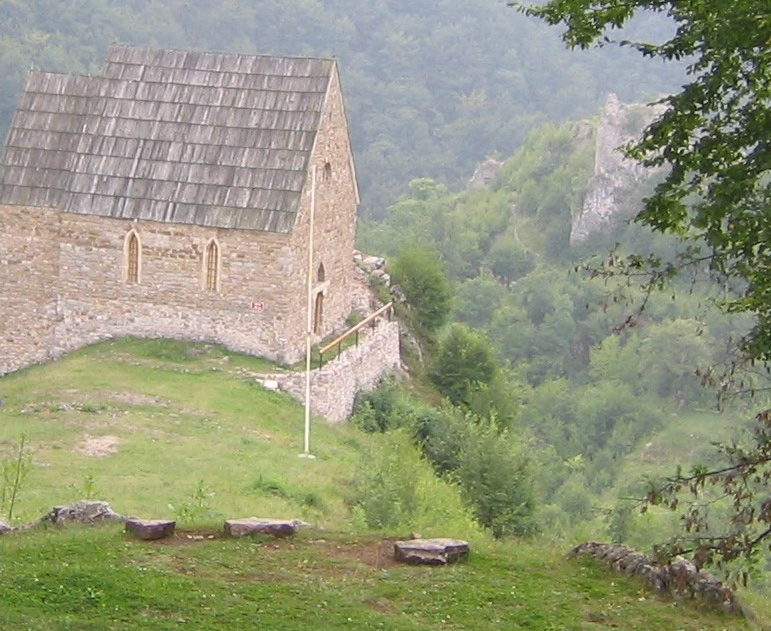
A reconstructed chapel in Bobovac which housed a burial vault of the Kotromanić royal family

In April 1398 Helen was dethroned in favour of Ostoja (r. 1398–1404, 1409-1418). Documents often identify him as Ostoja Kristić, which led early historians (including Orbini) to claim that he was not a Kotromanić. It has become accepted, and corroborated by historical documents, that the Kristići were a cadet branch of the Kotromanić family. Ostoja himself emphasised he derived his right to the Bosnian crown from his royal parentage. He immediately repudiated his commoner wife, Vitača, and married Kujava Radinović, a member of a Bosnian noble family. His relationship with the magnates, primarily Hrvoje Vukčić Hrvatinić and Sandalj Hranić Kosača, fluctuated. In 1404 Ostoja was dethroned by the magnates and replaced with Tvrtko II, a son of Tvrtko I whose legitimacy is disputed. Tvrtko reigned as a puppet king until Ostoja was reinstated in 1409. A violet conflict with his in-laws in 1415 led Ostoja to repudiate Kujava too. His third wife, Jelena Nelipčić, brought a considerable part of the Hrvatinić land to the Kotromanić royal domain in 1416. Ostoja died in 1418, leaving a legitimate son by Kujava, Stephen Ostojić (r. 1418–1420), who succeeded him, and two illegitimate sons, Radivoj and Thomas.

Tvrtko II (r. 1420–1443) deposed Stephen Ostojić in 1420, and the latter appears to have died in exile soon afterwards. In 1424 Tvrtko's position was briefly threatened by a relative named Vuk Banić, interpreted either as a grandson (through a daughter called Grubača) or as another illegitimate son of Tvrtko I. Another contender, from 1433 until 1435, was Ostoja's illegitimate son, Radivoj, who enjoyed the support of the Ottoman Empire. Despite these claimants, Tvrtko II considerably restored the royal dignity and strengthened Bosnian economy. In 1427 he settled the succession on the Hungarian nobleman Hermann II of Celje, son of Hermann I and Catherine of Bosnia, and the following year married the Hungarian noblewoman Dorothy Garai. Having reigned as king longer than any other Kotromanić, the widowed Tvrtko II died childless in 1443. He had outlived Hermann, whose son Frederick had no support in Bosnia; Tvrtko himself appears to have favored Ostoja's younger illegitimate son, Thomas, as his heir.

=== Last decades ===
The election of Thomas (r. 1443–1461) to the Bosnian throne was not accepted by Stjepan Vukčić Kosača, the magnate who supported Radivoj. The conflict was resolved in 1446 by the marriage of Thomas, recently separated from a commoner named Vojača, and Kosača's daughter Catherine, while Radivoj received an appanage and married the Hungarian noblewoman Catherine of Velika. In addition to Stephen Tomašević, a son from his first marriage, Thomas had two more children by his second wife, Sigismund and Catherine. His reign saw an increase in hostilities with the neighbouring Despotate of Serbia and with the Ottomans. The former ended in 1459 when Thomas arranged the marriage of his elder son, Stephen, with Helen, eldest daughter of the recently deceased Serbian despot Lazar. Stephen thus became the new Despot of Serbia. His reign in Serbia lasted two months, ending when the despotate was conquered by the Ottomans.

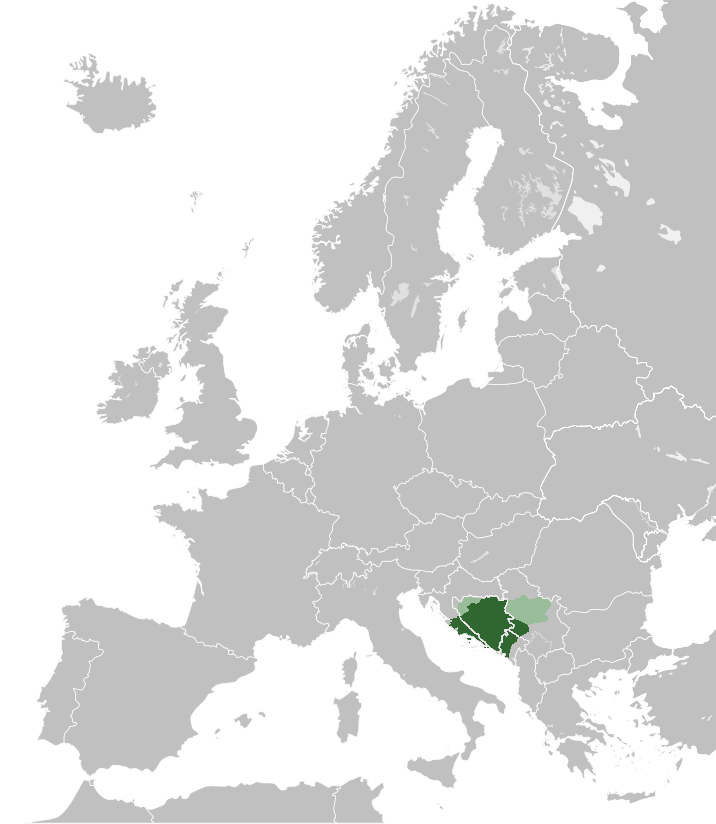
All lands ruled by the royal Kotromanić Dynasty (Light green temporary: Parts of Donji Kraji and Serbian Despotate under Stjepan Tomašević)

Stephen (r. 1461–1463) became King of Bosnia upon his father upon the latter's death in 1461. His reign in Bosnia too was cut short by an Ottoman invasion in the spring of 1463. The Kotromanić family dispersed, attempting to escape capture by fleeing in different directions. Stephen was captured, however, as was Radivoj and Radivoj's adolescent son Tvrtko. All three were decapitated in the presence of Mehmed the Conqueror at the end of May. The widows of King Thomas, King Stephen and Radivoj escaped, but Stephen's siblings were taken prisoners. Another son of Radivoj, Matthias, functioned as the Ottoman puppet-king of Bosnia (with authority over only the valley of the Lašva) from 1465 until 1471. Sigismund, son of King Thomas, became an Ottoman statesman and sanjak-bey under the name Ishak Bey Kraloğlu. He is last mentioned in 1492.

== Demesne ==
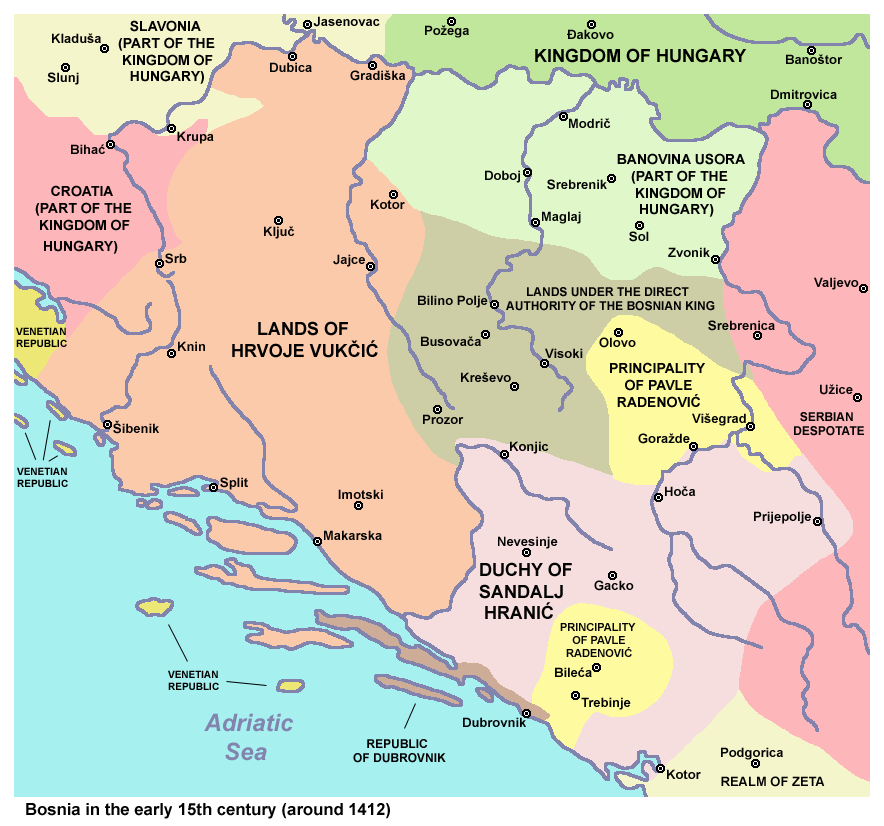
Kotromanić demesne c. 1412 in olive green, surrounded by lands of the family's vassals

The demesne of the Kotromanić family was, for the most part, located in central Bosnia, including towns and mines such as Visoko, Bobovac, Sutjeska, Fojnica and Kreševo. From 1416 their demesne also included land formerly ruled by the Hrvatinić family, most notably Jajce, which was the dynasty's last seat.

== Religion ==
Most of the Kotromanić rulers were Roman Catholics, but were entirely indifferent to the other two denominations widespread in their realm, namely the Bosnian Church and (in Humska zemlja) the Eastern Orthodox Church. They also contracted marriages with adherents of all three churches. Ban Stephen II appears to have been Orthodox (like his mother) until 1347 at most, by which time he had converted to Catholicism. Ostoja belonged to the Bosnian Church, as did his sons. Thomas joined the Catholic Church, presumably having left the Bosnian, shortly after becoming king.

Despite the nominal adherence of the family to Catholicism, the faith became important only to the last two Kotromanić kings, Thomas and his son Stephen. Thomas was the first in the dynasty to engage in religious persecution, following pressure from the Holy See. Stephen, on the other hand, was the first (and ultimately only) king whose coronation received papal blessing. The last known generation of the family, Thomas' son Sigismund and daughter Catherine, converted to Islam some years after their capture by the Ottomans.

== See also ==
- List of rulers of Bosnia
