= Radivoj of Bosnia =

Radivoj

anti-king of Bosnia
- Period: 1432–1435, 1443–1446
- Died: late May or early June 1463; Ključ or Jajce
- Spouse: Catherine of Velika
- Issue: Tvrtko, George, Matthias, King of Bosnia
- House: House of Kotromanić
- Father: Ostoja, King of Bosnia
- Religion: Roman Catholic Church prev. Bosnian Church

Radivoj of Bosnia (Serbo-Croatian: Radivoj Ostojić/Радивој Остојић; died in late May or early June 1463) was anti-king of Bosnia from 1432 until 1435, when he lost all control over the kingdom but did not relinquish the title, and again from 1443 until 1446, when he abandoned his claim. He was recognized as king by the Ottoman Empire and the Despotate of Serbia, as well as by the Bosnian noble houses of Kosača and Pavlović, but never by the West. Radivoj is thus seldom included in the list of rulers of Bosnia.

== Background ==
Radivoj was the older of the two illegitimate sons of King Ostoja. He was most likely born before 1410, during Ostoja's marriage to Kujava Radinović, the mother of the King's only legitimate son, Stephen Ostojić. Like his younger brother Thomas, Radivoj was a doubly adulterine child, as his father confessed to the pope that their mother too had a living husband at the time of their births. The surname Kristić (or Krstić or Hrstić), which was often appended to his name, was most likely derived from his mother's family name. The depiction of the Kristić coat of arms, presented in the form of Hcarstictc, can also be found in the famous Fojnica Armory. It consists of a shield divided vertically into red and black colours, each containing an image of a church and a black lily. Upon Ostoja's death in September 1418, Radivoj's older half-brother Stephen ascended the throne, but was deposed by their father's nephew and rival Tvrtko II in 1421, dying soon afterwards.

== Anti-king ==
Radivoj started claiming the crown in 1428, but did not become a serious pretender until the First Konavle War in 1430, when the Ottomans lent him their support. Radivoj is first mentioned in historical sources in October 1431, when his envoys were in Dubrovnik. The following year, the Burgundian spy Bertrandon de la Broquière found him at the Sublime Porte asking Murad II for help in his bid to the throne. The Despot of Serbia Đurađ Branković and Bosnia's most powerful noblemen, Sandalj of the House of Kosača and Radoslav of the House of Pavlović, also rallied to support Radivoj.

By 1433, Radivoj controlled most of the kingdom, with Tvrtko being reduced to its central and northwestern parts. Đurađ and the noblemen eventually lost interest in Radivoj, but the Ottomans persisted and took possession of Bobovac in his name in 1434. The Hungarians restored Jajce, Hodidjed, Bočac and the Komotin Castle to Tvrtko in mid-1434, but lost it all again to Radivoj as soon as they retreated, and appears to have followed them out of Bosnia. This made Radivoj the de facto King of Bosnia, but he was not recognized as legitimate monarch by any Christian state. Radivoj's fortunes overturned, however, when the Ottomans ceased supporting him in 1435, and he fled to the Kosača court in Zachlumia in the spring of 1435. Tvrtko seized the opportunity and, again with Hungarian help, reestablished himself in the kingdom. Radivoj continued styling himself king of Bosnia for the remainder of Tvrtko II's reign, but without any recognition.

The death of the childless Tvrtko II in November 1443 opened a new possibility for Radivoj, who was at that time residing at the court of Sandalj's nephew and successor, Stjepan Vukčić Kosača. Tvrtko, however, had specifically intended to exclude Radivoj from succession, and appears to have designated Radivoj's younger brother Thomas as his heir. Thomas was elected king by a majority of the nobility despite Radivoj's attempts in Ragusa to prevent his brother's recognition as heir. A pro-Ottoman faction led by Stjepan, who did not take part in the election, declared for Radivoj. A war was waged until 1446, and it ended with Thomas being acknowledged as king by all the noblemen and by Radivoj himself. Radivoj was granted appanage by his brother, including the fortresses of Vranduk near Doboj, Sokol near Gračanica and Komotin near Jajce.

== King's brother ==
The earliest information about Radivoj's religious orientation comes from a charter of Pope Eugene IV from the first half of October 1446, when Radivoj was accepted under the protection of the Roman Church. With this move, Radivoj publicly expressed his religious allegiance to the Catholic Church. In June 1449, Radivoj married Catherine, the second of the three daughters of the Hungarian nobleman Nicholas of Velika, who had no sons. An inheritance pact was signed between the men on 19 June, establishing that the marriage would be contracted according to Roman Catholic rite and that the couple would inherit a third of Nicholas' Slavonian and Hungarian possessions after he and his wife Margaret die. Radivoj, in turn, gave half of his estates in Bosnia and Slavonia to his parents-in-law. Katarina and Radivoj certainly did not have children by 1461. This is evidenced by a charter issued by King Stephen Tomašević to Radivoj in September 1461, which states that certain estates would be left to Katarina after Radivoj's death if they did not have any common descendants. However, he was certainly married earlier. Less than two years after his marriage to Katarina, in April 1451, Radivoj's son Tvrtko appeared in Dubrovnik, and on this occasion, he was given a gift. At this time, Radivoj had another son. In March 1452, the authorities of Dubrovnik granted gifts to his unnamed sons and provided them with a response to their requests. Radivoj's other son was Juraj. He, along with his brother Tvrtko, stayed in Dubrovnik in mid-June 1453. It is clear that George was already an adult at this time. Radivoj's other son was Juraj. He, along with his brother Tvrtko, stayed in Dubrovnik in mid-June 1453. It is clear that George was already an adult at this time.

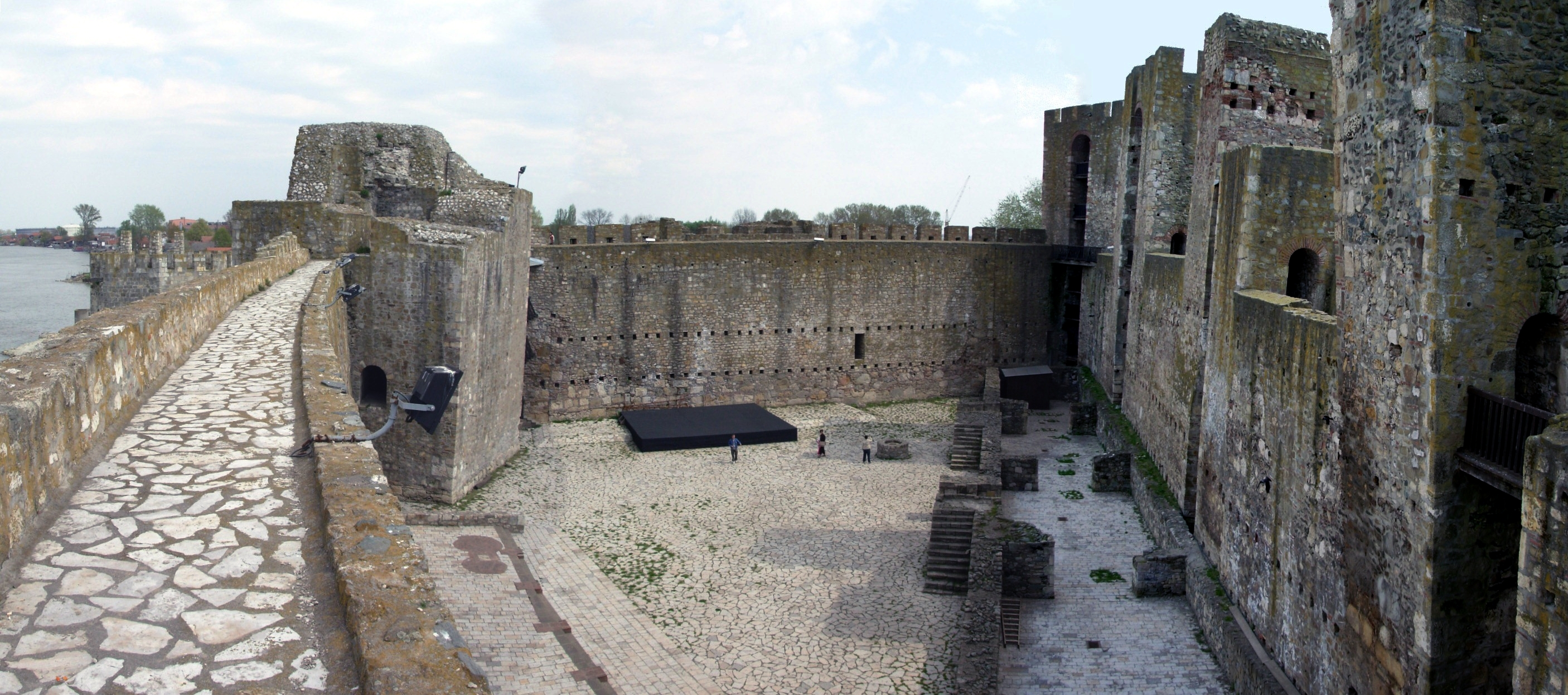
Smederevo Fortress

Radivoj spent the remainder of Thomas' reign peacefully and aiding his brother when necessary. In 1458, he took part in the negotiations with the Hungarian king Matthias Corvinus and the Serbian despoina Helena Palaiologina regarding the marriage of his nephew Stephen Tomašević and Helena's daughter Helena. King Thomas' sent Radivoj to Hungary as an envoy in October. In January the following year, Radivoj accompanied his nephew to the session of the Diet of Hungary in Buda, and two months later to Smederevo, where Stephen married Helena and became the new despot. In June, however, the Ottomans army attacked Serbia and approached the Smederevo Fortress. No attempt to defend it was made, and Radivoj negotiated surrender and safe conduct of the royal family. The King of Hungary accused Radivoj and Thomas of betrayal and selling the fortress to the Ottomans, "damaging the Christendom", and confiscated the estates Radivoj held in his kingdoms. Matthias circulated the allegation throughout Europe, while Thomas made great effort to deny it. He sent emissaries to Mantua, where they were received by Pope Pius II on 10 July before Matthias's accusation reached him. Radivoj was probably one of the envoys, as the Pope took the opportunity to address a request he made regarding private worship.

== Last years ==
The death of King Thomas in July 1461 was shrouded in rumours of foul play by his brother and son, likely unsubstantiated and fabricated. Radivoj's relationship with his nephew, the new king, was cordial. A charter of questionable authenticity, in Bosnian language, was allegedly issued by Stephen on 18 September, confirming all of Radivoj's fortresses and other holdings in the kingdom for his "faithful and true services to the crown". Stephen's reign was brief; he tactlessly provoked an Ottoman attack which put an end to Bosnia's independence in May 1463. Radivoj accompanied him in his attempt to escape to Croatia, but they were captured by Mehmed the Conqueror's army in Ključ, shortly after Ragusan authorities decided to send him gunpowder. Radivoj was executed on spot or along with Stephen at Mehmed's camp near Jajce shortly afterwards. Radivoj's 13-year-old son Tvrtko was executed alongside him. His widow escaped to Dalmatia and remarried, while his son Matthias was for a while a puppet king installed by the Ottomans.

Radivoj of Bosnia Kotromanić dynasty Died: June 1463
Royal titles
Preceded by Tvrtko II as recognized king	— DISPUTED — King of Bosnia; 1432–1435; Disputed by Tvrtko II	Succeeded by Tvrtko II as recognized king
Preceded by Tvrtko II as recognized king	— DISPUTED — King of Bosnia; 1443-1446; Disputed by Thomas	Succeeded by Thomas as recognized king
