= Matija Sabančić =

Titular king of Bosnia

Matija Sabančić or Matija Šabančić (Note: His given name was Matija (rendered "Matthew" or "Matthias"), and his byname was Sabančić (as he signed himself in 1471). His patronymic was Radivojević (in a 1467 document, he is mentioned as "Matija, son of Radivoj"). Vladimir Ćorović used the name Matija Šabančić (Матија Шабанчић), while Miroslav Krleža used Matija Sabančić Radivojević.) (fl. 1463–71) was the titular King of Bosnia in the period of 1465–1471, as the first of two Ottoman-installed puppets in Bosnia. He was one of the last known members of the Kotromanić dynasty.

== Life ==
Sabančić was one of three sons of anti-king Radivoj of Bosnia (1432–1435), an illegitimate son of King Ostoja (r. 1398–1404, 1409–1418), and Catherine, daughter of Nicholas of Velika, who married in 1449. His father unsuccessfully claimed the crown of Bosnia between 1432 and 1435. Matthias' brothers were Tvrtko (d. 1463) and George (fl. 1455).

In 1463, Sabančić's father, brother Tvrtko and first cousin, King Stephen Tomašević, were executed on the order of the Ottoman Sultan Mehmed II, while the Kingdom of Bosnia was annexed to the Ottoman Empire. In the last months of 1465, Mehmed the Conqueror named Sabančić King of Bosnia. However, Sabančić gained little more than the title, as the actual kingdom was defunct. His "realm" was probably Lašva Valley. The only sources that mention him are those of the Republic of Ragusa and are related to his granting favours.

Sabančić was last mentioned in 1471. The second Ottoman puppet in Bosnia was Matija Vojsalić, installed in March or April 1476, while at the same time King Matthias Corvinus of Hungary named Nicholas of Ilok as the Hungarian puppet King of Bosnia.

== Annotations ==
Matija Sabančić Kotromanić dynasty
Vacant Title last held by Stephen Tomašević as sovereign	— TITULAR — King of Bosnia; 1465–1471	Succeeded by Matija Vojsalić
