= List of rulers of medieval Bosnia =

This is a list of monarchs of Bosnia, containing bans and kings of medieval Bosnia; Bosnia (early medieval), Banate of Bosnia, Kingdom of Bosnia.

== Duke (1084–1095) ==
Picture	Name	House	Reign	Overlordship	Notes
	Stephen	Vojislavljević	fl. 1084–1095	Constantine Bodin Duklja	According to the semi-mythical Chronicle of the Priest of Duklja (late 13–14th century), appointed ruler of Bosnia sometime between 1083 and 1084 by King Constantine Bodin of Duklja.

== Bans (1154–1377) ==
Picture	Name	House	Reign	Overlordship	Notes
Conquered by Béla II of Hungary in 1136; Ladislaus II of Hungary first held the title Duke of Bosnia 1137–1154
	Borić	Boričević	1154–1163	Beloš (1154–1158); Géza II (1158–1162); Stephen IV (1162–1163) Hungary	
1167: Bosnia claimed by the Byzantine Empire
1180s: Bosnia claimed by the Kingdom of Hungary
	Kulin	Kulinić	1180–1204	Manuel I Comnenus (1180–1183); Byzantine Emeric I (1183–1204); Hungary	
	Stephen	Kulinić	1204–1232		
	Matej Ninoslav		1232–1253		
	Prijezda I	Kotromanić	1254–1287	Michael of Bosnia (1262–1266); Béla of Macsó (1266–1272); Stephen Gutkeled (1272–1273)	
	Prijezda II	Kotromanić	1287–1290		
	Stephen I	Kotromanić	1287–1314		In 1299, Paul I Šubić of Bribir took the title "lord of Bosnia" (Bosniae dominus) and named his brother Mladen I Šubić of Bribir as the Bosnian ban. From 1299 until 1304 Mladen I was at war with Stephen I.
	Paul	Šubić	1305–1312		In 1305, Paul I Šubić took the title "lord of Bosnia" (Bosniae dominus).
	Mladen II	Šubić	1312–1322		Paul's eldest son Mladen II Šubić of Bribir was Lord of Bosnia from 1312 to 1322. In 1314, Mladen II appoints Stephen II Kotromanić, his former enemy, as vassal in Bosnia.
	Stephen II	Kotromanić	1322–1353		
	Tvrtko I	Kotromanić	1353–1366		
	Vuk	Kotromanić	1366–1367		
	Tvrtko I	Kotromanić	1367–1377		

== Kings and queen (1377–1463) ==
All Bosnian kings added the honorific Stephen to their baptismal name upon accession.

Name	Portrait	Birth	Marriage(s)	Death
Tvrtko I 26 October 1377 – 10 March 1391		1338 son of Vladislav Kotromanić and Jelena Šubić	Dorothea of Bulgaria; Ilinci; 8 December 1374 no children	10 March 1391 aged 53
Dabiša; 10 March 1391 – 8 September 1395		after 1339 illegitimate son of Vladislav Kotromanić	Jelena Gruba one daughter	8 September 1395; Kraljeva Sutjeska
Jelena Gruba; 8 September 1395 – 1398		born to the House of Nikolić	Dabiša one daughter	after 1399
Stephen Ostoja; 1398–1404; 1409–1418		illegitimate son of Vladislav Kotromanić or Tvrtko I	(1) Vitača no children (2) Kujava Radinović one son (3) Jelena Nelipić no children	after 23 March 1418
Stephen Ostojić; 1418–1420		son of Stephen Ostoja and Kujava Radinović	never married	1421
Tvrtko II; 1404–1409; 1420 – November 1443		illegitimate son of Tvrtko I	Dorothy Garai no children	November 1443
Radivoj anti-king 1432–1435		illegitimate son of Stephen Ostoja	Catherine of Velika three sons	June 1463
Stephen Thomas; 1443 – 10 July 1461		illegitimate son of Stephen Ostoja	(1) Vojača one son (2) Katarina Kosača two children	10 July 1461
Stephen Tomašević; 10 July 1461 – 5 June 1463		son of Stephen Thomas and Vojača	Jelena Branković; Smederevo; 1 April 1459 no children	5 June 1463 beheaded

=== Pretenders and titular kings ===
Nominal
Nicholas of Ilok	House of Ilok	"King of Bosnia" (1471–1477)	appointed by the King of Hungary
Matija Sabančić	House of Kotromanić	"King of Bosnia" (1465–1471)	son of Radivoj of Bosnia, appointed by the Sultan
Matija Vojsalić	House of Hrvatinić	"King of Ottoman Bosnia" (1472–1476)	appointed by the Sultan, removed for conspiring against the Ottomans

== See also ==
- List of medieval Bosnian consorts
- List of Bosnian dukes
- List of grand dukes of Bosnia
- High Representative for Bosnia and Herzegovina
