= Thomas of Bosnia =

Bosnian king

Thomas

King of Bosnia
- Reign: November 1443 – July 1461
- Predecessor: Tvrtko II Tvrtković
- Successor: Stephen II Tomašević
- Born: c. 1411
- Died: July 1461
- Burial: Bobovac
- Spouse: Vojača; Catherine of Bosnia
- Issue more...: Stephen II, King of Bosnia; Ishak-bey Kraloglu; Catherine
- House: Kotromanić
- Father: Ostoja, King of Bosnia
- Religion: Roman Catholic previously Bosnian Christian

Stephen Thomas (Serbo-Croatian: Stefan Tomaš/Стефан Томаш, Stjepan Tomaš/Стјепан Томаш; c. 1411 – July 1461), a member of the House of Kotromanić, reigned from 1443 until his death as the penultimate king of Bosnia.

An illegitimate son of King Ostoja, Thomas succeeded King Tvrtko II, but his accession was not recognized by the leading magnate of the Kingdom of Bosnia, Stjepan Vukčić Kosača. The two engaged in a civil war which ended when the King repudiated his wife, Vojača, and married the insubordinate nobleman's daughter, Catherine. Thomas and his second wife, both raised in the Bosnian Church tradition, converted to Roman Catholicism and sponsored construction of churches and monasteries throughout the kingdom.

Throughout his reign, Thomas waged a war with the Serbian Despotate over the lucrative mining town of Srebrenica and its surroundings, in addition to (or in conjunction with) multiple conflicts with his father-in-law. Moreover, he had a tense relationship with the menacing Ottoman Empire. After years of skirmishes and raids, Thomas appeared willing to lead the Christian coalition against the Turks, but received no assistance from fellow Christian rulers. Having failed to expand into Croatia proper, Thomas turned again to the east in 1458, arranging a match between his son Stephen and the Serbian heiress Helena. Bosnian control over the remnants of the Serbian Despotate lasted merely a month before the Ottoman conquest of the state. King Thomas' failure to defend Serbia permanently damaged his reputation in Europe. Wishing to improve his image among Europe's Catholics, Thomas turned against the Bosnian Church, thus becoming the first ruler of Bosnia to engage in religious persecution.

Thomas' sometime contradictory traits earned him both admiration and scorn from his contemporaries. His son Stephen succeeded him, and immediately proved more apt at dealing with the challenges of the time.

== Background ==
Thomas was the son of King Ostoja, who died in 1418, and his mistress, whose name is not recorded. He was a doubly adulterine child, as both his father and mother were married at the time of his birth. Thomas was raised as a member of the Bosnian Church, to which his parents adhered. Tvrtko II deposed Stephen Ostojić, Ostoja's only known legitimate child and successor, in 1421. Thomas' illegitimate older brother, Radivoj, unsuccessfully contested Tvrtko's rule with the help of the Ottoman Turks and the Kosača family, the leading magnates of the Kingdom of Bosnia.

The narrative sources refer to Thomas (as well as his father and brother) as a Kristić, which is thought to be the name of a cadet branch of the Kotromanić dynasty. Thomas was thus closely related to Tvrtko II, likely his first cousin. (Note: In a charter issued upon his accession, Thomas described Tvrtko II as his patruus, a Latin word that means "paternal uncle" if used as a noun, but "paternal uncle's son" if used as an adjective. The uncertainty is somewhat clarified by Ostoja's charters in which he referred to Tvrtko I, Tvrtko II's father, as his "late brother". The historian Dominik Mandić notes that, while cousins sometimes addressed each other as brothers, it would have been highly unusual for a person to describe his or her father as brother. Mandić thus concludes that Thomas was a patrilineal first cousin of Tvrtko II.)

Avoiding the limelight during the reign of Tvrtko II, Thomas lived with a commoner named Vojača and their children. He was loyal to King Tvrtko, and together the two took part in a skirmish in Usora, where Thomas was wounded. His loyalty likely influenced the childless and ailing King to ensure his succession; Thomas was certainly preferable to his brother Radivoj, whom Tvrtko detested. Count Hermann II of Celje, a descendant of the Kotromanić family once designated as heir presumptive, had died in 1435.

== Accession to coronation ==
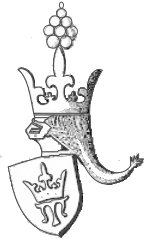
Reproduction of King Stephen Thomas coat of arms, with his monogram on shield and royal crown

Tvrtko II died in November 1443. The Stanak approved his choice of heir, and Thomas was duly elected king by 5 December. Like his predecessors, he added the royal name Stephen to his own. However, the kingdom's most powerful magnate, Grand Duke Stjepan Vukčić Kosača, refused to accept Thomas as king, and announced his support for Radivoj. The authorities of the neighbouring Republic of Ragusa immediately expressed concern about the situation. Kosača and Radivoj appealed to Ragusa not to recognize Thomas as king, but to no avail. Simultaneously, Hermann's grandson Ulrich II pressed his claim to the Bosnian throne and tried to gather support among Thomas's opponents. Because of this, Thomas hastened to send word of his accession to foreign rulers, including the German king Frederick IV, Ulrich's rival, and Ragusan and Venetian authorities, hoping to receive recognition. Ulrich was occupied with the feud waged against him by Frederick, as well as with the succession struggle in Hungary, where he had taken side with his cousin, queen dowager Elizabeth of Luxembourg and her infant son Ladislaus against the reigning monarch Vladislav I, leaving Thomas ample space of maneuver.

=== Succession war ===
King Thomas acted resolutely to strengthen his position. In January 1444, he penetrated the Bosnian-held region of Zachlumia, ruled by the Kosačas. Kosača's nephew Ivaniš Pavlović accompanied him, and the Radivojević family, the discontented vassals of the Kosačas, joined them upon their arrival. The party soon took Drijeva, thus restoring the important customs town to the royal domain for the first time in three decades. Pressed by his simultaneous war with Venice, and receiving no help from the Ottoman Turks, Kosača agreed to a truce in March. Both sides hoped to buy time to regain strength for future clashes. King Thomas tried to exact the promise of help from Venice in the event of a Hungarian offensive against him, even offering 25-year-long control over some of his towns and mines to the Republic in return. However, throughout May successful negotiations with Hungary rendered this cession unnecessary. János Hunyadi's intercession with King Vladislaus I led to Hungarian recognition of Thomas in June, for which the grateful King of Bosnia promised Hunyadi free passage, shelter, an annual income and assistance in any matter. Thus, by summer, Thomas had secured his grip on the throne.

In July 1444, the Hungarian king informed Thomas of his intention to break the truce with the Ottomans. King Thomas decided to make the best of his membership in the Christian coalition. In May he had already conquered the lucrative silver mining town of Srebrenica, taken by the Ottomans from the Serbian Despotate, which in turn had taken it from Bosnia. He now decided to resume his war against the rebellious Kosača, an Ottoman tributary. The Turks were now ready to assist the Duke and broke into Bosnia, forcing the King to flee from Kozograd to Bobovac, and enabling Kosača to reverse all his losses. In August, the Ottomans restored Serbia to Đurađ Branković, who allied with Kosača against King Thomas. The destruction of the Hungarian army in November 1444 at the Battle of Varna, where King Vladislaus himself perished, left Thomas vulnerable. Forced again to rely solely on Venice, Thomas repeated his earlier offer, but the Republic declined and made peace with Kosača. In April 1445, Thomas lost Srebrenica and the entire Drina Valley to Branković. Ivaniš Pavlović came to his aid again, and the two advanced towards Pomorje. Thomas retook Drijeva, but his advance was suddenly halted, perhaps by another Turkish incursion or a truce. Hostilities finally ended in September.

=== Conversion and marriage ===
Having failed to strengthen royal authority by force, King Thomas decided to seek another way to pacify the kingdom. A rapprochement with Kosača via marriage with his daughter Catherine was probably already envisaged in 1445, when Thomas improved relations with the Holy See in order to be cleared of the "stain of illegitimacy" as well as to receive an annulment of his union with Vojača. Pope Eugene IV responded affirmatively on 29 May. By that time, Thomas appears to have decided to join the Roman Catholic Church. Negotiations with Kosača intensified in the beginning of 1446. King Thomas was then finally converted from Bosnian Christianity to Roman Catholicism by Tommaso Tommasini, Bishop of Lesina; however, Cardinal Juan Carvajal only performed the baptism in 1457.

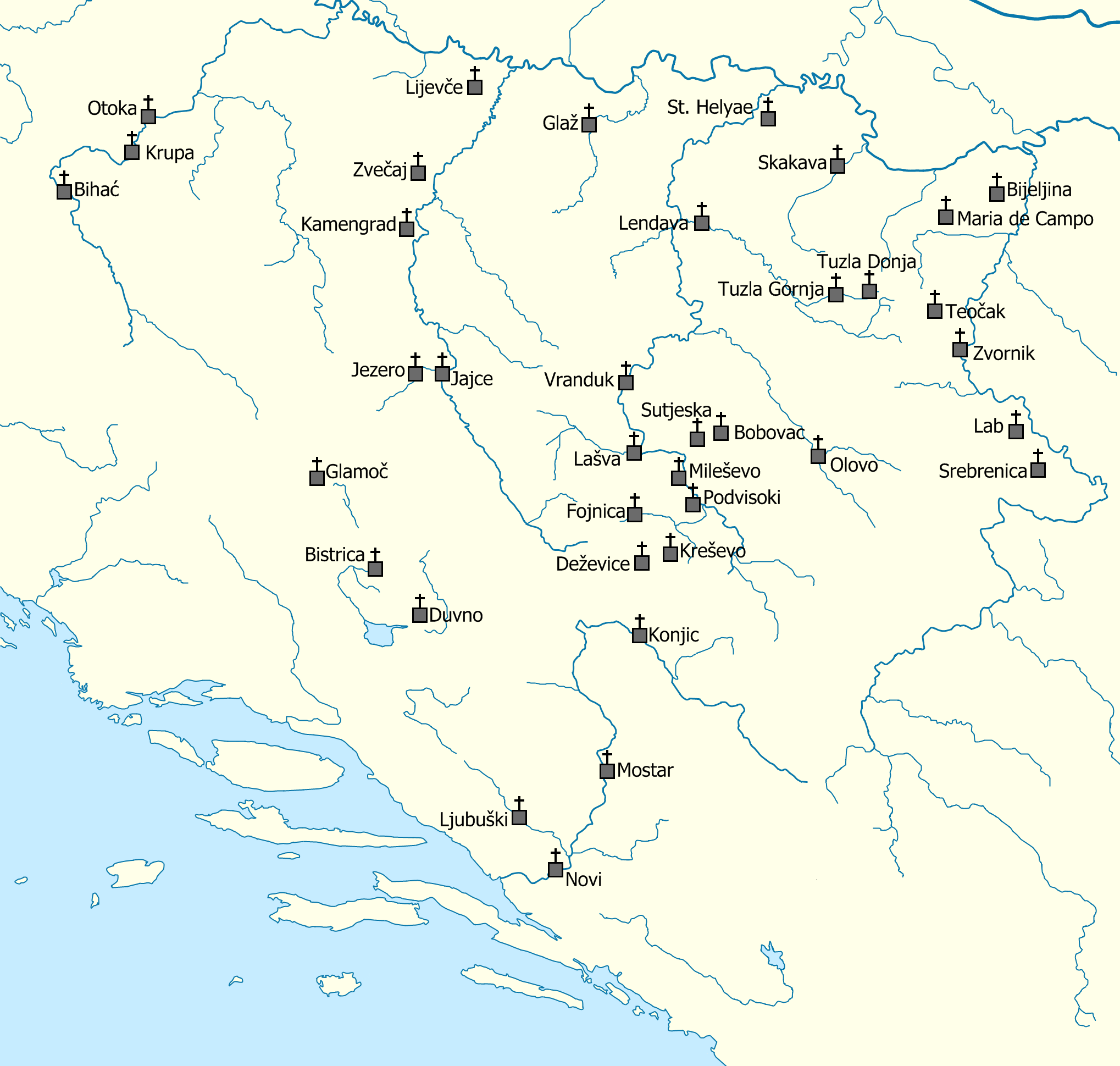
Roman Catholic monasteries during Thomas' reign

Thomas' intention to marry Kosača's daughter Catherine was made known in April, their lands and borders reverting to status quo ante bellum. The prospective bride, a Bosnian Christian, also had to convert to Catholicism for the marriage to proceed. These developments angered Ivaniš Pavlović and Petar Vojsalić, another vassal, but in the end no conflict with them took place. Elaborate festivities marked the royal wedding in mid-May in Milodraž, conducted by Catholic rite, followed by the couple's coronation in Mile. For the first time, a crown was sent from Rome to be placed on the head of a Bosnian king. The Bishop of Feltre and papal legate to Bosnia, another Tommaso Tommasini, fetched the crown from the Cathedral of Saint Domnius in Spalato in July, but it never reached Thomas.

As it facilitated alliances with Western rulers and came along with Western cultural influences (in art, architecture, music and fashion) that penetrated Bosnia, Roman Catholicism became the preferable faith early in Thomas' reign. Many Bosnian noblemen followed the King's example in converting to Catholicism, but some soon returned to the Bosnian Church; Kosača wrote that he considered conversion, but never went through with it. Churches and Franciscan monasteries sprang up throughout Bosnia during Thomas' reign, some erected by the King himself. Despite his efforts to project an image of a good Catholic king, Thomas' religious policy was not initially so resolute. He continued honoring Bosnian Christians and their clergy as his predecessors had done, which led to disputes with local Franciscans. Pope Eugene agreed that, for political reasons, King Thomas had to tolerate heretics.

== Peak ==
Peace brought unusual stability to Bosnia as well as security to Thomas. He retook Srebrenica once again in the autumn of 1446, and eventually struck a short-lived compromise with Branković by which the two would share the town and its mining revenues. It was not to last, however. Unfounded rumour had it that Hungarian noblemen considered offering the Holy Crown of Hungary to him, which testified to his growing reputation. The Ottomans, who wanted to weaken Bosnia by encouraging internal division, were very displeased by the kingdom's stability. At the request of Đurađ Branković, the Turks broke into both King Thomas' personal lands, and those of his father-in-law, in March 1448, plundering and burning towns. Kosača, who now called himself "Herzog of Saint Sava", was thus forced to side with Branković against his son-in-law and king. In mid-September, Branković's brother-in-law Thomas Kantakouzenos, leading an army that included Kosača himself, soundly defeated King Thomas.

King Thomas reconquered Srebrenica again in February 1449, but hostilities continued until 1451, when the King made peace again with his insubordinate father-in-law. The dispute was even taken before the Diet of Hungary. To finance this incessant warfare, as well as to sustain the royal court, King Thomas engaged in vigorous commerce and made business deals with Dalmatian traders. He relied heavily on his silver mining, but profited most from his salt trade monopolies.

=== In-laws' conflict ===
In 1451 when Kosača sought to improve his own economy through a war with the Republic of Ragusa, Thomas refused to join either side, but still interceded with Pope Nicholas V to prevent his father-in-law's excommunication. However, Ragusa persisted and promised to return the favor by helping Thomas take Drijeva from Kosača, and Hodidjed from the Turks. In the summer, Thomas was even approached by Kosača's family, namely the King's brother-in-law Vladislav and mother-in-law Jelena, who were gravely offended when the Duke took his son's charming Sienese bride as his concubine. In mid-December, Thomas finally agreed with Ragusa on a pact against his infamous father-in-law, but the war ended abruptly when Hungary and the Ottomans signed a truce which specifically forbade the latter's tributary to attack Ragusa.

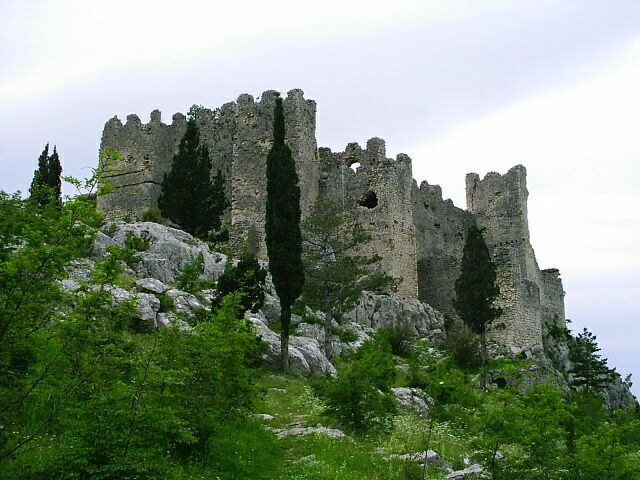
Blagaj Fort, contested between Thomas and his brother-in-law

Open rebellion against Stjepan Kosača broke out in March 1452. Vladislav, along with his mother and grandmother, raised an army and took control over most of his father's territory. Thomas, Vladislav's king and brother-in-law, answered his call for help and arrived with his army the following month. Ragusa also joined them. However, King Thomas proved reluctant to attack and soon went back north to ward off a Turkish incursion. Kosača seized the opportunity to enlist help from Venice, which took Drijeva from Vladislav, and to entice uprisings against the rebels themselves. Thomas returned, as he had promised, chasing the Venetians from Drijeva and easily defeating his brother-in-law's enemies. The coalition then suddenly fell apart when it became clear that Vladislav would not hand over parts of his patrimony that Thomas claimed as his due, namely Drijeva and Blagaj, which was the Kosača seat and the key to Zachlumia.

New conflict emerged in 1453 upon the death of Petar Talovac, who had governed Croatia proper as ban on behalf of the Hungarian king. Both Thomas and his recently widowed father-in-law wished to gain control of Talovac's allodial land by offering marriage to his widow, Hedwig Garai; Kosača proposed himself, while Thomas suggested his son Stephen. Kosača invited Turks to Bosnia in autumn, but neither prevailed as Venice moved in to protect Talovac's heirs. They then made peace, realizing that the Ottomans, who had just stunned Europe by conquering Constantinople, would soon be at their gates as well. Another concern was the end of regency for the hitherto underage Hungarian king Ladislaus the Posthumous, which decreased the influence of Thomas' friend János Hunyadi, and led to the rise of Ulrich of Celje, who was supported by Kosača. After Ladislaus made Ulrich the new Ban of Croatia, the latter started seizing control of Croatian towns, which met strong opposition from Thomas. The Bosnian king feared that Ulrich would take Talovac's land and have his territory border Kosača's. Not wishing to break peace with his father-in-law yet again, the King turned to Venice for help.

=== Christian coalition ===
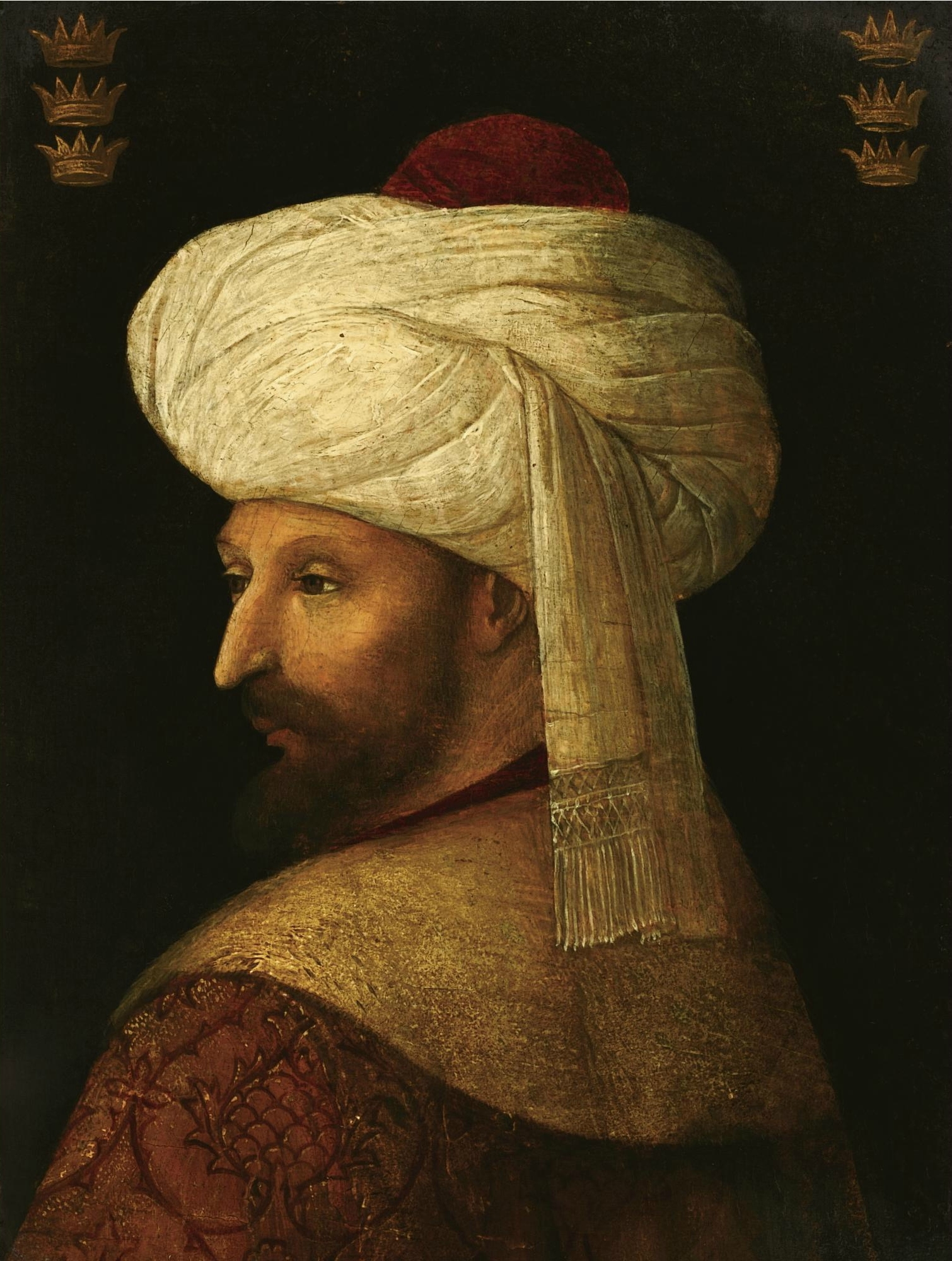
Mehmed, painted by a follower of Gentile Bellini

The Holy See put King Thomas under its protection in 1455, and promised that he would be given back the lands taken by Turks and his treacherous magnates if the Christians defeated the Ottomans. In 1456, Thomas sent a letter to Pope Callixtus III asking him to find a bride for his son Stephen, hoping that the Holy See would provide him with a daughter-in-law of royal blood. Preparations were under way for another Ottoman attack on Hungary in the beginning of that year. Mehmed the Conqueror, the Ottoman sultan, issued unusual demands to the King of Bosnia and his nobles, the Kosačas and the Pavlović family. He asked Thomas to send 10,000 loads of food, his father-in-law 8,000 and Petar Pavlović 4,000. Mehmed also demanded that they commit their troops and personally take part in the war on the Ottoman side. He also requested from Thomas the cession of four towns: two in the middle of Bosnia and two bordering Hungary and Venetian Dalmatia. This was all refused.

By now Thomas suspected that Mehmed also intended to conquer his kingdom. Therefore, he started taking more interest in a Christian coalition against the Turks, and cooperating more closely with his father-in-law. The lack of a firmer action against the Ottomans was blamed on Bosnian Christians, whom he described as being more inclined towards the Muslims than towards other Christians. The heavy Ottoman defeat by Hungarians at the Battle of Belgrade in July 1456 did nothing to alleviate Thomas' situation, as Mehmed started exerting an even greater pressure on Bosnia. In addition to financial extortion, Thomas was now forbidden to export silver, which Mehmed claimed for himself. This severe crippling of the Bosnian economy suffocated the kingdom.

Crusader's cross

The situation in Hungary took a sharp turn for the worse immediately after the celebrated victory over the Turks. The victorious commanders, including János Hunyadi, died of plague, Ulrich of Celje was murdered, and even the young King Ladislaus died suddenly the following year. The aged Đurađ Branković also died, his despotate passing to his son Lazar. Realizing that Hungary was drastically weakened, and that he had crossed the point of no return by refusing the Sultan's demands, Thomas decided to step forward to head the Christian coalition. In August 1456, Ragusa received an information from the King in the utmost secrecy: he was intent on declaring war on the Turks. He was far from capable of succeeding, and even suffered a Turkish raid in the beginning of 1457.

Pope Callixtus III took King Thomas very seriously: he ordered that the King of Bosnia be handed the Crusaders' cross, the papal flag and the crusading fund, marking him as the leader of the coalition in July 1457. However, Thomas relied not on his own dubious strength, but on the assistance of Western rulers. His emissaries to King Alfonso V of Aragon, Doge Francesco Foscari of Venice, Duke Francesco I Sforza of Milan, and Duke Philip the Good of Burgundy all reported refusals of help. Cardinal Carvajal was sent to Bosnia to meet with King Thomas. Cardinal Giovanni Castiglione sceptically wrote that Carvajal would have been better off if he had stayed in Buda. Indeed, Carvajal found Thomas ill-equipped to deal with the enemy. The Pope became disillusioned with him, and transferred the leadership of the Christian coalition to the Albanian lord Skanderbeg.

== Fall into disrepute ==
=== Expansion efforts ===
The ultimately failed crusading efforts did not preclude Thomas from seeking expansion. The death of the heirless Ulrich of Celje reopened the possibility of seizing Talovac lands, but his father-in-law moved more quickly, leading to a new brief cooling in their relations. However, in January 1458 a new opportunity arose on Bosnia's eastern border. The turmoil that followed the death of Lazar Branković enabled Thomas to retake the formerly Bosnian part of the Drina River valley, conquered by Lazar's father in the preceding decade, as well as to expand into its right bank. Thomas captured a total of eleven towns, keeping Srebrenica, Zvornik and Teočak for himself, and distributing the rest among the local nobility who swore fealty to him. He then turned his attention back to Croatia. He suggested to Venice that since the Hungarians had not yet appointed a new ban of Croatia, he and the Republic should split the banate among themselves. In June, he warned Venice that the new Hungarian king Matthias Corvinus, Hunyadi's son, would not be a good neighbour to either Bosnia or Venice if he took hold of Croatia.

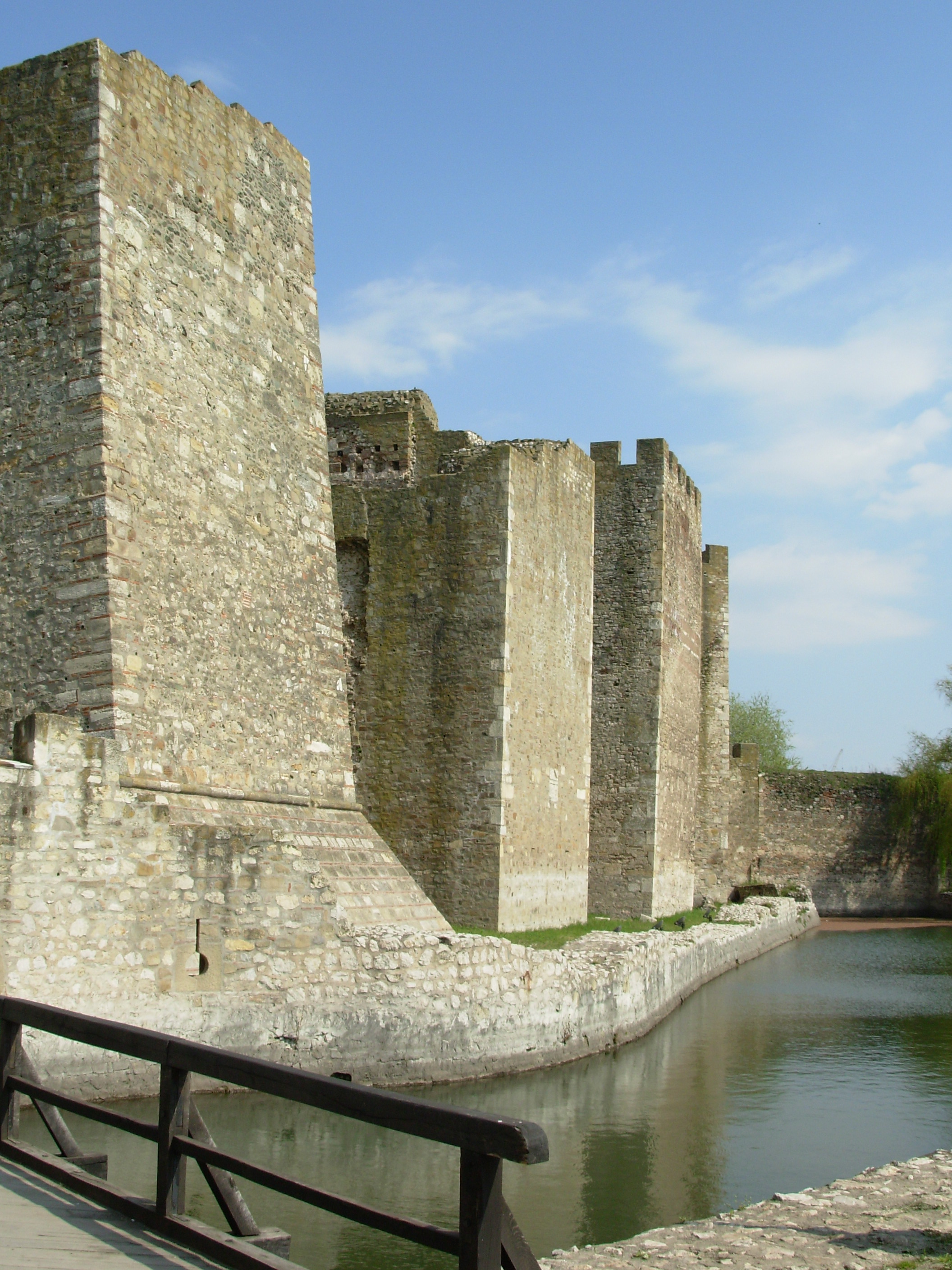
Smederevo Fortress, an important, but not lasting, acquisition

A large Turkish raid in February 1458 forced Thomas to sign a truce, despite his earlier crusading vows, but Mehmed no longer insisted on the cession of the four towns; he intended to conquer Serbia instead. At that time, King Thomas dropped the plan of having his son marry an illegitimate daughter of Francesco Sforza; the match with a bastard daughter of a duke was far beneath the King's expectations for Stephen. Instead, he successfully negotiated with Lazar's widow, the Byzantine princess Helena Palaiologina, about a marriage between Stephen and her oldest daughter, Helena. That way Thomas procured not only a daughter-in-law of imperial blood, but also found a way to extend the Kotromanić rule to the Despotate of Serbia, now reduced to the Smederevo Fortress and its surroundings, as Lazar had left no sons.

Thomas sent word of the plans to King Matthias, his feudal overlord, in October. In early December, Thomas himself went to meet Matthias at a diet in Szeged. Matthias was thrilled and urged Thomas to send his son as soon as possible. During Thomas' long absence, Turks broke into Bosnia and besieged Bobovac and Vranduk, but his son Stephen and brother Radivoj escaped. Thomas returned to Bosnia in mid-January 1459 and took up the fight against the attackers, even trying to eject them from Hodidjed. In mid-April, he raided the outskirts of Hodidjed and besieged the fort.

Meanwhile, Thomas' son had married Lazar's daughter and taken possession of Smederevo. Thomas boasted about his son being made despot, but the arrangement was cut short by the arrival of Mehmed at the head of a vast force before the walls of Smederevo. Terrified, Thomas' son and brother agreed to surrender the town and fortress on 20 June in exchange for safe conduct. Thomas and Radivoj were bitterly reproached by the Hungarian king. Matthias told all Europe that Thomas had sold the fortress of paramount importance to the enemy. Thomas took great pains to clear his name, explaining to Pope Pius II that Smederevo could not have been defended. The King sent a delegation to the Council of Mantua in July, promising to do his best to hold the Turks back and begging for help. The only ruler to provide assistance to Thomas was Bianca Maria Visconti, Duchess of Milan, who sent 300 men via Ancona.

=== Religious persecution ===
Unlike in other Balkan states of the time, the politics of Bosnia were not dominated by religion, and its rulers as well as the common people were entirely indifferent to the religious beliefs of others. However, this changed in 1459 when the Ottoman threat became greater. Pope Pius II informed Thomas that he would not come to his aid as long as the Bosnian Church was tolerated. Thomas was anxious to appear as a good Catholic in the wake of Hungarian accusations of betraying the Christendom.

The decision Thomas took in 1459 made him the first Bosnian ruler to persecute people for their religious beliefs, a policy popes had long demanded by the Holy See. The Bosnian Church had been decimated by Catholic, and then even Orthodox, proselytization and its own low morale. Thomas' order that its clergy either convert or leave his domain was followed by confiscation of their considerable property, which probably helped him make the otherwise difficult decision. The persecution lasted almost two years. 12,000 people were forcefully converted, while forty members of the clergy fled to his father-in-law's domain. In 1461, he sent three men accused of heresy to be questioned by Cardinal Juan de Torquemada in Rome. The Bosnian Church was thus all but annihilated by King Thomas.

The persecution did little to restore Thomas' reputation in Catholic Europe. When possession of the formerly Talovac-held Čačvina Castle caused another feud with his father-in-law in 1459, Kosača accused him of having invited the Turks who plundered his land. The accusation reached Pope Pius, who ordered that the King be excommunicated if such a grave offense against Christian interests were proven. Though Thomas probably did invite the Turkish raiders, the excommunication never took place.

== Last years ==
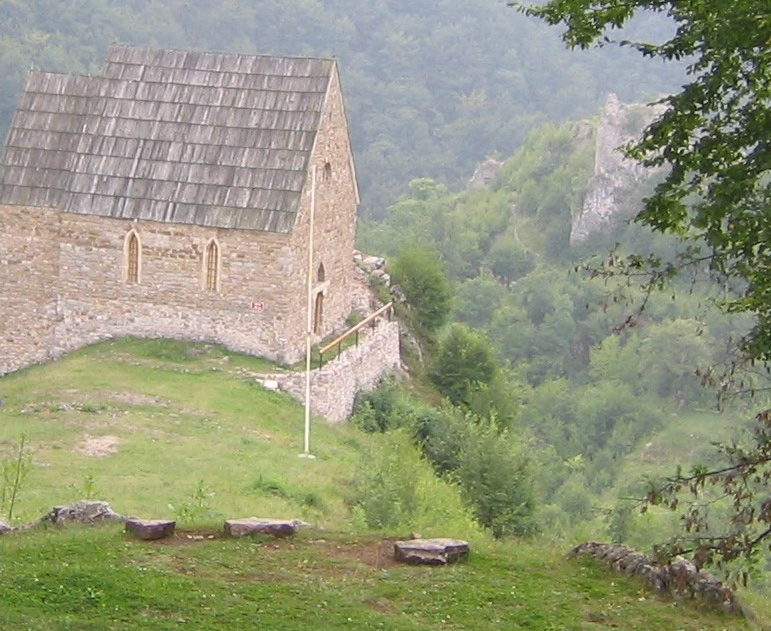
Restored chapel among the ruins of Bobovac

The fall of Serbia meant that the eastern border of Thomas' realm was now the bulwark of Christendom. However, Bosnia was not Mehmed's priority. Thomas was forced to surrender northeastern Bosnia, namely Usora, Srebrenica, Zvornik and Teočak, in early 1460, allowing the Turks to cross the Sava to the Hungarian regions of Slavonia and Syrmia. Both Thomas and his father-in-law were aware that the Ottoman conquest of Bosnia was inevitable. They continued to seek foreign assistance, but were also preparing for a life in exile. However, this prospect did not help them settle their differences and put up a more effective defence.

Thomas, still estranged from his in-laws, fell ill in June 1461 and requested a physician from Ragusa. He died in July, aged around 50. (Note: Thomas' age was estimated by the anthropologist Živko Mikić based on forensic dentistry.) He was buried in the royal mausoleum in Bobovac.

The circumstances of his death are unclear. Rumours circulated, first recorded by a gunsmith from Nuremberg, that the King's death was not natural. Specifically, it was said that his brother Radivoj and son Stephen had conspired against him. Later narratives also involved Mehmed and Matthias in the plot, with the Hungarian king as the mastermind. These rumours are generally dismissed by historians. Stephen succeeded him, to the benefit of the doomed kingdom, as the ruptures between the monarch and his nobles were finally healed.

== Personality and legacy ==
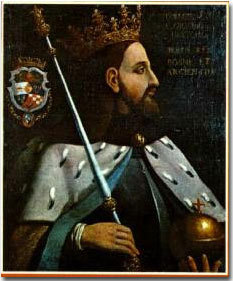
1910 depiction of King Thomas

Thomas was a man of many contradictions. His good looks and noble comportment greatly impressed his contemporaries. The Italian condottiero Gaspare Broglio da Lavello (son of Angelo Tartaglia), whom he met in 1452, wrote that he had never met a prince more refined and dignified, surpassing even the intellectual humanist Federico da Montefeltro, Broglio's idol. At the same time, Thomas' inconstancy and lack of courage inspired disdain. He was capable of both great generosity and pettiness. Fickleness damaged his reputation abroad, while religious persecution and forced conversions caused disapproval at home; he was cursed in the early years of the Ottoman rule for robbing the indigenous Bosnian Church of its property.

Thomas' union with Vojača produced at least four children: Stephen (who succeeded him), a son who died as a child during a pilgrimage to Meleda, a daughter who married a Hungarian nobleman in 1451, and another daughter who married in 1451. With Catherine, who outlived both him and his kingdom, Thomas had a son named Sigismund in 1449 and a daughter named Catherine in 1453.

== Family tree ==
Stephen I
Stephen II	Vladislav
Catherine	Tvrtko I	Ostoja	Kosača
Hermann	Tvrtko II	Stephen	Radivoj	Thomas	Catherine	Vladislav
Frederick
Ulrich

== Bibliography ==
- Anđelić, Pavao (1973), Bobovac i Kraljeva Sutjeska: stolna mjesta bosanskih vladara u XIV i XV stoljeću (in Serbo-Croatian), Veselin Masleša, OCLC 164951935
- Ćirković, Sima (1964). Историја средњовековне босанске државе [History of the Medieval Bosnian State]. Београд: Српска књижевна задруга.
- Ćošković, Pejo (2009), Kotromanići (in Croatian), Miroslav Krleža Institute of Lexicography
- Fine, John Van Antwerp Jr. (1994) [1987]. The Late Medieval Balkans: A Critical Survey from the Late Twelfth Century to the Ottoman Conquest. Ann Arbor, Michigan: University of Michigan Press. ISBN 0-472-08260-4.
- Fine, John Van Antwerp Jr. (2007) [1975]. The Bosnian Church: Its Place in State and Society from the Thirteenth to the Fifteenth Century. London: Saqi Books. ISBN 978-0-86356-503-8.
- Mandić, Dominik (1975), Bosna i Hercegovina, Zajednica izdanja ranjeni labud, OCLC 679879530
- Špoljarić, Luka (2019). "The Renaissance Papacy and Catholicization of the Manichean Heretics: Rethinking the 1459 Purge of the Bosnian Kingdom". Global Reformations: Transforming Early Modern Religions, Societies, and Cultures. London & New York: Routledge. pp. 153–175.

Regnal titles
Preceded by Tvrtko II	King of Bosnia; 1443–1461	Succeeded by Stephen II
