= Stephen IV =

Stephen IV may refer to:

- Stephen IV, Greek Orthodox Patriarch of Antioch (died 744)
- Pope Stephen III, aka Stephen IV, (720–772), native of Sicily
- Pope Stephen IV, Pope from June 816 to January 817
- Stephen IV of Hungary (c. 1133 – 1165), King of Hungary and Croatia
- Stephen IV of Serbia (c. 1285 – 1331), King of Serbia
- Stephen Ostojić of Bosnia (died 1421), King of Bosnia
- Stephen IV of Moldavia (r. 1517–1527)
