= King Tvrtko =

King Tvrtko can refer to two medieval monarchs:

- Tvrtko I of Bosnia (1338–1391), first Bosnian king
- Tvrtko II of Bosnia (died 1443), son of Tvrtko I
