= Matija Vojsalić =

15th century Bosnian nobleman and titular king of Bosnia

Matija Vojsalić was the last known politically active member of the Bosnian noble family, the Hrvatinić.

He was the last mentioned in 1476, in the document stored in the archives of Republic of Ragusa. He was installed as King of Bosnia by the Ottoman Sultan as an answer to Nicholas of Ilok who was also named King of Bosnia by King Matthias Corvinus of Hungary. Vojsalić replaced Matthias of Bosnia as the Ottoman King of Bosnia.

However, he was accused of conspiring with the King of Hungary against the Ottomans, and removed from the throne. After this he was not mentioned anymore.

Royal titles
Vacant Title last held by Matija Radivojević	— TITULAR — King of Bosnia; 1472–1476	Vacant
