= Kujava Radinović =

Queen consort of Bosnia

Queen consort of Bosnia
- Tenure: 1399–1404; 1409–1415
- Spouse: Stephen Ostoja of Bosnia
- Issue: Stephen Ostojić of Bosnia
- House: House of Kotromanić
- Father: Radin Jablanić

Kujava Radinović (Serbian Cyrillic: Кујава Радиновић) was the second wife of King Stephen Ostoja of Bosnia and as such she was Queen of Bosnia from 1399 to 1404 and again from 1409 to 1415. She could be originating from the Pavlović-Radinović noble house, maybe even a daughter of the nobleman Radin Jablanić.

== Consort and Queen mother ==
Kujava married King Stjepan Ostoja Kotromanić in 1399, shortly after he repudiated his first wife, Queen Vitača. Ostoja gained support of the noble family of Radinović-Pavlović by marrying Kujava, as they were closely related to the new queen consort. Kujava was first cousin of duke Pavle Radinović. Kujava is first mentioned as queen in a charter dating from 5 February 1399. Queen Kujava resided in Bobovac along with her husband and son, Stjepan Ostojić. When her husband was deposed by the powerful Bosnian nobility in 1404, he left Bobovac and fled to Hungary, but Kujava and Stjepan remained in Bosnia. The crown was given to Kujava's nephew, King Tvrtko II. Tvrtko II himself was deposed in 1409 when Kujava's husband returned from exile and resumed the throne.

Queen Kujava's marriage started falling apart in 1415. Duke Pavle Radinović, Kujava's cousin, was killed in a plot set by Kujava's husband. The authorities of the Republic of Ragusa were informed that the Queen of Bosnia was concerned for her future due to her relation to Pavle. Duke Hrvoje Vukčić Hrvatinić died soon after, leaving behind a wealthy widow, Jelena Nelipčić. Seizeing the opportunity, Ostoja divorced Kujava and married the widowed duchess Jelena. His complicity in the plot and murder of Pavle Radinović outraged the magnates, who sharply denounced him at the stanak. The 16th century Ragusan historian Mavro Orbini wrote that even his son sided against him, resenting the treatment of his mother and the union with Jelena.

In 1418, Kujava's former husband died and their son was elected king. Kujava was now recognized as queen mother and suddenly became very influential and powerful, de facto ruling along with her son. Her son's short reign was marked by Queen Kujava's conflicts with Queen Jelena. Their conflicts stopped in the summer of 1419, when Stephen imprisoned his stepmother. Jelena died under suspicious circumstances in 1422.

== Intrigues ==
Kujava's son was dethroned in favour of Tvrtko II in 1420. He died before April 1422, when Kujava asked the Ragusan authorities to intervene with Tvrtko on her behalf. Nevertheless, she set about seeking revenge for her son's deposition. She received support from the Republic of Ragusa during its hostility towards Tvrtko, and conspired with certain magnates to dethrone him. She failed in her endeavour to enthrone Vuk Banić, a purported relative of the royal family, and Vuk had to flee to Ragusa along with some other conspirators. In March 1423 Tvrtko reprimanded Ragusa for allowing Vuk to exchange letters with his aunt, while Vuk himself maintained that he had never contacted her. The former queen then attempted to make use of the souring relations between Tvrtko and some of his vassals. With this in mind, she turned to Ragusa, but it is not clear what exactly she wanted. Ragusan authorities tried to reconcile her with Tvrtko, and also intervened on her behalf with Sandalj Hranić Kosača and the Zlatonosović family. They also assisted her with her financial difficulties. Kujava was still intriguing in 1426, secretly corresponding with Vuk. Her influence in the kingdom and abroad had waned considerably, however. Ragusan authorities, having settled their differences with Tvrtko, refused her appeal for financial aid. In 1434, they again sent her gifts, this time through an envoy of another pretender, her husband's illegitimate son Radivoj Ostojić.

Three sets of remains were discovered in a small tomb in the Bobovac chapel during archaeological excavations in the 1960s, apparently reinterred there during the reign of Tvrtko II. They are believed to belong to Kujava, her former husband and her son.

Royal titles
Vacant Title last held by Vitača	Queen consort of Bosnia; 1399–1404	Vacant Title next held by unknown wife of Tvrtko II
Preceded by unknown wife of Tvrtko II	Queen consort of Bosnia; 1409–1415	Vacant Title next held by Jelena Nelipčić
