= Vranduk (Zenica) =

- Village
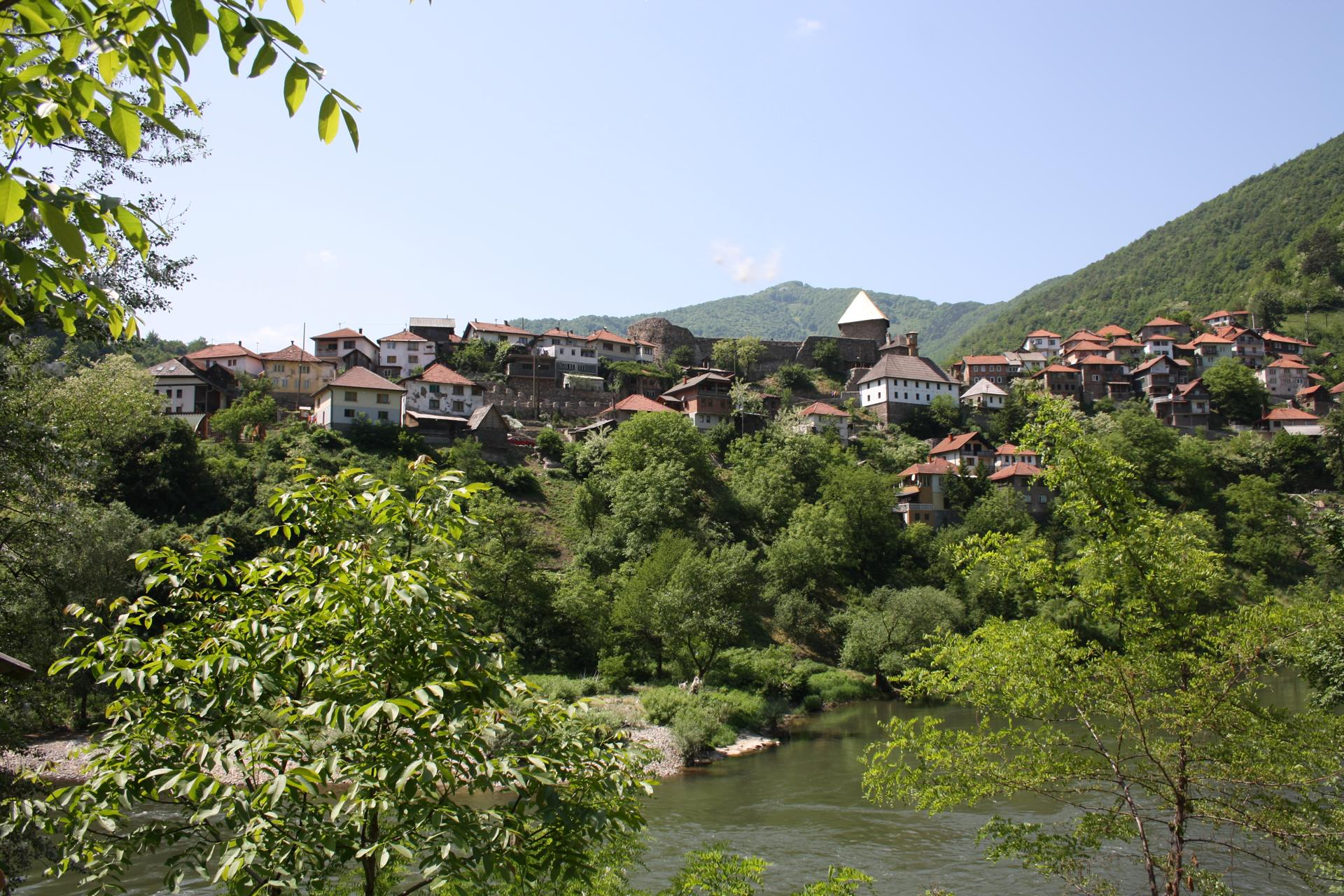
- Vranduk from just above the waterline of the Bosna river

- Vranduk in Bosnia and Herzegovina
- Coordinates: 44°17′34″N 17°54′14″E
- Country: Bosnia and Herzegovina
- Entity: Federation of Bosnia and Herzegovina
- Canton: Zenica-Doboj
- Municipality: Zenica
- Established: 14th century

Area
  - Total: 2.19 sq mi (5.66 km^{2})

Population (2013)
  - Total: 447
  - Density: 205/sq mi (79.0/km^{2})
- Time zone: UTC+1 (CET)
  - Summer (DST): UTC+2 (CEST)
- Website: Vranduk - zemuzej.ba

Vranduk is a historic village in the municipality of Zenica, Bosnia and Herzegovina.

== Geography ==
It is situated on the Bosna River canyon, just downstream from city of Zenica, at the site called the Vranduk Pass. The main road Sarajevo-Zenica-Doboj (M17) passes through the canyon and the village. On 14 February 1971 a rail crash in the tunnel near Vranduk occurred, 34 people were killed and 113 (60 serious) injured.

== History ==
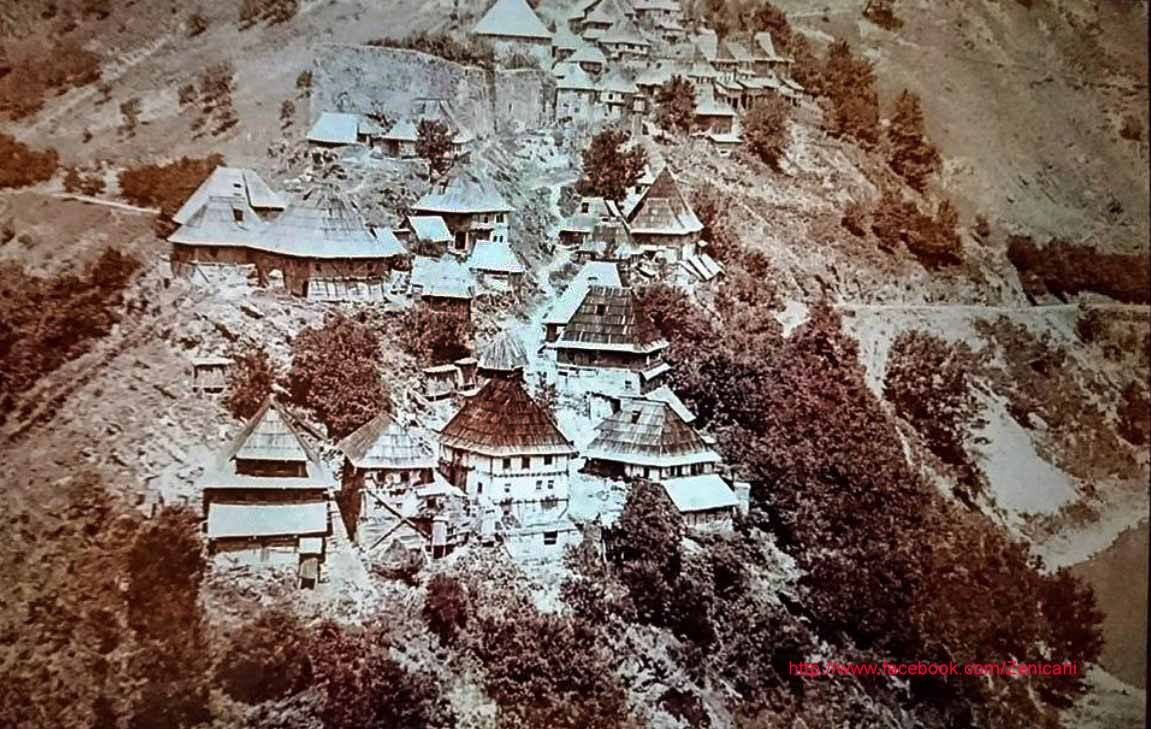
Vranduk with its medieval citadel, as photographed 1895

Archaeological excavations to date on the site of the fort showed no signs of fortifications dating from the prehistoric period or antiquity, or prior to the medieval times. The village itself is one of the oldest and well preserved settlements of Bosnia and Herzegovina, dating back to the 14th century and times of medieval bans and later kings of Bosnia. Vranduk village was established around a medieval citadel of the same name, and together constitute a protected architectural assembly, and as such it is a national monument of Bosnia and Herzegovina, well preserved and maintained in good condition by local and state commissions for national monuments, and managed by a local tourist organization. A small mosque was erected below the citadel after the Ottoman conquest of the Bosnian Kingdom which still is standing today in good condition. The mosque was dedicated to and named after Sultan Mehmed II, conqueror of Bosnia, and is also referred to as the Imperial Mosque or Emperor's Mosque. In 1963, excavations were undertaken by Branka Raunig to explore the impact of the Roman empire on the village.

== Demographics ==
According to the 2013 census, its population was 447.

Ethnicity in 2013
Ethnicity	Number	Percentage
Bosniaks	445	99.6%
other/undeclared	2	0.4%
Total	447	100%

== Gallery ==
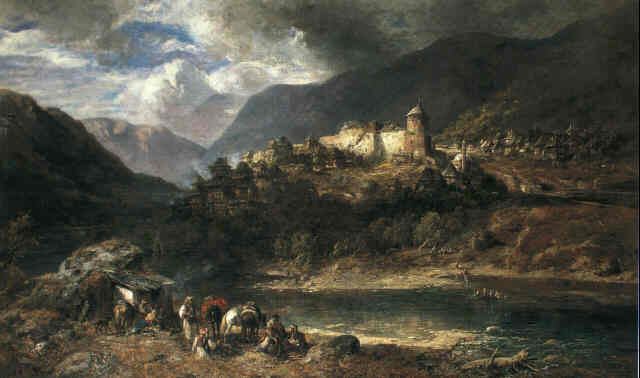
Vranduk, oil painting

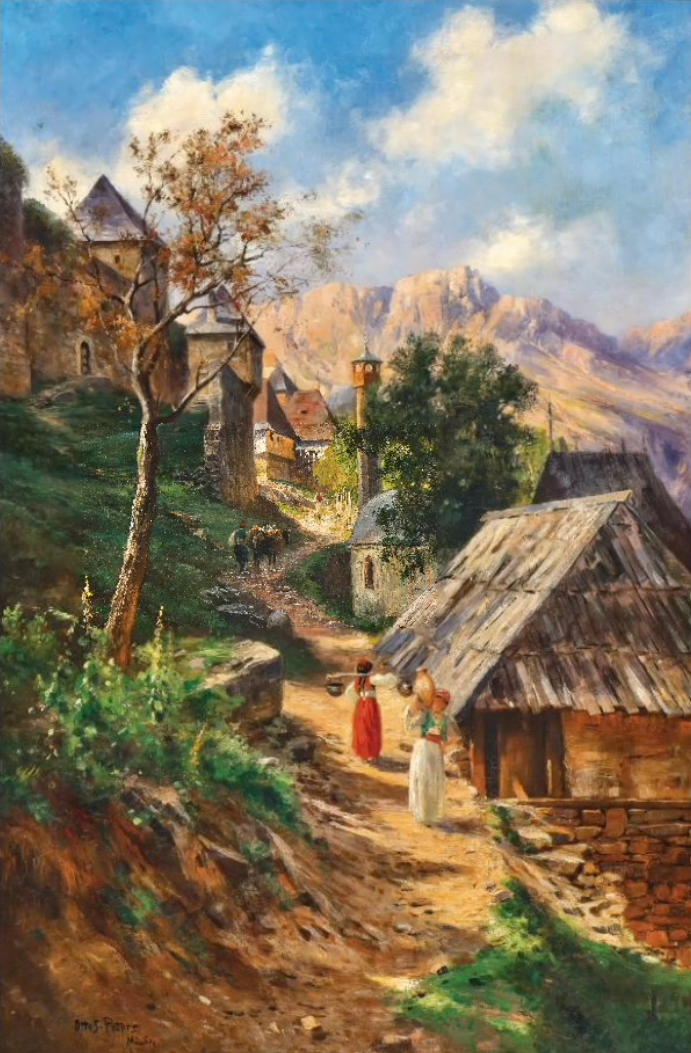
Vranduk Castle and the Sultan Mehmed II Fatih Mosque of 1463, oil painting by Otto Seraphim Peters (around 1885)

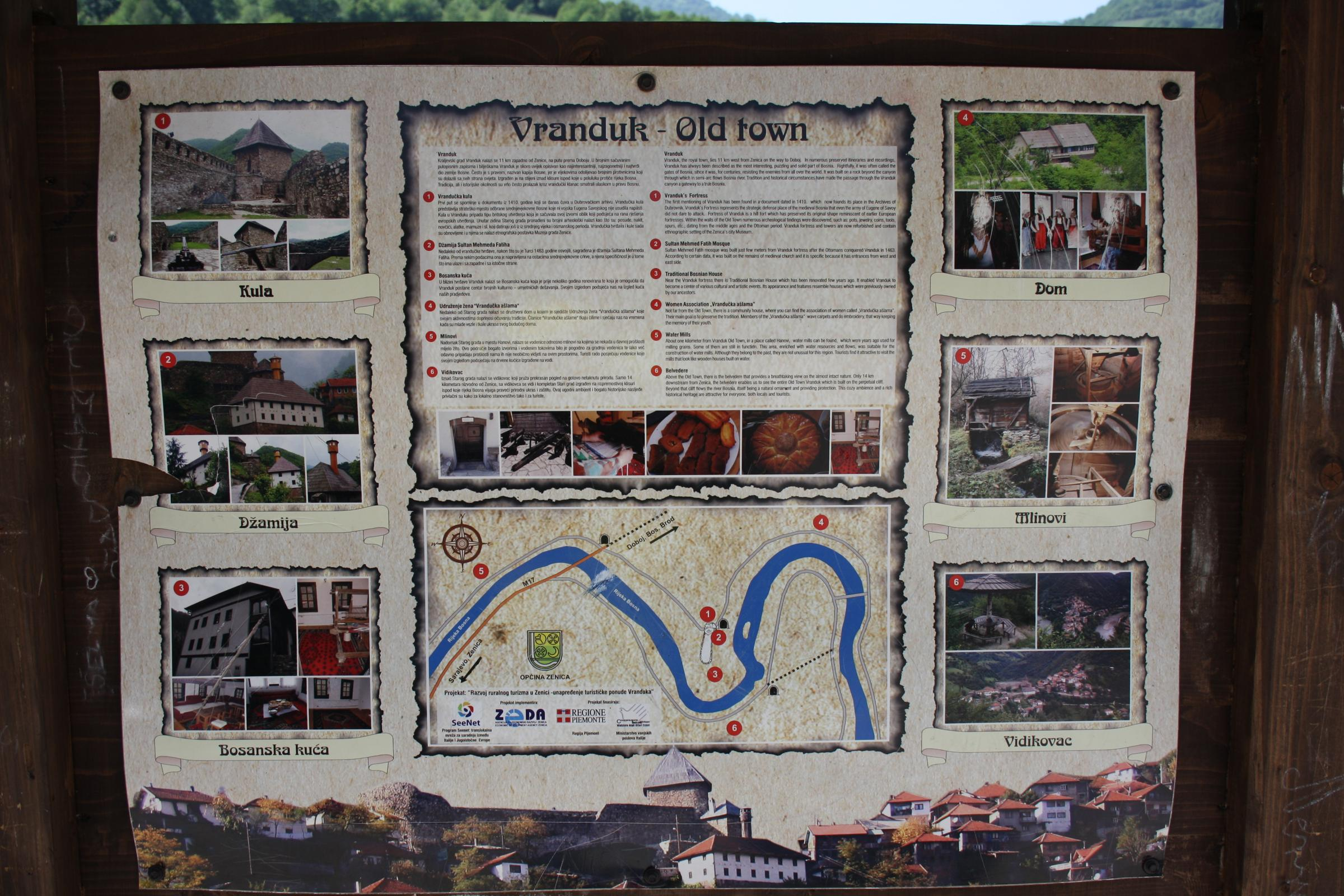
Vranduk, map and info table

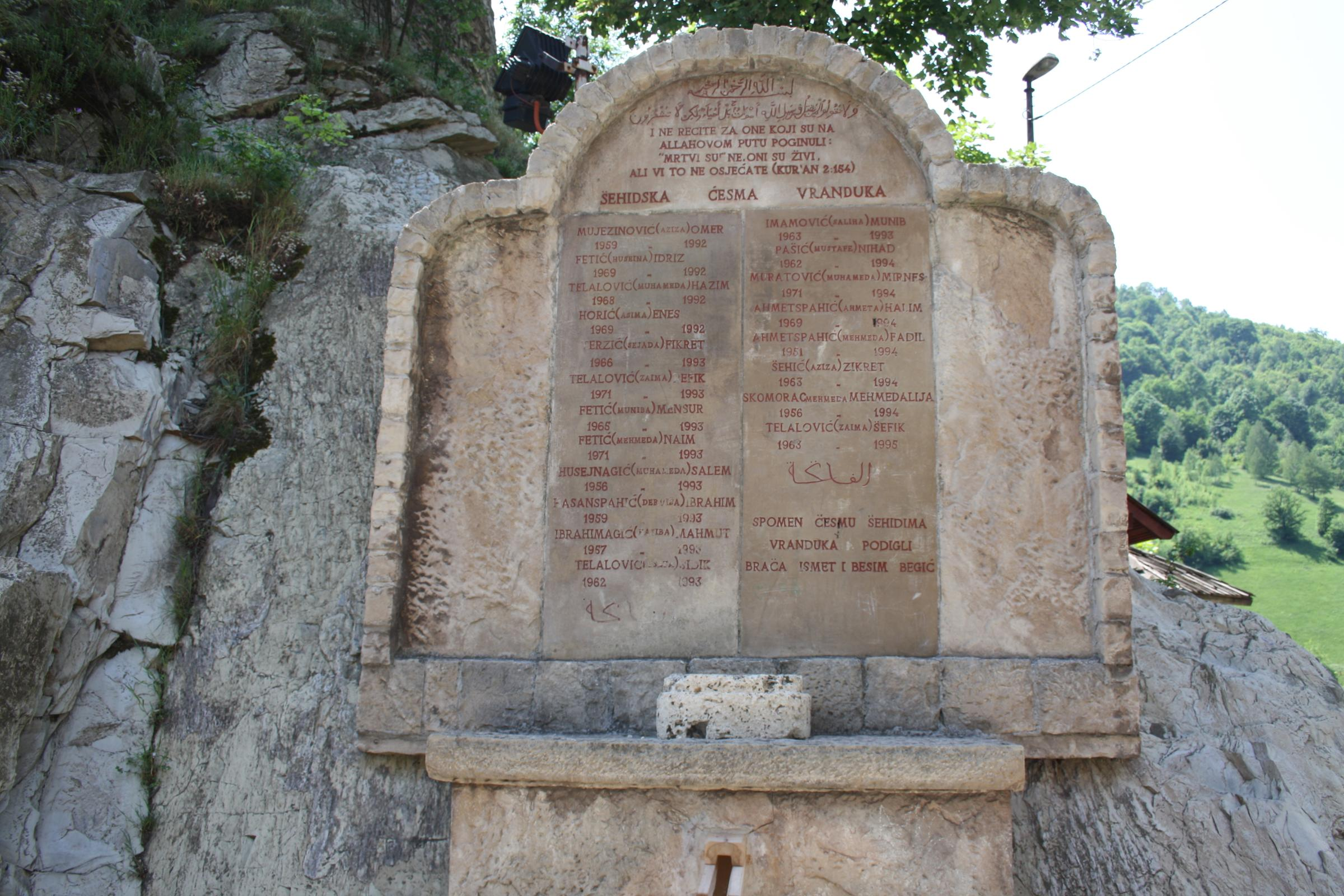
Vranduk, water-fountain

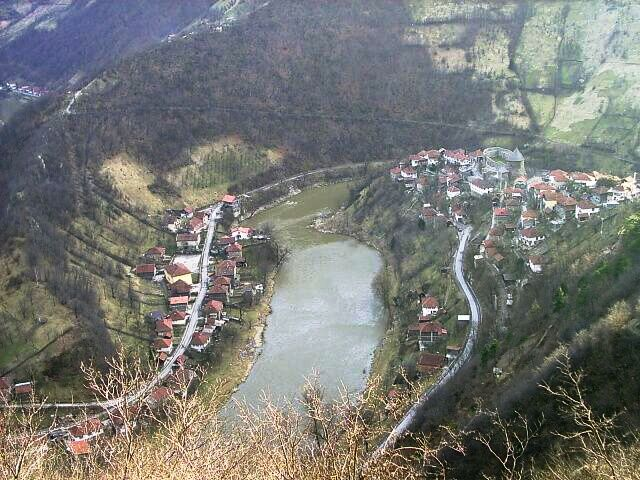
Vranduk, birdsview on the Vranduk Pass

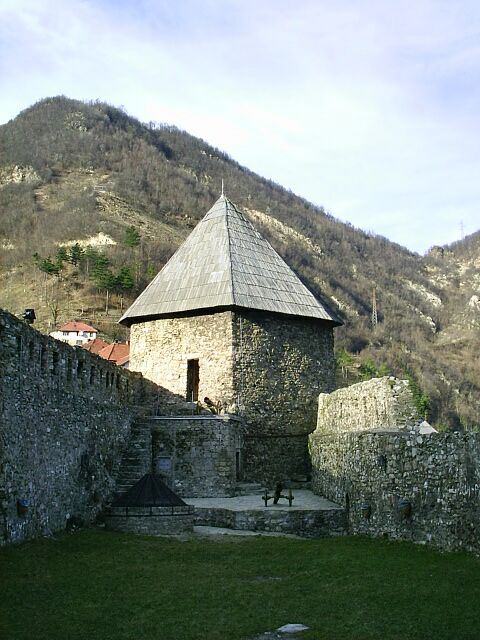
Vranduk, citadel

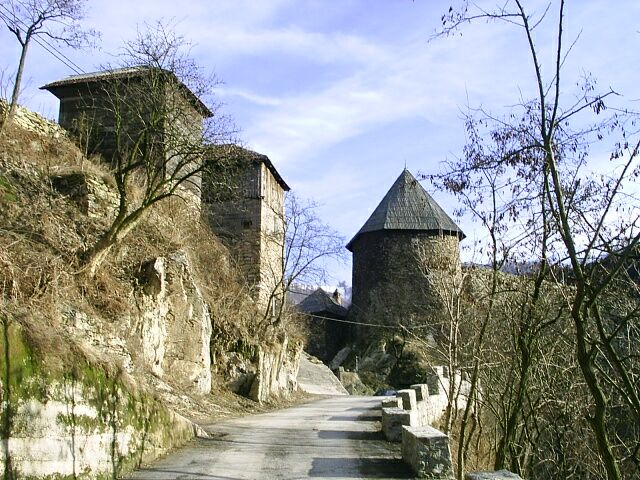
Vranduk, approach to citadel

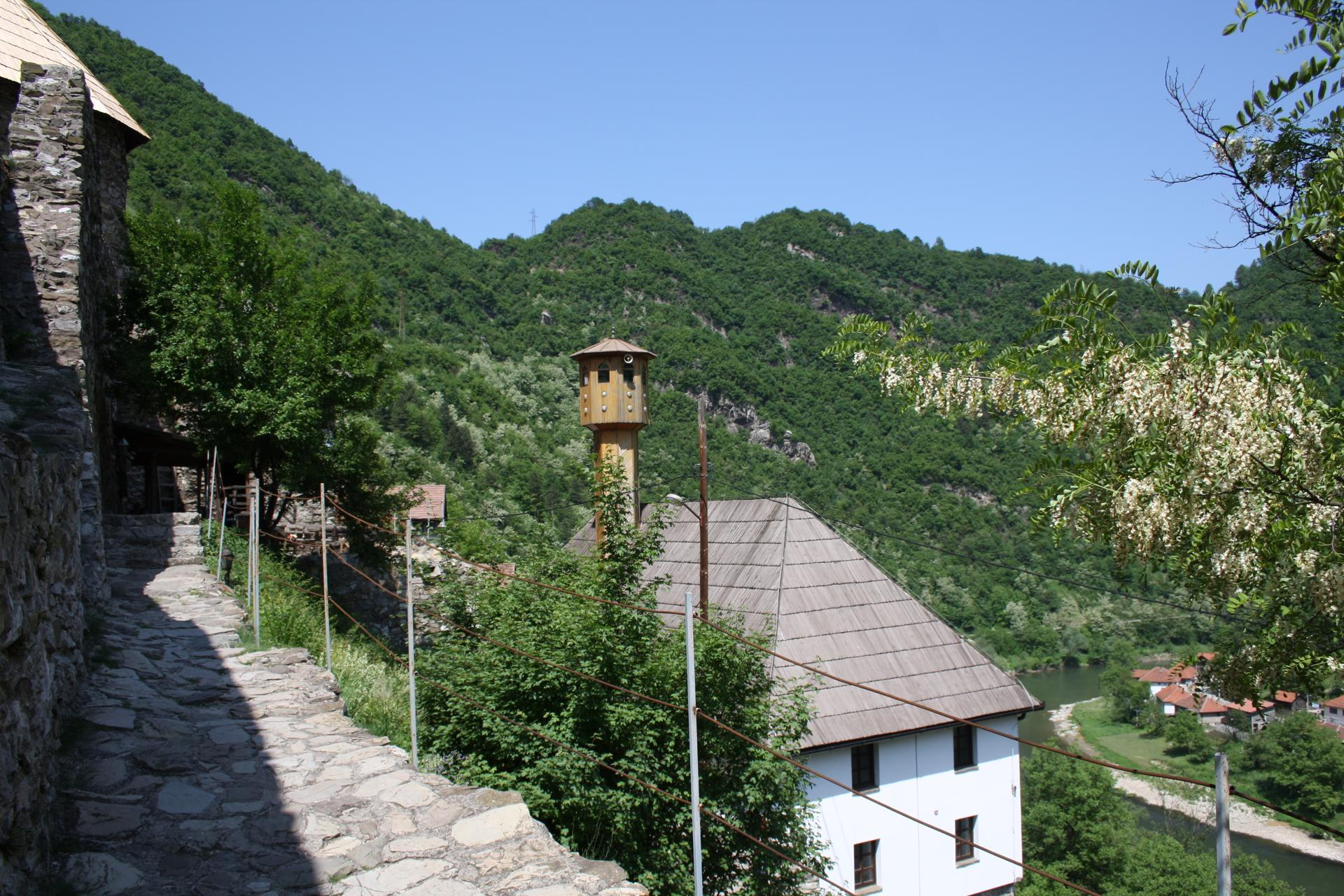
Vranduk, small mosque below citadel, dedicated to Sultan Mehmed II El Fatih also referred to as the Imperial or Emperor's mosque

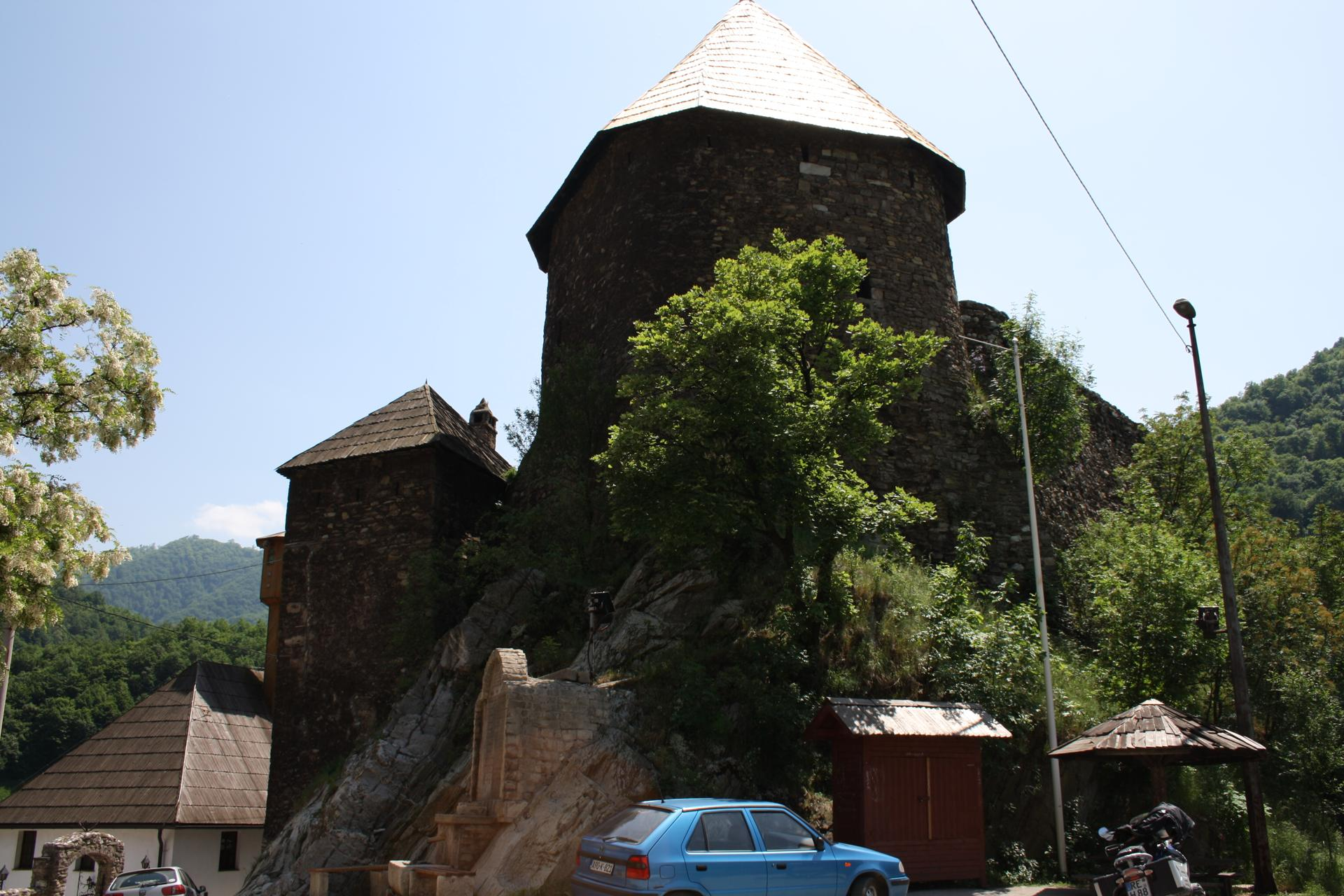
Vranduk, village center below citadel
