= Vojača =

Queen of Bosnia from 1443 to 1445

Vojača (Serbian Cyrillic: Војача) was queen consort of Bosnia from 1443 until 1445 as the first wife of King Thomas.

Vojača was a commoner and member of the Bosnian Church. She and Thomas married before his accession, and had two daughters and two sons. When her husband was elected King of Bosnia, Vojača became queen. However, the powerful Bosnian nobility did not consider her fit to be queen because of her humble origins. Thus, her husband requested an annulment of their marriage from Pope Eugene IV. The Pope granted the annulment in 1445 and Thomas remarried, this time choosing Katarina Kosača, the daughter of the most powerful Bosnian nobleman Stjepan Vukčić Kosača.

As former queen, Vojača probably retired to a monastery. Her son by Thomas, Stephen Tomašević, became King of Bosnia in 1461 but she did not live long enough to see him ascend the throne. Vojača's other son died at the age of 14 during a pilgrimage to Mljet, which he undertook with her according to Mavro Orbini.

Royal titles
Vacant Title last held by Dorothy Garai	Queen consort of Bosnia; 1443–1445	Vacant Title next held by Katarina Kosača
