= Tvrtko II of Bosnia =

Tvrtko II
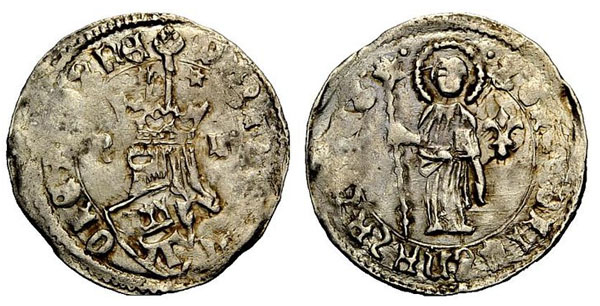
- Coin of Tvrtko II

King of Bosnia
- First reign: 1404–1409
- Predecessor: Ostoja
- Successor: Ostoja
- Second reign: 1420–1443
- Coronation: August 1421
- Predecessor: Stephen Ostojić
- Successor: Thomas
- Died: November 1443
- Spouse: Dorothy Garai
- House: Kotromanić
- Father: Tvrtko I of Bosnia
- Mother: possibly Dorothea of Bulgaria
- Religion: Roman Catholicism

Stephen Tvrtko II (Serbo-Croatian: Stjepan/Stefan Tvrtko, Стјепан/Стефан Твртко; died in November 1443), also known as Tvrtko Tvrtković (Твртко Твртковић), was a member of the House of Kotromanić who reigned as King of Bosnia from 1404 to 1409 and again from 1420 to his death.

Tvrtko II was the son of King Tvrtko I. His reigns took place during a very turbulent part of Bosnian history. He was first installed as a puppet king by the kingdom's leading noblemen, Hrvoje Vukčić Hrvatinić and Sandalj Hranić Kosača, to replace his increasingly dependent uncle Ostoja. Five years later, he lost the support of the nobility and thus the crown as well. He was hardly politically active during the second reign of Ostoja, but managed to depose and succeed Ostoja's son Stephen. Tvrtko's second reign was marked by repeated Turkish raids, which forced him to accept the Ottoman suzerainty, and the struggle for power with Radivoj, another son of Ostoja. Tvrtko was married twice, but died childless. He was succeeded by his chosen heir, Radivoj's brother Thomas.

== Background ==
Tvrtko II was the illegitimate son of Tvrtko I, the first King of Bosnia. The identity of his mother, and thus the legitimacy of his birth, is disputed. The uncertainty also stems from the complex religious situation in medieval Bosnia, where it was often hard to discern between legitimate and illegitimate offspring. The 16th-century Ragusan historian Mavro Orbini, writing of Tuartco Scuro (Tvrtko the Plain), claimed that he was born to Tvrtko I's concubine, a Bosnian noblewoman named Vukosava, and this view was taken for granted by subsequent writers. In the 19th century, Vjekoslav Klaić argued that Tvrtko II's mother was his father's wife, Dorothea of Bulgaria. Klaić cited as evidence Tvrtko I's charter of 1382, in which the King mentioned Queen Dorothea and an unnamed son to the government of the Republic of Ragusa. If Tvrtko II is the son his father mentioned in this charter, his birth would have had to have taken place between 1375 (Tvrtko I and Dorothea having married in December 1374) and the date the charter was issued.

King Tvrtko I died unexpectedly in March 1391, shortly after Queen Dorothea. The Council of the Kingdom, composed of the country's most prominent noblemen, elected his elderly relative, Dabiša, as his successor, rather than the deceased King's son, who was too young at the time. Upon Dabiša's death in 1395, the noblemen elected his widow, Helen. Three years later, they ousted her in favour of Ostoja. Ostoja's exact relationship with the preceding kings and Tvrtko II has been a matter of dispute, with many historians assuming that he was an illegitimate son of Tvrtko I. Dominik Mandić, however, showed that both Dabiša and Ostoja described Tvrtko I in charters as their brother. No records of Tvrtko II's life during this period survive.

== First reign ==
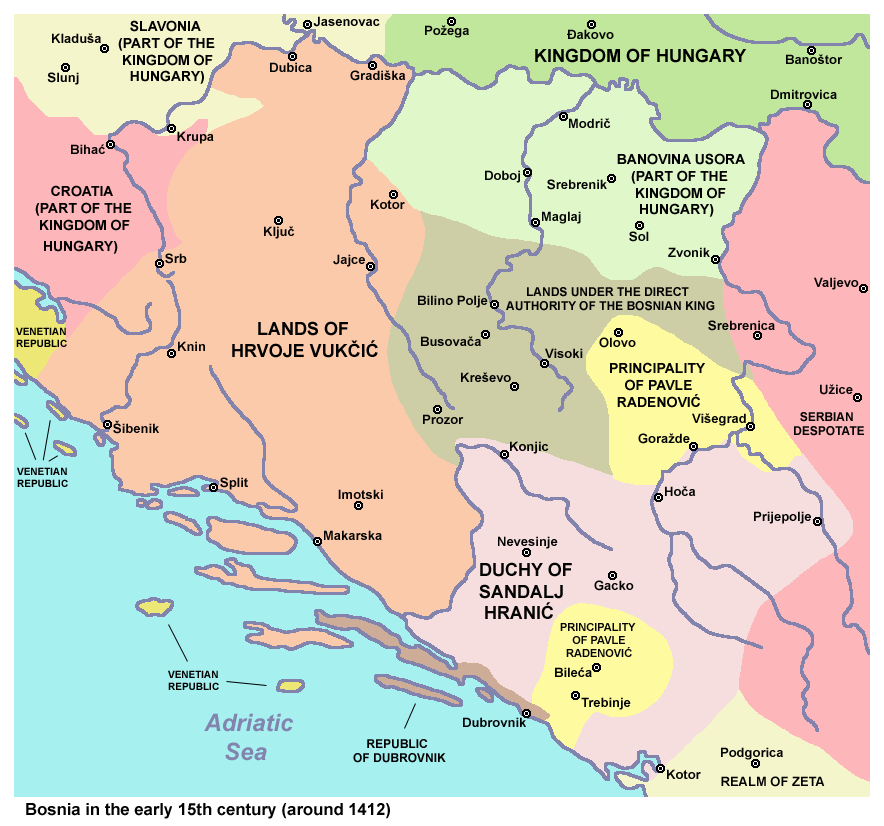
Bosnia in the first decades of the 15th century, with the royal demesne in olive green.

King Ostoja alienated the nobility by attempting to assert his independence from them. In March 1404, he fell out with his most powerful vassals, Hrvoje Vukčić Hrvatinić and Sandalj Hranić Kosača. At the end of April or the beginning of May, a stanak in Mile was convoked in which the nobility deposed Ostoja, who fled to the court of the Hungarian king, Sigismund of Luxembourg. A new stanak was held to elect Ostoja's successor at the end of May. Ragusan authorities proposed Hrvoje or, alternatively, the exiled nobleman Pavle Radišić as the next king. Unexpectedly, the stanak concluded with the election of Tvrtko II, who had been completely ignored in the previous royal elections. It is not known who advocated his accession, but he must have owed it to Hrvoje and Sandalj. The choice was likely helped by Tvrtko II's parentage, as well as the expectance that he would not hinder the nobility's autonomy.

In June, Tvrtko's supporters defeated a Hungarian army and thus prevented Ostoja from reclaiming the crown, but the chief royal residence of Bobovac and the Usoran town of Srebrenik were captured and restored to Ostoja. All major Bosnian noble families remained loyal to Tvrtko, while Ostoja functioned as Sigismund's puppet whose territory included little more than Bobovac. The fortress, however, housed the crown, which Tvrtko was not able to reach.

Much like they intended, Tvrtko II's first reign was marked by an absolute domination of Sandalj and Hrvoje over the entire kingdom. Tvrtko authorized Hrvoje to settle disputes and issue orders in his name, and for a while, as a puppet king, he had his court in Hrvoje's land near the river Sana. The King probably had no choice but to grant to Hrvoje Bosnia's most lucrative mining town, Srebrenica, in 1405, after which it never returned to royal domain. Sandalj, on the other hand, seized the opportunity to take over the land that belonged to Ostoja's favourites, the Sanković family, thus making the Kosačas the greatest landowners in the southern part of the kingdom. When Hrvoje induced him to support King Ladislaus of Naples' claim to the Hungarian throne, Tvrtko became even more of a thorn in Sigismund's side. The struggle between Ostoja and Tvrtko II for the Bosnian crown thus represents a phase of a much broader civil war between the supporters of Sigismund and Ladislaus.

Following a few minor disputes with the maritime republics of Venice and Ragusa over Konavli and Pomorje, Tvrtko gained recognition as legitimate king from both states. By 1406, Ostoja was losing what little support he had left in Bosnia, with the nobility now unanimously favouring Tvrtko, but the former king's decision to remain in the country continued to trouble Tvrtko. Ragusans described the beginning of Tvrtko II's reign as more tumultuous than anything "since the Flood", but he soon succeeded in uniting the country by bringing together his feuding vassals.

== Downfall ==
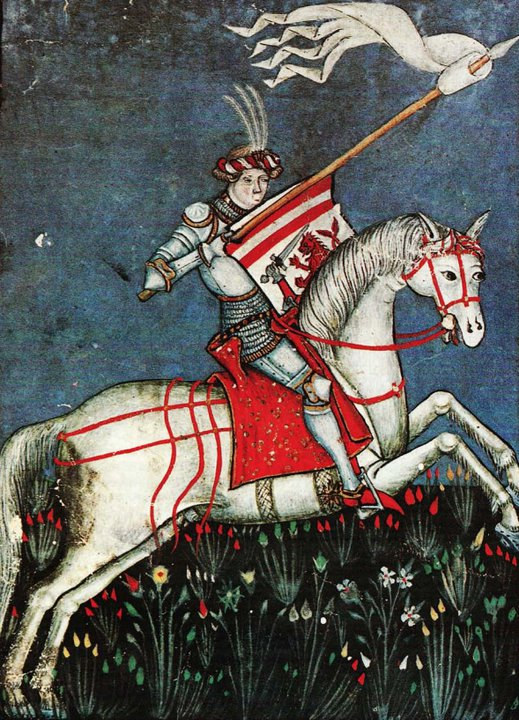
Hrvoje Vukčić Hrvatinić as depicted in Hrvoje's Missal

Hungarian attacks on Bosnia took place annually, making Tvrtko's life "a constant hassle". The conflict culminated in September 1408, when Sigismund achieved a decisive victory over Tvrtko's troops: 170 minor noblemen were captured and killed in Dobor – tossed over the city walls. Tvrtko is said to have been captured as well, but this does not appear to be true, as he demanded the customary tribute from the Ragusans in February 1409. The hostilities continued until the end of November, with Tvrtko retreating southwards with his noblemen and resisting Hungarian attacks, which enabled Ostoja to reestablish control over Central Bosnia.

By January 1409, the news of King Ladislaus' intention to sell his rights to Dalmatia to Venice had reached Hrvoje, who had been promised the land as governor in Ladislaus' name. Hrvoje no longer had reason to support Ladislaus against Sigismund and made peace with the latter, followed by most Bosnian noblemen. Tvrtko and Sandalj remained in Ladislaus' camp, which led to a civil war. Ostoja seized the opportunity to try to reclaim the throne, but Sigismund too intended to have himself crowned King of Bosnia "in the solemn manner of Tvrtko I". Sigismund's claim to Bosnia, derived from his agreement with the Rusag in 1394, was recognized by Hrvoje, while Sandalj crossed over to Ostoja.

Tvrtko remained on the throne until mid-1409, when Ostoja prevailed. Sigismund's claim became untenable, but Bosnians acknowledged his overlordship over Ostoja; only Tvrtko refused to submit to the King of Hungary. He appears to have evaded capture by Hungarian troops by fleeing to the mountains of northern Zachlumia. In December Ragusan officials wrote letters to him and his wife (of whom nothing is known) in response to his request of Saint Demetrius income; at the time he still resided in Bosnia. After that Tvrtko faded into obscurity and had no part in Bosnian affairs for several years. He is known to have lived in 1414 near the Republic of Ragusa, on lands belonging to Pavle Radenović, the brother of Ostoja's wife Kujava. Another possibility is that he sought shelter with the Ottoman Turks.

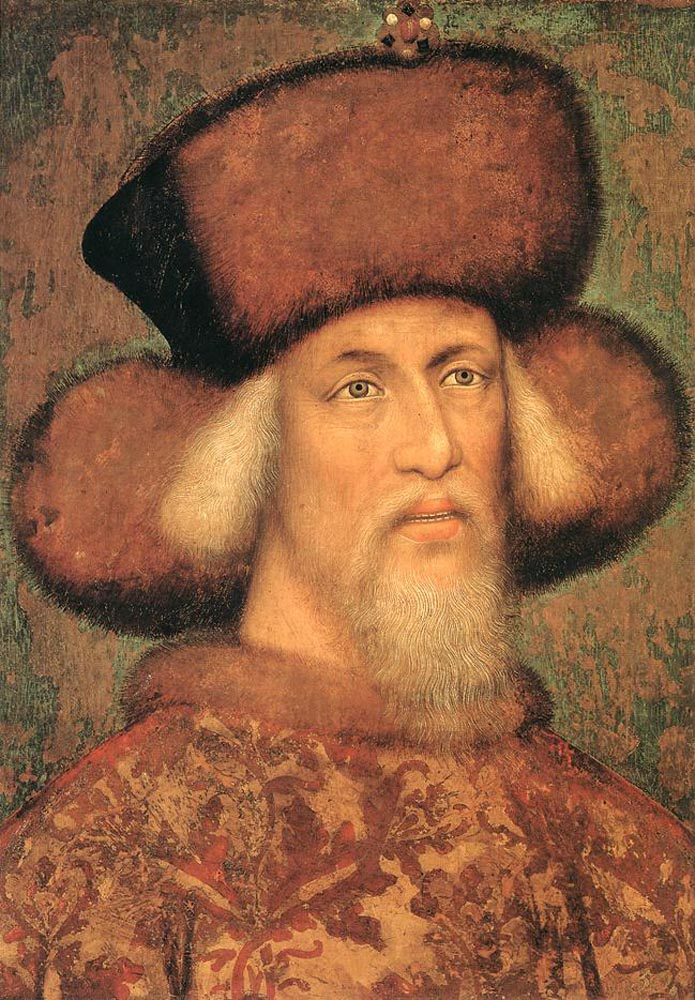
Sigismund of Luxembourg

In early 1413, Hrvoje angered Sigismund by plundering Sandalj's lands. Their relationship deteriorated to the point when Hrvoje found it necessary to turn to the Turks for help. First Turkish troops brought terror to Bosnia in May 1414; in August they also brought the deposed monarch, Tvrtko, and set him up as anti-king. His alliance with the Turks may be due to their mutual hostility towards Sigismund. Pavle Radenović immediately declared for Tvrtko, but no other major nobleman appears to have followed his example – not even Hrvoje. Ragusa tried to maintain cordial relations with both men, calling Tvrtko king out of fear of the Turks but addressing Ostoja as the "rightful king". In the following skirmishes the Turks replaced Sigismund as the greatest external influence in the country, but proved to have no intention to actually restore Tvrtko on the throne. Pavle's support was not enough to achieve this goal.

With Turkish raids against Bosnia and at times against his own regions of Croatia and Dalmatia continuing, Sigismund decided to take action and mobilize his army. While Tvrtko hoped for a Turkish victory, Ostoja expected that a Hungarian triumph would rid him of Turkish raiders and secure his position against both his rival and his ambitious magnates. The Battle of Doboj in August 1415 saw the disastrous defeat of Sigismund's army. Contrary to expectations, however, the Turks recognized Ostoja as legitimate king. Tvrtko lost his ground, while the united Bosnians for the first time shifted their allegiance from Hungary to the Ottomans. After Pavle Radenović was assassinated in retribution for his support of Tvrtko, the latter again disappeared from spotlight. Ostoja's position became even stronger when he made peace with Pavle's sons and with Hrvoje's death the following year.

== Second reign ==
Ostoja died in September 1418. Despite expectations that Tvrtko would take over, Ostoja's son Stephen was elected king. When the Turks broke into the kingdom in early 1420, Tvrtko once again accompanied them and installed himself as anti-king. Sandalj immediately declared for him. Fearing the Ottomans, Sandalj's example was soon followed by other noblemen. In June Tvrtko convoked a stanak, and Ragusa recognized him as king. He had support of almost all nobility in Visoko, including voivod Vukmir, mayor Dragiša, knez Juraj Vojsalić, knez Pribić, knez Radič Radojević, knez Batić Mirković, knez Juraj Dragičević, knez Petar Klešić, voivod Ivko, and voivod Pavao Jurjević. By the end of the year Tvrtko had completely ousted Stephen, who continued to advance his claim until the summer of 1421. He appears to have died soon after. The internal troubles forced the Ottomans to withdraw their troops from Bosnia, which enabled Tvrtko to strengthen his hold on the kingdom and for its economy to recover. Tvrtko's second accession had to be legitimized with a new coronation, which took place during a stanak in August 1421. After the formal investiture he finally confirmed his predecessors' charters and privileges granted to Ragusan merchants.

Tvrtko's second reign was marked by his quick resolution to restore royal authority and the king's pre-eminence among Bosnia's feudal rulers. With Hrvoje and Pavle gone, and Sandalj preoccupied by conflict with Pavle's sons, Tvrtko was able to significantly expand the royal domain. The convenient death of King Stephen also somewhat neutralized the threat posed by his intriguing mother, Queen Kujava. The Ottomans found little time to interfere with Tvrtko's government in the following five years, giving him time to strengthen the kingdom's economy, with mines reaching the height of their productivity and the number of foreign merchants considerably increasing. In 1422 Tvrtko signed a beneficial trade treaty with the Republic of Venice in December 1422, and discussed a range of plans for joint military action against Sigismund in Dalmatia. He was obliged, however to renounce the Bosnian claim to Dalmatian cities under Venetian rule. His attempts to find a suitable Catholic bride from the Venetian Malatesta family through the mediation of Peter of Pag, Archbishop of Split, were promising, but never materialized.

Tvrtko's association with Venice bothered not only Ragusa, but also the Turks; the former resented losing their monopoly on trade, while the latter's poor relationship with Venice was the result of territorial dispute over Albania and Zeta. The Turks proceeded to raid Bosnia in the spring of 1424, just enough to make it clear to Tvrtko that close relations with Venice would not be tolerated. Tvrtko understood that Venice would not be able to provide him with help against the Turks, and thus slowly dismantled their alliance.

Although the cooling of Tvrtko's relations with Venice suited Ragusa, another incident guaranteed that the city-state and the King would not be on friendly terms for some more time. In 1424, a kinsman of Tvrtko named Vuk Banić unsuccessfully attempted to usurp the throne with the help of Tvrtko's aunt, Queen Kujava, who wished to avenge her son's deposition. Ragusa had a long-standing tradition of granting political asylum to members of ruling families, and did not fail to accommodate Vuk when he sought sanctuary. The same year, while the Turks were raiding the neighbouring Despotate of Serbia, Tvrtko decided to reclaim Srebrenica, which had been seized by Sigismund in 1411 and granted to his ally, the Serbian ruler Stefan Lazarević. The local Ragusan merchants assisted the Serbs, and the project failed; Stefan's victorious troops went on to plunder Tvrtko's realm when the Turks retreated from their land.

=== Hungarian alliance ===
The Kingdom of Bosnia and the Despotate of Serbia in 1422

In 1425, Tvrtko realized that he needed a strong ally in the event of further Turkish attacks. Aware that he could not count on Venice, he decided to improve relations with Hungary, which resulted in a treaty the same or the following year. The Ottomans responded with severe attacks that forced Tvrtko to accept their suzerainty and to agree to paying an annual tribute. The Turks departed in 1426, and he became even more desperate to form an alliance with Hungary. Tvrtko's unfavourable position enabled Sigismund to demand the recognition of the latter's father-in-law, Hermann II of Celje, as heir presumptive to the childless king. Hermann was the son of Tvrtko's aunt Catherine, but was first and foremost a Hungarian count whose kingship was very undesirable to Bosnian nobility. Vuk Banić again presented himself as pretender, and Tvrtko realized that the tide was turning against him. He decided to push the alliance with Hungarian even further, not only recognizing Hermann as his heir presumptive in the fall of 1427, but also negotiating a Hungarian marriage. The chosen bride was Dorothy Garai, daughter of the Ban of Usora. Sandalj and the Zlatonosović family voiced their opposition by shunning the wedding festivities in 1428. Tvrtko eventually reconciled with Sandalj, but took action against the Zlatonosovićs and confiscated their land.

Vuk never posed as much threat to Tvrtko as would Radivoj, the elder illegitimate son of the long-deceased Ostoja. In 1432, Stefan Lazarević's successor Đurađ, Sandalj and the Ottomans helped Radivoj lay claim to the throne and take control of much of the country. Tvrtko's only noteworthy support came from Hrvoje's nephew and successor, Juraj Vojsalić, and he thus managed to retain only the central and northwestern Bosnia. Tvrtko retreated to Visoko, but soon found that Sandalj had become too ill to support Radivoj's cause. Đurađ Branković, satisfied with annexing the lands Tvrtko had confiscated from the Zlatonosović family, also lost interest in Radivoj. The Ottomans, however, pursued Radivoj's claim and took possession of Bobovac in his name in 1434.

After years of pleading for their help, Tvrtko finally saw Hungarians march into Bosnia in mid-1434. They recovered for him Jajce, Hodidjed, Bočac and the Komotin Castle, but he lost it all as soon as they retreated. In fact, he himself appears to have left with the troops on their way back to Hungary, as he is known to have resided at the court in Buda in 1435. Radivoj ceased being a threat when he lost the Ottoman support that year, while Sandalj's death presented Tvrtko with a new and more vital rebellious vassal in the form of Sandalj's nephew and successor, Stjepan Vukčić Kosača.

=== Later life ===
Radivoj styled himself as King of Bosnia for the remainder of Tvrtko II's reign. He was nominally supported by the Turks and by Stjepan Vukčić Kosača; they could have easily deposed Tvrtko in his favour if they wished, but it appears that their only goal was to weaken and divide Bosnia for their future benefit. While Stjepan was trying to expand his territory at the expense of Zeta in 1443, Tvrtko took advantage of his absence and the Ottoman concern with the Crusade of Varna to attack his land, but Stjepan returned in time to defend it.

Tvrtko died childless in November 1443, having expressed wish to be succeeded by his politically inactive and until then rather obscure cousin Thomas, Radivoj's younger brother and likewise an illegitimate son of Ostoja. Hermann II of Celje had died in 1435, and his heirs made no attempt to enforce the 1427 succession agreement. Given that the succession went smoothly, it can be assumed that Tvrtko actively worked on securing Thomas's accession, probably in order to ensure that his patrimony would not pass to the detested Radivoj.

Tvrtko II maintained himself on the Bosnian throne longer than any of the monarchs who followed Tvrtko I. He also did more to restore royal dignity and centralize the state than any other, leaving a strong mark on Bosnia's politics, economy and culture.

== Personal life ==
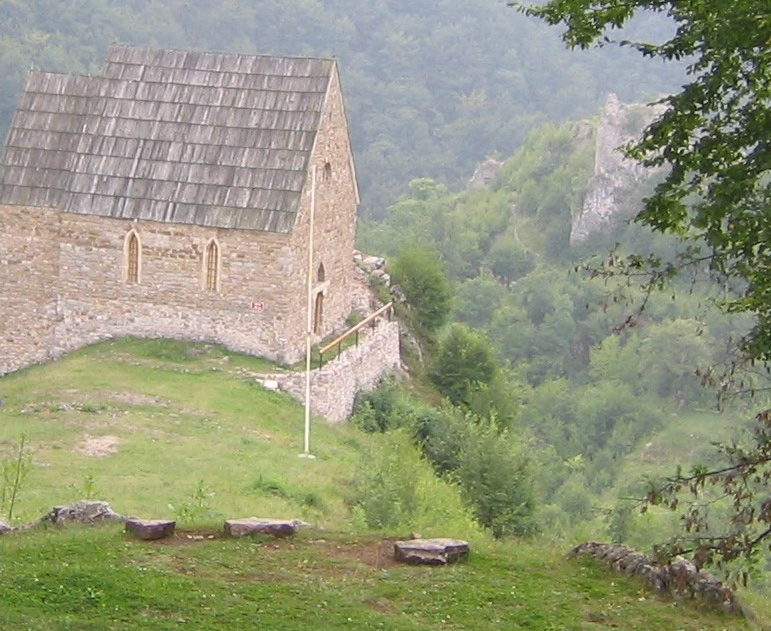
Reconstructed chapel in Bobovac

Stephen Tvrtko II was married during his first reign; his wife was mentioned by the Ragusans in 1409 as "the Queen, wife of King Tvrtko of Bosnia", but her name was not recorded. During his second reign, he considered it very important to marry a Catholic noblewoman and entertained the idea of choosing a bride from the Italian House of Malatesta. The collapse of his alliance with Venice meant that the plan was never realized.

Tvrtko eventually married the Hungarian noblewoman Dorothy Garai, but not before assuring the papacy of his commitment to the Roman Catholic Church. The wedding was held in Milodraž between 23 and 31 July 1428, and the marriage lasted until her death in September 1438. The sources do not mention that the couple had any children, but archaeological excavations in the royal chapel in Bobovac during the second half of the 20th century confirmed the existence of a child's tomb located between the tombs of the royal couple, indicating that they might have had a child who died in infancy or early childhood.

Tvrtko was a Roman Catholic, but only because it suited him to be one. He appreciated the Franciscans for their socio-political engagements in Bosnia, but no more than high-ranking officials of the "heretical" Bosnian Church. The head of the Bosnian Church was always favoured by Tvrtko, and exerted significant influence on the matters of state, serving as Tvrtko's adviser even in 1428, while Tvrtko was trying to present himself as a good Catholic.

== Family tree ==
Stephen I
Stephen II	Vladislav
Catherine	Tvrtko I	Ostoja
Hermann	Tvrtko II	Stephen	Radivoj	Thomas

Regnal titles
Preceded by Ostoja	King of Bosnia; 1404–09	Succeeded by Ostoja
Preceded by Stephen Ostojić	King of Bosnia; 1420–43 with Radivoj as anti-king (1433-35)	Succeeded by Thomas
