= Komotin Fort =

Castle in Jajce Municipality, Bosnia

Coordinates: 44.405556°N 17.318056°E

Komotin Fortress
- Jajce, Bosnia and Herzegovina

Location

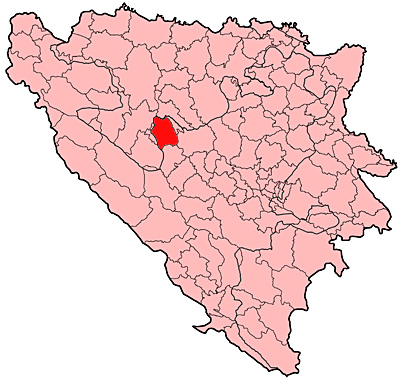
Jajce Municipality

Komotin Castle is a ruined castle in Bosnia and Herzegovina, in the Jajce Municipality.

== Background ==
Komotin is believed to have been built in the early 14th century. The last Bosnian King Stephen Tomašević issued a charter which gave Komotin to his uncle Radivoj Kotromanić.

The architecture shows that komotin was a manorial court, but its positioning high on a hill that was difficult to access other than by narrow winding paths made it easily defendable. Once intruders and invaders had gotten up the path they then had a moat to contend with that could only be crossed by drawbridge. The walls of the manor were between 1.2 and 1.4 metres (3.9 and 4.6 ft) thick, with a rectangular shape. Within the walls was also a large and small bailey, plus quarters and accommodations.

== Protection ==
As of late the castle has been deemed important as a national monument and has been listed as a protected building.
