= Jelena Nelipić =

Queen consort of Bosnia
- Tenure: 1416–1418
- Died: 1422
- Spouse: Hrvoje Vukčić Hrvatinić; Stephen Ostoja of Bosnia
- House: Nelipić
- Father: Ivan Nelipčić
- Mother: Margareta Merini

Jelena Nelipić; died 1422) was Duchess of Split by her first marriage and Queen of Bosnia by her second marriage. By birth, she was a member of the Croatian Nelipić noble family, having estates in Dalmatian Zagora.

Jelena was the daughter of Prince Ivan Nelipčić and his wife Margareta. Her father was son of Ivan I Nelipac, and her mother Margareta was descended from the noble family Merini of Split. Her brother Ivan III Nelipac was Ban of Croatia who ruled from mountain Velebit to Cetina river.

== Duchess of Split ==
In 1401, Jelena married Prince Hrvoje Vukčić Hrvatinić, a most prominent member of the Bosnian Hrvatinić noble family, and the strongest of the three main feudal lords of medieval Bosnia, bringing with her a significant dowry. Hrvoje Vukčić Hrvatinić was Herceg of Split, Grand Duke of Bosnia and Knyaz of Donji Kraji. Two years later, she became Duchess of Split when her husband was bestowed the title Duke of Split. Jelena was Roman Catholic, but her husband was a member of the Bosnian Church.

In 1416, Jelena's husband died. Being a wealthy widow left in charge with her late husband's territories, Jelena immediately became subject of marriage proposals.

== Queen of Bosnia ==
Duchess Jelena married King Stephen Ostoja of Bosnia, thus becoming Queen of Bosnia. Her dowry included her first husband's possessions, such as the royal town of Jajce, and this dowry is the reason why Stephen Ostoja, who had divorced his second wife Kujava in 1415, married her. Her second husband was also a member of the Bosnian Church.

== Second widowhood ==
Jelena's second marriage lasted much shorter than her first one. She became a widow again in 1418, after only two years of marriage. Her husband's successor was Stephen Ostojić, his son by his second wife Kujava. As dowager queen, Jelena had neither influence nor power. Kujava, the new king's mother and the second wife of Jelena's second husband, became powerful once again. Jelena's second widowhood was marked by conflicts with Kujava. The conflicts were ended in the summer of 1419, when Queen Jelena was imprisoned by her stepson. Three years later, Queen Jelena died in prison under mysterious circumstances.

== Issue ==
It's possible that Balša Hercegović was Jelena's son from her first marriage, but it's not clear yet. Other than him, who could have been her child, Jelena had no other known children by either of her husbands.

Royal titles
Vacant Title last held by Kujava Radenović	Queen consort of Bosnia; 1416–1418	Vacant Title next held by Dorothea Garai
