= Stephen Ostojić of Bosnia =

Stephen

King of Bosnia
- Reign: 1418–1420
- Predecessor: Ostoja
- Successor: Tvrtko II
- House: House of Kotromanić
- Father: Ostoja, King of Bosnia
- Mother: Kujava Radinović

Stephen Ostojić (Serbo-Croatian: Stjepan/Stefan Ostojić / Стјепан/Стефан Остојић) was King of Bosnia from the death of his father Ostoja in 1418 until his deposition by the nobility in 1420.

== Youth ==
A member of the House of Kotromanić, Stephen was the only legitimate son of King Ostoja, born by his second wife, Kujava Radinović. His parents married in 1399, while Stephen first appears in historical records in late 1408 as endorser of his father's donation to the noble brothers Vukić and Juraj Radivojević for their loyal service. Along with his mother, Stephen next endorsed his father's charter of privileges to the Republic of Ragusa in 1409. King Ostoja repudiated Queen Kujava in 1416, and it appears that Stephen left him too; the 16th-century Ragusan chronicler Mavro Orbini claimed that Stephen was mentioned as Ostoja's opponent in 1417. Ostoja remarried immediately, taking the wealthy widow Jelena Nelipić as his third wife. By 22 July 1417, Stephen reconciled with his father and, with his stepmother, endorsed another Ostoja's donation to the Radivojević brothers, who had helped suppress a rebellion by Humljans. Stephen was given authority over them.

== Reign ==
King Ostoja died in 1418 and the stanak was convoked to recognize Stephen as the new king. He immediately restored his mother's royal honours and had his stepmother imprisoned. Stephen's first act as king was to notify Ragusa of his election and claim tributes now due to him. An Ottoman raid enabled the Ragusans to stall the payment. Stephen took into his service Miho Kaboga (of the Ragusan Kaboga family), a former protovestijar of Grand Duke Hrvoje Vukčić Hrvatinić, and soon fell under his influence, which the nobility resented. Kaboga urged him to conquer the Ragusan city of Ston, claiming it was not strongly fortified and that the peninsula of Pelješac was not protected. Stephen claimed the Hrvatinić house in Ragusa, as well as the coast surrounding Slano and all the "royal goods", but eventually relented. After a council with his mother and the nobility in the town of Zvečaj in March 1419, Stephen confirmed the privileges granted to Ragusa by his predecessors. The same year he confirmed the sale of Konavli and the Sokol Fortress of his vassal Sandalj Hranić Kosača to Ragusa.

In September 1419, Stephen offered an alliance to the Republic of Venice in all their wars, and then enjoyed their war for Albania against Balša III. The conflict strained his relations with his vassal Kosača, Balša's stepfather and protector, but the two did not engage directly. When the Ottoman army led by Ishak Bey launched a raid against Bosnia, specifically targeting the domains of Stephen and his maternal relatives and supporters, the Pavlović noble family, Kosača took the opportunity to turn against Stephen and declare his support for the former king Tvrtko II, his cousin and father's long-time rival supported by the Ottomans. Other magnates followed him. Stephen had been formally deposed by August 1420. The last extant document mentioning him dates from April 1421, when he offered a renewal of alliance to Venice.

Regnal titles
Preceded by Ostoja	King of Bosnia; 1418–1420	Succeeded by Tvrtko II
