= Pavlovića Zemlja =

Medieval region of Bosnia and Herzegovina

Pavlovićs' Zemlja Zemlja Pavlovića
- Zemlja of Bosnian Banate then Kingdom
- earliest mention 14th c.–1463
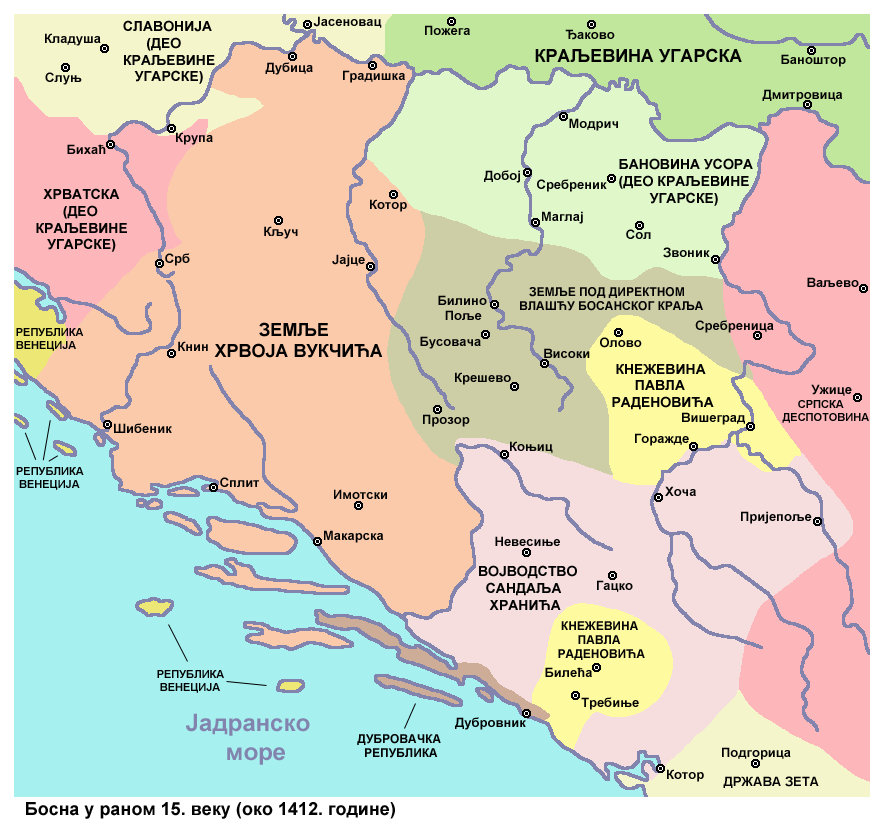
- Pavlovića Zemlja in yellow, as part of medieval Bosnian state.
- Capital: Borač, Pavlovac, (Klobuk, southern stronghold)
- Area
  - Coordinates: 43.750883980977456°N 18.778389074338524°E
- Status: Zemlja
- Government
  - Type: Feudal
  - HQ: Borač; Pavlovac; Klobukr
- Knyaz
  - 1391–1415: Pavle Radinović
  - 1415–1420: Petar I Pavlović
  - 1420–1441: Radosav Pavlović
  - 1441–1450: Ivaniš Pavlović
  - 1450–1463: Petar II Pavlović with brother Nikola Pavlović
- Legislature
  - noble family: Radinović
  - cadet branch: Pavlović
- Historical era: Medieval Bosnia
  - Established: earliest mention 14th c.
  - Disestablished: 1463
- Contained within
  - Banate: Banate of Bosnia
  - Kingdom: Kingdom of Bosnia
- Subdivisions
  - Type: Župas, opština, town, village
  - Units: Rogatica; Prača; Gradina fort near Pale; Vrhbosna; Hodidjed; Glasinac; Olovo; Brodar; Višegrad; Priboj; Dobrun; Vratar fort; Petrič fort; Klobuk; Trebinje; Cavtat
Succeeded by
Sanjak of Bosnia
- Today part of: Bosnia and Herzegovina

The Pavlovićs' Zemlja, (Serbo-Croatian: Pavlovića Zemlja, or Zemlja Pavlovića), is a historical zemlja that arose in the Middle Ages as well-defined administrative unit of medieval Bosnia ruled by the Pavlović dynasty. It included most of today's eastern Bosnia, and some territories on the south of the country, around Trebinje, in Bosansko Primorje and in Konavle. The name of Pavlović land is taken from the patronymic, which was borne by two generations of Pavle Radinović's descendants and administrative sub-division term "zemlja". The seat of Pavlović family was in the town and fortress of Borač and later nearby Pavlovac, which were both located on the left bank of the river Prača, between Mesići and Prača.

== History ==
Knez Pavle Radinović, after whom the zemlja of Pavlović is called, ruled the area in eastern Bosnia. The more significant expansion of Pavle's territory began in 1391, when the Sanković family sold the state territory, which the king could only decide on, without the consent of the king. On the order of King Stjepan Dabiša and the nobles, Pavle with Duke Vlatko Vuković occupied Konavle and expanded his possessions, controlling customs town on Ledenice with Vlatko. In Bosnia, he expanded his territories as far as Olovo in the west, while in the east his territory reached as far as Banja, where it can be seen from the Dubrovnik archive records that, in 1405, the seat of the bishopric of Dabar-Bosna was under the rule of Knez Pavle. He was killed in a conspiracy of King Ostoja (first reign 1398-1404, second reign 1409-1418), duke Sandalj (1392-1435) and Zlatonosović during a walk in Parena poljana between royal court in Sutjeska and Bobovac royal fortress-town, after which he was succeeded by his elder son Petar I (1415-1420).

After the death of Pavle Radinović, his land was divided, and a long-term war between the brothers Petar I and Radosav Pavlović o one side, and Sandalj Hranić, head of Kosača on the other, ensued. In the Hum zemlja, the territory of Pavlović was confined by the territory of Kosača, and there the border changed depending on the changing relations between these two families. The narrowing of the territory began with the sale of half of Konavle to Dubrovnik in 1426 (sealed by peace in 1432) and the loss of Trebinje and the župa of Vrm in 1438, when it was occupied by Stjepan Vukčić.

In the first attack of the Ottomans' army in 1463, the lands of Pavlović and their vassals Kovačevćs, later branch of Dinjčićs, were conquered. With the fall of Bosnia in the same year, the Ottomans named the Pavlovićs' Zemlja "Villajet Pavli" and divided it into 11 nahiyahs, which included Višegrad, Dobrun, Hrtar, Brodar, Prača called Čataldža, Volujak, Borač, Studena, Glasinac or Mokro, Pale and Olovci (Olovo). The seat of the vilayet was placed in Višegrad.

== Land possession ==
Seats of the family were:

- Borač
- Pavlovac

The župas, towns, villages and lands of Pavlovićs' included:

- Rogatica
- Prača
- Gradina fort near Pale
- Hodidjed
- Vrhbosna
- Glasinac — on Crkvina near Sokolac, northwest of Borač;
- Olovo — on the river Stupčanica;
- Brodar — to the east of Borač, along the Drina river downstream from Međeđa;
- Višegrad
- Priboj
- Dobrun
- Vratar fort — at the confluence of the river Žepa and the Drina;
- Petrič fort — on the Drina downstream from Perućac;
- Klobuk — family's most important southern stronghold;
- Trebinje
- Cavtat

They had several custom and mining towns, or owned mins in the vicinity of important townships, the most important of which were at:

- Olovo
- Drijeva
- mines around Fojnica

== See also ==
- Bosna Zemlja
- Humska Zemlja
- Donji Kraji
- Usora
- Soli

== Bibliography ==
- Blagojević, Miloš (2003). "Državnost zemlje Pavlovića". Zemlja Pavlovića: Srednji vijek i period turske vladavine. Banja Luka: ANURS. pp. 113–144. ISBN 978-99938-631-1-3.
- Isailović, Neven (2017). "Prilog o delovanju kneza i vojvode Petra Pavlovića u bosansko-ugarsko-turskim sukobima početkom XV veka" (PDF). Istorijski časopis. 66: 173–208.
- Maliković, Dragi (2003). "Pavlovići i Turci". Zemlja Pavlovića: Srednji vijek i period turske vladavine. Banja Luka: ANURS. pp. 171–201. ISBN 978-99938-631-1-3.
- Nilević, Boris (1978). "Vojvoda Ivaniš Pavlović" (PDF). Prilozi. 14 (14–15). Institut za istoriju, Sarajevo: 349–361. Archived from the original (PDF) on 2022-01-29.
- Nilević, Boris (2010). "Poslednji Pavlovići - Bosna sredinom XV stoljeća" (PDF). Historijska Traganja. 5: 13–64. Archived from the original (PDF) on 2023-11-06.
- Rokai, Peter (2003a). "Pavlovići i ugarski kraljevi". Zemlja Pavlovića: Srednji vijek i period turske vladavine. Banja Luka: ANURS. pp. 161–169.
- Sulejmanagić, Amer (2012). "Grb Pavlovića". Bosna Franciscana. 36: 165–206. Archived from the original on December 19, 2024.
- Tošić, Đuro (2001). "Vojvoda Petar Pavlović: Prilog istoriji Bosne početkom XV vijeka". Jugoslovenski istorijski časopis. 34 (1–2): 35–46.
- Tošić, Đuro (2003a). "Glasinac u zemlji Pavlovića". Zemlja Pavlovića: Srednji vijek i period turske vladavine. Banja Luka: ANURS. pp. 77–90. ISBN 978-99938-631-1-3.
- Tošić, Đuro (2003b). "Pavlovića dio drijevske carine". Zemlja Pavlovića: Srednji vijek i period turske vladavine. Banja Luka: ANURS. pp. 235–245.
- Tošić, Đuro (2003c). "Pismo dubrovačkog poslanika Ivana Gundulića o smrti kneza Pavla Radenovića". Zemlja Pavlovića: Srednji vijek i period turske vladavine. Banja Luka: ANURS. pp. 357–366. ISBN 978-99938-631-1-3.
- Ćirković, Sima (1964a). Istorija srednjovekovne bosanske države. Beograd: Srpska književna zadruga.
- Ćirković, Sima (1964b). "Sugubi venac: Prilog istoriji kraljevstva u Bosni". Zbornik Filozofskog fakulteta u Beogradu. 8 (1): 343–370.
- Ćirković, Sima (1964v). Herceg Stefan Vukčić-Kosača i njegovo doba. Beograd: Naučno delo.
- Ćirković, Sima (1982). "Pad Bosne i pokušaji otpora turskom osvajanju". Istorija srpskog naroda. Vol. 2. Београд: Српска књижевна задруга. pp. 390–402.
- Ćirković, Sima (2003). "Pavlovića zemlja (Contrata dei Paulovich): Postanak i razvitak velikaške teritorije". Zemlja Pavlovića: Srednji vijek i period turske vladavine. Banja Luka: ANURS. pp. 37–45.
- Ćorović, Vladimir (1940). Historija Bosne. Beograd: Srpska kraljevska akademija.
- Šabanović, Hazim (1959). Bosanski pašaluk: Postanak i upravna podjela. Sarajevo: Naučno društvo Bosne i Hercegovine.
