= Radoslav Pavlović Radinović =

15th century Bosnian nobleman

Gospodin Radoslav Pavlović
- Grand Duke of Bosnia
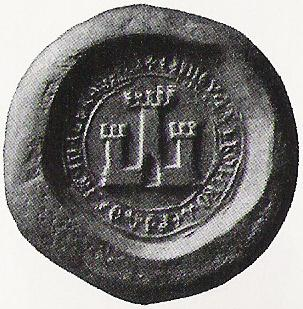

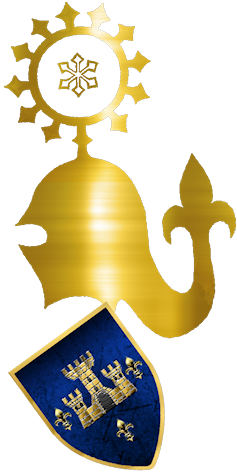
- Coat of arms
- Predecessor: Petar I Pavlović
- Successor: Ivaniš Radoslavić
- Full name: Radoslav Pavlović Radinović
- Native name: Radosav Pavlović
- Died: 1441
- Buried: Pavlovac hill, near Lukavica
- Residence: Pavlovac
- Locality: Prača
- Wars and battles: First Konavle War
- Family: Pavlović-Radinović
- Spouse: Teodora Kosača
- Issue: Petar II, Ivaniš, Nikola
- Father: Pavle Radinović

Radoslav Pavlović (Serbian Cyrillic: Радослав Павловић; died 1441), sometimes spelled Radislav, Radisav or Radosav, was a Bosnian nobleman of the noble family Pavlović-Radinović. He inherited title of knez from his father Pavle Radinović (d. 1415) upon his father death, while his older brother Petar (1415–1420), being the first in order of precedence, was bestowed a title of duke by the Bosnian throne. He and his brother also inherited their father's estates in the eastern parts of the Kingdom of Bosnia. After the murder of his father Pavle Radinović on Parena Poljana, near Sutjeska and Bobovac, in 1415 by the hand of Grand Duke of Bosnia, Sandalj Hranić (1392–1435), Radosav together with his older brother Peter, started a war against Sandalj Hranić and his Kosača clan, as those responsible for the murder. After the death of his older brother Petar in the conflict with the Ottomans in 1420, Radosav assumed leadership over the Pavlović's clan and took over the title of duke, and around 1421 he was bestowed a title of Grand Duke of Bosnia by the throne. He ended the conflicts with the Kosača and sealed the peace with a marriage with the daughter of Vukac Hranić, princess Teodora, the sister of the future Kosača's clan chieftain, Stjepan Vukčić (1435–1466), with whom he had three sons. In 1426, he sold his part of Konavle to the Republic of Ragusa for 18,000 perpers, but in 1430 he started the so-called First Konavle War over the sold territories, which ended in 1432 with the recognition of the situation from the beginning of the conflict. In 1435, after the death of Duke Sandalj Hranić, he tried to take advantage of the new situation, but in a conflict with his wife's brother Stjepan, he eventually lost the southern parts of his zemlja around Trebinje. He died in 1441, and was succeeded by his son Ivaniš Radoslavić Pavlović (1441–1450).

== Rise of Radosav ==
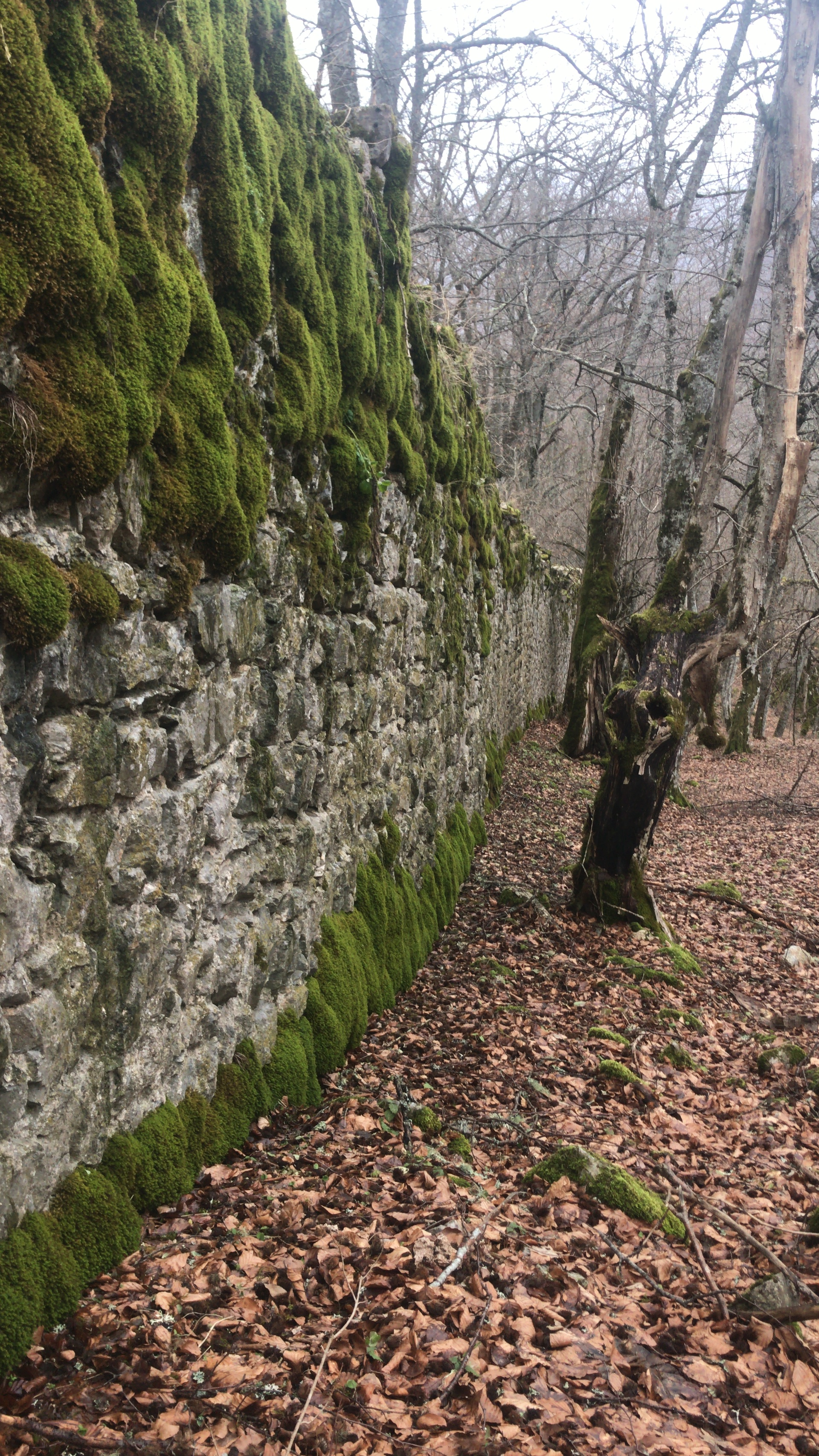
Walls of Pavlovac, family's medieval capital.

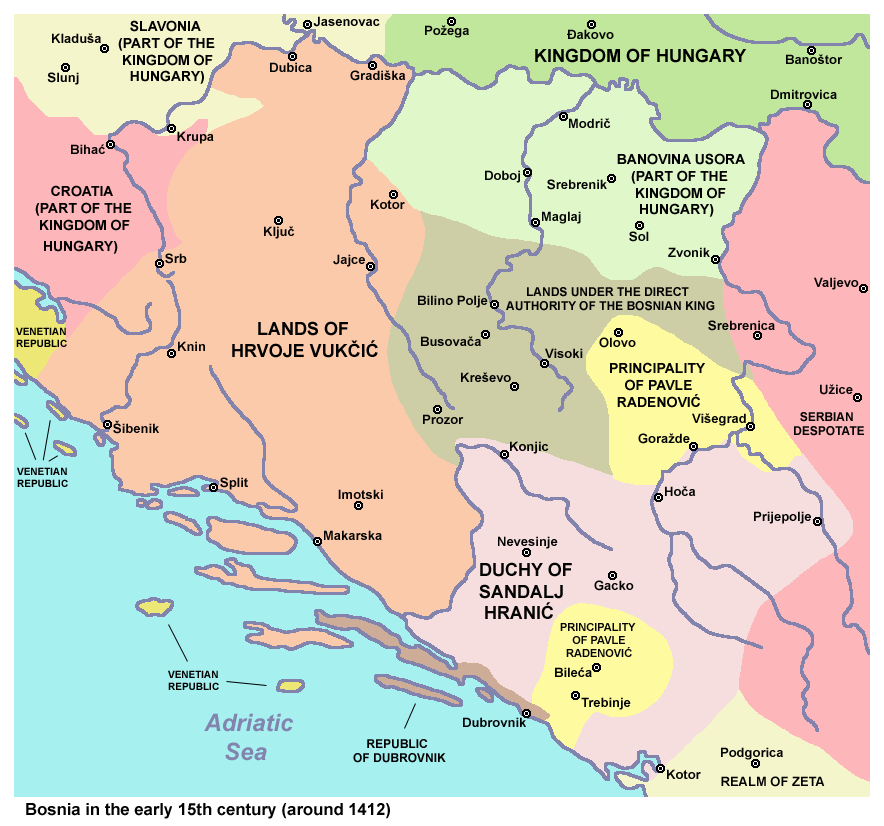
Zemlja of Pavle Radinović, also known as Pavlovića Zemlja (transl. Pavlovićs' Land) in the early 15th century (approx.)

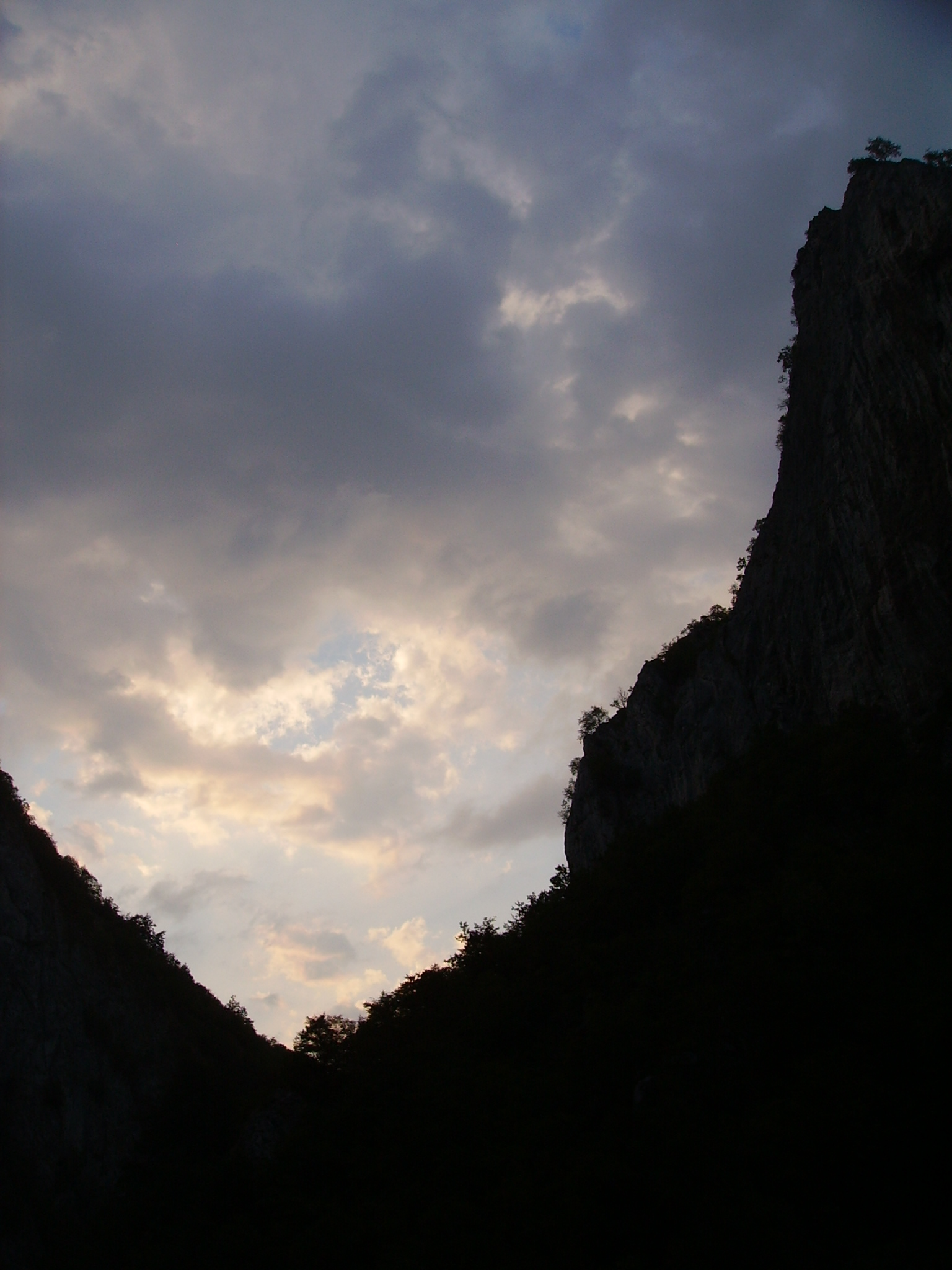
Unsurpassable slopes of the Prača river canyon were natural stronghold, where Pavlovićs' capitals Borač and Pavlovac were located.

After the end of the war with Hungary, in 1416, a stanak was held in Sutjeska, where, during a recess walk, knez Pavle Radinović was killed by the people of duke Sandalj Hranić and duke Vukmir Zlatonosović. Pavle's son, knez Petar, was taken to Bobovac, where he was supposed to be blinded. It is not known how Pavle Radinović's lands were supposed to be divided; all that is known is that Olovo was intended for Zlatonosović. However, Petar was not blinded but appeared in Borač castle, the capital of Pavlovićs. Although the circumstances are not known, it is possible that he managed to free himself and escape to the fortress. As early as November 1415, Sandalj felt threatened by Pavlovićs. Interestingly, there is no news about the position of Hrvoje Vukčić Hrvatinić at that time; once by far the most powerful Bosnian nobleman, already in decline for couple of years, died in April 1416. The main question, at that point in political life of the Bosnian Kingdom, was that of Hrvoje's successor. Hrvoje's son Balša died after several months of rule. A small part of Hrvoje's territories was inherited by his nephew Đurađ Vojsalić, son of Vojislav Vukčić. Most of it was taken over by King Ostoja, who divorced his wife Kujava and in the summer of 1416 married Hrvoje's widow Jelena. Before her marriage, Jelena gave the city of Omiš to her brother Ivaniš Nelipić. Sultan Mehmed I appeared at the end of 1416 in Bosnia, where he mediated in concluding peace among its feuding lords. At the stanak King Ostoja was accused of violating viru gospodsku (transl. a gentleman's honor / trust – transl. a sacred trust / oath - lit. Bona fides) by killing Pavle Radinović, but he managed to escape and avoid capture. He approached Sandalj, who was fighting against Pavlovićs, who were supported by sultan, but was losing the war and almost all his possessions in the Bosansko Primorje, except Dračevica and Novi. Ostoja died in September 1418. The Ottomans switched sides and were now helping Sandalj in attempt to partially regain the territories in Primorje. He regained his half of Konavle. Ostoja's son Stjepan Ostojić was elected the new king. Sandalj tried to sell his half of Konavle to the people of Dubrovnik. An agreement has been reached, and Konavle was sold for 12,000 ducats and 500 perpers of annual tribute. However, as soon as the people of Dubrovnik took over Konavle, an uprising broke out, and although it was quickly quelled, the Dubrovnik rule however did not consolidate. In December 1418, king Stjepan Ostojić issued a charter confirming the Dubrovnik's possession of the entire Konavle, together with the fortress of Soko.

In January 1420, the governor of Skopje, Ishak Bey, penetrated into Bosnia and attacked both Sandalj and Petar. At the end of January, Petar was killed in this fight, while Sandalj used the opportunity to occupy Petar's half of Konavle together with Soko fortress. He regained full control over Popovo Polje. Local lord and Sandalj's vassal, knez Grgur Vukosalić, the son of Vukosav Nikolić, had to flee for Dubrovnik, because he was on the side of Tvrtko II in these events, and against King Stephen Ostoja and his own lord, Grad Duke of Bosnia, Sandalj. To no avail the Nikolić family tried for generations to gain independence from the Bosnian duke, but even after Sandalj's death they had to remain loyal to his successor, Stjepan Vukčić. Sandalj regained his former strength and opposed King Stjepan Ostojić. In October 1420, peace was made with Radosav Pavlović, who supported the return of King Tvrtko II to the country. Ostojić was formally overthrown in the middle of 1420. He died before 1422, and this where all the historic information about him stop. Tvrtko II was crowned King of Bosnia in the middle of 1421. Peace between Hranić and Pavlović was made in 1423, and Sandalj returned the fortress of Soko in Konavle to the people of Dubrovnik. Radosav sealed the peace with Vukčić's by marrying Teodora, the daughter of Sandalj's brother Vukac.

== The first Konavle war ==
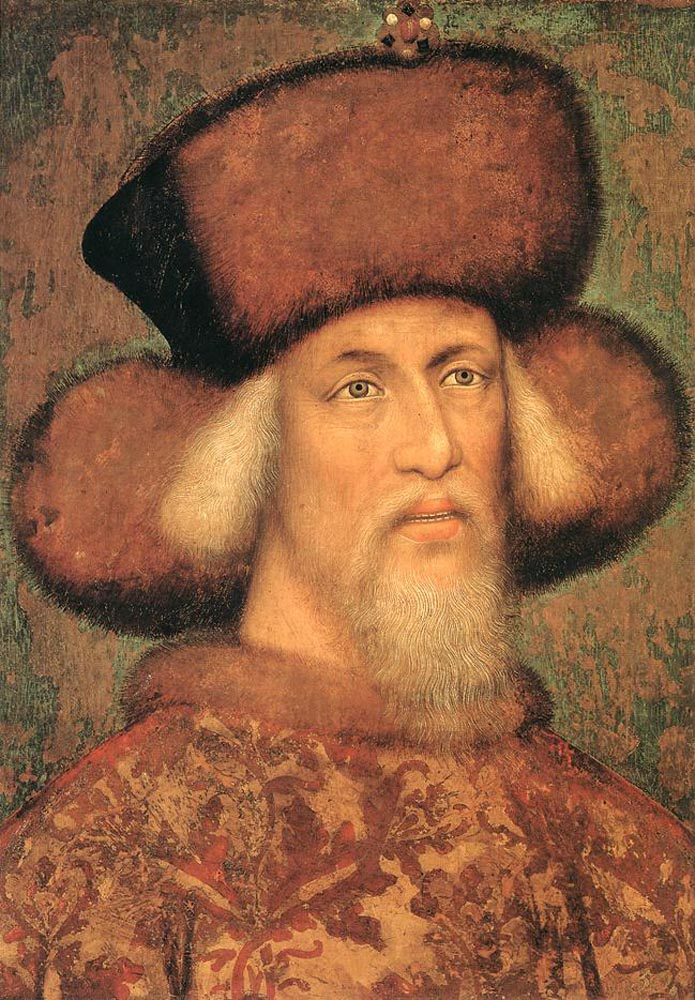
Sigismund of Luxembourg, Holy Roman Emperor

At the beginning of the 15th century, the Dubrovnik government tried to acquire the fertile župa of Konavle. The first round of negotiations with Radosav Pavlović in 1421 were interrupted by two Bosnian dukes quarreling over this sale. The conflict between Radosav and Sandalj Hranić ended in 1423 with the reconciliation and surrender of Soko to Dubrovnik. The people of Dubrovnik and Radosav then renewed peace and negotiations on the selling of his half of Konavle, but again without results. It was not until 1426 that Radosav agreed to sell Konavle to the people of Dubrovnik because he found himself in financial difficulties. He managed to get a far better price than Sandalj got for his half - 13,000 ducats and 600 perpers of annual income. His half was even more valuable because of Cavtat, but Sandalj still protested and fought for another 2,000 ducats to be paid later. Difficulties in relations with Radosav began in the fall of 1429. The duke, without any documents, claimed that several citizens of Dubrovnik owed him money and asked the Dubrovnik government to provide payment. In October 1429, he seized a Dubrovnik caravan with fabrics in response to the silence of the Dubrovnik government. He angrily replied to all complaints, which meant the end of the relationship. Dubrovnik banned trade on Pavlović's land and tried to calm him down. The reason for the new protests was the decision of Dubrovnik to remove a thin isthmus that connected Cavtat with the mainland. That would make the city a small island that can be defended more effectively. In the spring of 1430, word spread that Radosav would attack Dubrovnik. Hostilities began in April of that year. The first Konavle war started, and will last for two years, between 1430 and 1432.

The Bosnian king condemned the duke's actions but could not do anything because Radosav enjoyed the full support of the sultan. The Dubrovnik refused to show up at the Porte on their own, fearing that they would be forced to accept obligation of regular tribute payment. They preferred being represented by someone else. Now they were trying to make an alliance with Tvrtko II and Sandalj against Radosav, and to agree with the sultan on the purchase of Radosav's territories for 70,000 ducats. However, these plans and subsequent negotiations failed.

In the First Konavle War, Dubrovnik showed more strength and initiative than in any of their other wars recorded by historical documents. The mercenary army attacked Trebinje and retaliated evenly for Radosav's attacks on the territory of Dubrovnik - they demolished houses, set fire to the harvest, cut down trees and the like. The Sultan's soubashi arrived first at Radosav's court, and then to Dubrovnik, with the intention of investigating the matter. Radosav claimed that he gave the land to the Republic on lease, and he supported those claims with falsified documents. However, Dubrovnik easily oni su lako opovrgli originalnost ovig dokumenata prove their rights with the original charters. The Sultan ordered that Konavle return to Dubrovnik, and the Republic also raised the issue of war damage, demanding a sum of 60,000 ducats. In the name of war damage, they received Trebinje, Vrm and the Klobuk fortress. Radoslav opposed this decision and attracted the king to his side. With the help of money, they managed to change the decisions at the Porte. The pre-war situation has been restored. Dubrovnik Republic got Konavle, but without war compensation.

== Conflicts over the Bosnian throne ==
Map of medieval Bosnia expansion.

The conflict between the Bosnian king Tvrtko II and the Serbian despot Đurađ Branković broke out in 1432 as a continuation of the war between Tvrtko and Vukašin of the Zlatonosović family. The Serbian despot won the war and occupied Zvornik and Teočak, while the Bosnians defended Srebrenica successfully. In this case Sandalj Hranić sided with the despot, while Radoslav at first sided with Tvrtko, but later he switched to the winning side. The young king encountered another problem in Bosnia internal political struggle in his first years at the Bosnian throne. A pretender to the throne appeared, put forth by Radoslav. It seems that this is the same person that the Burgundian spy and traveling writer, Bertrandon de la Broquière, met at the Porte and whom he mentions in his travelogue. This person was anti-king Radivoj Ostojić, the son of the former king Ostoja. He came to Bosnia in 1433, supported by Sandalj Hranić, Radoslav Pavlović, Serbian despot, but most of all the Ottomans. Tvrtko II had to withdraw to Hungary, where he remained for a full two years. The king returned to the country and restored his rule in 1434. He had been supported by Hrvoje Vukčić's nephew, Đurađ Vojsalić, whose troops were deployed against Sandalj Hranić, and by Hungarian King Sigismund whose army led the fight against the Ottomans and their vassal, Serbian despot Đurađ.

The turning point in these events unfolding in Bosnia was caused by the death of Sandalj Hranić on 15 March 1435. The Hungarian king tried to strengthen the power over Tvrtko II and annex Hum to Hungary, which the Hungarian kings had been claiming since the reign of King Lajos (1342–1382), but these attempts failed. Hum was very significant for Bosnian Kingdom, especially because of trg Drijeva. On Sigmund's orders, Croatian ban, Matija Matko Talovac, attacked the land of Hum in the area of the Neretva river. The local nobel families, Vojsalićs and Radivojević also joined him, but they were actually sent there by Bosnian king all the while they had goal of their own, which was to break from new lord of Hum, Sandalj's successor, Grand Duke of Bosnia, Stjepan Vukčić. Since Sandalj's brothers, Vuk and Vukac Hranići, died during his lifetime, and the duke himself didn't produce an heir, the duke was succeeded by his eldest nephew Stjepan, who was appointed to be successor already in 1419. Stjepan Vukčić in his first years faced enormous pressure, and was attacked from all sides. First he lost Drijeva trg, where Đurađ Vojsalić fortified himself. In the middle of 1435, struggling to hold onto his possessions Stjepan was compelled to ask the Ottomans for help. A large detachment of 1,500 Ottoman cavalry arrived in Bosnia in early July. With the Ottoman help Stjepan took initiative and expelled Hungarians from Hum, and the territories of Radoslav Pavlović were looted. Also, Stjepan Vukčić provided support to the successor of Ivaniš Nelipić, his son-in-law Ivan Frankopan.

After Ivaniš's death, Sigmund claimed Omiš for himself and sent Ban Matija Talovac against Frankopans. In 1436, Stjepan personally came to the aid of his ally. Before the end of 1436, Stjepan removed the Hungarian pressure on Hum for good, by settling relations with the Hungarian king. At the same time, he reconciled with Tvrtko II. The people of Dubrovnik also accepted him as Sandalj's successor, as well as the Venetian Republic. Stjepan's most persistent opponent was no other than Radoslav Pavlović. At the end of 1437, Radosav lost the favor of the sultan, and Stjepan received a blessing from Murat II to capture Trebinje. Stjepan also occupied Jeleč fort in Podrinje. In Vrm, he besieged the Klobuk fortress. However, Radosav regained Porte's favor in a short time and used its influence against Stjepan. In 1439, the Ottomans invaded Bosnia and forced Stjepan to reconcile with Radosav and return Trebinje and all other territories he had taken from him. Reconciliation between, at the time, two most powerful Bosnian noble families, Pavlović-Radinović and Vukčić-Kosača, was finally sealed by remarriage between Radosav and Stjepan's sister Teodora.

== Remaining days and death ==
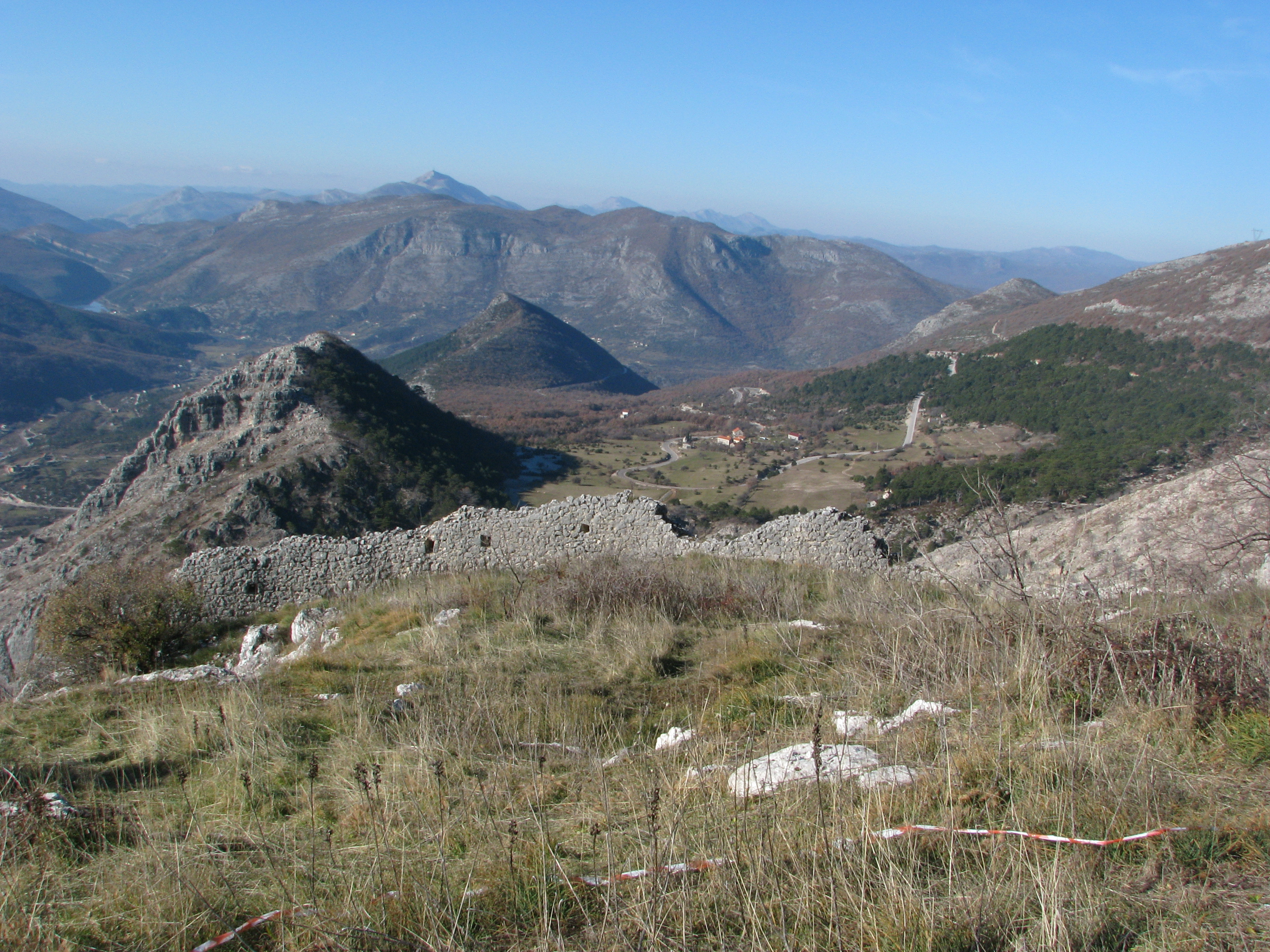
Klobul fortress, the last stronghold of Pavlovićs on the south, taken over by Stjepan Vukčić

At the beginning of 1440, Radoslav Pavlović owed the sultan a large sum of money, for which he gave Trebinje and Vrm to Stjepan Vukčić on the condition that Stjepan pays Radoslav's debt to sultan. In March 1440, Stjepan captured Trebinje. War broke out, and Radoslav and Stjepan sued at Porte. Radoslav Pavlović died at the end of March 1441. He was succeeded by his eldest son Ivaniš Pavlović, however being too young to rule, his mother, Radoslav's widow and sister of Stjepan Vukčić, ruled as regent for time being. Immediately after Radoslav's death, the Pavlović's lost their last property in the south - Klobuk fortress.

== Personal life and issue ==
Radoslav Pavlović was the second son of knez Pavle Radinović, who had another, older son and Radosav's brother, Petar I (1415–1420), knez, later vojvoda.

He was married to Teodora Vukčić, the daughter of Vukac Hranić from the Kosača family (niece of Sandalj Hranić and sister of Stjepan Vukčić Kosača) with whom he had three sons:

- Ivaniš Pavlović (1441–1450), vojvoda
- Petar II Pavlović (1450–1463), vojvoda
- Nikola Pavlović (1450 — 1463), knez

Jablan
Radin Jablanić
Pavle Radinović
Radoslav Pavlović

== Bibliography ==
- Ćirković, Sima (1964a). Herceg Stefan Vukčić-Kosača i njegovo doba [Herceg Stefan Vukčić-Kosača and his time] (in Serbian). Naučno delo SANU.
- Ćirković, Sima (1964). Историја средњовековне босанске државе [History of the medieval Bosnian state] (in Serbian). Srpska književna zadruga.
- Ćorović, Vladimir (1940). Хисторија Босне [History of Bosnia] (in Serbian) (Посебна изданја - Друштбени и историски списи - Књига 53 ed.). Belgrade: Српска краљевска академија - Штамиарија "Слово" (Глас српски - reprint 1999). ISBN 978-86-7119-161-6.
- Ćorović, Vladimir (1997). Istorija srpskog naroda [History of the Serb people] (in Serbian) (Book 1 ed.). Belgrade: eBook Portal.
- Kurtović, Esad (2009b), Hranić (in Serbo-Croatian), Miroslav Krleža Institute of Lexicography
- Ćošković, Pejo (2009a), Kosača (in Serbo-Croatian), Miroslav Krleža Institute of Lexicography
- Ćošković, Pejo (2009), Kotromanići (in Serbo-Croatian), Miroslav Krleža Institute of Lexicography
- Fine, John Van Antwerp Jr. (1990) [1987]. The Late Medieval Balkans: A Critical Survey from the Late Twelfth Century to the Ottoman Conquest. ISBN 0-472-10079-3.
- Fine, John Van Antwerp Jr. (1994) [1987]. The Late Medieval Balkans: A Critical Survey from the Late Twelfth Century to the Ottoman Conquest. Ann Arbor, Michigan: University of Michigan Press. ISBN 978-0-472-08260-5.
- Fine, John Van Antwerp Jr. (2007). The Bosnian Church: Its Place in State and Society from the Thirteenth to the Fifteenth Century. Saqi. ISBN 978-0-86356-503-8.
- Kurtović, Esad (2010). "Sandalj Hranić Kosača – Biography of the Bosnian Magnate". Bosna Franciscana (in Bosnian) (33). CEEOL. ISSN 1330-7487.
- Kurtović, Esad (2009). Sandalj Hranić Kosača – Biografija bosanskog vlastelina [Sandalj Hranić Kosača – Biography of a Bosnian nobleman]. Historijske monografije (in Bosnian). Vol. 4. Sarajevo: Institut za istoriju. ISBN 978-9958-649-01-1 – via academia.edu.
- Šabanović, Hazim (1959). Bosanski pašaluk: Postanak i upravna podjela [Bosnian pashaluk: Origin and administrative division]. Sarajevo: Naučno društvo Bosne i Hercegovine.
- Vego, Marko (1957). Naselja bosanske srednjevjekovne države [Settlements of the Bosnian medieval state] (in Serbo-Croatian). Sarajevo: Svjetlost.
- Vego, Marko (1982). Postanak srednjovjekovne bosanske države [The becoming of the medieval Bosnian state] (in Serbo-Croatian). Sarajevo: Svjetlost.

Preceded by —	Pavlović; 1420 — 1441.	Succeeded by —
