= Nikola Pavlović-Radinović =

15th century Bosnian nobleman

Gospodin Nikola Pavlović
- knez
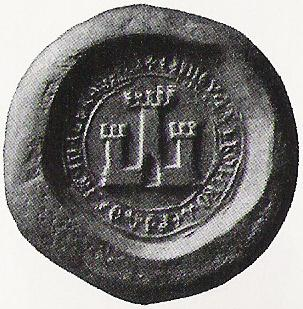

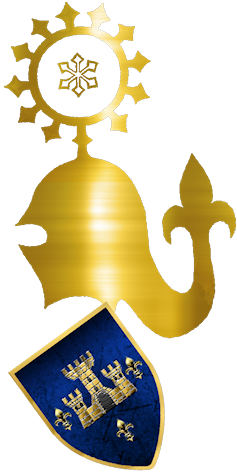
- Coat of arms
- Predecessor: Ivanić Pavlović
- Successor: non
- Full name: Nikola Pavlović Radinović
- Native name: Nikola Pavlović
- Died: 1463; Prača
- Residence: Pavlovac
- Locality: Prača
- Wars and battles: First Konavle War
- Family: Pavlović-Radinović
- Father: Radoslav Pavlović Radinović
- Mother: Teodora Pavlović-Kosača

Nikola Pavlović (Serbian Cyrillic: Никола Павловић; died 1463) was a knez from the Pavlović noble family, which had its estates in the eastern parts of the Kingdom of Bosnia. He was the youngest of three Radoslav Pavlović's sons.

He had two older brothers, Ivaniš and Petar II, and perhaps one sister. After the death of Duke Ivaniš in November 1450, he and his older brother, Petar II, at that point Grand Duke of Bosnia, inherited House of Pavlović estates and titles. In their political activities, they were limited by the influence of their powerful uncle, Grand Duke of Bosnia, Stjepan Vukčić Kosača. They probably died together during the Ottoman conquest of Bosnia in 1463.

== See also ==
- Pavlovac

== Bibliography ==
- Nilević, Boris (1978). Војвода Иваниш Павловић. Сарајево: Прилози Института за историју 14-15.
- Ćirković, Sima (1964). Историја средњовековне босанске државе. Београд: Српска књижевна задруга.
- Šabanović, Hazim (1959). Bosanski pašaluk: Postanak i upravna podjela. Sarajevo: Naučno društvo Bosne i Hercegovine.
