= Pavlović noble family =

Medieval Bosnian ducal family

Radinović-Pavlović Radinović, Pavlović
- Noble house
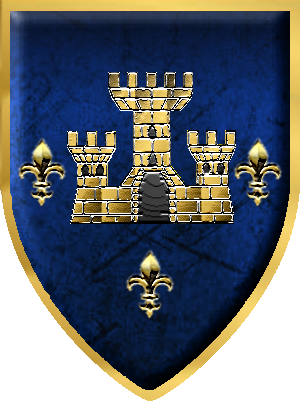
- Coat of arms of the House of Pavlović
- Parent house: Radinović
- Country: Banate of Bosnia & Kingdom of Bosnia
- Founded: 1391
- Founder: Pavle Radinović
- Final ruler: Nikola Pavlović
- Titles: Veliki Vojvoda Bosanski; English: Grand Duke of Bosnia; Vojvoda; English: Duke; Knez; English: Lord; Vlasteličić; English: minor Lord
- Styles: Veliki Vojvoda Bosanski; English: Grand Duke of Bosnia
- Estates: Borač-Pavlovac (main family estate)
- Dissolution: 1463; Ottoman conquest

The House of Pavlović, also Radinović or Radenović, or Radinović-Pavlović, was Bosnian noble family who got their name after Radin Jablanić. Radin's father, Jablan, was a founder of Jablanić house, an earlier branch of this medieval Bosnian clan. Jablan's estate was in Jablan village (also Jablanovo, near Lukavica). Later, family extended their feudal possessions from the Middle and Upper Drina river in the eastern parts of medieval Bosnia, known as Pavlovića zemlja, to south-southeastern regions of the Bosnian realm in Hum and Konavle at the Adriatic coast. The family official residence and seat was at Borač and later Pavlovac, above the Prača river canyon, between present-day Prača, Rogatica and Goražde in Bosnia and Herzegovina.

== History ==
Much contention has arisen from attempt to ubicate Pavlović's exact place of origins. At first Đuro Mazalić, Bosnian medievalist, thought that Old Borač was that place, but later changed his mind, and with a new insight in Gazi Husrcfheg's vakufama, issued in 1531, it was found that the village of Jablan (or Jablanovo), in the Lukavica neighborhood of Sarajevo, existed. It was assumed that this Lukavica formed a small župa in the Middle Ages, and in it was the village of Jablanovo. The father of Pavle Radinović was called Radin Jablanić, getting that surname from patronymic Jablan. The estate on which that Jablan lived was named after him Jablanovo. There is also a large medieval necropolis of stećak's by name of Pavlovac nearby the estate and is recognized as a family's "noble heritage". it is associated with Pavle Radinović, and "it was undoubtedly Pavlović's property". From here it was possible that one branch of the family later founded Borač in Prača as the family's seat.

Radin Jablanić was a local lord of the Krivaja valley and Prača region, and father of family's founder Pavle Radinović, who ruled a territory in the east and south to southeastern parts of the Bosnian Kingdom, from the late 14th century until his death in 1415.

Pavle Radinović plotted against then king of Bosnia, Ostoja, and his Grand Duke, Sandalj Hranić, which led to his assassination by Sandalj in Kraljeva Sutjeska in 1415. He was buried somewhere in Vrhbosna, it is speculated in today's Sarajevo outskirts, between suburb of Dobrinja and village of Tilava, in the areal named "Pavlovac".

Most prominent member of the family was Grand Duke of Bosnia, Radislav Pavlović, son of Pavle.

== Family seat ==
=== Borač castle ===
The family hailed and ruled from Borač-Pavlovac. It's actually two castles rather than one, built in space of several decades (two generations) and few kilometers apart in distance from each others. These are simply known as Old Borač and New Borač or Pavlovac.

=== Pavlovac castle ===
The new castle of Borač is actually called Pavlovac, and is considered to be a new structure also known Novi (English: New), or Novi Grad (English: New Town). Problem exist in correct dating of its construction, but some medieval charters suggest 1392, or late 14th century, as time of its construction, during Radislav Pavlović at the family's helm.

=== Old Borač castle ===
However, historians are certain that another Radinović-Pavlović fortress existed, original and older Borač castle, which was built around 1244 in the 13th century and located just a few kilometers downstream the Prača river, near village Mesići, between villages of Borač i Brčigovo.

== Possessions ==
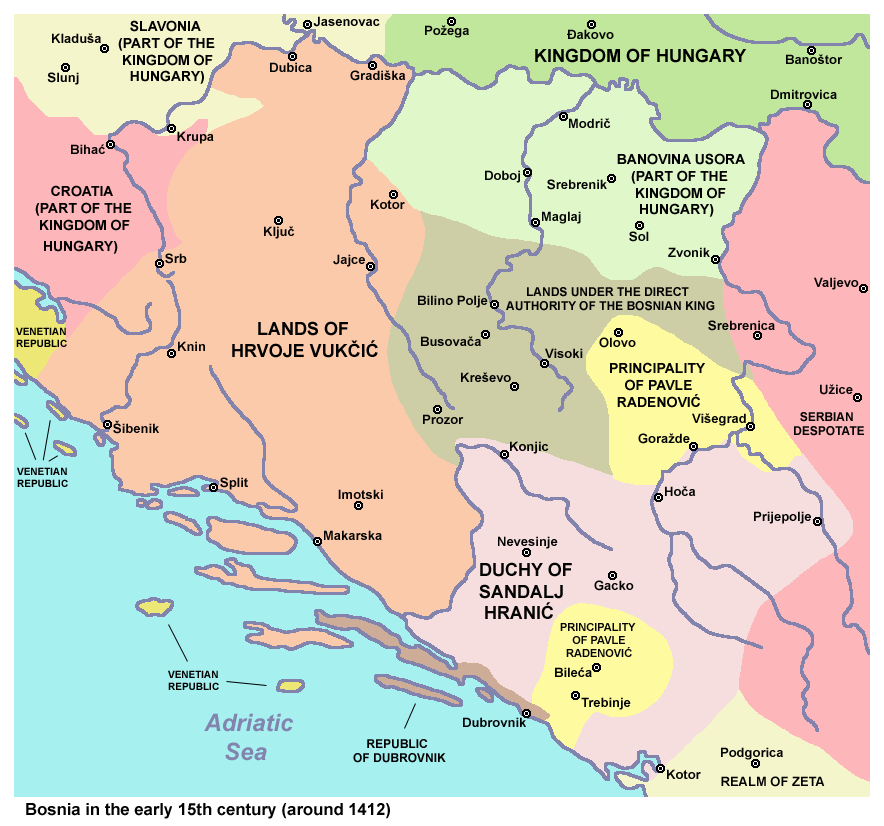
Principality of Pavle Radinović, later known as Pavlovića Zemlja (transl. Pavlovićs' Land) in the early 15th century (approx.)

Possessions, estates and castles of Radinović-Pavlović family:

Borač	Popovo Polje, parts of	Konavle, parts of
Goražde	Bileća	Cavtat
Krivaja Valley, parts of	Vrhbosna, parts of	Žepa
Nišići	Trebinje	Ustikolina
Olovo	Srednje	Sokolac
Prača	Romanija	Višegrad
Rogatica

== Family tree ==
The most prominent members were:

- Radin Jablanić (-1391), minor Landlord (Vlasteličić)
  - Pavle Radinović (Founder) (1391–1415), Lord (Knez) and Duke (Vojvoda)
    - Petar I Pavlović (1415–1420), Duke (Vojvoda)
    - Radislav Pavlović (1420–1441), Grand Duke of Bosnia (since 1441), Lord (Knez) and Duke (Vojvoda)
      - Ivaniš Pavlović (1441–1450), Duke (Vojvoda)
      - Petar II Pavlović (1450–1463), Lord (Knez), Duke (Vojvoda)
      - Nikola Pavlović (1450–1463), Lord (Knez)

== Religion ==
Basic expression of loyalty and affiliation for all Bosnian nobility during 14th and early 15th century, when Pavlović family ruled the central and eastern parts of Banat of Bosnia and then Kingdom of Bosnia, was their loyalty to the monarch, the kingdom, and the Bosnian Church. Hence, all the members of Pavlović family, throughout 14th and early 15th century, were adherents of this religion, except duke Ivaniš Pavlović, who ventured into Catholicism.
So, it is known for certain that knyaz Pavle Radinović, his sons, duke Petar and knyaz and later grand duke Radislav Pavlović, as well as grand duke's Radislav sons, duke Ivaniš, prince Nikola and knyaz Petar Pavlović, were all adherents of the Bosnian Church.
Members and leaders of the Bosnian Church had had important role and influence at Pavlović's family courts through generations, first with knyaz Pavla's Radinović at his court, and later at the court of Grand Duke of Bosnia Radislav Pavlović, as well as with his brother, duke Petar, at his court. This continued with Radislav's sons as well, duke Ivaniš Pavlović, prince Nikola and knyaz Petar. Actually, it was Grand Duke of Bosnia, Radislav Pavlović, who significantly increased a role and influence of the Bosnian Church's krstjani clergy, their members and leaders, with a state affairs. Historical documents noted frequent appearance of the Bosnian Church influential clergymen every time political and/or economic relations needed mediation, whether within Bosnia and its magnates, or between Bosnia and its neighbors, and most notably in relation with Dubrovnik. These mediation were numerous, especially between Bosnian elite and Dubrovnik, such as negotiations over sale of Radislav Pavlović's part of Konavale to Dubrovnik and mediation in ending Konavle war.

== Coat of arms ==
The Radinović-Pavlović coat of arms, among others, was discussed in the book "Rodoslovne tablice i grbovi srpskih dinastija i vlastele", by group of Serbian authors, Aleksa Ivić, Dušan Mrđenović, Dušan Spasić, and Aleksandar Palavestra, from 1987. The subject of, and, at the same time, a main reference for this book are Illyrian Armorials, such as Fojnica and Ohmućević. Notably, all these armorials are in significant part fictional depiction of the medieval families coat of arms.
However, according to these authors, the "Illyrian Armorials" depict actual family coat of arms as a fortified city with three towers, on both the shield and the crest, with red shield and golden city on it, while the city in the crest is red, as well as the mantling with an interior of golden. The "Ohmućević Armorial" added three golden lilies in the shield, however, that interpretation is not in line with sphragistics, and is likely to be decorative.
The Pavlović family left six seals, which all have the same heraldic symbol, a tower, or fortified city. The oldest coat of arms is that of Pavle, dated to 1397, which has a fortified city with one tower. On the seals of his son, Radoslav, one has one tower (1432), the other three (1437), while Radoslav's son Ivaniš has three towers in his seal. The fortification is most likely modeled after Ragusan (today Dubrovnik) seals. This seal was likely used as the family coat of arms, despite the fact that there are no authentic complete coat of arms with shield, helmet and crest.

On the same subject other authors, like Ćiro Truhelka from 1914, and more recently Nada Grujić and Danko Zelić from 2010, and Amer Sulejmanagić from 2012, have different perspectives, from which they made different conclusions. Primarily, for them existence of the coat of arms (escutcheon, helmet and crest), created by artisan Ratko Ivančić in 1427 and still visible at the family palace in Dubrovnik, is not in dispute.
Thus, according to Croatian archaeologist Ćiro Truhelka and his study "Osvrt na sredovječne kulturne spomenike Bosne" from 1914, the Illyrian Armorials, according to its "ideological-propagandic message", used the red color in the coat of arms, instead of Radoslav Pavlović's coat of arms in Ragusa which used ultramarine.

On the same line, Nada Grujić and Danko Zelić, in their study from 2010, state that Radislav Pavlović's coat of arms was in gold and lapis lazuli.
Radoslav Pavlović's coat of arms at his palace in Ragusa was made by Ratko Ivančić in 1427, measuring 1.28 × 1.28 m.

In two stećci in Boljuni near Stolac, there are engravings of a castle with three towers, which Šefik Bešlagić used to believe belonged to members of the family. On the other hand, there is an assumption that the necropolis at Pavlovac village, in Kasindo near Sarajevo, belonged to the family, thus, the resting place of the family remains unsolved.

Family coat of arms evolution

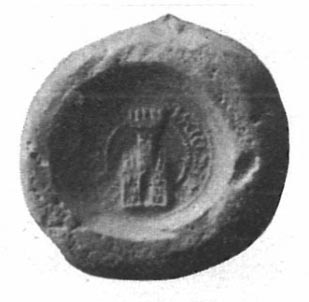
Older seal used by Radislav's father, knez Pavle Radinović, with depiction of his court, Borač Castle.

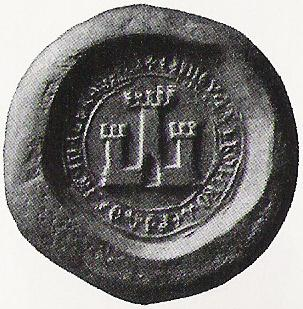
Seal of Grand Duke of Bosnia, Radislav Pavlović, son of knez Pavle, with depiction of his court, Pavlovac Fortress.

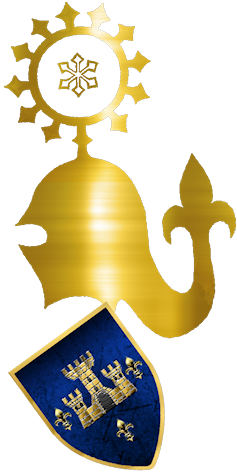
Coat of arms in blue & gold at family palace in Dubrovnik, authored by Ratko Ivančić in 1427.

== Annotations ==
1. Name: His surname is sometimes spelled Radenović (Serbian Cyrillic: Раденовић) and sometimes Radinović, being a patronymic from his father's name Raden or Radin (Jablanić). Same goes for his son Radoslav or Radislav (Pavlović). Different authors use different spelling, in most of the cases authors from Bosnia and Herzegovina and Croatia use Radin-Radinović-Radislav variant of these names, like, for example, one of the most important Bosnian medievalists Marko Vego 1957, same in Esad Kurtović 2009's book on pg.23 under reference 60. cited medieval charter with surname spelled Radinović ("Primjera radi, knez Pavle Radinović naveden je ispravno: “knezj Pavalj Radinović jzj bratiomj”; “Comes Paulus Radinović cum fratribus”, Šurmin, Hrvatski spomenici, 97; Klaić, Povelja, 61."); meanwhile authors from Serbia, like Jovan Radonić, use Raden-Radenović-Radoslav, sometimes even Radosav, variant. Authors from outside Serbo-Croatian speaking sphere use any of these variants indiscriminately, hence Fine 1994 uses Paul (Pavle) Radenović, while, for example, Heinrich Renner 1897, in his "Durch Bosnien und die Herzegovina kreuz und quer" on pg.129, writes Paul Radinović.

== Bibliography ==
- Sulejmanagić, Amer (2012). "The Coat of Arms of the Pavlović Family". Bosna Franciscana. 36/2012. Aleja Bosne Srebrene 111, Sarajevo, Bosnia and Herzegovina: Franjevačka teologija Sarajevo: 165–206.
- Fine, John Van Antwerp (1994), The Late Medieval Balkans: A Critical Survey from the Late Twelfth Century to the Ottoman Conquest, Ann Arbor: University of Michigan Press, ISBN 978-0-472-08260-5
- Renner, Heinrich (1897), Durch Bosnien und die Herzegovina kreuz und quer (in German), Berlin D. Reimer (E. Vohsen)
- Vego, Marko (1957), Naselja bosanske srednjevjekovne države (in Serbo-Croatian), Sarajevo: Svjetlost
- Kurtović, Esad (2009), Veliki vojvoda bosanski Sandalj Hranić Kosača (PDF) (in Bosnian), Sarajevo: Institut za istoriju univerzitet Sarajevo, archived from the original (PDF) on 2018-07-14
- Aleksa Ivić; Dušan Mrđenović; Dušan Spasić; Aleksandar Palavestra (1987). Rodoslovne tablice i grbovi srpskih dinastija i vlastele. Belgrade: Nova knjiga. ISBN 9788673350509.
- Dragić, Dragan (July 1991). RADOSAV PAVLOVIĆ I NJEGOVO DOBA (pdf) (in Serbian). Tuzla: Muzej Istočne Bosne Tuzla.
- Mazalić, Đuro (1941). "Borač, bosanski dvor Srednjeg vijeka". Glasnik hrvatskih zemaljskih muzeja u Bosni i Hercegovini (in Serbo-Croatian). LIII. Sarajevo i: Zemaljski muzej Bosne i Hercegovine (available for download in .pdf both at faculty website and dokumen.tips online repository).
- Mazalić, Đuro (1950). "Kraj iz koga su Pavlovići porijeklom". Glasnik Zemaljskog muzeja u Bosni i Hercegovini (in Serbo-Croatian). 4/5. Sarajevo: Zemaljski muzej Bosne i Hercegovine: 219–223.
- Amer Maslo (2018). Slavni i velmožni gospodin knez Pavle Radinović. Sarajevo: University of Sarajevo; M.A. Thesis; mentor: Doc.Dr. Emir O. Filipović (available for download in .pdf both at faculty website and Academia repository).
