= Petar II Pavlović =

15th century Bosnian nobleman

Gospodin Petar II Pavlović
- Grand Duke of Bosnia
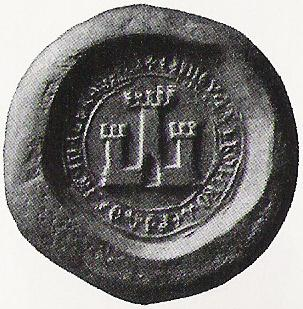

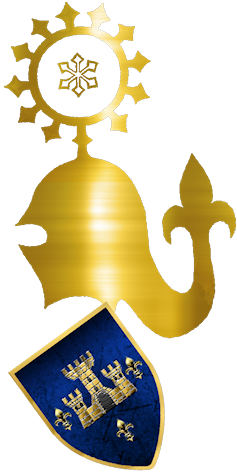
- Coat of arms
- Predecessor: Ivaniš Pavlović
- Successor: non
- Full name: Petar II Pavlović Radinović
- Native name: Petar
- Born: April 1425
- Died: 1463; Prača
- Residence: Pavlovac
- Locality: Prača
- Wars and battles: First Konavle War
- Family: Pavlović-Radinović
- Father: Radoslav Pavlović Radinović
- Mother: Teodora Kosača

Petar II Pavlović (Serbian Cyrillic: Петар II Павловић; April 1425 — 1463) was a knez and later a duke from the noble family of Pavlović, who had their estates in the eastern parts of the Kingdom of Bosnia. He was second oldest son of Radoslav Pavlović.

He had two brothers, the older Ivaniš and the younger Nikola, and perhaps one sister. After the death of his older brother, Grand Duke of Bosnia, Ivaniš in November 1450, he and his younger brother, knez Nikola, shared the leadership of the House of Pavlović. In his political activities, he was limited by the influence of his uncle Stjepan Vukčić Kosača. He died during the Ottoman conquest of Bosnia in 1463.

== See also ==
- Pavlovac

== Bibliography ==
- Nilević, Boris (1978). Војвода Иваниш Павловић. Сарајево: Прилози Института за историју 14-15.
- Ćirković, Sima (1964). Историја средњовековне босанске државе. Београд: Српска књижевна задруга.
- Šabanović, Hazim (1959). Bosanski pašaluk: Postanak i upravna podjela. Sarajevo: Naučno društvo Bosne i Hercegovine.
