= Ivaniš Pavlović =

15th century Bosnian nobleman

Gospodin Ivaniš Pavlović
- Grand Duke of Bosnia
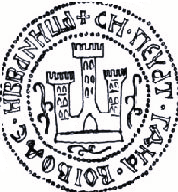

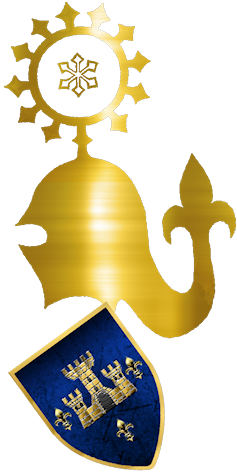
- Coat of arms
- Predecessor: Petar I Pavlović; Radoslav Pavlović
- Successor: Petar II Pavlović
- Full name: Ivaniš Pavlović Radinović
- Native name: Ivaniš Pavlović
- Born: June 1423
- Died: November 1450 (aged 27)
- Residence: Pavlovac
- Locality: Prača
- Wars and battles: First Konavle War
- Family: Pavlović-Radinović
- Father: Radoslav Pavlović Radinović
- Mother: Teodora Kosača

Ivaniš Pavlović (Serbian Cyrillic: Иваниш Павловић; June 1423 – November 1450) was a knez (aristocrat) and later a Grand Duke of Bosnia from the noble family of Pavlović, who had their estates in the eastern parts of the Kingdom of Bosnia. He was the oldest son of Radoslav Pavlović, and had two brothers Petar II and Nikola.

He was born in June 1423. During the conflict in Konavle (1430–1432) between Pavlović and the Ragusa, his father sent him together with his mother Teodora to the Bosnian court. With the conclusion of peace between Dubrovnik and Radoslav Pavlović, the question of the oath of the young knez Ivaniš was on the agenda. After the conclusion of peace by Duke Radoslav, Knez Ivaniš was obliged to swear an oath to that peace when he was 14 years old.

After the death of duke Radoslav in November 1441 Ivaniš became the head of the house of Pavlović. He confirmed the peace with Ragusa and all the agreements of his predecessors, and in December 1442, the people of Ragusa confirmed all rights and privileges to the Pavlović. The second diplomatic step was the reconciliation with his uncle Stjepan Vukčić Kosača, with whom the Pavlovićs were in a prolonged conflict, and who seized their territories on the coast, around the Trebinje, including Klobuk Fortress.

Ivaniš left the Bosnian Church, for Catholicism in 1446 and return to the Bosnian Church in 1449.

He died in 1450, and was succeeded by his brothers Petar II and Nikola.

== See also ==
- Pavlovac
