= Radin Jablanić =

14th century Bosnian nobleman

Gospodin Radin Jablanić
- Knez (English: Lord) of the Banate of Bosnia
- Predecessor: Jablan
- Successor: Pavle Radinović
- Born: 1330
- Died: 1387 (aged 56–57)
- Noble family: Pavlović-Radinović
- Father: Jablan
- Occupation: Nobleman

Radin Jablanić (Serbian Cyrillic: Радин Јабланић; 1330–1387) was a powerful Bosnian nobleman, the oldest known member of the Pavlović noble family and the father of Pavle Radinović, who rose to prominence during the reign of Tvrtko I. His power and wealth made him one of the most powerful magnates and his family one of the most influential in Bosnian Banate and later the Kingdom of Bosnia, ruling the area around between Drina and Vrhbosna, and between Krivaja and Prača.

Even as a boy, Radin traveled with his father around the family estates, followed the completion of the construction of the town of Borač, and worked with his father on plans for the construction of other towers and city walls under the family's administration. Radin's father's name was Jablan, from whom he got the surname Jablanić.

As early as 1355, he took over the management of the family estates, when Bosnia was ruled by Ban Stjepan Tvrtko I Kotromanić. In thirty years at the head of the family, he succeeded to increase the family estates many times over. Thus, in 1373, he expanded his possessions to the entire left bank of the Drina river up to Srebrenica, in the north to Birač and northwest to town of Olovo, in the south to Foča, thus holding the greater part of the eastern borderlands of Banate of Bosnia. In 1377, he helped ban Tvrtko I to take over Trebinje and the Dubrovnik hinterland of Konavle, for which he was awarded Trebinje and the wider area by the ban.

Preceded by Jablan	Pavlović-Radinović ? – 1387; Radin	Succeeded by Pavle

== Bibliography ==
- Maslo, Amer (2018). Slavni i velmožni gospodin knez Pavle Radinović [The illustrious and noble Prince Pavle Radinović] (PDF) (in Bosnian). Sarajevo: Univ. u Sarajevu, Filozofski fakultet, Odsjek za historiju.
- Ćorović, Vladimir (2001), Istorija srpskog naroda (in Serbian) (Internet ed.), Belgrade: Ars Libri
- Fine, John Van Antwerp (December 1975), The Bosnian Church: a new interpretation: a study of the Bosnian Church and its place in state and society from the 13th to the 15th centuries, East European quarterly, ISBN 978-0-914710-03-5
- Fine, John Van Antwerp (1994), The Late Medieval Balkans: A Critical Survey from the Late Twelfth Century to the Ottoman Conquest, Ann Arbor: University of Michigan Press, ISBN 978-0-472-08260-5
- Renner, Heinrich (1897), Durch Bosnien und die Herzegovina kreuz und quer (in German), Berlin D. Reimer (E. Vohsen)
- Vego, Marko (1957), Naselja bosanske srednjevjekovne države (in Bosnian), Sarajevo: Svjetlost
- Kurtović, Esad (2009), Veliki vojvoda bosanski Sandalj Hranić Kosača (PDF) (in Bosnian), Sarajevo: Institut za istoriju univerzitet Sarajevo, archived from the original (PDF) on 2018-07-14
- Živković, Pavo (1981). Tvrtko II Tvrtković: Bosna u prvoj polovini xv stoljeća (in Serbo-Croatian). Sarajevo: Institut za istoriju. ISBN 0-472-08260-4.
- Jovan Radonić (1901). O knezu Pavlu Radenoviću: priložak istoriji Bosne krajem xiv i xv veka. Štamparija Srpske knjižare braće M. Popovića.
- "Земља Павловића: средњи вијек и период турске владавине". зборник радова са научног скупа Рогатица, 27–29. јуна 2002. Бања Лука; Српско Сарајево: Академија наука и умјетности Републике Српске: 203–210. 2003.
  - "Кнез Павле Раденовић и Котор". Земља Павловића: средњи вијек и период турске владавине: 203–210. 2003.
