= Klobuk (disambiguation) =

Klobuk is an item of traditional clothing worn by Eastern Orthodox and Eastern Catholic monks and bishops.

Klobuk may also refer to:

- Klobuk (Ljubuški), a village in the Ljubuški municipality of Bosnia and Herzegovina
- Klobuk (Trebinje), a village in the Trebinje municipality of Bosnia and Herzegovina
