= Klobuk fortress (Trebinje) =

- Old town Klobuk
- Klobuk, Trebinje; Bosnia and Herzegovina
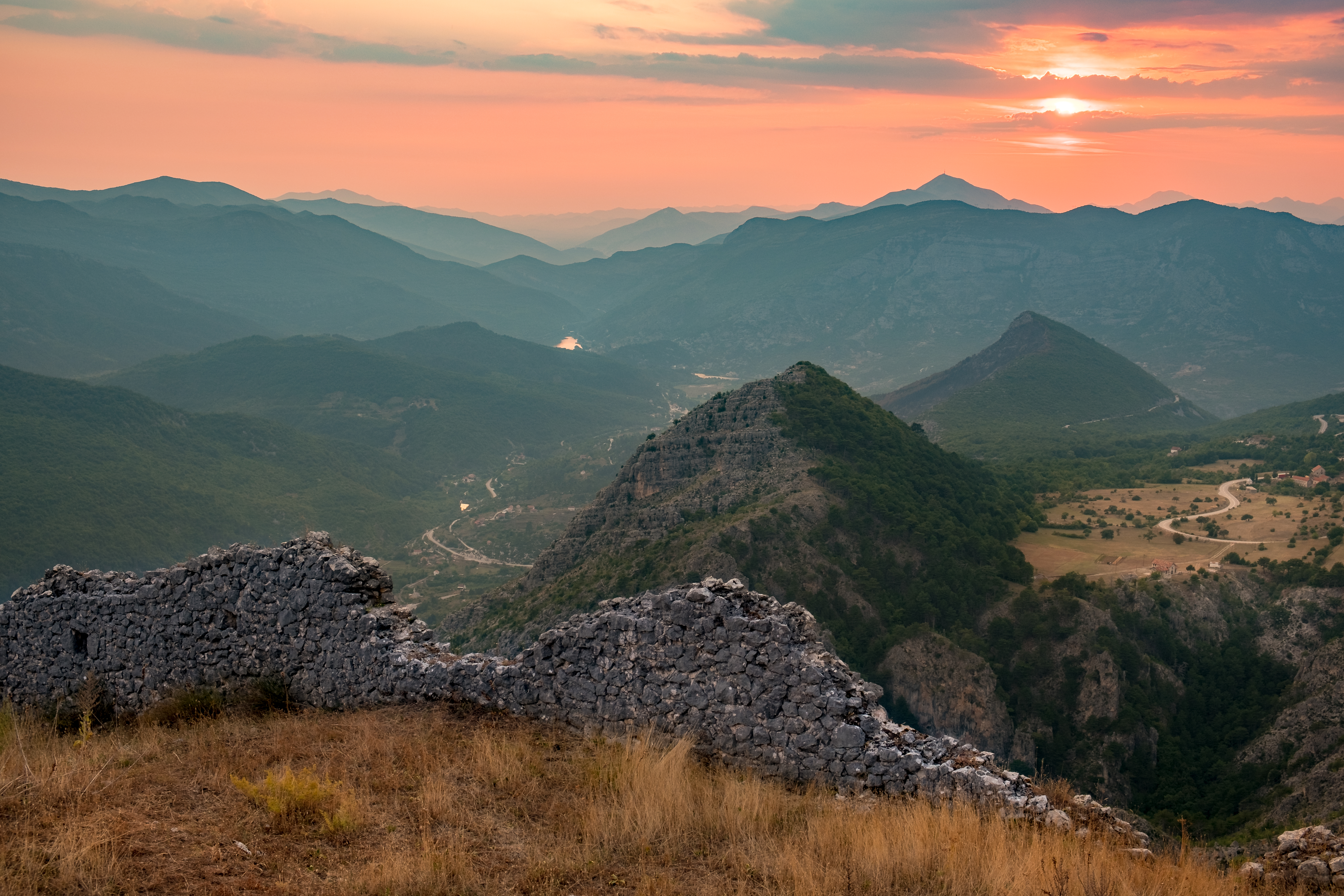
- Klobuk Fortress, southern stronghold of Pavlović family, later captured by Stjepan Vukčić Kosača

Site information
- Type: Castle (residential, fortification)
- Owner: Pavlović noble family
- Controlled by: Banate of Bosnia, 1321 to 1395; Kingdom of Bosnia, 1371 to 1463; Sanković family, 1321 to 1395; Pavlović family, 1395 to 1442; Stjepan Vukčić Kosača, 1442 to 1477; Ottoman Empire, 1477 to 1878
- Open to the public: yes
- Condition: ruined

Location
- Coordinates: 42.70465°N 18.54705°E

Site history
- Built: before 10th c.
- Built by: multilayered (probably of local Illyrian)
- Materials: Limestone (partly ashlar)

Garrison information
- Designations: (Protected as National Monument of Bosnia and Herzegovina)
- Site is protected as National Monument of Bosnia and Herzegovina by The Government of Bosnia and Herzegovina and its KONS BiH

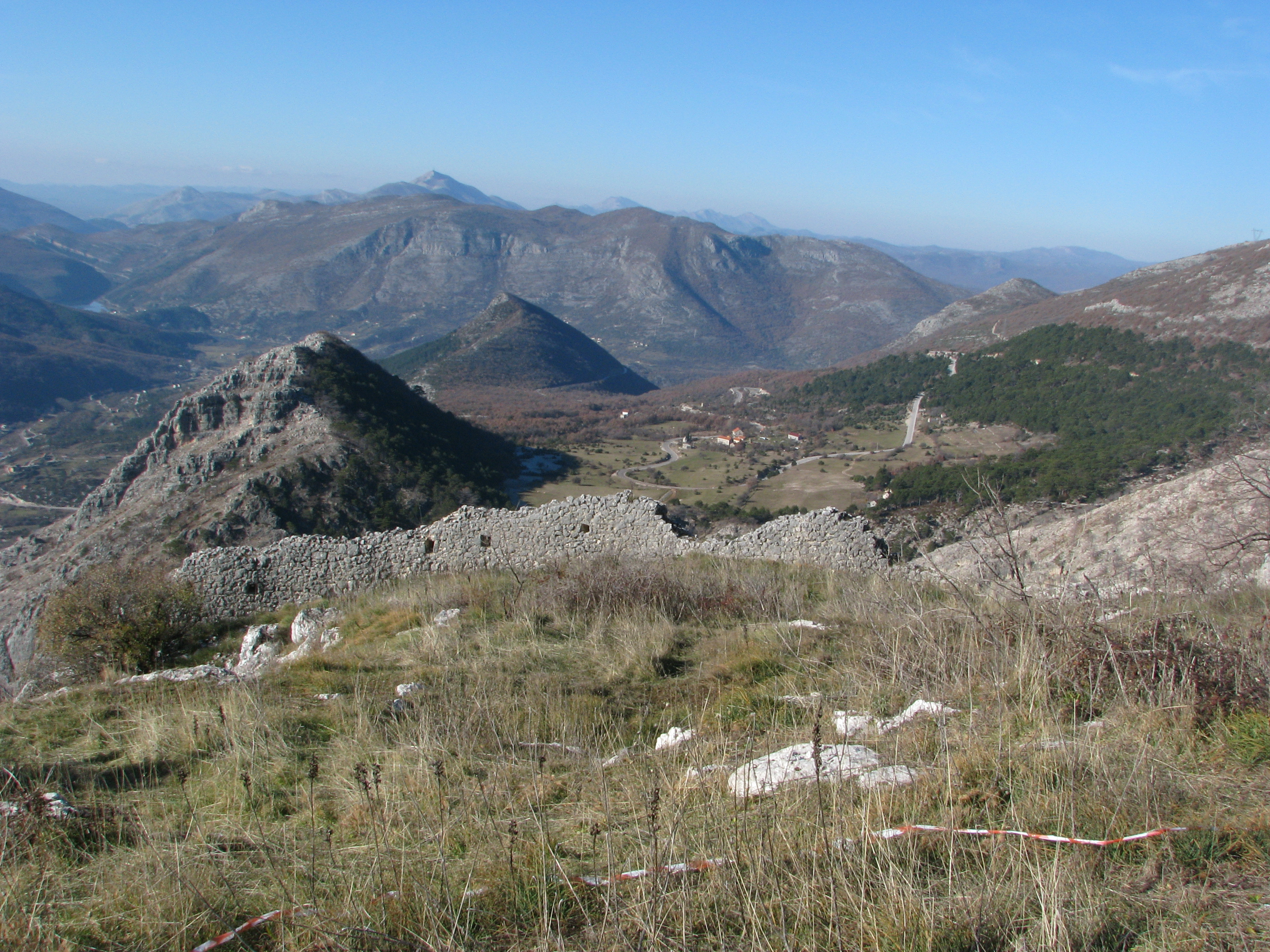
Klobuk Fortress

Klobuk is a medieval fortress in Bosnia and Herzegovina. It is located on the karst plateau of Mirotinske grede, near the village of Klobuk, Trebinje, in the Republic of Srpska entity of Bosnia and Herzegovina. It is declared a National Monument of Bosnia and Herzegovina, by the Commission to Preserve National Monuments of Bosnia and Herzegovina.

== History ==
The old town of Klobuk is located on the sloping plateau of Mirotinske grede, above the village of Aranđelovo and the valley of the river Sušica, below the steep cliffs in the south and the village of Klobuk in the north.

It is believed to have been built in the 9th century. In the work of Constantine Porphyrogenitus De Administrando Imperio in the middle of the 10th century, he mentions a town in the parish of Vrm in the county of Travunija. The fortress is also mentioned during the reign of archon Stefan Vojislav in the 11th century. The town of Klobuk was part of the state of Nemanjić until 1321, when this area passed into the hands of Bosnian rulers. It was first in the possession of the Sankovićs, and then from 1395 to 1442 in the possession of the Pavlovićs, who took it from Sankovićs. Then in 1442, it was taken over from Pavlović by Stjepan Vukčić Kosač sometime before 1442. During the 15th century, it was governed by a knyaz on behalf of the lord, and also had the castellan as a military commander.

The Ottomans captured Klobuk in 1477, and since then an Ottoman army crew has been stationed in the fortress until 1878, when they offered fierce resistance to Austro-Hungarian forces. The fortress gained importance after the Peace of Karlovac in 1699, when it became a prominent point towards the possessions of Venetia in Dalmatia and towards Montenegro. During the Ottomans, it belonged to the Sanjak of Herzegovina.

Inside Klobuk, in front of the former church, on the foundations of which the mosque was built, there is a stećak tombstone of the nobleman Vukosav Zemlić, on which it is inscribed „Асе лежи Вукосав Землић”. Today, only towers up to 6 meters high are preserved, and some walls.

== See also ==
- Trebišnjica
- Blagaj
- Drijeva

== Bibliography ==
- Ševo, Ljiljana (2004). Културна баштина Републике Српске. Нови Сад: Православна реч. p. 80. ISBN 978-86-7530-116-5.
- Markovic, Slobodanka (1988). "20.298 KLOBUK". Arheološka Nalazišta Regija 14 - 25 [Archaeological Sites Region 14 - 25]. Arheoloski Leksikon Bosne I Hercegovine [Archaeological Lexicon Of Bosnia And Herzegovina] (in Bosnian). Vol. 3. Sarajevo: Zemaljski Muzej Bosne I Hercegovine [National Museum Of Bosnia And Herzegovina]. p. 183.
  Археолошки лексикон Босне и Херцеговине. Vol. 3. Sarajevo: Земаљски музеј Босне и Херцеговине. 1988. p. 183 – via Scribd.
- Spasić, Dušan; Palavestra, Aleksandar; Mrđenović, Dušan (1991). Родословне таблице и грбови српских династија и властеле. Београд. p. 191. ISBN 978-86-7685-007-5.
- Kovačević-Kojić, Desanka (1978). Градска насеља средњовјековне босанске државе. Сарајево: Веселин Маслеша. p. 238. OCLC 762556310.
