= Vlastelin =

Vlastelin (pl. vlastelini) is the Slavic language word for the "magnate", derived from vlast ("rule, power, authority, government, management, office"). Other words are velmoža and velikaš, sometimes used interchangeably, particularly to designate regional lords. Vlastelin was used when referring to the highest and most powerful nobility in the Balkans. The word "vlastela" is mentioned for the first time in the book "Nomokanon Svetog Save", from 1219, where the Greek word "Archon"(ἄρχων), is translated into Serbian vlastel, knez, boljar. Also, in Serbia and Croatia of the era, the velikaš and velmoža were most likely terms used in place of vlastelin. From vlastelin, the term vlastelinčić was derived for lower or lesser vlastelin status.

In Eastern Europe, the equivalent term would be boyar.

Titles used by the higher nobility in medieval Bosnia include Grand duke (person in command of military) in Bosnia specifically Grand Duke of Bosnia, Knyaz, Duke, Prince, etc.

== See also ==
- Velikaš
