= Tilava =

Tilava Тилава
- Village
- Location within Bosnia and Herzegovina
- Coordinates: 43°48′26″N 18°24′49″E
- Country: Bosnia and Herzegovina
- Entity: Republika Srpska
- Municipality: Istočno Novo Sarajevo
- Time zone: UTC+1 (CET)
  - Summer (DST): UTC+2 (CEST)

Tilava (Serbian Cyrillic: Тилава) is a village in the Istočno Sarajevo in Istočno Novo Sarajevo municipality, Republika Srpska, Bosnia and Herzegovina.
