= Borač (fortress) =

Borač Castle
- Old Town Borač
- Prača, Bosnia and Herzegovina
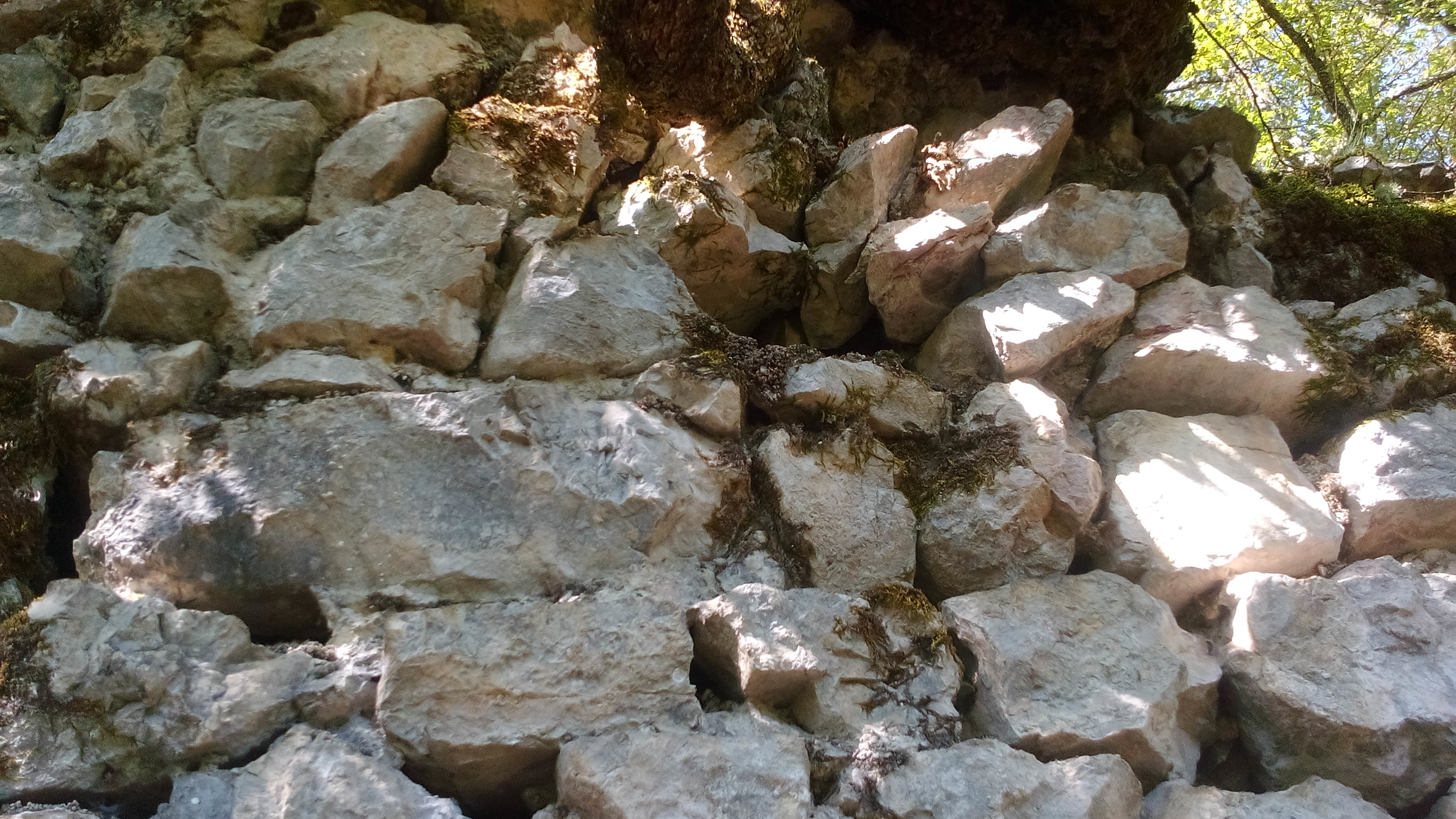
- Walls of Borač castle

Site information
- Type: Castle (residential, fortification)
- Owner: Radinović-Pavlović family
- Controlled by: Pavle Radenović 1381–d. 1415; Radislav Pavlović 1415–?; Petar Pavlović-Radinović 1415–?; Banate of Bosnia, Kingdom of Bosnia, Ottoman Empire
- Condition: Ruined (National Monument of Bosnia and Herzegovina)

Location
- Location within Bosnia and Herzegovina
- Coordinates: 43.755189°N 18.964053°E

Site history
- Built: around 1244
- Built by: Radislav Pavlović, head of Radinović-Pavlović
- In use: 1244-1485
- Materials: Limestone
- Demolished: 1485

Garrison information
- Past commanders: Radinović-Pavlović
- Site is protected as National Monument of Bosnia and Herzegovina by the Government of BiH and its KONS

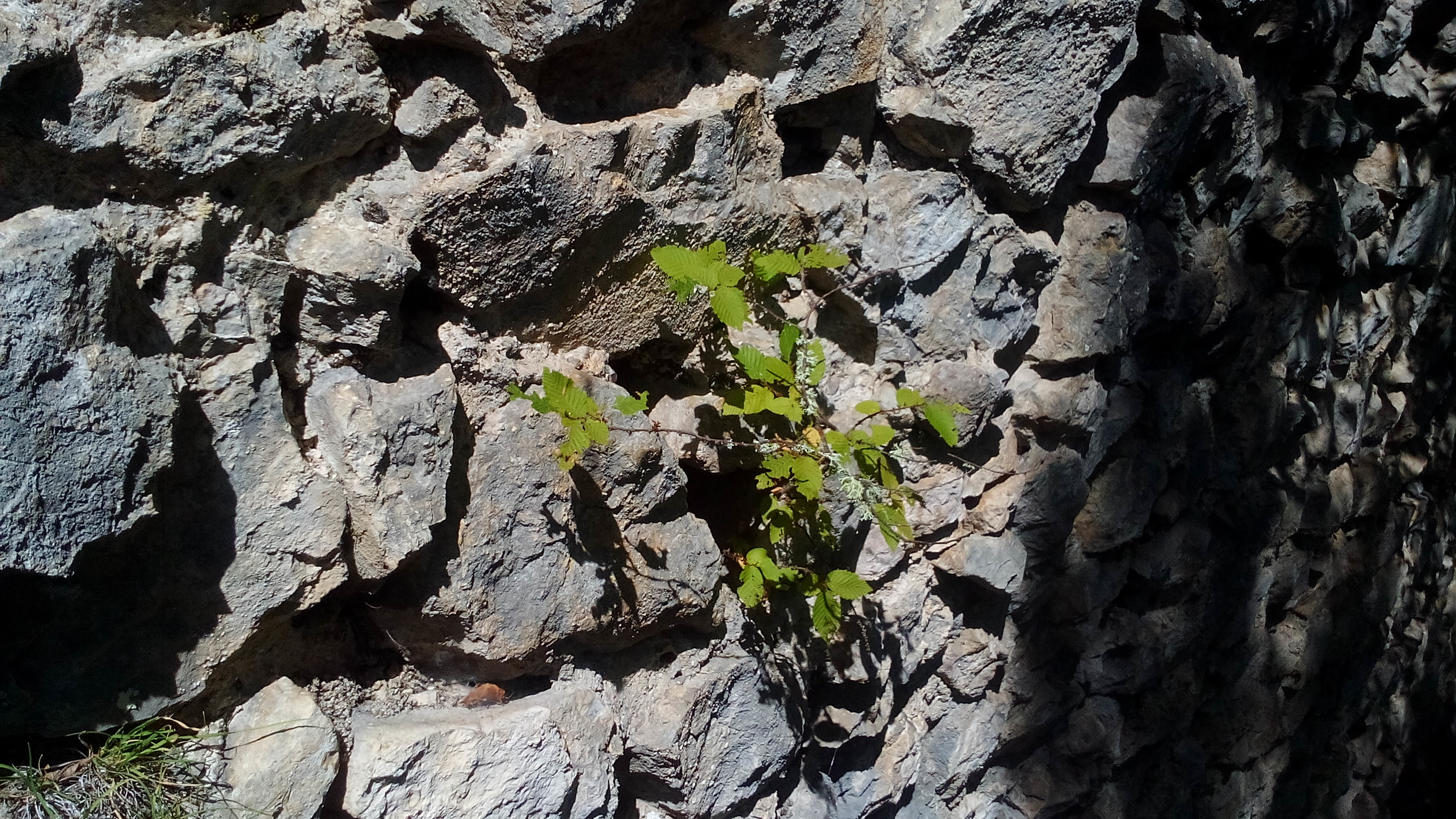
Walls of Borač, National monument of Bosnia and Herzegovina

The Borač Castle (Serbian Cyrillic: Борач) was a noble court and one of the largest and most important fortified towns of medieval Bosnia, situated on top of rugged slopes high above the Prača river canyon, between Mesići and Brčigovo, near modern-day Rogatica, in Bosnia and Herzegovina. The fortified castle was the seat of the Pavlović noble family.

== Old and New structure ==
The family hailed and ruled from Borač. It is the first of two castles in their possession, which family used as a seat. Two castles were built in space of several decades and within few kilometers from each other, the second being Pavlovac, sometimes called New Borač or New Town.

=== Pavlovac ===
The new castle or New Town or New Borač is actually called Pavlovac, and is considered to be a new structure, also known simply as Novi (English: New) or Novi Grad (English: New Town), situated on top of rugged slopes above the Prača river canyon, near modern days Prača village, in Bosnia and Herzegovina. Problem exist in correct dating of its construction, but some medieval charters suggest 1392, or late 14th century, as time of its construction, during Radislav Pavlović at the family's helm.

=== Old Borač ===
However, historians are certain that another Radinović-Pavlović fortress, original and older Borač than usually described Borač castle, existed, which was built around 1244 in the 13th century and located just a few kilometers downstream Prača river from New Town, near the location of present-day village Borač at 43.738581°N 19.019926°E.

== See also ==
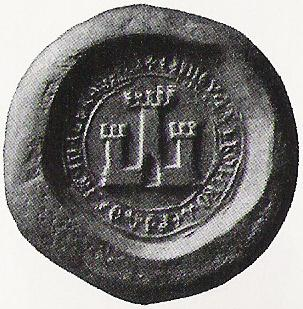
Seal of Radoslav Pavlović, head of Radinović-Pavlović medieval Bosnian noble family, with depiction of their court, Borač or Pavlovac castle.

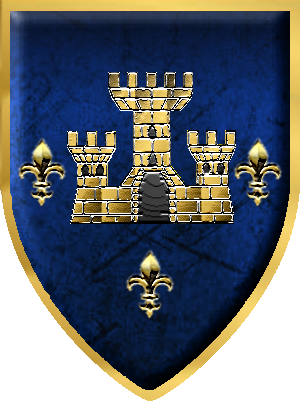
Borač or Pavlovac castle on Radinović-Pavlović family blazon.
- Pavlovac (fortress)
- Radinović-Pavlović
- List of fortifications in Bosnia and Herzegovina
