= Boris Nilević =

Bosnian historian

- Born: June 2, 1947; Sarajevo
- Died: December 11, 1999 (aged 52); Sarajevo
- Resting place: Gradsko groblje Bare *
- Other name
- Education: Master's degree in 1978 at History Department of the Faculty of Philosophy Sarajevo; PhD in 1986 at University of Belgrade
- Alma mater: University of Sarajevo
- Occupations: Historian, medievalist
- Years active: 1969–1999
- Known for: Study of Bosnia in the Middle Ages
- Notable work: On medieval Bosnian citizen; Serb Orthodox Church in Bosnia and Herzegovina; Vojvoda Ivaniš Pavlović; Iz života posljednjih Pavlovića; Učešće vojvode Petra i kneza Nikole Pavlovića u političkom životu srednjovjekovne Bosne;
- Awards
- Honours

Boris Nilević (Sarajevo, June 2, 1947 – Sarajevo, December 11, 1999) was a Bosnian historian of the middle ages and early modern era.

Boris Nilević was born on June 2, 1947, in Sarajevo. He completed primary and secondary education in his hometown. He completed his history studies at the History Department of the Faculty of Philosophy of the University of Sarajevo in Sarajevo. He received his master's degree in 1978 and his doctorate in 1986 in Belgrade. From 1974 until his death on December 11, 1999, he worked at the Public institution Institute of History in Sarajevo. He was the director of the Institute of History and the editor of the journal Prilozi instituta za istoriju (trans. Contributions of the Institute of History). He occasionally worked at the History Department of the Faculty of Philosophy in Sarajevo and at the History Department of the Faculty of Philosophy in Tuzla.

The subject of Nilević's scientific interest was the Bosnian late Middle Ages and the Ottoman period with a focus on ethnic and confessional changes caused by the arrival of Ottoman rule in Bosnia and Herzegovina. He published several works on the Pavlović family and the Serbian Orthodox Church in Bosnia and Herzegovina.

== Works ==
Selection of works from Nilević's bibliography:

- Srpska pravoslavna crkva u Bosni i Hercegovini do obnove Pećke patrijaršije, Veselin Masleša, Biblioteka Kulturno nasljeđe, Sarajevo 1990.
- Vojvoda Ivaniš Pavlović, Prilozi Instituta za istoriju XIV/14-15, Sarajevo 1978., 349–361.
- Iz života posljednjih Pavlovića, Godišnjak Društva istoričara Bosne i Hercegovine 28–30 (1977–1979), Sarajevo 1979., 59–74.
- Učešće vojvode Petra i kneza Nikole Pavlovića u političkom životu srednjovjekovne Bosne, Prilozi Instituta za istoriju XVI/17, Sarajevo 1980., 61–68.
- Kulturna misija Srpske pravoslavne crkve u Bosni i Hercegovini, Prilozi Instituta za istoriju XX/21, Sarajevo 1985., 115–140.
- Pitanje etničko-konfesionalnih promjena u Bosni i Hercegovini nastalih dolaskom osmanske vlasti, Prilozi Instituta za istoriju XXI/22, Sarajevo 1986, 221–233.
- Iz historijske geografije Srpske pravoslavne crkve u Bosni i Hercegovini 1463–1557. godine, Anali Gazi Husref-begove biblioteke 13–14, Sarajevo 1987., 209–217.
- Uloga i značaj manastira Mileševa u historiji srpskog naroda u Bosni i Hercegovini do obnove Pećke patrijaršije 1557. godine, "Mileševa u istoriji srpskog naroda", Srpska akademija nauka i umetnosti, Naučni skupovi 38, Odeljenje istorijskih nauka 6, Beograd 1987., 175–187.
- Prilog srpskoj crkvenoj organizaciji u Bosni i Hercegovini 1463–1557. godine, Prilozi za orijentalnu filologiju 37, Sarajevo 1988., 173–185.
- Iz migrantske psihologije srpskog naroda u Bosni i Hercegovini u XV i XVI stoljeću, Migracioni procesi i Bosna i Hercegovina od ranog srednjeg vijeka do najnovijih dana njihov uticaj i posljedice na demografska kretanja i promjene u našoj zemlji, 26. i 27. X 1989, u Sarajevu, in "Migracije i Bosna i Hercegovina", Institut za istoriju i Institut za izučavanje nacionalnih odnosa, Sarajevo 1990., 51–56.
- Neka zapažanja o srpsko-pravoslavnoj duhovnosti u Bosni i Hercegovini u osmansko-turskom vremenu, Prilozi za orijentalnu filologiju 42–43 (1992–1993), Sarajevo 1995., 201–209.
- Osvrt na historiju Jevreja u Bosni i Hercegovini za vrijeme osmansko-turske uprave, in "Zbornik radova Sefard '92, Sarajevo, 11.09.-14.09 1992.", Institut za istoriju i Jevrejska zajednica u Bosni i Hercegovini, Sarajevo 1995., 47–56.
- Bosna i Osmansko Carstvo, in "Bosna i Hercegovina i svijet", Institut za istoriju, Sarajevo 1996., 65–74.
- O srednjovjekovnom bosanskom građaninu, in "Urbano biće i Bosna i Hercegovina", Institut za istoriju – Međunarodni centar za mir, Sarajevo 1996., 29–36.
- O postanku stare pravoslavne crkve u Sarajevu, in "Prilozi historiji Sarajeva, Radovi sa znanstvenog simpozija Pola milenija Sarajeva, održanog 19. do 21. marta 1993. godine", Orijentalni institut – Institut za istoriju, Sarajevo 1997., 61–65.
- Mostar u djelu historičara Vladimira Ćorovića, Hercegovina 9, Mostar 1997., 151–157.
- Srebrenik u srednjem vijeku na historijskoj sceni, Biljeg Srebrenika 1, Srebrenik 2003., 39–51.

== Bibliography ==
- Ibrahim Karabegović, Prof. dr. Boris Nilević (1947.-1999.), Prilozi Instituta za istoriju 29, Sarajevo 2000., 475–478.
- Ibrahim Karabegović, Veliki gubitak za bh. historiografiju (Na vijest o smrti prof. dr. Borisa Nilevića), Oslobođenje 56/18969, Sarajevo 15.12. 1999, 13.
- Rade Mihaljčić, Nilević Boris, "Enciklopedija srpske istoriografije (Prepared by Sima Ćirković i Rade Mihaljčić)", Knowledge, Beograd 1997, 538.
- Budimir Miličić, Bibliografija izdanja Instituta za istoriju u Sarajevu i radova saradnika Instituta za period 1959–1999. godine, Institut za istoriju, Sarajevo 2000.
- Esad Kurtović, Bibliografija prof. dr Borisa Nilevića, Bosna franciscana XIV/24, Sarajevo 2006, 113–122.
