= Drijeva =

Medieval market town in Bosnia and Herzegovina

Narenta
- Drijeva
- Gabela; Near Čapljina in Bosnia and Herzegovina
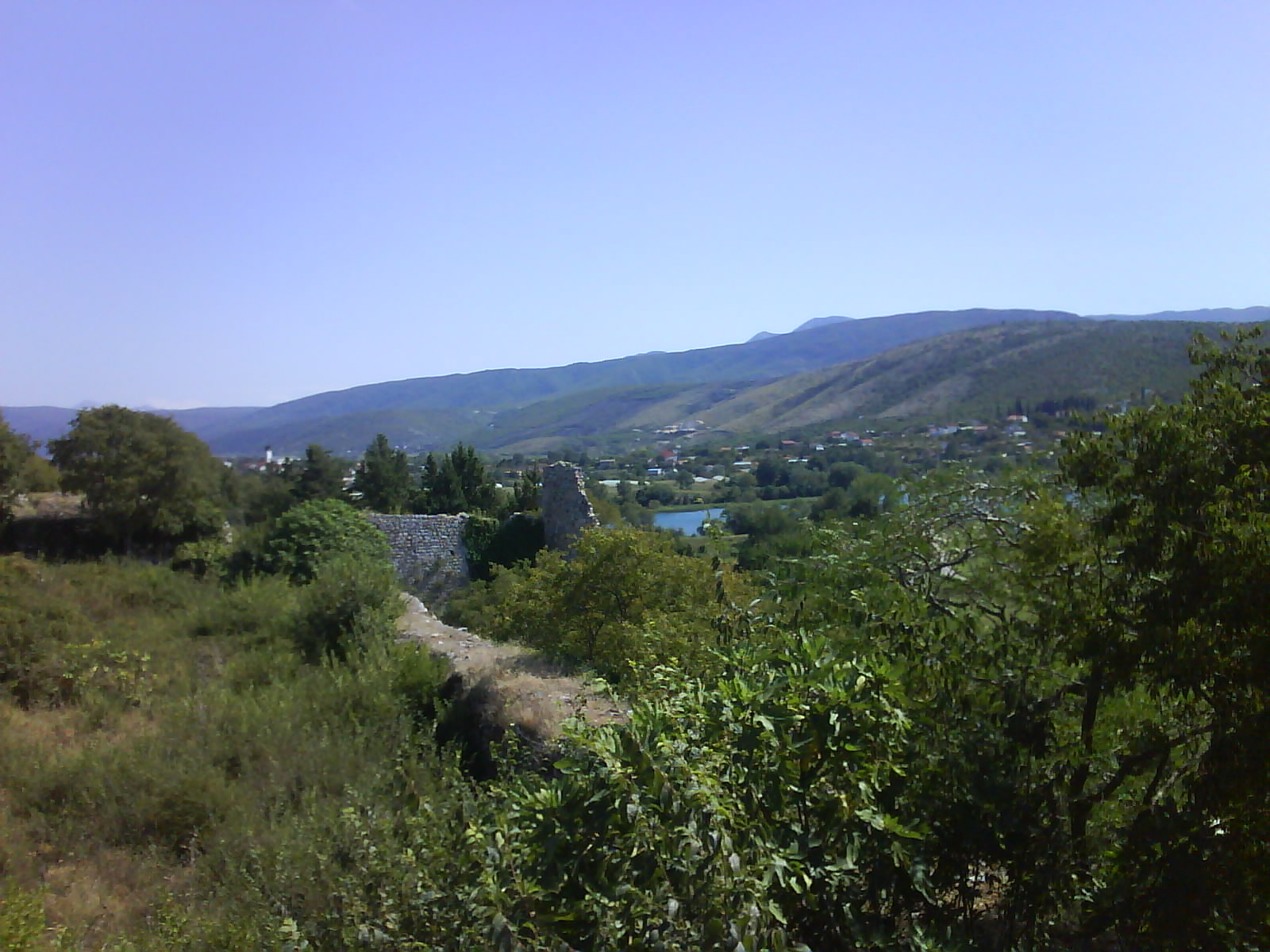
- Drijeva fort overlooking the Neretva river.

Site information
- Condition: ruin

Location
- Interactive location map, Bosnia and Herzegovina
- Coordinates: 43.06121°N 17.69409°E

Garrison information
- Designations

KONS of Bosnia and Herzegovina
- Official name: "Gabela near Capljina, the archaeological site (1318)".
- Type: Category II cultural monument
- Criteria: II. Value - Criteria for designation A, B, D i., E iii., F ii.iii., G v., I iii.
- Designated: 6 November 2002 (?th session)
- Reference no.: 1318
- Decision (Protocol) no.: 01-274/02
- Status: National Monuments of Bosnia and Herzegovina

Drijeva, also known as Narenta, was a medieval customs and market town located on the banks of Donja Neretva in what is today the village of Gabela, Bosnia and Herzegovina. At the time, the town is also referred to as Narenta, especially in official contemporary documents, often written outside of Bosnia and in Latin and Venetian It was held by the Kingdom of Serbia until the War of Hum (1326–29), when it was passed to the Banate and then Kingdom of Bosnia. It was an early colony of the Republic of Ragusa established in the second half of the 14th century.

== History ==
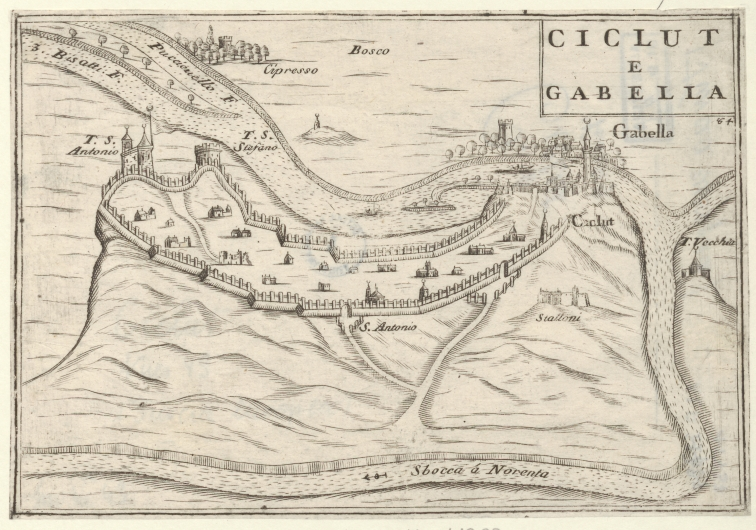
Drijeva on an old hand-drawn map.

In ancient times, the city of Narona existed in the area of medieval Drijeva. In the written sources of Dubrovnik archive (at the time Ragusa), Drijeva appears under the name of Lat. Narenti, forum Narenti, mercatum. The first mention dates back to 1186, when the Serbian župan Stefan Nemanja gave the Ragusans freedom to trade in Drijeva's market. Around 1280 the market was owned by George, the son of Prince Andria. The trade with and entire Neretva region became part of the Bosnian state under the Bosnian ban Stjepan II Kotromanić, who added entire region with Zahumlje, Travunija, Primorije and Narenta, to his realm as Hum in 1326 and placed it under Kosača family over-lordship. At the beginning of the 14th century, invading Serbia took control over the town for a brief period of time. Ragusans, who traded in Drijeva, paid up to six thousand ducats (1356) annually for the rent. From 1357 to 1382, the market was part of the possession of the Hungarian King Louis I. Since 1404, Drijeva was owned by Bosnian duke Hrvoje Vukčić, from 1410 by Bosnian duke Sandalj Hranić, and from 1435 by Hranić's nephew, Bosnian duke Stjepan Vukčić, followed by the Bosnian King Stjepan Tomaš. The Neretva Valley brought goods in and out of Bosnia, including salt, livestock products and metal products. The famous Bosnian slave market, known from the 11th century, was also located here. Thus, in 1080, a slave named Marko, the son of Radoslav from Neretva was sold in Drijeva. At the market-town there was a customs building, salt warehouses. The Church of St. Vitus (Serbo-Croatian: Sveti Vid) in Drijeva was first mentioned in 1405 (Latin: san Vido, Sancto Vido in Narente). Bishop Lysych, who visited these lands in 1668 and 1670, reports that the church of St. Vitus is built of stone and in ruins. At present, the village called Vid exists in Croatia across the border from Bosnia, some 4 km from the site of the ancient city of Narona and medieval Drijeva, and the new church of St. Vitus built on the site of a medieval one. In Drijeva there was also a less popular church of St. Mary, which is mentioned in 1434 and 1443. In 1448, the Ottomans burned the town. In 1452, the Venetians founded a new settlement on the opposite bank of Neretva. The first to point to the modern village of Gabela as the location of medieval Drijeva was Konstantin Jireček. In the past, the Neretva River was a little to the west.

== List of known merchants ==
Ragusan merchants Michaeli de Resti (Latin: Michaeli de Resti; fl. 1389–96) and Stefanus Marini (Latin: Stefanus Marini; fl. 1389–d. 1401) imported salt from Valona to Drijeva. Marini's creditor was Ragusan merchant Radin Ilić (Latin: Radinus Hilich; fl. 1391–92) from Drijeva. Many merchants came from Drijeva. Names of individuals from Drijeva have been recorded in documents; examples include: Novak Radosalić (1406), powerful merchant Ostoja Radosalić (fl. 1419–32), servant Maroje Radosalić (fl. 1436–49), Radivoj Bosnić (January 1442), Vladislav Radosalić (fl. 1449–53), Radonja Radosalić (fl. 1457–64), and brothers Marko and Maroje Bosnić (1457).

== See also ==
- Walled town of Počitelj
- Walled town of Jajce

== Sources ==
- Kurtović, Esad (2009). Радосалићи - примјер "једнократних презимена" средњега вијека. Istorijski institut Beograd. pp. 39, 61, 62, 63, 66, 78, 79, 80, 103. GGKEY:WUKYQDYP46L.
- Malović-Đukić, Marica (1998) [1997]. "Delatnost Stefana Marinova u drugoj polovini XIV veka". Историјски часопис. 44. Istorijski institut: 103–110. GGKEY:9A9KJ15QHZU.
- Mišić, Siniša (1997). "Ston i Pelješac od 1326. do 1333. godine". Историјски часопис. 42–43. Istorijski institut: 25–32. GGKEY:8N4K5PNPTJC.
- Tošić, Đuro (1987). Trg Drijeva u srednjem vijeku. Veselin Masleša.
