= Korjenići =

Coordinates: 42°42′47″N 18°31′56″E

Korjenići (Serbian Cyrillic: Корјенићи), also historically known as Vrm (Врм), is a historical region and medieval župa in south-east Bosnia and Herzegovina, in the region of East Herzegovina, several kilometers north-east of Trebinje, around a village of Klobuk. It was known as Vrm until the 18th century, being a historical župa (county) in the Middle Ages. It was mentioned in the Chronicle of the Priest of Duklja (ca. 1300) as one of ten župas of Travunija.

== Sources ==
- Dedijer, Jevto (1991). Hercegovina: antropogeografske studije. Veselin Masleša.
- Tošić, Đuro; Isailović, Neven (2014). "Жупа Врм и град Клобук у средњем вијеку" (PDF). Клобук кроз историју: међународни тематски зборник (Научни симпозијум: Требиње, 27-28. јун 2013).
