= Klobuk, Trebinje =

Klobuk Клобук
- Village
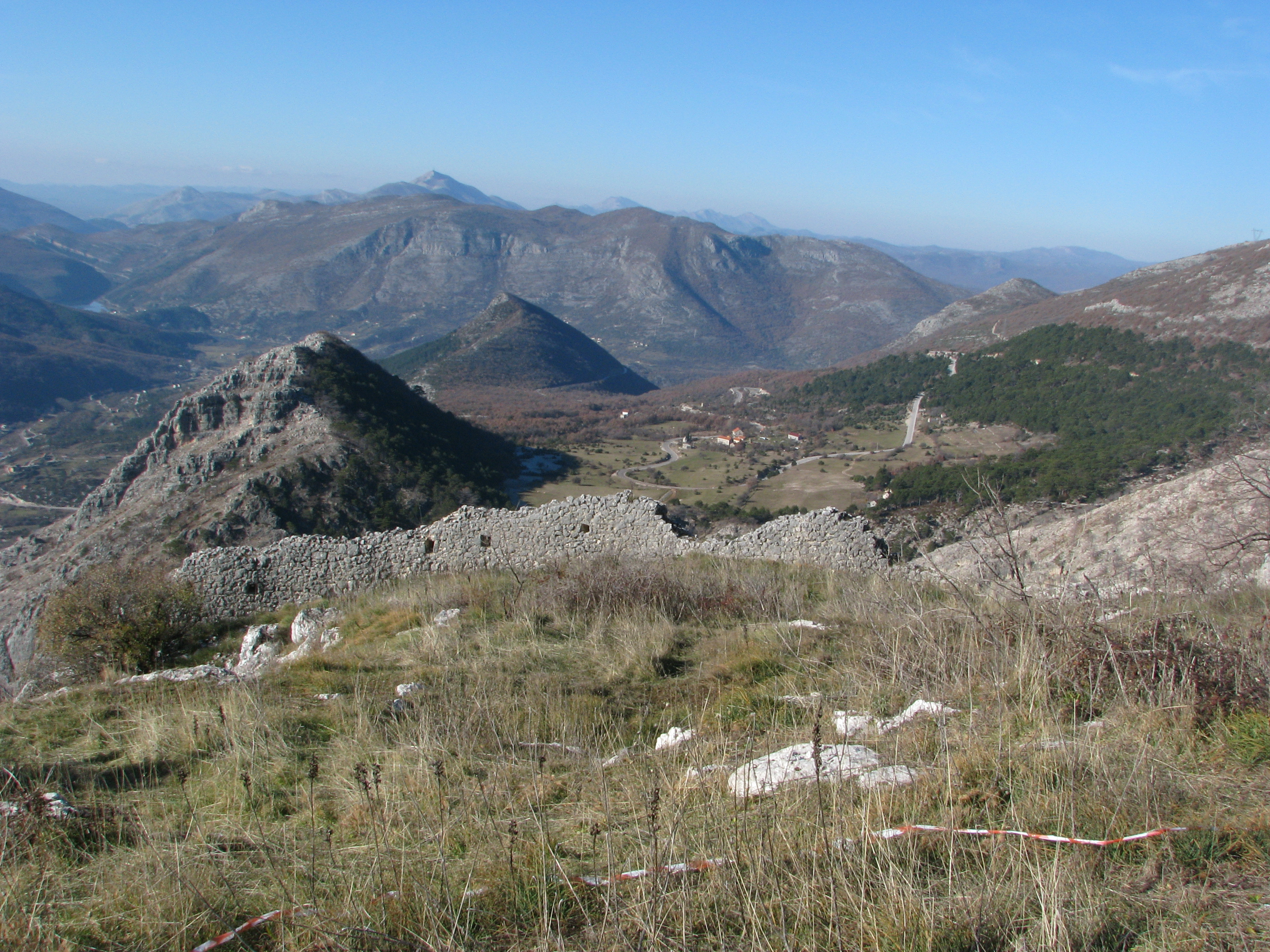
- Old town Klobuk, Klobuk, Trebinje

- Location within Republika Srpska Location within Bosnia and Herzegovina
- Coordinates: 42°42′47″N 18°31′56″E
- Country: Bosnia and Herzegovina
- Entity: Republika Srpska
- Municipality: Trebinje
- Time zone: UTC+1 (CET)
  - Summer (DST): UTC+2 (CEST)

Klobuk (Serbian Cyrillic: Клобук) is a village in the municipality of Trebinje, Republika Srpska, Bosnia and Herzegovina. The village lends its name to the local border crossing with Montenegro which lies on the main road between Trebinje and Montenegro's second largest city Nikšić. It was also the birthplace of the beylerbey of Bosnia Gazi Hasan-paša Predojević.

== History ==
Klobuk is first mentioned in the 11th century as a fortress of the Prince of Zeta, Vojislav. From the twelfth century it was in the possession of the Nemanjić dynasty; since 1377 as part of the Bosnian state; from 1395. It was ruled by the Pavlovići, and in 1448 it was ruled by Stjepan Vukčić. The Turks conquered it in 1477 and at the beginning of the 18th century it was specially fortified. After the Peace of Karlovac (1699), he is the most advanced of the Trebinje region towards Montenegro, Venice and Dalmatia. whose. Austro-Hungary occupied it in 1878.
