= Hazim Šabanović =

Bosnian and Yugoslav historian (1916–1971)

- Born: 11 January 1916; Poriječani, Visoko
- Died: 22 March 1971 (aged 55); Istanbul
- Occupation: Ottoman studies
- Awards: 1968 Šestoaprilska nagrada grada Sarajeva

Hazim Šabanović (Poriječani, Visoko, 11 January 1916 – Istanbul, 22 March 1971) was a Yugoslav historian, orientalist, and Ottomanist. He was Scientific advisor of the Oriental Institute in Sarajevo. He died in Istanbul, where he was searching for new data in libraries and archives for what would become a seminal work, the Literature of Bosnian Muslims in Oriental Languages, published posthumously in 1973. The mixed high school center in Visoko bears his name.

== Early life and education ==
Born 1916, in Poriječani, Visoko, Bosnia and Herzegovina, where he finished elementary school. He went on to graduate from the Gazi Husrevbeg madrasa in 1936, which was a secondary level school. He obtained a higher education degree from the Higher Sharia School in Sarajevo, where he graduated in 1940, acquiring education in Islamic legal sciences and in traditional Islamic-Arabic disciplines, especially knowledge of Arabic, Turkish and the basics of Persian languages. In 1956, he obtained his PhD. at the Faculty of Philosophy, University of Belgrade to become a Doctor of Historical Sciences. He later served as prefect of a boarding high school in 1941, and as a court intern until the fall of 1942. He then transferred to the National Museum in Sarajevo, where he served as a curator-intern, between 1942 and 1945, managing the Turkish Archive. At the end of World War II, in 1945, he served as a secretary of the Committee "for assistance to refugees from Southeastern Bosnia and Sandžak". For brief period of time, at the end of WWII, he was imprisoned on suspicion of pro-Croatian stance during the war.

== Biography ==
After World War II, Šabanović served in the City People's Committee in Sarajevo and worked on organizing the Archives of the City of Sarajevo until 1948, when he was transferred to the Faculty of Law with the task of collecting and processing Turkish sources for legal history, where he remained until 1950. Then the Oriental Institute was founded in Sarajevo, where he was appointed head of the Linguistic and Literary Department. In July 1952, he was elected a scientific associate of the Institute. In the fall of 1953, he was assigned to work at the Faculty of Philosophy in Belgrade, where he taught Turkish language and diplomacy to history students until 1957. In 1962, he was elected as a scientific adviser, title he held until his death. With the exception of the time spent in Belgrade, he was the permanent head of the Philological and later the Historical Department of the Oriental Institute and a member of the Editorial Board of the Supplement for Oriental Philology. Since 1958, he has been the main, and since 1969, responsible editor of that magazine. At the same time, he was a member of the editorial boards of Monumenta Turcica and Special Editions of the Institute. Šabanović also worked in the position of librarian, administrator and member of the Council of the Gazi Husrev-bey Library. Šabanović assumed the position of Library administrator on 17 October 1948, and remained closely affiliated to it until the end of his life. He worked on finding and purchasing documents, enriching the Library's funds and laying the foundation for the modern way of processing library materials. He promoted the institution with his works and reputation, and was the first to write an elaborate scientific research about its funds, especially about its history as well as the works and achievements of other authors in the Library. He was a member of the Library Council from 1966 until his death in 1971. He was also a member of the first editorial board of the Gazi Husrev-bey Library Annals, and scientific editor of the first volume of the Library's Catalog of Arabic, Turkish and Persian Manuscripts. His activities affirmed and improved the work of the Library in academic and the public discourse of Yugoslavia.

The four most important published books are: Krajište Isa-bega Ishakovića (published by the Oriental Institute in Sarajevo, 1965), Turkish Sources for the History of Belgrade (Belgrade Archives, 1965), Putopis Evlije Čelebije (Travelogue of Evliya Çelebi) (excerpts about Yugoslav countries - Veselin Masleša, Sarajevo 1967) and Bosnian Pashaluk (Scientific Society of SR BiH, Sarajevo 1959). In a series of his notable works, one of the most valuable is the Putopis Evlije Čelebije (Travelogue of Evliya Çelebi) (excerpts about Yugoslav countries). Šabanović has been studying, processing and translating that Travelogue for almost 15 years. The result of this work is the publication of those chapters of this extensive work that relate to the Yugoslav countries. Considering that that period of our history under the Turks is scarce in sources. Through his scientific work, Hazim Šabanović wrote and published a total of 57 entries in several encyclopedias. Their value is all the greater because many of them are real articles, and almost all of them were available to the wider intellectual public for the first time. Their value is enormous because for the first time we get information about certain personalities and concepts, and on a scientific basis written historically. Among the most significant works of Šabanović is the Bosnian pashaluk, so far only the first part has been published, while the second part of this work is in manuscript. Until the appearance of this work, there was no systematic account of the administrative division and organization of any province of the Ottoman Empire. The work is based on a very large number of first-class sources and extensive literature and as such represents a significant contribution to science, and especially to the knowledge of Bosnia under Ottoman rule.

He died in Istanbul in 1971, while researching in city's libraries and archives for what will become a seminal work, the Literature of Bosnian Muslims in Oriental Languages, published posthumously in 1973 in Sarajevo.

== Legacy ==
The mixed high school center in Visoko, Bosnia and Herzegovina, bears his name.

== Awards ==
- 1968. - Šestoaprilska nagrada grada Sarajeva.

== Works ==
- Gramatika turskog jezika s vježbenicom, čitankom i rječnikom, Naklada knjižare H. Ahmed Kijundžić, Sarajevo, 1944
- Šemsu-l-ulema Hadži Mehmed ef. Handžić, El-Hidaje br. 2-3, Sarajevo, 1944
- Dvije najstarije vakufname u Bosni i Hercegovine, Prilozi za orijentalnu filologiju, Sarajevo, 1951
- Hazim Šabanović: Izrazi evail, evasit i evahir u datumima turskih spomenika - Les expressions: "évail, évasit et évahir" dans les dates des documents turcs, Prilozi za orijentalnu filologiju, vol. II/1951, pp. 213–237.
- Hazim Šabanović: Natpisi na nadgrobnim spomenicima Malkoč bega i njegovog sina Džaferbega - Inscriptions sur les monuments funéraires de Malkotch bey et de son fils Djafer bey, Prilozi za orijentalnu filologiju, vol. II/1951, pp. 249–258.
- Hazim Šabanović: Turski diplomatički izvori za istoriju naših naroda /Turkish diplomatic sources for the history of our peoples/, Prilozi za orijentalnu filologiju, vol. I, 1950, pp. 117–149.
- Hazim Šabanović: Natpis na Kasapčića mostu u Užicu i njegov autor pjesnik Džari Čelebi /The inscription on the Kasapčić bridge at Užice and its author poet Jari Chelebi/, Prilozi za orijentalnu filologiju, vol. I, 1950, pp. 156–161.
- Dr. Hazim Šabanović, Mu´stafa b. Ysuf Aiyub al-Mostari. Biobibliografska skica - Mu´stafa - b. Yusuf Aiyub al-Mostari. Biobibliographical sketch, Prilozi za orijentalnu filologiju, vol. VIII-IX/1960, pp. 29–35.
- Bosanski pašaluk, Sarajevo, 1959
- Krajište Isa-bega Ishakovića – Zbirni katastarski popis iz 1455.godine, Orijentalni institut, Sarajevo, 1964
- Evlija Čelebi, Putopis, prijevod, uvod i komentar, Sarajevo, 1967
- Bosanski divan, Prilozi za orijentalnu filologiju, vol. XVIII-XIX/1973, pp. 9–45
- Književnost Muslimana BiH na orijentalnim jezicima (biobibliografija), Sarajevo, 1973
- Enciklopedija Jugoslavije (2 Bje-Crn), Zagreb, 1982.
