= Marko Vego =

Bosnian and Yugoslavian archaeologist and historian (1907–1985)

- Born: 8 January 1907; Čapljina, Bosnia and Herzegovina, Austria-Hungary
- Died: 26 February 1985 (aged 78); Sarajevo, SR Bosnia and Herzegovina, SFR Yugoslavia
- Resting place: Gradsko groblje Bare (English: City Cemetery Bare), Sarajevo
- Citizenship: Bosnia and Herzegovina, Yugoslavia
- Education: University of Freiburg; University of Zagreb
- Known for: Historijska karta srednjovjekovne bosanske države, Sarajevo, 1957, 1978 (English: Historical Map of Medieval Bosnian State, Sarajevo 1957, 1978)
- Awards: 27. juli
- Scientific career
- Fields: Historian, archaeologist, epigrapher
- Workplaces: State Real Gymnasium in Nikšić, Montenegro (teacher); Teacher Course in Trebinje (professor); Trebinje Partisan Gymnasium (principal); State Real Gymnasium in Mostar (principal); Teacher Course in Sarajevo (professor); National Museum of Bosnia and Herzegovina, Sarajevo (director)
- Thesis: History of Zachlumia from the coming of Slavs to uniting with Bosnia in 1322

Marko Vego (8 January 1907 – 26 February 1985) was a Bosnian and Yugoslav archaeologist, epigrapher and historian.

== Biography ==
Vego was born in Čapljina (Bosnia and Herzegovina) to father Jozo who was a worker at a tobacco station. Vego finished a Široki Brijeg classical gymnasium, the Faculty of Theology at the University of Freiburg (Germany) and the University of Zagreb (Croatia), Faculty of Philosophy also at the University of Zagreb and a professorial exam in Belgrade, Serbia. He wrote a doctoral thesis titled "History of Zachlumia from the coming of Slavs to uniting with Bosnia in 1322" (Serbo-Croatian: Povijest Humske Zemlje od doseljenja Slovena do sjedinjenja s Bosnom 1322 godine) at the Faculty of Philosophy in Zagreb. He did not present it due to some unexplained circumstances.

Vego worked as a history teacher at the State Real Gymnasium in Nikšić, Montenegro from 1938 to 1944. He also took part in the resistance movement in the Second World War. He was a professor at the first Teacher Course in Trebinje and advanced to the status of the Trebinje Partisan Gymnasium principal on February 22, 1945. In 1946 and 1947 he was the principal of the State Real Gymnasium in Mostar, Bosnia and Herzegovina, and since September 9, 1947 he worked as a professor at the Teacher Course in Sarajevo. In 1949–50 he was the principal of the Teacher School in Sarajvo. From August 28, 1950 to December 9, 1957 he was the director of the National Museum of Bosnia and Herzegovina in Sarajevo.

Marko Vego retired in 1965. He received several awards in Bosnia and Herzegovina for his work (the most important one is the "27. juli award"). Vego's subject of focus were mostly medieval times and he was best known for his work in archaeology, numismatics, epigraphy and topographical history of medieval Bosnia. He published more than 300 works. He died in Sarajevo.

== Bibliography ==
- Povijest Humske zemlje (Hercegovine), Samobor, 1937
- Ljubuški. Srednjovjekovni nadgrobni spomenici Bosne i Hercegovine VI, Sarajevo, 1954
- Don Ivan Musić i Hrvati u Hercegovačkom ustanku 1875.–1878. godine, Sarajevo, 1955 (self-published)
- Naselja srednjovekovne bosanske države, Sarajevo, 1957
- Historijska karta srednjovjekovne bosanske države, Sarajevo, 1957, 1978
- Historija Broćna od najstarijih vremena do turske okupacije, Sarajevo, 1961
- Zbornik srednjovjekovnih natpisa Bosne i Hercegovine I, Sarajevo, 1962
- Zbornik srednjovjekovnih natpisa Bosne i Hercegovine II, Sarajevo, 1964
- Zbornik srednjovjekovnih natpisa Bosne i Hercegovine III, Sarajevo, 1964
- Bekija kroz vijekove, Sarajevo, 1964
- Zbornik srednjovjekovnih natpisa Bosne i Hercegovine IV, Sarajevo, 1970
- Iz istorije srednjovjekovne Bosne i Hercegovine, Sarajevo, 1980
- Historija Brotnja od najstarijih vremena do 1878. godine, Čitluk, 1981
- Postanak srednjovjekovne bosanske države, Sarajevo, 1982
