= Pavlovac (fortress) =

Pavlovac Castle
- New Town Pavlovac
- Prača, Bosnia and Herzegovina
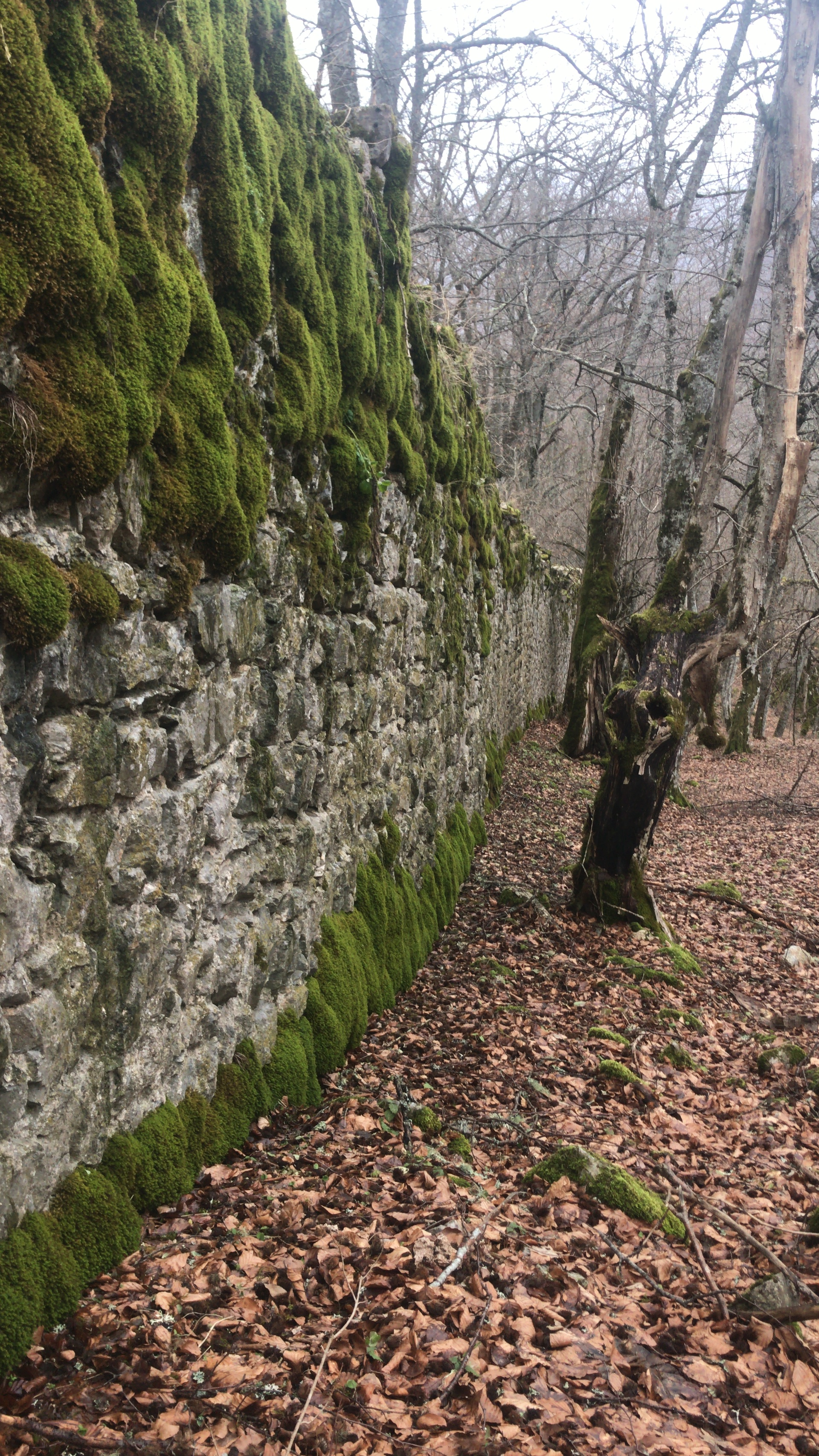
- Walls of Pavlovac, capital of the Pavlović family

Site information
- Type: Castle (residential, fortification)
- Owner: Radinović-Pavlović family
- Controlled by: Pavle Radenović 1381–d. 1415; Radislav Pavlović 1415–?; Petar Pavlović-Radinović 1415–?; Banate of Bosnia, Kingdom of Bosnia, Ottoman Empire
- Condition: Ruined (National Monument of Bosnia and Herzegovina)

Location
- Location within Bosnia and Herzegovina
- Coordinates: 43.752646°N 18.778214°E

Site history
- Built: c. 1392 (14th century)
- Built by: Radoslav Pavlović, head of Radinović-Pavlović
- In use: 1392-1485
- Materials: Limestone
- Demolished: 1485

Garrison information
- Past commanders: Radinović-Pavlović
- Site is protected as National Monument of Bosnia and Herzegovina by the Government of BiH and its KONS

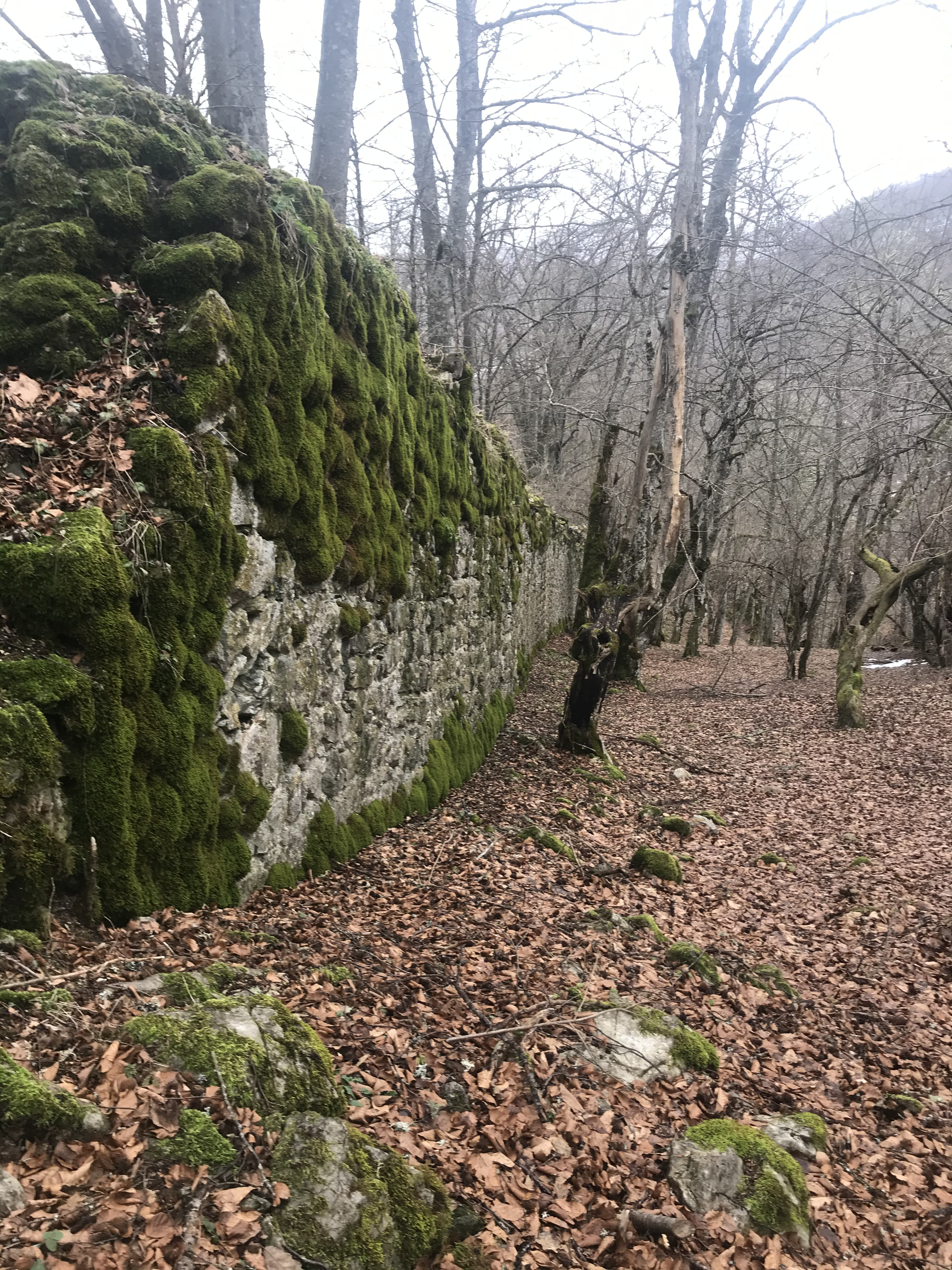
Walls of Pavlovac, National monument of Bosnia and Herzegovina

The Pavlovac Castle (Serbian Cyrillic: Павловац) was a noble court and one of the largest and most important fortified towns of medieval Bosnia, situated on top of rugged slopes high above the Prača river canyon, near modern days Prača village, in Bosnia and Herzegovina. The fortified castle was a seat of the medieval Bosnian noble family Radinović-Pavlović.

== Old and New structure ==
The family hailed and ruled from Pavlovac. It is the second of two castles in their possession, which the family used as a seat. Two castles were built in the space of several decades and within a few kilometers from each other, second being Borač castle or Old Town, and sometimes Old Borač.

=== Pavlovac ===
The new castle or New Town, or sometimes New Borač, is actually called Pavlovac, and is considered to be a new structure, also known simply as Novi (English: New) or Novi Grad (English: New Town). Problems exist in correct dating of its construction, but some medieval charters suggest 1392, or late 14th century, as time of its construction, during Radislav Pavlović at the family's helm.

=== Old Borač ===
However, historians are certain that another Radinović-Pavlović fortress, original and older Borač than usually described Borač castle, existed, which was built around 1244 in 13th century and located just a few kilometers downstream Prača river, near the location of present-day village Borač, between Mesići and Brčigovo village at 43.738581°N 19.019926°E,

== See also ==
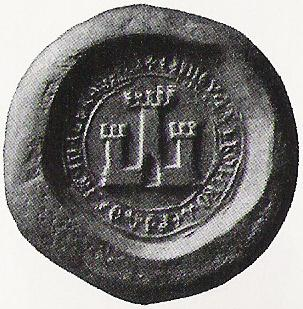
Seal of Radoslav Pavlović, head of Radinović-Pavlović medieval Bosnian noble family, with depiction of their court, Borač or Pavlovac castle.

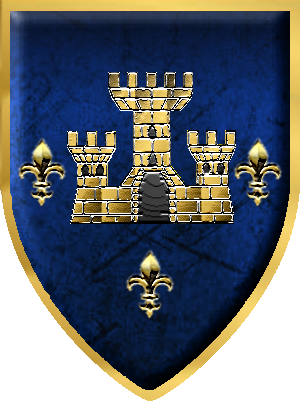
Borač or Pavlovac castle on Radinović-Pavlović family blazon
- Borač (fortress)
- Radinović-Pavlović
- List of fortifications in Bosnia and Herzegovina
