= Vrhbosna =

Old Bosnian name for present day city of Sarajevo

Coordinates: 43°52′N 18°25′E

Vrhbosna (Serbian Cyrillic: Врхбосна, pronounced [ʋř̩x.bo.sna]) was the medieval name of a small region in today's central Bosnia and Herzegovina, centered on an eponymous settlement (župa) that would later become part of the city of Sarajevo.

The meaning of the name of this Slavic župa is "the peak of Bosnia". The only known fortification in the area at the time was Hodidjed. The existence of a significant individual settlement of Vrhbosna was recorded in the 14th and 15th centuries. Vrhbosna was first attacked by the Ottoman Empire in 1416, and it was finally taken in 1451.

Vrhbosna persisted shortly after the Ottoman conquest of Bosnia in the name of local vilayet, but soon the name went out of use. In 1550, a Venetian traveller Caterino Zeno was the first westerner to use the term Sarraglio (Italianized form of Sarajevo) instead of Vrhbosna to describe the place.

It is nowadays known as the Roman Catholic Archdiocese of Vrhbosna, which is the archdiocese that currently serves the Catholics of Sarajevo.

== Literature ==
- Fine, John Van Antwerp Jr. (1994). The Late Medieval Balkans: A Critical Survey from the Late Twelfth Century to the Ottoman Conquest. The University of Michigan Press. ISBN 0472082604.
