= Grand Duke of Bosnia =

Noble title of the medieval Bosnian state

Grand Duke of Bosnia (Serbo-Croatian: veliki vojvoda rusaga bosanskog, Latin: Bosne supremus voivoda / Sicut supremus voivoda regni Bosniae) was a court title in the Bosnian medieval state, with its first holders being recorded around the middle of the 14th century. The title was bestowed by the monarch to its highest military commander, rarely two, usually reserved for the most influential and most capable among the highest most prominent Bosnian nobility highest Bosnian nobility. It was very much different from the Grand duke title found in Europe at the time. To interpret it as an office post rather than a court rank could be equally accurate, and although it was retained for life by a nobleman who gained it, it was not meant to be hereditary, at least not at first. although it was not hereditary at first, it served both purposes and was retained for life by a nobleman who gained it. However, in the last several decades of the Bosnian medieval state it became hereditary, which means it became more than just an office or a court rank.

== History ==
Unlike usage in Western Europe or Central Europe, as well as in various Slavic lands from Central to North-East Europe, where analogy between grand duke and grand prince was significant, with both titles corresponding to sovereign lower than king but higher than duke, in the Kingdom of Bosnia the title of grand duke corresponded more to the Byzantine military title megas doux.

Generally, the Slavic word knez often referred to the ruler, sometimes analogous to the king, thus veliki knez was more like a high king than a grand duke. In that sense, although like in the rest of South Slavic neighbouring states and among its nobility, in Bosnia also existed the title knez and veliki knez, nominally analogous to prince and grand prince, it was ranked as a medium to major feudal landlord, with corresponding influence in the Bosnian Stanak (also Great Bosnian Rusag (Serbo-Croatian: "veliki bosanski rusag"), Whole of Bosnia (Serbo-Croatian: "sva Bosna")), which was institute of assembly of all Bosnian nobility, regardless of rank and status.

However, in neighbouring countries, title duke, in Slavic vojvoda, also had military signification, but in that sense "grand duke" was specifically, even exclusively, a Bosnian title.

Accordingly, the title Grand Duke of Bosnia was explicitly given by Bosnian rulers, whether ban, king or queen, to their highest-ranking military commander. As such, it was an actually more like an office rather than a court rank, although it was also a grade in the court order of precedence, and was often held by one individual at the time, rarely two.

== Title-holders ==
Some of the most significant title-holders were:

- Vlatko Vuković (1380–until death in 1392)
- Hrvoje Vukčić Hrvatinić (1380–until death in 1416)
- Petar Pavlović (until death in March 1420)
- Radislav Pavlović (from 1420, first recorded 1427)
- Sandalj Hranić (1392–until death in 1435)
- Stjepan Vukčić Kosača (1435–until death in 1466)
- Ivaniš Pavlović
- Vladislav Hercegović (first recorded 1469–1482)

== See also ==
- List of grand dukes of Bosnia
- Kingdom of Bosnia
- Banate of Bosnia
- Medieval Bosnia
