= Prača, Pale, Bosnian-Podrinje Canton Goražde =

Village in Bosnia and Herzegovina

Prača
- Village
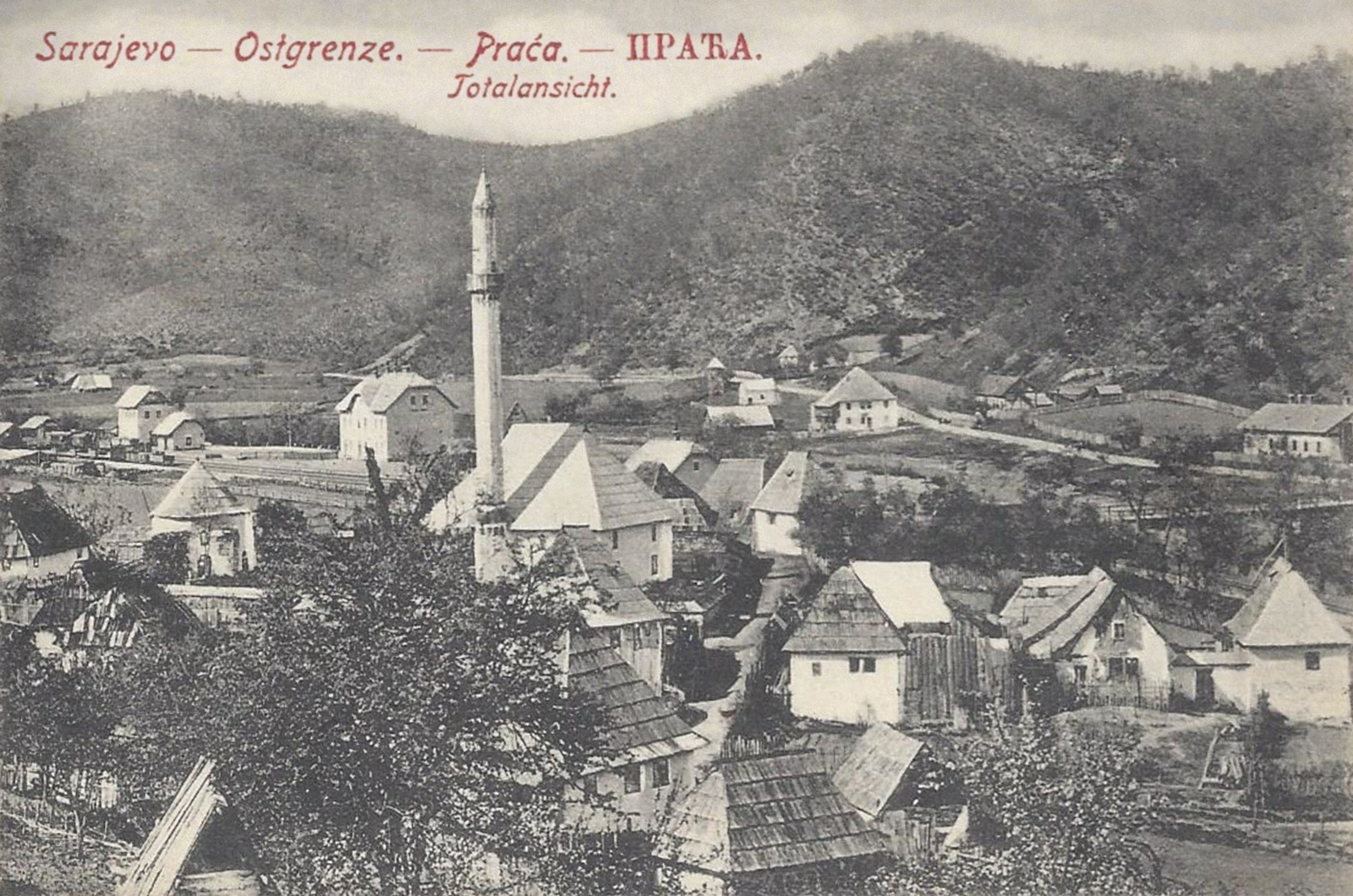

- Location within Bosnia and Herzegovina
- Country: Bosnia and Herzegovina
- Entity: Federation of Bosnia and Herzegovina
- Canton: Bosnian-Podrinje Goražde
- Municipality: Pale

Area
  - Total: 4.04 km^{2} (1.56 sq mi)

Population (2013)
  - Total: 270
  - Density: 67/km^{2} (170/sq mi)
- Time zone: UTC+1 (CET)
  - Summer (DST): UTC+2 (CEST)

Prača is a village in the Municipality of Pale in the Bosnian-Podrinje Canton Goražde of the Federation of Bosnia and Herzegovina, an entity of Bosnia and Herzegovina.

According to the 1991 census, the population was 1,873.

== Demographics ==
According to the 2013 census, its population was 304.

Ethnicity in 2013
Ethnicity	Number	Percentage
Bosniaks	270	88.82%
Serbs	29	9.54%
other/undeclared	5	0.9%
Total	304	100%
