= Bukovica (Trstionica) =

River in Bosnia and Herzegovina

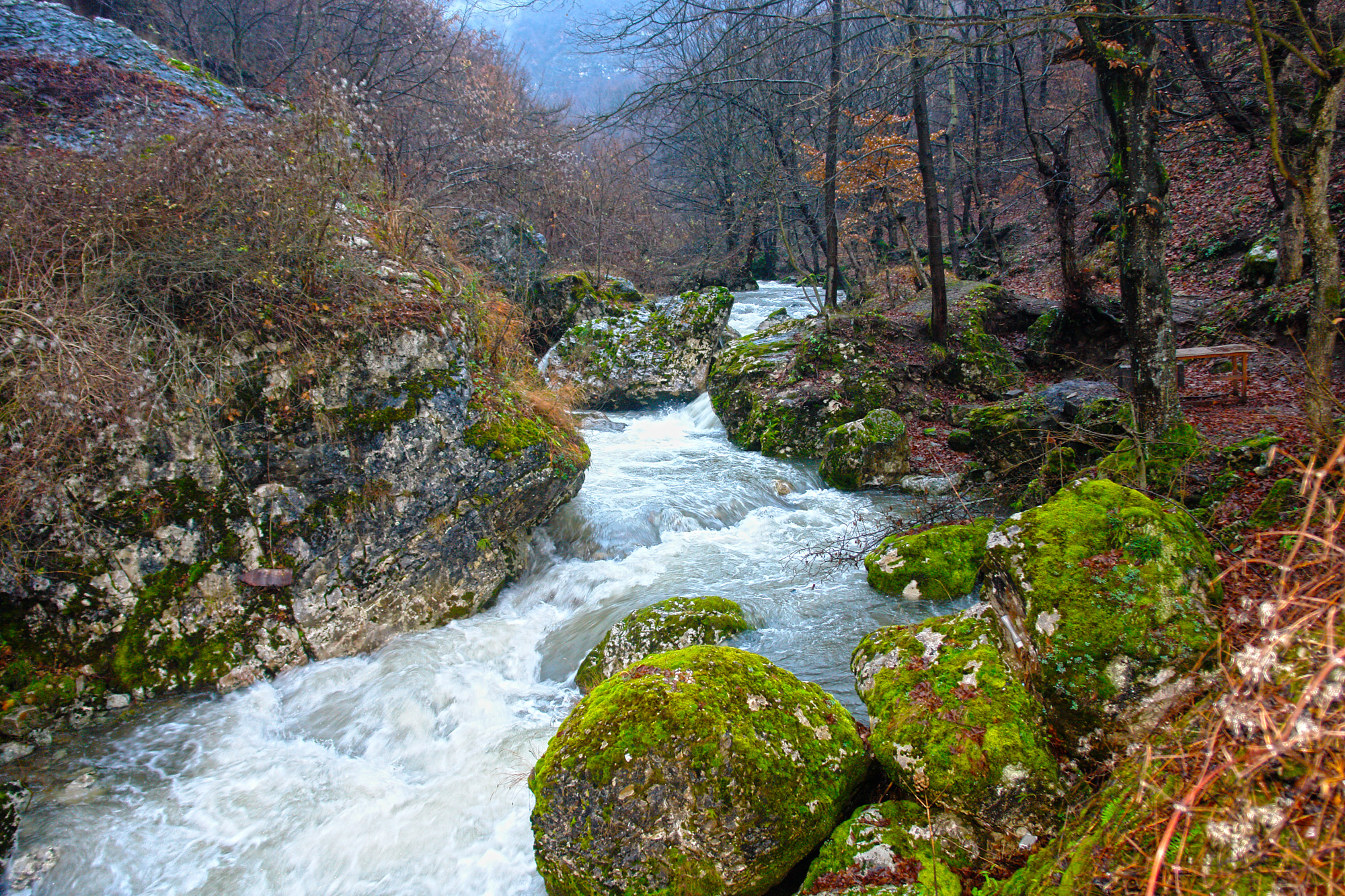
- Bukovica running through deep canyon beneath historic town of Bobovac

- Location within Bosnia and Herzegovina

Location
- Country: Bosnia and Herzegovina
- Municipality: Kakanj, Vareš

Physical characteristics
- Source: mountain springs and streams
  - location: Zvijezda mountain
  - coordinates: 44.19886976396866°N 18.329236566786513°E
  - elevation: cca.1,100 metres (3,600 ft)
- Mouth: Bosna
  - location: Kraljeva Sutjeska, near Kakanj
  - coordinates: 44.19885771654427°N 18.329240692549423°E
  - elevation: 380 metres (1,250 ft)
- Length: 20 kilometres (12 mi)
- Basin size: 161 square kilometres (62 mi^{2})

Basin features
- Progression: Bosna→ Sava→ Danube→ Black Sea
- River system: Bosna

The Bukovica, is a small river in Central Bosnia and Herzegovina. It springs deep in the hills under the mountain of Zvijezda, at about 1100 m above sea level. The length of the Bukovica River is about 20 km, and its catchment area is 161 square km. It flows through the historic town of Kraljeva Sutjeska on its way to the river Trstionica, where it spills into as its left tributary. The largest tributary of the river Borovački Potok, which running through a secluded forest regions of Zvijezda mountain. Bukovica passes by the medieval fortress-city of Bobovac, capital of medieval Bosnian state, and for several kilometres flows through deep and secluded canyon before spills into the Trstionica from the left in Kraljeva Sutjeska.

== See also ==
- Stupčanica
