= Capture of Olovo (1941) =

Battle during World War II

- Part of World War II in Yugoslavia
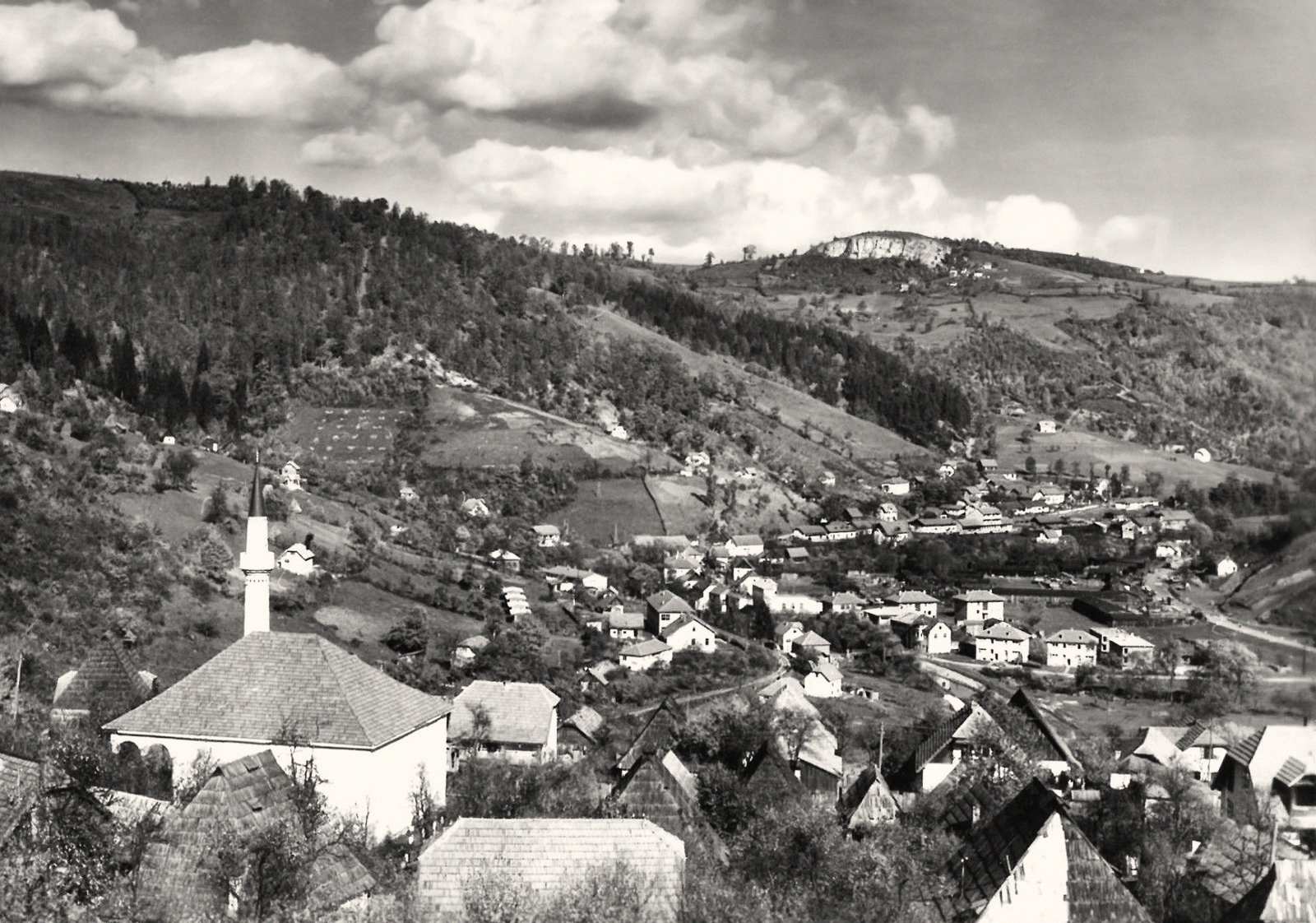
- Olovo in 1963
Date	1 November — 17 December 1941
Location	Olovo, Independent State of Croatia (present-day Bosnia and Herzegovina) 44.07°N 18.34°E
Result	Chetnik-Partisan victory: Chetniks and Partisans captured Olovo

Belligerents
Independent State of Croatia	Chetniks (Democratic Federal Yugoslavia) Yugoslav Partisans

Commanders and leaders
(Independent State of Croatia) Mihajlo Lukić; (Independent State of Croatia) Janko Sreharski; (Independent State of Croatia) Ante Marinković	Radovan Trivun

Units involved
(Independent State of Croatia) Croatian Home Guard - 2 companies: the 4th company of Sarajevo Reserve Battalion; the 17th company of the 6th Infantry Regiment; 180 Muslim militiamen; (Independent State of Croatia) 40 gendarmes; (Independent State of Croatia) a battery of mountain guns	4 Chetnik companies; (Democratic Federal Yugoslavia) parts of Partisan Romanija Detachment; Knežina company; Bjelogoračka company; Crepoljska company; (Democratic Federal Yugoslavia) parts of Partisan Zvijezda Detachment; Nišić battalion; Crnovrška company; Vlahinjska company

Strength
(Independent State of Croatia) 250 Croatian Home Guard members; 220 militiamen; 2 mountain guns; 2 machine guns	400 Chetniks; Battery of unknown guns; (Democratic Federal Yugoslavia) 800 Partisans

Casualties and losses
13 Croatian Home Guards and 26 militiamen killed; 9 Croatian Home Guards and 30 militiamen wounded; 21 Croatian Home Guards imprisoned; 17 Croatian Home Guards and 45 militiamen missing	At least 240 Chetniks according to Croatian sources
- Civilian victims of terror
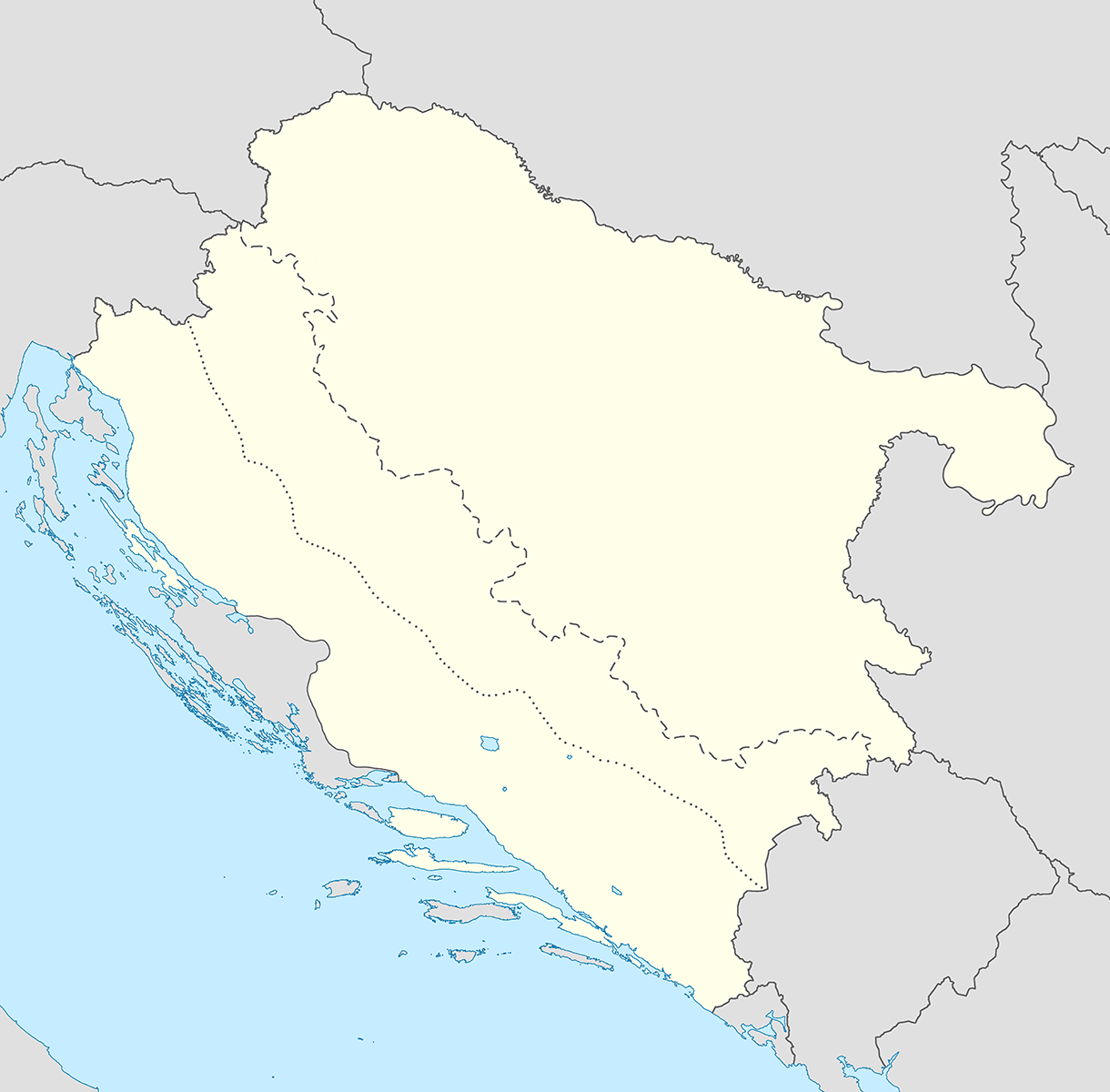
- Location of Olovo in the eastern NDH Olovo (Bosnia and Herzegovina)

The Capture of Olovo (1 November — 17 December 1941) was a battle fought between allied forces of Chetnik Detachments of the Yugoslav Army (Chetniks) and Yugoslav Partisans against Axis forces of the Independent State of Croatia garrisoned in Olovo in the first year of World War II in Yugoslavia.

== Background ==
On 21 September 1941 Chetniks attacked militia guards who protected a wooden bridge on the railway between Olovo and Kladanj. They killed one and imprisoned 9 militiamen, without damaging the bridge. On 29 September Chetniks burned wooden bridge between Olovo and Zavidovići.

On 28 October parts of Partisan Romanija Detachment in cooperation with Chetniks captured village Knežina after three days of fighting. Croatian Home Guard and Muslim militiamen fled Knežina and retreated to Olovo.

On 14 November 1941 Captain Sreharski Janko was appointed as commander of Olovo garrison. The 4th company of Sarajevo Reserve Battalion was commanded by Lieutenant Ante Marinković.

== Forces ==
Four Chetnik companies with 400 Chetniks and parts of Partisan Romanija Detachment (Knežina, Bjelogoračka and Crepoljska companies) and Zvijezda Detachment (Nišić battalion and Crnovrška and Vlahinjska company) with total of 800 Partisans organized an unsuccessful attack on Olovo on 1 November 1941.

The Axis forces in Olovo belonged to the III Domobran Corps commanded by Mihajlo Lukić. In mid-December 1941 the garrison in Olovo consisted of 2 companies of Croatian Home Guard, 180 militiamen, 40 gendarmes and a battery of mountain guns. The North-East positions around Olovo were defended by the 4th company of Sarajevo Reserve Battalion (166 members of Croatian Home Guards) enforced by 1 machine-gun. The South-East positions were held by the 17th company of the 6th Infantry Regiment (70 members of Croatian Home Guards, without one platoon). The West positions were defended by militia consisting of 130 and 40 militiamen. A battery of two mountain-guns operated from positions west of railway station in Olovo. One platoon of the 17th company of 6th Infantry Regiment was kept as reserve while flanks were protected by 50 militiamen in village Ponijerka.

== Offensive ==
=== Artillery preparation ===
According to some contemporary Croatian reports, in period 1–24 November 1941 about 240 Chetniks were killed during their attacks on Axis controlled Olovo. On 17 November in 7 a.m. insurgents attacked Olovo garrison. The attack started by Chetnik artillery which destroyed militia guard post killing and wounding 24 militiamen, while remaining 6 of them fled. The Chetnik artillery was then aimed against the most important position of Olovo garrison, so called "Stijena" which was defended by the 4th company of Sarajevo Reserve Battalion supported by one machine gun. The position of machine gun was quickly destroyed by Chetnik artillery. Another machine gun was sent as a replacement, but it was also quickly destroyed by Chetnik artillery.

=== Infantry assault and capture of Olovo ===
Around 10 a.m. the insurgents stopped their artillery fire and replaced it with barrages of rifle fire of the infantry insurgent units. The commander of the 4th company of Sarajevo Reserve Battalion, Ante Marinković was wounded during this attack and his company had to retreat from "Stijena" in 12:30. After being inforced by one reserve platoon this company managed to recapture "Stijena" for short time only to retreat after being attacked by more numerous Chetnik forces. When Chetniks permanently captured "Stijena" they burned straws as signal to other insurgents about their success. This boosted morale of the insurgents to attack more fiercely the positions of Olovo garrison that began retreating from their positions. To avoid capture of his forces, garrison commander Streharski retreat to the positions west of the village Solun. On 17 December 1941 Olovo was recaptured by Chetnik and Partisan rebel units.

On 18 December Streharski continued his retreat under fire until his forces reached Careva Ćuprija.

== Aftermath ==
At the end of 1941 joint Partisan-Chetnik administration still existed in many Eastern Bosnian towns, including Olovo.

The post-war Yugoslav sources emphasize that on 21 January 1942 part of German 750 regiment from 718 Infantry Division recaptured Olovo after the weak resistance of Chetniks. In 1943 Partisan 2nd Serbian brigade recaptured Olovo and burned its railway station and its wagons and equipment.

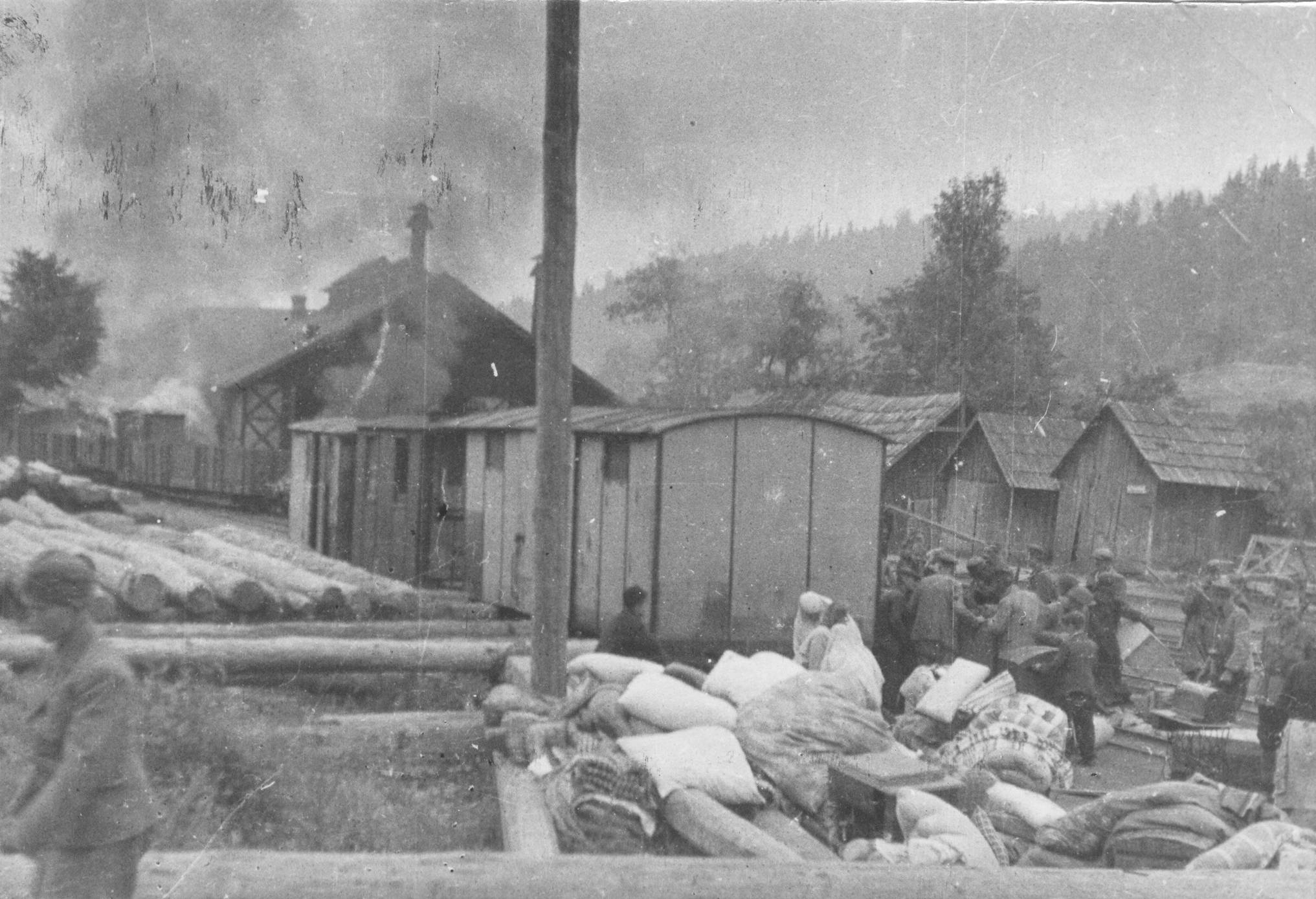
Partisans burned railway station in Olovo after they captured it in 1943

== Sources ==
- Christia, Fotini (12 November 2012). Alliance Formation in Civil Wars. Cambridge University Press. ISBN 978-1-107-02302-4.
- Institut (1953). Zbornik dokumenata i podataka o narodno-oslobodilačkom ratu jugoslovenskih naroda: knj. 1-35. Borbe u Bosni i Hercegovini 1941-1945, knjiga 2 - oktobar-decembar 1941. Vol. IV. Vojno-istoriski institut Jugoslovenske armije.
