= Bono Benić =

Bosnian historian

Bono Benić (1708 in Čatići near Kakanj – 27 March 1785 in Kraljeva Sutjeska) was a Franciscan from Bosnia, provincial of the Franciscan Province of Bosna Srebrena and a historian.

== Life and work ==
As a 10-year-old boy he entered into Franciscan monastery in Kraljeva Sutjeska, where he received elementary and high school education. In Cremona, Italy he graduated from college after studying theology and philosophy. His interests were in national and religious history of Catholics in Bosnia. His Protocollum conventus Suttiscae is considered to be most valuable and biggest yearbook of 18th century on the area of Bosnia and Herzegovina.

== Works ==
- Cum Auctor Epitome (1777)
- Yearbook of Sutjeska Monastery (1979 published)

== Sources ==
- Benić, Bono at enciklopedija.hr (in Croatian)
