= Kaljina (river) =

- Location within Bosnia and Herzegovina

Location
- Country: Bosnia and Herzegovina

Physical characteristics
- Source: Vrela
  - location: Ozren (Sokolac)
  - coordinates: 43°57′49″N 18°32′21″E
  - elevation: 1,115 m (3,658 ft)
- Mouth
  - location: Bioštica
  - coordinates: 44°03′29″N 18°38′24″E
  - elevation: 685 m (2,247 ft)
- Length: 26 km (16 mi)
- Basin size

Basin features
- Progression: Bioštica→ Krivaja→ Bosna→ Sava→ Danube→ Black Sea

The Kaljina is a river in the central-northeastern part of Bosnia and Herzegovina, municipality of Sokolac. The source of the river is on Ozren Sarajevski, in the area of "Vrela" near Ozren village, while the majority of its course runs across Nišići karst plateau, where the river passes through a village with a same name, Kaljina, which is the largest settlement on its course. After about 26 kilometers of scenic flow from source to confluence, through the pristine nature of the plateau, the Kaljina meets Bioštica near the town of Olovo. The Krivaja basin is known for an abundant fish fauna, rich in species, some of which are critically endangered, such as Danube Salmon (or Danube Taimen) (Hucho hucho). All the Krivaja tributaries and especially its headwaters are important spawning grounds for both Danube Taimen and its prey, Common nase (Chondrostoma nasus) and Grayling (Thymallus thymallus). The Kaljina, its parent the Bioštica, and the Stupčanica are the main source of the Krivaja waters, and all three are unspoiled in sense of water quality, their hydromorphology, natural surroundings and river biodiversity. The rich pool of indigenous salmonids such as Danube brown trout (Salo truta fario, Danube lineage), spawning grounds for huchen and nase, can only be maintained through statutory protection, and preservation of the Krivaja basin streams and rivers uninterrupted flow from construction of dams. However plans for hydropower development exist, and represent a real risk for unspoiled natural environment of the region.
