= Trstionica (river) =

River in Bosnia and Herzegovina

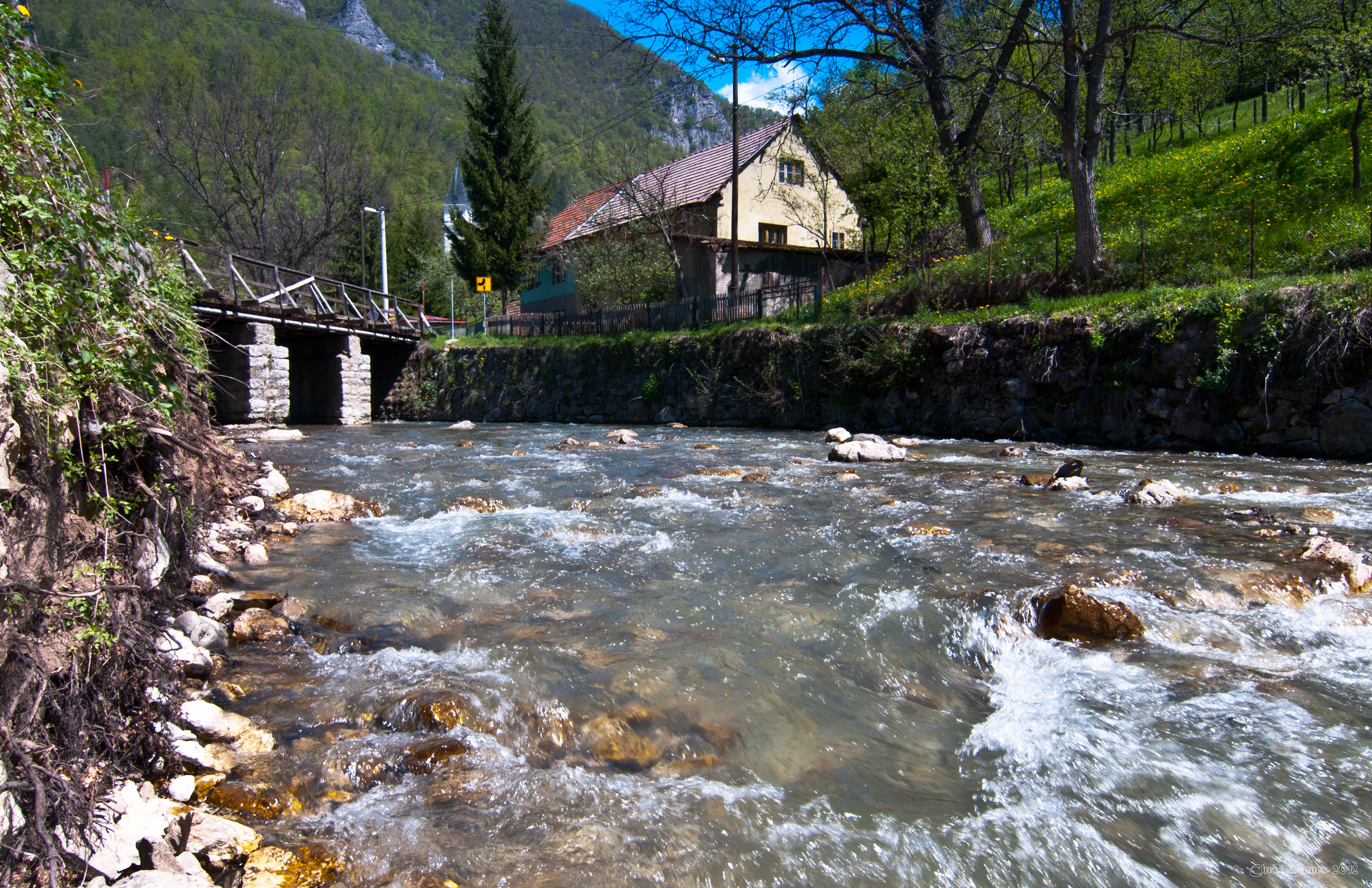
- Trstionica running through Kraljeva Sutjeska, historic town

- Location within Bosnia and Herzegovina

Location
- Country: Bosnia and Herzegovina
- Municipality: Kakanj, Olovo

Physical characteristics
- Source: mountain springs and streams
  - location: Zvijezda mountain
  - coordinates: 44.2553°N 18.2283°E
  - elevation: cca.1,100 metres (3,600 ft)
- Mouth: Bosna
  - location: Čatići, near Kakanj
  - coordinates: 44.09494°N 18.11332°E
  - elevation: 380 metres (1,250 ft)
- Length: 35 kilometres (22 mi)
- Basin size: 161 square kilometres (62 mi^{2})

Basin features
- Progression: Bosna→ Sava→ Danube→ Black Sea
- River system: Bosna

The Trstionica, (also known under its historic name Trstivnica) is a small river in Central Bosnia and Herzegovina. It springs deep in the hills under the mountain of Zvijezda, at about 1100 m above sea level. The length of the Trstionica River is about 35 km, and its catchment area is 161 square km. It flows through the historic town of Kraljeva Sutjeska on its way to the river Bosna, where it spills into as its right tributary near the industrial town of Kakanj. The largest tributary of the river Trstionica is the Bukovica river, which running through a deep and secluded canyon passes by the medieval fortress-city of Bobovac, capital of medieval Bosnian state, and after several kilometres flows into the Trstionica from the left in Kraljeva Sutjeska.

== See also ==
- Krivaja
