= Žunova =

Village in Olovo, Bosnia and Herzegovina

- Village
- Location within Bosnia and Herzegovina
- Coordinates: 44.1734°N 18.5505°E
- Country: Bosnia and Herzegovina
- Entity: Federation of Bosnia and Herzegovina
- Canton: Zenica-Doboj
- Municipality: Olovo

Area
  - Total: 1.37 sq mi (3.56 km^{2})

Population (2013)
  - Total: 168
  - Density: 122/sq mi (47.2/km^{2})
- Time zone: UTC+1 (CET)
  - Summer (DST): UTC+2 (CEST)

Žunova is a village in the municipality of Olovo, Bosnia and Herzegovina.

== Demographics ==
According to the 2013 census, its population was 168.

Ethnicity in 2013
Ethnicity	Number	Percentage
Bosniaks	167	99.4%
other/undeclared	1	0.6%
Total	168	100%
