= Trstionica =

Trstionica may refer to:

- Trstionica, a medieval village near Kraljeva Sutjeska, Bosnia and Herzegovina, the location of the Royal court in Sutjeska
- Trstionica (river), a river in Bosnia and Herzegovina
