= Stojčići, Olovo =

Village in Olovo, Bosnia and Herzegovina

Stojčići
- Village
- Location within Bosnia and Herzegovina
- Coordinates: 44.2798826°N 18.3984514°E
- Country: Bosnia and Herzegovina
- Entity: Federation of Bosnia and Herzegovina
- Canton: Zenica-Doboj
- Municipality: Olovo

Area
  - Total: 4.23 sq mi (10.96 km^{2})

Population (2013)
  - Total: 182
  - Density: 43.0/sq mi (16.6/km^{2})
- Time zone: UTC+1 (CET)
  - Summer (DST): UTC+2 (CEST)

Stojčići is a village in the municipality of Olovo, Bosnia and Herzegovina.

== Demographics ==
According to the 2013 census, its population was 182.

Ethnicity in 2013
| Ethnicity | Number | Percentage |
|---|---|---|
| Croats | 139 | 76.4% |
| Bosniaks | 42 | 23.1% |
| other/undeclared | 1 | 0.5% |
| Total | 182 | 100% |
