= Krajišići =

Village in Olovo, Bosnia and Herzegovina

- Village
- Location within Bosnia and Herzegovina
- Coordinates: 44.0789213°N 18.6315679°E
- Country: Bosnia and Herzegovina
- Entity: Republika Srpska; Federation of Bosnia and Herzegovina
- Region Canton: Sarajevo; Zenica-Doboj
- Municipality: Sokolac; Olovo

Area
  - Total: 1.94 sq mi (5.03 km^{2})

Population (2013)
  - Total: 7
  - Density: 3.6/sq mi (1.4/km^{2})
- Time zone: UTC+1 (CET)
  - Summer (DST): UTC+2 (CEST)

Krajišići is a village in the municipalities of Sokolac (Republika Srpska) and Olovo, Bosnia and Herzegovina.

== Demographics ==
According to the 2013 census, its population was 7, all Serbs with 5 living in the Olovo part and 2 living in the Sokolac part.
