= Čude Canyon =

Canyon of the Stupčanica river, Bosnia and Herzegovina

- Krševi
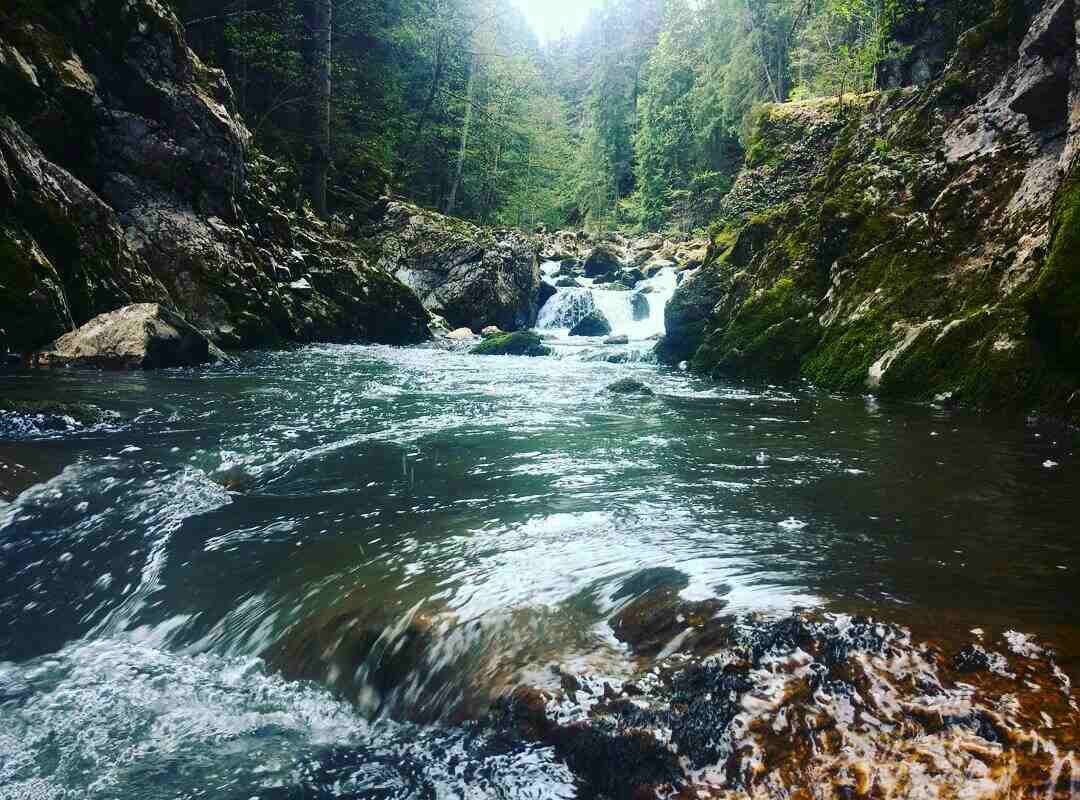
- The Stupćanica river running through Čude Canyon

- Location within Bosnia and Herzegovina
- Length: 3.8 kilometres (2.4 mi) East-West
- Width: canyon floor 2 metres (6.6 ft)
- Depth: 600 metres (2,000 ft)

Geology
- Type: Karst

Geography
- Location: Petrovići village to Bijeliš village, Bosnia and Herzegovina
- Coordinates: 44.142032°N 18.676612°E 44.141800°N 18.643718°E
- Rivers: Stupčanica

Location
- Interactive map of Čude Canyon

The Čude Canyon is a canyon created by the Stupčanica river on its course between Petrovići and downstream Bijeliš village near Olovo, in central-northeastern part of Bosnia and Herzegovina.

== Location ==
The name Čude is shared by the canyon, locality, and the village Čude, located midway through the canyon on a right bank, nested in a small widening where the slope slightly bends and curves.

== Description ==
The Stupčanica cuts through the steep slopes of Gradac on the right bank, and Krševi on the left. It creates a canyon only 3.8 kilometers long, but over a half of a kilometer deep (cca. 600 meters), and in places just a few hundreds meters wide at the rim levels, while at the river level it is often only 2–3 meters wide.

=== Sections ===
The Čude Canyon consist of three differently named narrowings, with a length of about 1,000 to 1,500 meters each. The first, the Stijena Canyon, plunges vertically into the Stupčanica River. The main section, located 1.5 km from the first, is called Čude-Klam. A slope on the left bank of this approximately 350 meters long section, called Srihin Canyon, is almost completely bare and over 300 meters high limestone rock which is fully vertical. About three hundred meters further away is the Veliki Srihin Canyon, which is around 400 meters long and over 300 meters high. There are almost no growth on its sides, except some sparse patches of grass and few shrubs. In the rocks of this section, there is an entrance to a cave that can only be reached with the use of special equipment.

The Čude Canyon is protected natural monument of Bosnia and Herzegovina.

== See also ==
- Prača Canyon
- Rakitnica Canyon
- Drežnica Valley

== Bibliography ==
- Ržehak, Viktor (1958). "Manje poznate prirodne rijetkosti u Bosni i Hercegovini i potreba njihove zaštite" [Lesser known natural rarities in Bosnia and Herzegovina and the need for their protection] (pdf). Yearbook Naše starine (in Serbo-Croatian). V. Sarajevo: Zavod za zaštitu spomenika kulture SR Bosne i Hercegovine: 105–124.
