= Vukotići =

Village in Olovo, Bosnia and Herzegovina

- Village
- Location within Bosnia and Herzegovina
- Coordinates: 44.2073136°N 18.5133073°E
- Country: Bosnia and Herzegovina
- Entity: Federation of Bosnia and Herzegovina
- Canton: Zenica-Doboj
- Municipality: Olovo

Area
  - Total: 3.39 sq mi (8.79 km^{2})

Population (2013)
  - Total: 251
  - Density: 74.0/sq mi (28.6/km^{2})
- Time zone: UTC+1 (CET)
  - Summer (DST): UTC+2 (CEST)

Vukotići is a village in the municipality of Olovo, Bosnia and Herzegovina.

== Demographics ==
According to the 2013 census, its population was 251.

Ethnicity in 2013
Ethnicity	Number	Percentage
Bosniaks	248	98.8%
other/undeclared	3	1.2%
Total	251	100%
