= Klinčići =

Village in Olovo, Bosnia and Herzegovina

- Village
- Location within Bosnia and Herzegovina
- Coordinates: 44.1238516°N 18.5183629°E
- Country: Bosnia and Herzegovina
- Entity: Federation of Bosnia and Herzegovina
- Canton: Zenica-Doboj
- Municipality: Olovo

Area
  - Total: 7.39 sq mi (19.15 km^{2})

Population (2013)
  - Total: 434
  - Density: 58.7/sq mi (22.7/km^{2})
- Time zone: UTC+1 (CET)
  - Summer (DST): UTC+2 (CEST)

Klinčići is a village in the municipality of Olovo, Bosnia and Herzegovina.

== Demographics ==
According to the 2013 census, its population was 434.

Ethnicity in 2013
Ethnicity	Number	Percentage
Bosniaks	426	98.2%
other/undeclared	8	1.8%
Total	434	100%
