= Krivaja, Zavidovići =

Krivaja Криваја
- Village
- Location within Bosnia and Herzegovina
- Coordinates: 44.441423°N 18.238908°E
- Country: Bosnia and Herzegovina
- Entity: Federation of Bosnia and Herzegovina
- Canton: Zenica-Doboj
- Municipality: Zavidovići

Area
  - Total: 2.50 sq mi (6.47 km^{2})

Population (2013)
  - Total: 1,227
  - Density: 491/sq mi (190/km^{2})
- Time zone: UTC+1 (CET)
  - Summer (DST): UTC+2 (CEST)

Krivaja is a village in the municipality of Zavidovići, Bosnia and Herzegovina. It is located south of the Krivaja River.

== Demographics ==
According to the 2013 census, its population was 1,227.

Ethnicity in 2013
Ethnicity	Number	Percentage
Bosniaks	1,220	99.7%
other/undeclared	7	0.3%
Total	1,227	100%
