= Arapovača =

Village in Olovo, Bosnia and Herzegovina

- Village
- Location within Bosnia and Herzegovina
- Coordinates: 44.1064°N 18.6170°E
- Country: Bosnia and Herzegovina
- Entity: Federation of Bosnia and Herzegovina
- Canton: Zenica-Doboj
- Municipality: Olovo

Area
  - Total: 1.68 sq mi (4.36 km^{2})

Population (2013)
  - Total: 18
  - Density: 11/sq mi (4.1/km^{2})
- Time zone: UTC+1 (CET)
  - Summer (DST): UTC+2 (CEST)

Arapovača is a village in the municipality of Olovo, Bosnia and Herzegovina.

== Demographics ==
According to the 2013 census, its population was 18.

Ethnicity in 2013
Ethnicity	Number	Percentage
Bosniaks	9	50.0%
Serbs	9	50.0%
Total	18	100%
