= Magulica =

Village in Olovo, Bosnia and Herzegovina

- Village
- Location within Bosnia and Herzegovina
- Coordinates: 44.2403193°N 18.4557268°E
- Country: Bosnia and Herzegovina
- Entity: Federation of Bosnia and Herzegovina
- Canton: Zenica-Doboj
- Municipality: Olovo

Area
  - Total: 4.64 sq mi (12.03 km^{2})

Population (2013)
  - Total: 42
  - Density: 9.0/sq mi (3.5/km^{2})
- Time zone: UTC+1 (CET)
  - Summer (DST): UTC+2 (CEST)

Magulica is a village in the municipality of Olovo, Bosnia and Herzegovina.

== Demographics ==
According to the 2013 census, its population was 42, all Croats.
