= Solun =

Solun may refer to:

- Thessaloniki, a Greek city known as Solun or Soluň in several languages
- Solun, Horqin Right Front Banner, a town in Inner Mongolia, China
- Solun, Olovo, a village in Bosnia and Herzegovina
- Solun or Solon people, a subgroup of the Evenki people of Northeastern China
- Solun Glacier, Antarctica
- Solun-Voden dialect, a South Slavic dialect

== See also ==
- Solon (disambiguation)
- Soluna (disambiguation)
