= Pušino Polje =

Village in Olovo, Bosnia and Herzegovina

- Village
- Location within Bosnia and Herzegovina
- Coordinates: 44.108294°N 18.6402547°E
- Country: Bosnia and Herzegovina
- Entity: Federation of Bosnia and Herzegovina
- Canton: Zenica-Doboj
- Municipality: Olovo

Area
  - Total: 0.40 sq mi (1.03 km^{2})

Population (2013)
  - Total: 64
  - Density: 160/sq mi (62/km^{2})
- Time zone: UTC+1 (CET)
  - Summer (DST): UTC+2 (CEST)

Pušino Polje is a village in the municipality of Olovo, Bosnia and Herzegovina.

== Demographics ==
According to the 2013 census, its population was 64.

Ethnicity in 2013
Ethnicity	Number	Percentage
Bosniaks	63	98.4%
other/undeclared	1	1.6%
Total	64	100%
