= Olovske Luke =

Village in Olovo, Bosnia and Herzegovina

- Village
- Location within Bosnia and Herzegovina
- Coordinates: 44.130967°N 18.609805°E
- Country: Bosnia and Herzegovina
- Entity: Federation of Bosnia and Herzegovina
- Canton: Zenica-Doboj
- Municipality: Olovo

Area
  - Total: 2.15 sq mi (5.58 km^{2})

Population (2013)
  - Total: 554
  - Density: 257/sq mi (99.3/km^{2})
- Time zone: UTC+1 (CET)
  - Summer (DST): UTC+2 (CEST)

Olovske Luke is a village in the municipality of Olovo, Bosnia and Herzegovina.

== Demographics ==
According to the 2013 census, its population was 554.

Ethnicity in 2013
Ethnicity	Number	Percentage
Bosniaks	540	97.5%
Serbs	10	1.8%
other/undeclared	4	0.7%
Total	554	100%
