= Križevići =

Village in Olovo, Bosnia and Herzegovina

- Village
- Location within Bosnia and Herzegovina
- Coordinates: 44.1475315°N 18.5379441°E
- Country: Bosnia and Herzegovina
- Entity: Federation of Bosnia and Herzegovina
- Canton: Zenica-Doboj
- Municipality: Olovo

Area
  - Total: 1.32 sq mi (3.42 km^{2})

Population (2013)
  - Total: 176
  - Density: 133/sq mi (51.5/km^{2})
- Time zone: UTC+1 (CET)
  - Summer (DST): UTC+2 (CEST)

Križevići is a village in the municipality of Olovo, Bosnia and Herzegovina.

== Demographics ==
According to the 2013 census, its population was 176.

Ethnicity in 2013
Ethnicity	Number	Percentage
Bosniaks	166	94.3%
Serbs	5	2.8%
Croats	2	1.1%
other/undeclared	3	1.7%
Total	176	100%
