= Slivnje =

Village in Olovo, Bosnia and Herzegovina

- Village
- Location within Bosnia and Herzegovina
- Coordinates: 44.1613127°N 18.7294706°E
- Country: Bosnia and Herzegovina
- Entity: Federation of Bosnia and Herzegovina
- Canton: Zenica-Doboj
- Municipality: Olovo

Area
  - Total: 4.66 sq mi (12.06 km^{2})

Population (2013)
  - Total: 6
  - Density: 1.3/sq mi (0.50/km^{2})
- Time zone: UTC+1 (CET)
  - Summer (DST): UTC+2 (CEST)

Slivnje is a village in the municipality of Olovo, Bosnia and Herzegovina.

== Demographics ==
According to the 2013 census, its population was 6.

Ethnicity in 2013
| Ethnicity | Number | Percentage |
|---|---|---|
| Bosniaks | 5 | 83.3% |
| other/undeclared | 1 | 16.7% |
| Total | 6 | 100% |
