= Kamensko, Bosnia and Herzegovina =

Village in Olovo, Bosnia and Herzegovina

Kamensko
- Village
- Location within Bosnia and Herzegovina
- Coordinates: 44.2513404°N 18.4371291°E
- Country: Bosnia and Herzegovina
- Entity: Federation of Bosnia and Herzegovina
- Canton: Zenica-Doboj
- Municipality: Olovo

Area
  - Total: 27.64 sq mi (71.59 km^{2})

Population (2013)
  - Total: 634
  - Density: 22.9/sq mi (8.86/km^{2})
- Time zone: UTC+1 (CET)
  - Summer (DST): UTC+2 (CEST)

Kamensko is a village in the municipality of Olovo, Bosnia and Herzegovina.

== Demographics ==
According to the 2013 census, its population was 634.

Ethnicity in 2013
| Ethnicity | Number | Percentage |
|---|---|---|
| Bosniaks | 626 | 98.7% |
| Croats | 6 | 0.9% |
| other/undeclared | 2 | 0.3% |
| Total | 634 | 100% |
