= Lišci =

Village in Olovo, Bosnia and Herzegovina

- Village
- Location within Bosnia and Herzegovina
- Coordinates: 44.122136°N 18.6574987°E
- Country: Bosnia and Herzegovina
- Entity: Federation of Bosnia and Herzegovina
- Canton: Zenica-Doboj
- Municipality: Olovo

Area
  - Total: 1.06 sq mi (2.74 km^{2})

Population (2013)
  - Total: 147
  - Density: 139/sq mi (53.6/km^{2})
- Time zone: UTC+1 (CET)
  - Summer (DST): UTC+2 (CEST)

Lišci is a village in the municipality of Olovo, Bosnia and Herzegovina.

== Demographics ==
According to the 2013 census, its population was 147.

Ethnicity in 2013
Ethnicity	Number	Percentage
Bosniaks	143	97.3%
other/undeclared	4	2.7%
Total	147	100%
