= Krivaja (Bosna) =

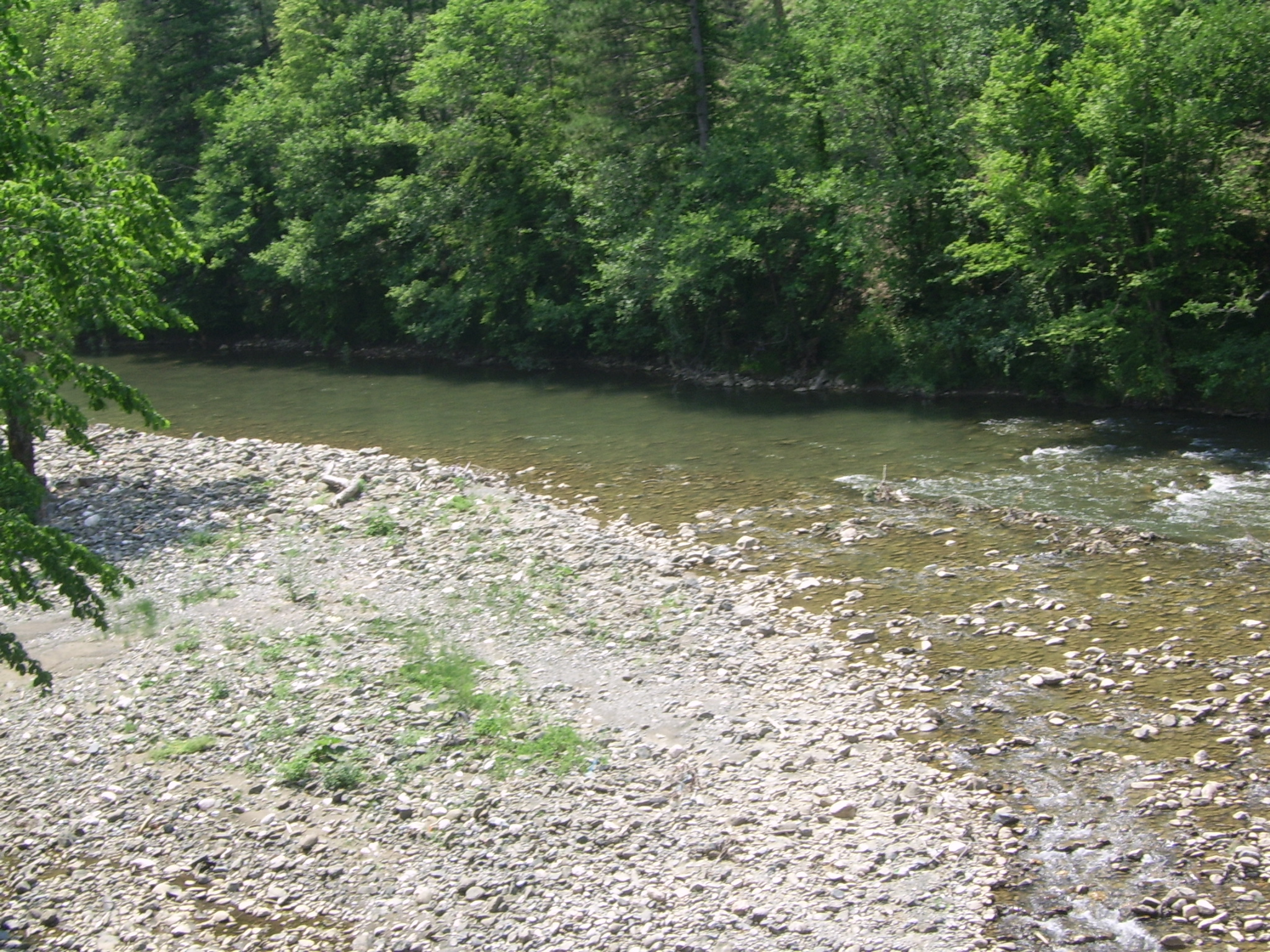
- The middle course, at the village of Careva Ćuprija, between Olovo and Zavidovići

Location
- Country: Bosnia and Herzegovina

Physical characteristics
- Source: Stupčanica & Bioštica confluence
  - location: Olovo Zavidovići
  - coordinates: 44°07′33″N 18°34′36″E
  - elevation: 530 m (1,740 ft)
- Mouth
  - location: Bosna
  - coordinates: 44°26′40″N 18°09′17″E
- Length: 73.5 km (45.7 mi)
- Basin size: 1,494.5 km^{2} (577.0 sq mi)

Basin features
- Progression: Bosna→ Sava→ Danube→ Black Sea

The Krivaja (Serbian Cyrillic: Криваја) is a river in central-northern parts of Bosnia and Herzegovina, and a right tributary of the Bosna river. It is known for its pristine waters and natural environment of the surrounding areas, including rich biodiversity.

== Hydrography ==
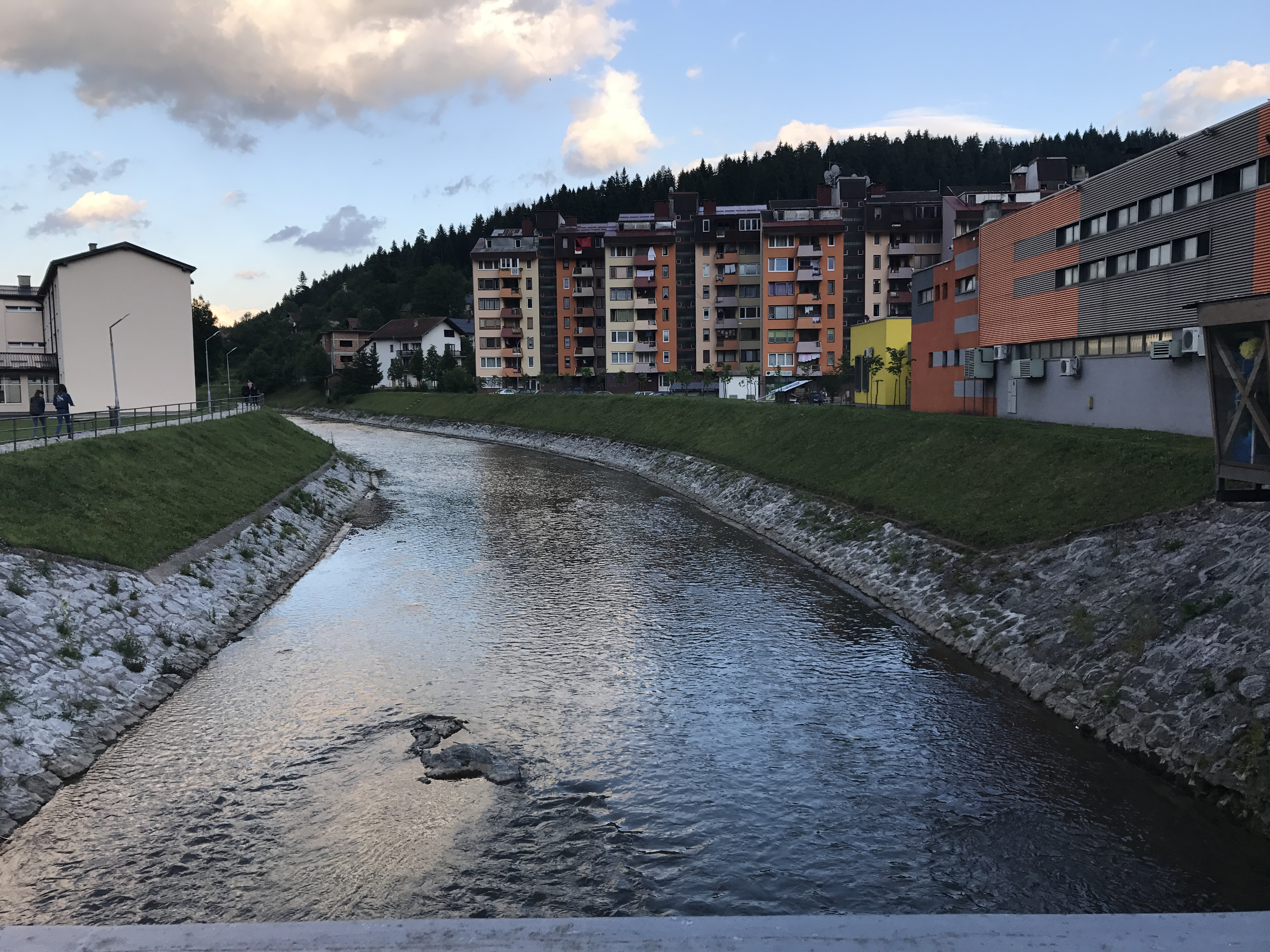
Stupčanica just before the confluence with Bioštica in Olovo.

Its source is confluence of the Stupčanica and the Bioštica rivers at the western outskirts of small mountainous town of Olovo. The Kaljina, its parent the Bioštica as the Krivaja's left source, and the Stupčanica as the right, are the main source of the Krivaja waters, and all are unspoiled in terms of water quality, their hydromorphology, natural surrounding and river biodiversity.

From their confluence in Olovo, the Krivaja flows in north-western direction through the scenic gorges and valleys between mountains of Zvijezda and Konjuh (mountain), with lot of mountain streams and small rivers inflow from both sides. Finally, after 74 kilometers, the Krivaja meets the Bosna river in the vicinity of town of Zavidovići.

=== Tributaries ===
Beside the source rivers, Stupčanica and Bioštica, ichluding main Bioštica's tributary, Kaljina, the Krivaja's tributaries are numerous smaller mountain streams, such as Očevlja with Orlja, Kamenica, Tribija, Duboštica, Župeljeva with Velika Maoča, Mala Maoča, Ribnica, Vezučica, Kamenica.

== Tourism and heritage ==
Today, Krivaja valley is best known for its coniferous forests, hunting grounds on surrounding mountains Zvijezda and Konjuh, and clear swift waters coming from three main mountain rivers, the Stupčanica and Bioštica, and numerous smaller tributary mountain streams. Olovo hosts annual bullwrestling in nearby villages Čevljanovići and Boganovići, and other traditional festivals.

The region is also known for its hunting grounds in surrounding forests, while several protected nature parks are established around nearby mountains and canyons, such as protected areas on Konjuh and Zvijezda, Čude Canyon, Bioštica river canyon, with many culture-historical heritage site from times of medieval Bosnia.

Olovo is also a stopover for travelers to rest and change directions when traveling to cities such as Sarajevo to Tuzla, or Zenica and Zavidovići.

=== Hot springs and spa ===
It is a popular nightlife spot for youth from nearby villages. Olovo is also well known for its spa built around mineral rich hot springs, which dates back to the period of Roman reign in the area. There are also several hot springs along the course of the Krivaja river, downstream from Olovo. These hot springs are well known though only provisionally captured with a tub made of roughly cut block of stones dating back to Roman times.

=== Fishing and rafting course ===
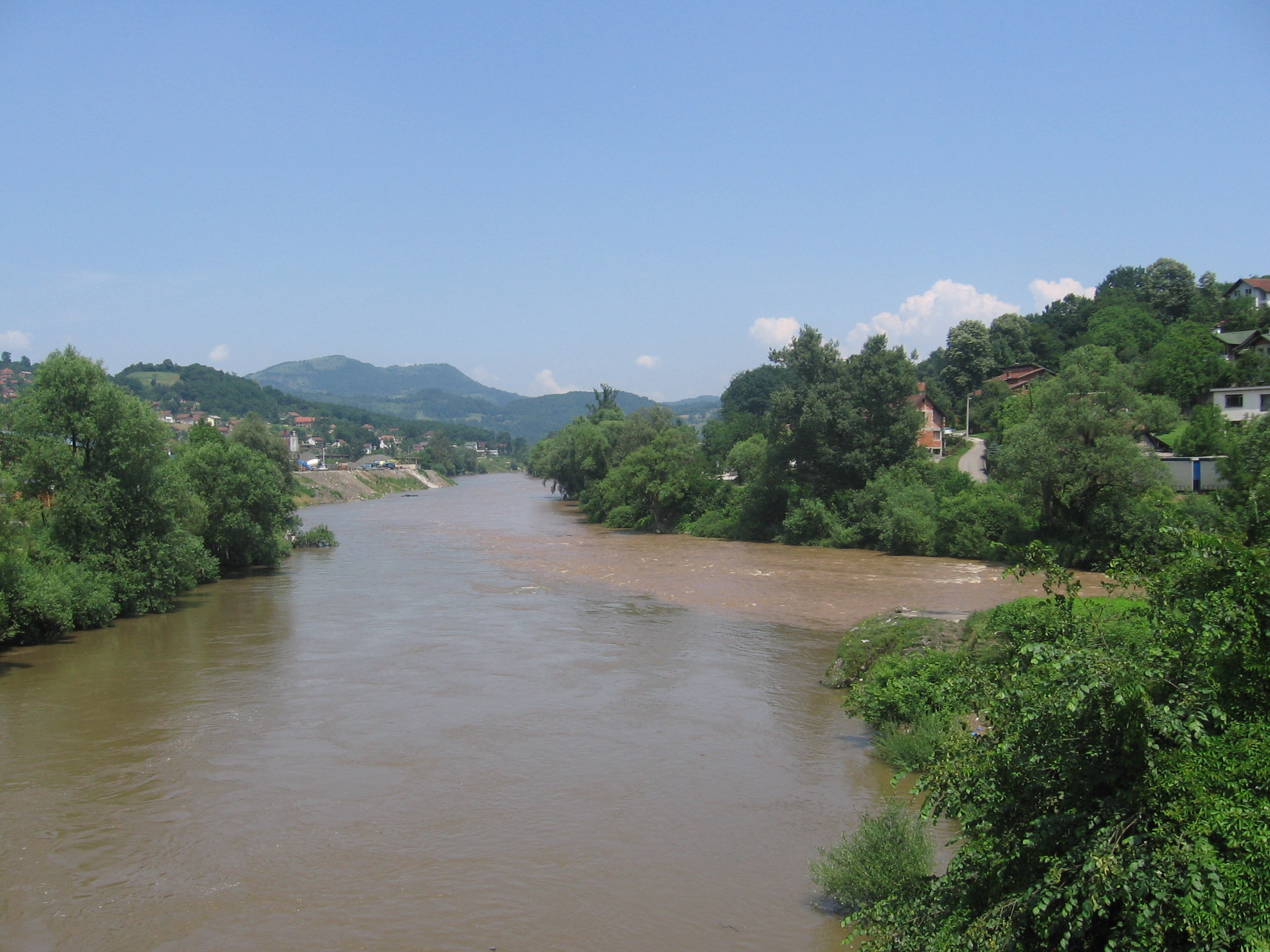
Krivaja spills into Bosna from the right.

The river is well known for rafting, canoeing and freshwater fishing. The Krivaja basin is known for an abundant ichthyo-fauna, rich in species, some of which are critically endangered, such as hucho (also known as Danube Salmon or Danube Taimen) (Lat. Hucho hucho). All the Krivaja tributaries and especially its headwaters are important spawning grounds for both Danube Taimen and its prey, Common nase (Chondrostoma nasus) and Grayling (Thymallus thymallus).

Rich pool of indigenous salmonids such as Danube brown trout (Salo truta fario, Danube lineage), spawning grounds for hucho and nase, can only be maintained through statutory protection, and preservation of the Krivaja basin streams and rivers uninterrupted flows from construction of dams. However, plans for hydropower development exist, and represent real risk for the unspoiled natural environment of the region.
