= Soluna (disambiguation) =

Soluna was a music group (1998–2004) consisting of four members, all of Hispanic descent.

Soluna may also refer to:

- Soluna Samay (born 1990), Guatemalan-Danish singer
- Toyota Tercel, a car, also known as Toyota Soluna

== See also ==
- Luna (disambiguation)
- Sol (disambiguation)
- Solun (disambiguation)
