= Čuništa =

Village in Olovo, Bosnia and Herzegovina

- Village
- Location within Bosnia and Herzegovina
- Coordinates: 44.2036584°N 18.4945007°E
- Country: Bosnia and Herzegovina
- Entity: Federation of Bosnia and Herzegovina
- Canton: Zenica-Doboj
- Municipality: Olovo

Area
  - Total: 4.90 sq mi (12.70 km^{2})

Population (2013)
  - Total: 888
  - Density: 181/sq mi (69.9/km^{2})
- Time zone: UTC+1 (CET)
  - Summer (DST): UTC+2 (CEST)

Čuništa is a village in the municipality of Olovo, Bosnia and Herzegovina.

== Demographics ==
According to the 2013 census, its population was 463.

Ethnicity in 2013
Ethnicity	Number	Percentage
Bosniaks	459	99.1%
other/undeclared	4	0.9%
Total	463	100%
