= Zvijezda (Bosnia and Herzegovina) =

Mountain in central Bosnia and Herzegovina

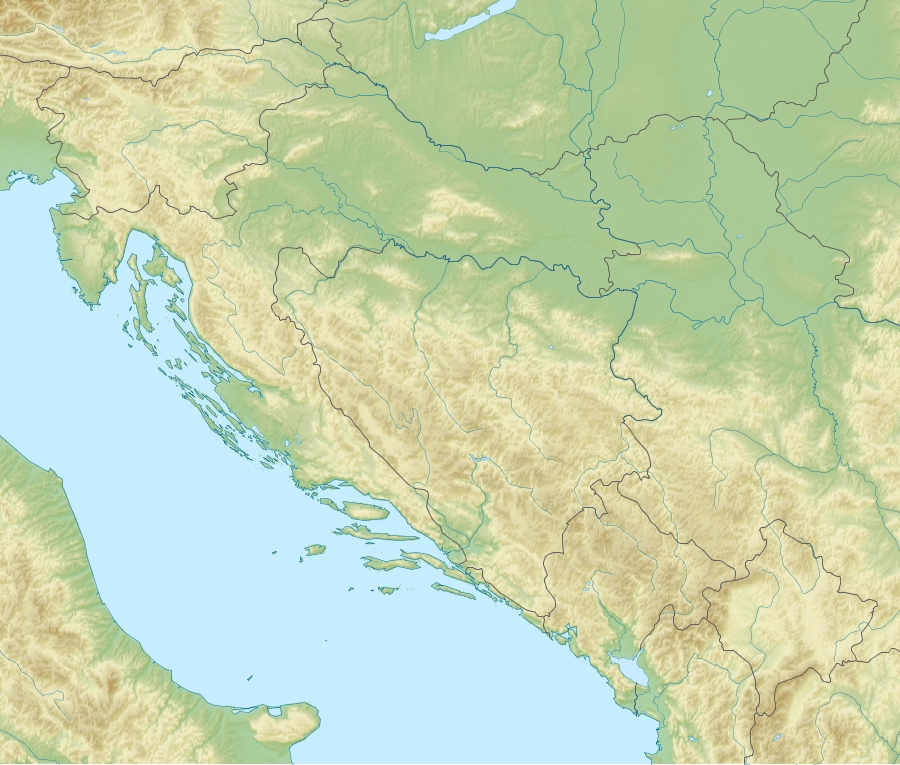
- Location within Bosnia and Herzegovina Location within Dinaric Alps

Highest point
- Elevation: 1,349 m (4,426 ft)
- Coordinates: 44°09′16″N 18°23′48″E

Geography
- Location: Bosnia and Herzegovina
- Parent range: Dinaric Alps

Zvijezda (Serbo-Croatian Cyrillic: Звијезда) is a mountain in central Bosnia and Herzegovina, between towns of Breza, Vareš, Kakanj and Olovo, and between the rivers Bosna, Krivaja and Ljubina. It has several peaks higher than 1,300 metres (4,300 ft) above sea level, the highest of which is eponymous Krš at 1,349 metres (4,426 ft). It is composed mostly of limestone, and covered with lush forests, predominantly coniferous.

== Hydrography ==
Beneath the mountain lies a rich aquifer, which makes a source of fresh clean waters for the mountain's numerous streams and rivers, flowing toward Bosna on the southern and western side of the mountain, and the Krivaja on the northern and eastern side. Most important rivers belonging to the Bosna watershed are the Stavnja, Misoča, Zgošća, Goruša, Lužnica, Trstionica with its tributary Bukovica, Ribnica, Pepelarska rijeka, Gostović with the tributary streams Trbušnica, Otežna, Buretina, Suha, while the most significant rivers and streams belonging to the Krivaja river watershed are Gnjionica, Tribija with Vijačica and Kruškovica, Očevlja with Orlja, Vojnica, Vozućica, Duboštica, Gosovica, Dištica, Džinića rijeka, Lipovac.

== Heritage, ecology and tourism ==
The main settlement, situated in the river Stavnja valley, is old mining town of Vareš. Zvijezda mountain is rich in ores, such as iron, zinc, manganese, lead and coal, and is historically known to be place of mining and ore exploitation, while in the villages and towns located around the mountain the processing of these metals and the production of tools and weapons has always been a traditional activity and the center of production in Bosnia and Herzegovina since the Middle Ages. Some remnants of these trades and old craft skills among blacksmith are still present today.

The peat bog named Đilda is located on the mountain, with a refugium of endemic and medicinal plant mustard. The tourist resort Doli is established, where guests can use bungalows and are served homemade dishes.

The main road between Tuzla and Sarajevo runs in the southeastern foothills of Zvijezda. Also, several sport clubs from neighbouring towns bears its name.

== See also ==
- Bobovac
- Kraljeva Sutjeska

== Bibliography ==
- Guber, Mihovil (1943). "Pustošenje planinarskih objekata u južnoj Hrvatskoj" [The Desolation of Mountain Objects in Southern Croatia] (PDF). Hrvatski planinar (in Croatian). Vol. 39, no. 6–7. pp. 85–93. ISSN 0354-0650.
