= Dugandžići =

Village in Olovo, Bosnia and Herzegovina

- Village
- Location within Bosnia and Herzegovina
- Coordinates: 44.0962459°N 18.6510515°E
- Country: Bosnia and Herzegovina
- Entity: Republika Srpska; Federation of Bosnia and Herzegovina
- Region Canton: Sarajevo; Zenica-Doboj
- Municipality: Sokolac; Olovo

Area
  - Total: 1.86 sq mi (4.81 km^{2})

Population (2013)
  - Total: 24
  - Density: 13/sq mi (5.0/km^{2})
- Time zone: UTC+1 (CET)
  - Summer (DST): UTC+2 (CEST)

Dugandžići is a village in the municipality of Olovo, Bosnia and Herzegovina.

== Demographics ==
According to the 2013 census, its population was 24, with 23 living in the Olovo part and just 1 in the Sokolac part.

Ethnicity in 2013
| Ethnicity | Number | Percentage |
|---|---|---|
| Bosniaks | 14 | 58.3% |
| Serbs | 10 | 41.7% |
| Total | 24 | 100% |
