= Gurdići =

Village in Olovo, Bosnia and Herzegovina

- Village
- Location within Bosnia and Herzegovina
- Coordinates: 44.1198031°N 18.6973463°E
- Country: Bosnia and Herzegovina
- Entity: Republika Srpska; Federation of Bosnia and Herzegovina
- Region Canton: Sarajevo; Zenica-Doboj
- Municipality: Sokolac; Olovo

Area
  - Total: 4.94 sq mi (12.79 km^{2})

Population (2013)
  - Total: 129
  - Density: 26.1/sq mi (10.1/km^{2})
- Time zone: UTC+1 (CET)
  - Summer (DST): UTC+2 (CEST)

Gurdići is a village in the municipality of Olovo, Bosnia and Herzegovina.

== Demographics ==
According to the 2013 census, its population was 129, with 108 people living in the Olovo part and 21 living in the Sokolac part.

Ethnicity in 2013
Ethnicity	Number	Percentage
Bosniaks	125	96.9%
Serbs	3	2.3%
other/undeclared	1	0.8%
Total	129	100%
