= Radačići =

Village in Olovo, Bosnia and Herzegovina

- Village
- Location within Bosnia and Herzegovina
- Coordinates: 44.16282°N 18.6139095°E
- Country: Bosnia and Herzegovina
- Entity: Federation of Bosnia and Herzegovina
- Canton: Zenica-Doboj
- Municipality: Olovo

Area
  - Total: 4.81 sq mi (12.46 km^{2})

Population (2013)
  - Total: 22
  - Density: 4.6/sq mi (1.8/km^{2})
- Time zone: UTC+1 (CET)
  - Summer (DST): UTC+2 (CEST)

Radačići is a village in the municipality of Olovo, Bosnia and Herzegovina. It is part of the Zenica-Doboj canton and the Federation of Bosnia and Herzegovina.

== Demographics ==
According to the 2013 census, its population was 22.

Ethnicity in 2013
Ethnicity	Number	Percentage
Serbs	12	54.5%
Bosniaks	10	45.5%
Total	22	100%
