= Bioštica =

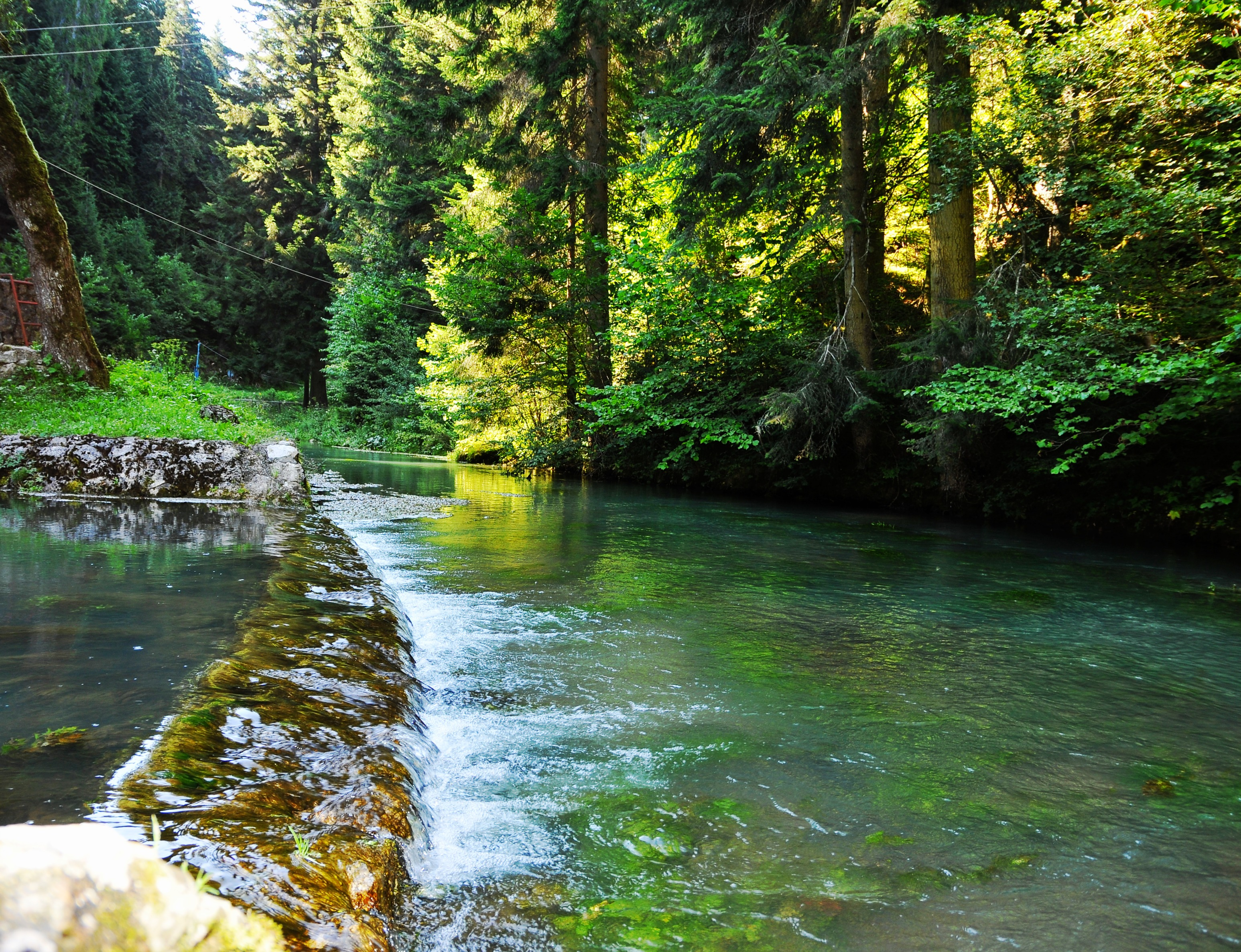
- Bioštica wellspring near Knežina, Bosnia and Herzegovina, protected landscape

- Location within Bosnia and Herzegovina

Location
- Country: Bosnia and Herzegovina
- Municipality: Sokolac, Olovo

Physical characteristics
- Source: Vrelo Bioštica
  - location: Knežina
  - coordinates: 43.991181°N 18.779313°E
  - elevation: cca.760 metres (2,490 ft)
- Mouth: Krivaja
  - location: Olovo
  - coordinates: 44.1260°N 18.5768°E
  - elevation: 530 metres (1,740 ft)
- Length: 32.5 kilometres (20.2 mi)

Basin features
- Progression: Krivaja→ Bosna→ Sava→ Danube→ Black Sea
- River system: Bosna

The Bioštica (Serbian Cyrillic: Биоштица) is a small river in the central-northern part of Bosnia and Herzegovina. The Bioštica meets the Stupčanica at the small town of Olovo. Together, they connect to form the Krivaja River, of which the Bioštica is the main left tributary.

Part of the Bioštica river canyon, "Zeleni Vir", is a well-known resort area and protected natural landscape zone in Bosnia and Herzegovina. From its confluence with the Kaljina river, the Bioštica runs toward Olovo for the final 12.3 kilometres (7.6 mi) of its course.

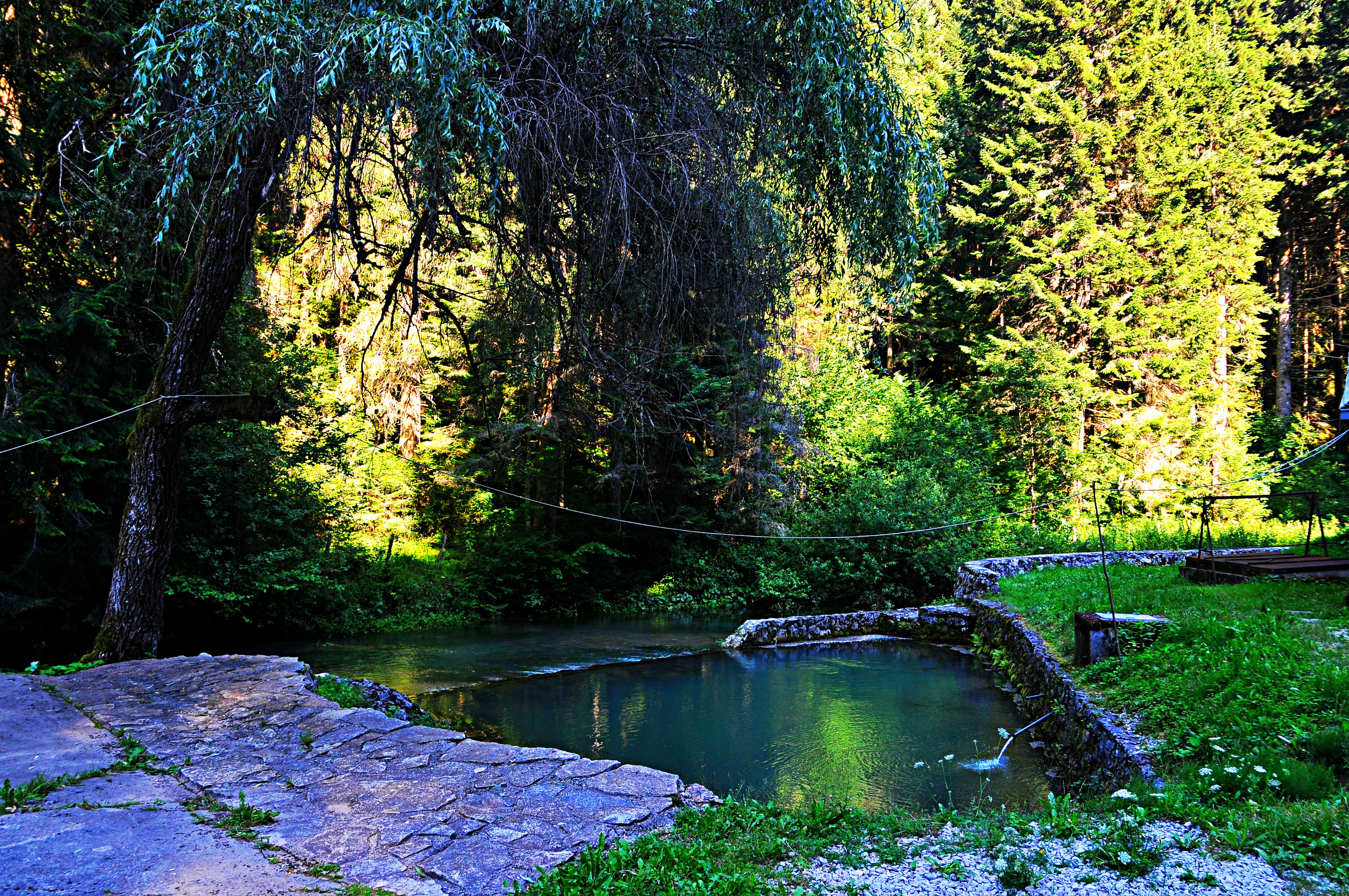
Bioštica wellspring, protected landscape.
