= Bukov Do =

Village in Olovo, Bosnia and Herzegovina

- Village
- Location within Bosnia and Herzegovina
- Coordinates: 44.1836977°N 18.5541112°E
- Country: Bosnia and Herzegovina
- Entity: Federation of Bosnia and Herzegovina
- Canton: Zenica-Doboj
- Municipality: Olovo

Area
  - Total: 1.64 sq mi (4.26 km^{2})

Population (2013)
  - Total: 113
  - Density: 68.7/sq mi (26.5/km^{2})
- Time zone: UTC+1 (CET)
  - Summer (DST): UTC+2 (CEST)

Bukov Do is a village in the municipality of Olovo, Bosnia and Herzegovina.

== Demographics ==
According to the 2013 census, its population was 113.

Ethnicity in 2013
Ethnicity	Number	Percentage
Bosniaks	112	99.1%
Croats	1	0.9%
Total	113	100%
