= Brda, Olovo =

Village in Olovo, Bosnia and Herzegovina

Brda
- Village
- Location within Bosnia and Herzegovina
- Coordinates: 44.1215597°N 18.6224845°E
- Country: Bosnia and Herzegovina
- Entity: Federation of Bosnia and Herzegovina
- Canton: Zenica-Doboj
- Municipality: Olovo

Area
  - Total: 1.33 sq mi (3.45 km^{2})

Population (2013)
  - Total: 268
  - Density: 201/sq mi (77.7/km^{2})
- Time zone: UTC+1 (CET)
  - Summer (DST): UTC+2 (CEST)

Brda is a village in the municipality of Olovo, Bosnia and Herzegovina.

== Demographics ==
According to the 2013 census, its population was 268.

Ethnicity in 2013
Ethnicity	Number	Percentage
Bosniaks	262	97.8%
Serbs	3	1.1%
Croats	2	0.7%
other/undeclared	1	0.4%
Total	268	100%
