= Grabovica, Olovo =

Village in Olovo, Bosnia and Herzegovina

Grabovica
- Village
- Location within Bosnia and Herzegovina
- Coordinates: 44.1554535°N 18.5996426°E
- Country: Bosnia and Herzegovina
- Entity: Federation of Bosnia and Herzegovina
- Canton: Zenica-Doboj
- Municipality: Olovo

Area
  - Total: 1.18 sq mi (3.06 km^{2})

Population (2013)
  - Total: 0
  - Density: 0.0/sq mi (0.0/km^{2})
- Time zone: UTC+1 (CET)
  - Summer (DST): UTC+2 (CEST)

Grabovica is a village in the municipality of Olovo, Bosnia and Herzegovina.

== Demographics ==
According to the 2013 census, its population was nil, down from 81 in 1991.
