= Berisalići =

Village in Olovo, Bosnia and Herzegovina

- Village
- Location within Bosnia and Herzegovina
- Coordinates: 44.1313469°N 18.6379346°E
- Country: Bosnia and Herzegovina
- Entity: Federation of Bosnia and Herzegovina
- Canton: Zenica-Doboj
- Municipality: Olovo

Area
  - Total: 2.58 sq mi (6.69 km^{2})

Population (2013)
  - Total: 451
  - Density: 175/sq mi (67.4/km^{2})
- Time zone: UTC+1 (CET)
  - Summer (DST): UTC+2 (CEST)

Berisalići is a village in the municipality of Olovo, Bosnia and Herzegovina.

== Demographics ==
According to the 2013 census, its population was 451.

Ethnicity in 2013
Ethnicity	Number	Percentage
Bosniaks	447	99.1%
other/undeclared	4	0.9%
Total	451	100%
