= Kolakovići, Olovo =

Village in Olovo, Bosnia and Herzegovina

Kolakovići
- Village
- Location within Bosnia and Herzegovina
- Coordinates: 44.1008595°N 18.662896°E
- Country: Bosnia and Herzegovina
- Entity: Federation of Bosnia and Herzegovina
- Region Canton: Sarajevo; Zenica-Doboj
- Municipality: Sokolac; Olovo

Area
  - Total: 2.51 sq mi (6.50 km^{2})

Population (2013)
  - Total: 145
  - Density: 57.8/sq mi (22.3/km^{2})
- Time zone: UTC+1 (CET)
  - Summer (DST): UTC+2 (CEST)

Kolakovići is a village in the municipalities of Sokolac (Republika Srpska) and Olovo, Bosnia and Herzegovina.

== Demographics ==
According to the 2013 census, its population was 145.

Ethnicity in 2013
Ethnicity	Number	Percentage
Bosniaks	138	95.2%
Serbs	5	3.4%
other/undeclared	2	1.4%
Total	145	100%
