= Solun, Olovo =

Village in Olovo, Bosnia and Herzegovina

Solun
- Village
- Location within Bosnia and Herzegovina
- Coordinates: 44.1665872°N 18.5263618°E
- Country: Bosnia and Herzegovina
- Entity: Federation of Bosnia and Herzegovina
- Canton: Zenica-Doboj
- Municipality: Olovo

Area
  - Total: 1.39 sq mi (3.60 km^{2})

Population (2013)
  - Total: 375
  - Density: 270/sq mi (104/km^{2})
- Time zone: UTC+1 (CET)
  - Summer (DST): UTC+2 (CEST)

Solun is a village in the municipality of Olovo, Bosnia and Herzegovina.

== Demographics ==
According to the 2013 census, its population was 375, all Bosniaks.
