= Ponijerka =

Village in Olovo, Bosnia and Herzegovina

- Village
- Location within Bosnia and Herzegovina
- Coordinates: 44.148654°N 18.5780723°E
- Country: Bosnia and Herzegovina
- Entity: Federation of Bosnia and Herzegovina
- Canton: Zenica-Doboj
- Municipality: Olovo

Area
  - Total: 4.35 sq mi (11.27 km^{2})

Population (2013)
  - Total: 81
  - Density: 19/sq mi (7.2/km^{2})
- Time zone: UTC+1 (CET)
  - Summer (DST): UTC+2 (CEST)

Ponijerka is a village in the municipality of Olovo, Bosnia and Herzegovina.

== Demographics ==
According to the 2013 census, its population was 81.

Ethnicity in 2013
Ethnicity	Number	Percentage
Bosniaks	76	93.8%
other/undeclared	5	6.2%
Total	81	100%
