= Boganovići =

Village in Olovo, Bosnia and Herzegovina

- Village
- Location within Bosnia and Herzegovina
- Coordinates: 44.1362193°N 18.5451001°E
- Country: Bosnia and Herzegovina
- Entity: Federation of Bosnia and Herzegovina
- Canton: Zenica-Doboj
- Municipality: Olovo

Area
  - Total: 2.88 sq mi (7.45 km^{2})

Population (2013)
  - Total: 215
  - Density: 74.7/sq mi (28.9/km^{2})
- Time zone: UTC+1 (CET)
  - Summer (DST): UTC+2 (CEST)

Boganovići is a village in the municipality of Olovo, Bosnia and Herzegovina.

== Demographics ==
According to the 2013 census, its population was 215.

Ethnicity in 2013
Ethnicity	Number	Percentage
Bosniaks	210	97.7%
other/undeclared	5	2.3%
Total	215	100%
