= Franciscan friary, Kraljeva Sutjeska =

Franciscan friary, Kraljeva Sutjeska, Bosnia and Herzegovina

Coordinates: 44°07′02″N 18°12′20″E

Kraljeva Sutjeska
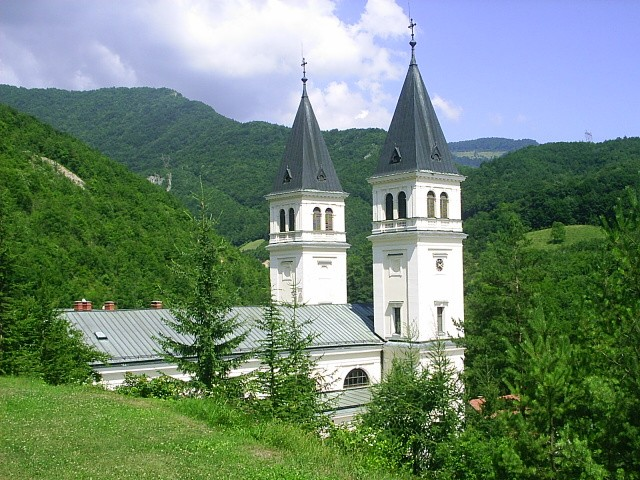
- Interactive map of Kraljeva Sutjeska

Monastery information
- Order: Franciscan
- Established: 14th century
- Diocese: Roman Catholic Archdiocese of Vrhbosna

Architecture
- Heritage designation

KONS of Bosnia and Herzegovina
- Official name: The architectural ensemble of the Franciscan monastery in Kraljeva Sutjeska together with its movable property
- Type: Category I cultural and historical property
- Criteria: II. Value; A, B, C i.ii.iii.iv.v.vi., D i.ii.iii.iv.v., E i.ii.iii.iv.v., F i.ii.iii., G i.ii.iii.iv.v.vi.vii., H i.iii., I i.ii.iii.iv.
- Designated: January 20, 2004 (session No. -, Sarajevo)
- Reference no.: 1930
- Decision no.: 06.1-2-41/03-3
- Listed: List of National Monuments of Bosnia and Herzegovina
- Operator: Franciscan friary Kraljeva Sutjeska

Site
- Location: Kraljeva Sutjeska, Kakanj; Bosnia and Herzegovina

Kraljeva Sutjeska is a Bosnian Franciscan monastery in Bosnia and Herzegovina. It is located near Kakanj, in the village of Kraljeva Sutjeska. The architectural ensemble of the Franciscan monastery in Kraljeva Sutjeska together with its movable property is included into the list of National Monuments of Bosnia and Herzegovina by KONS, on 20 January 2004.

It includes a museum in which it houses historical treasures, a library which keeps rare and valuable historical records. There are around 11,000 works in the library, including 31 incunabula and works in Bosnian Cyrillic. The earliest parish register is preserved since 1641. There are also a number of Ottoman Turkish documents.

It also includes Grgurevo, a site where the kings' castle from 1330 along with his remains are located.

The historically important dwelling of Bosnian kings, Bobovac, is also a short distance from the castle remains and the monastery, as well as other sights of Kraljeva Sutjeska.

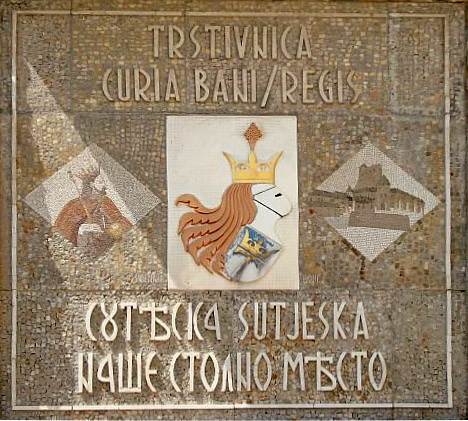
Kraljeva Sutjeska (Curia bani)

== See also ==
- Franciscan Province of Bosna Srebrena
