= Konjuh (mountain) =

Mountain in the north-east part of Bosnia and Herzegovina

- Коњух
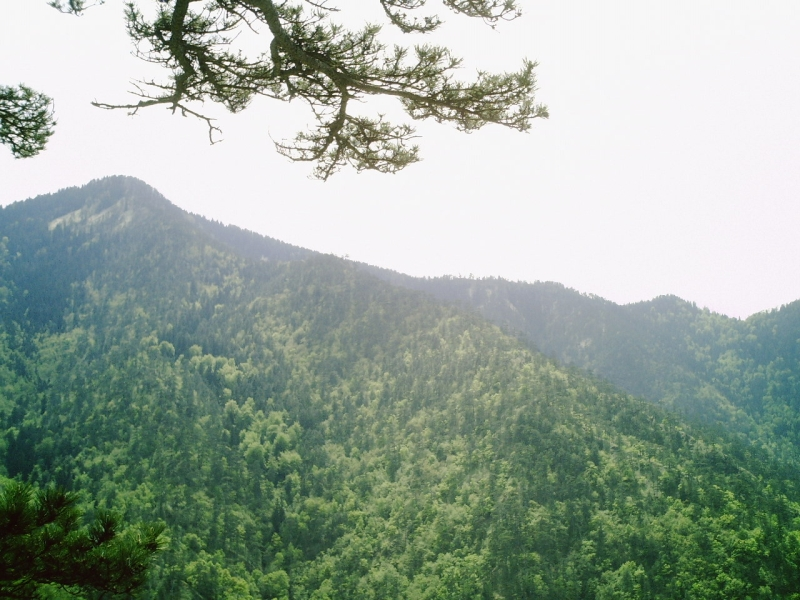
- Konjuh summit taken from Varda

Highest point
- Elevation: 1,328 m (4,357 ft)
- Coordinates: 44°18′06″N 18°32′46″E

Geography
- Location within Bosnia and Herzegovina
- Parent range: Dinaric Alps

Konjuh is a mountain in the north-east part of Bosnia and Herzegovina. The mountain is bordered by the rivers Seona, Turija, Litva, and Oskova on the north, the river Gostelja and the highway Tuzla–Sarajevo on the north-east. The river Krivaja is located on south and west. With Ozren, Javor and Javornik, Konjuh makes part of a mountain chain which, with Trebavac and Majevica, presents a transition of the Dinaric mountain system to the spacious Panonian plain.

The average altitude of this mountain is 1,000 meters. Peaks above this altitude include: Šuplji Javor (1,157 m), Vina Kruška (1,088 m), Suho Drvlje (1,206 m), Zidine (1,180m), Brezina (1,120 m), Vrh Konjuha (1,328 m) and Bandijerka, the top of Javorje (1,261 m), Bijeli Vrh (1,272 m) and Zečiji Rat (1,275 m) on the southwestern comb Smolin.

== Flora and fauna ==
Konjuh is covered with dense vegetation in conifer which prevails (pine, spruce), beech, maple and in a small number oak. On the mountain grows very rare and curative great yellow gentian – srčanik (Gentiana lutea), which, on this mountain, is protected and endangered.

The woods of Konjuh are home to wild animals like brown bears, roe deer, wild boar, wolves, foxes, squirrels, grouse, owls ravens and, in the streams and rivers, trout and crayfish. Snakes that live here are horned viper, common vipers, copperhead, and also lizards, green lizards and salamanders.

== Cultural and historical monuments ==
On the mountain of Konjuh there are many necropolises stećaks, and only in the municipality of Kladanj 500 stećaks are known. There are also ruins of a caravan road which is used for transport of salt from Tuzla, as well as monuments from World War II in Yugoslavia.

== Mountain protection ==
Hiking associations and nature lovers have been trying for years to convince authorities that part of the mountain is called a protected natural zone. The Government of Tuzla Canton adopted a law for declaring parts of the mountain Konjuh a protected natural zone. Act on the declaration of part of the Konjuh mountain area as the Protected Landscape Konjuh was adopted in 2009 and confirmed in 2014 (Službene novine Tuzlanskog Kantona, br. 13/09 i 8/14).

== See also ==
- List of mountains in Bosnia and Herzegovina

== Bibliography ==
- Guber, Mihovil (1943). "Pustošenje planinarskih objekata u južnoj Hrvatskoj" [The Desolation of Mountain Objects in Southern Croatia] (PDF). Hrvatski planinar (in Croatian). Vol. 39, no. 6–7. pp. 85–93. ISSN 0354-0650.
