= Čatići =

Village in Kakanj, Bosnia and Herzegovina

- Village
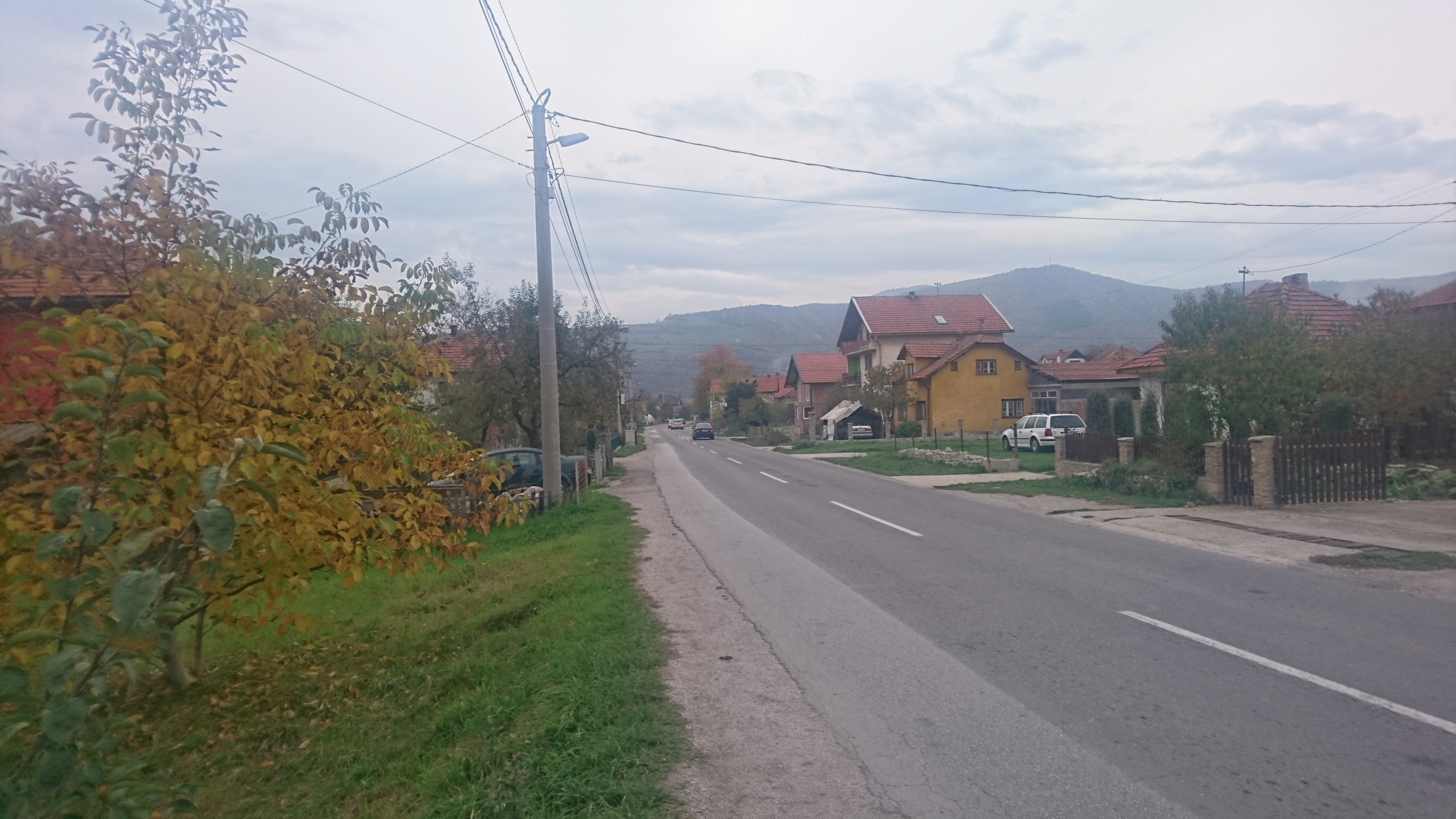

- Location within Bosnia and Herzegovina
- Coordinates: 44°05′44″N 18°07′02″E
- Country: Bosnia and Herzegovina
- Entity: Federation of Bosnia and Herzegovina
- Canton: Zenica-Doboj
- Municipality: Kakanj

Area
  - Total: 0.72 sq mi (1.87 km^{2})

Population (2013)
  - Total: 1,070
  - Density: 1,480/sq mi (572/km^{2})
- Time zone: UTC+1 (CET)
  - Summer (DST): UTC+2 (CEST)

Čatići is a village in the municipality of Kakanj, Bosnia and Herzegovina.

== Demographics ==
According to the 2013 census, its population was 1,070.

Ethnicity in 2013
Ethnicity	Number	Percentage
Bosniaks	704	65.8%
Croats	331	30.9%
Serbs	4	0.4%
other/undeclared	31	2.9%
Total	1,070	100%

== Notable people from Čatići ==
- Bono Benić, franciscan, historian
