= Ligatići =

Village in Vareš, Bosnia and Herzegovina

- Village
- Location within Bosnia and Herzegovina
- Coordinates: 44.1684273°N 18.5068435°E
- Country: Bosnia and Herzegovina
- Entity: Federation of Bosnia and Herzegovina
- Canton: Zenica-Doboj
- Municipality: Vareš

Area
  - Total: 0.92 sq mi (2.39 km^{2})

Population (2013)
  - Total: 187
  - Density: 203/sq mi (78.2/km^{2})
- Time zone: UTC+1 (CET)
  - Summer (DST): UTC+2 (CEST)

Ligatići is a village in the municipality of Vareš, Bosnia and Herzegovina.

== Demographics ==
According to the 2013 census, its population was 187.

Ethnicity in 2013
Ethnicity	Number	Percentage
Bosniaks	182	97.3%
Serbs	1	0.5%
other/undeclared	4	2.1%
Total	187	100%
