= Stupčanica =

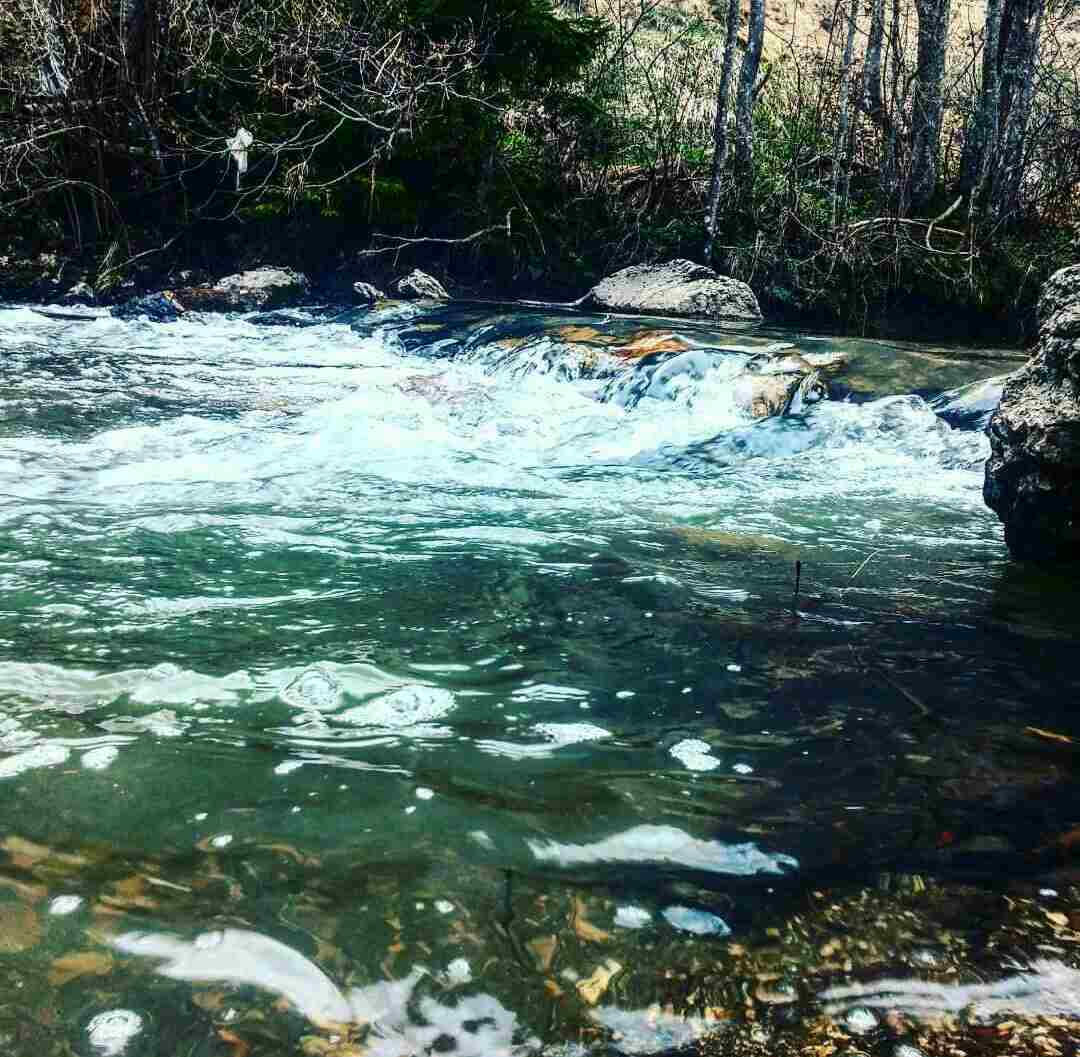

Location
- Country: Bosnia and Herzegovina

Physical characteristics
- Source
  - location: Olovo
  - coordinates: 44.08985°N 18.83477°E
- Mouth
  - location: Krivaja
  - coordinates: 44.1260°N 18.5768°E
  - elevation: 530 metres (1,740 ft)

Basin features
- Progression: Krivaja→ Bosna→ Sava→ Danube→ Black Sea

The Stupčanica (Serbian Cyrillic: Ступчаница) is a small river in central-northern part of Bosnia and Herzegovina. The Stupčanica meets with the Bioštica at the small town of Olovo, and with the Bioštica it makes a pair of the Krivaja source headwaters and its right tributary. The Stupčanica river canyon, Čude Canyon, is a protected natural monument of Bosnia and Herzegovina.
