= Kraljeva Sutjeska =

Village in Kakanj, Bosnia and Herzegovina

- Village
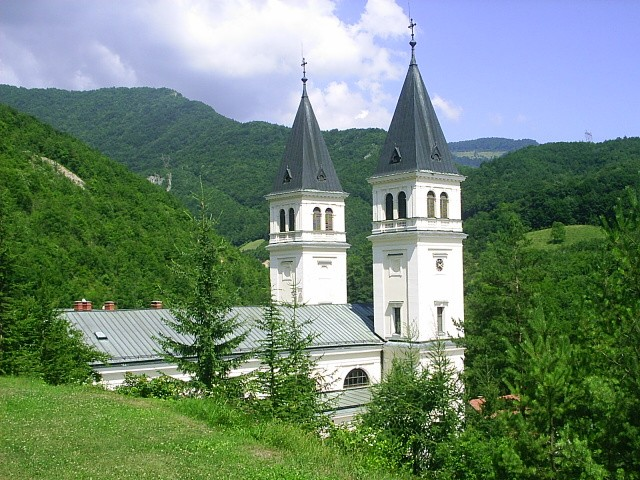
- Franciscan monastery

- Location within Bosnia and Herzegovina
- Coordinates: 44°07′N 18°12′E
- Country: Bosnia and Herzegovina
- Entity: Federation of Bosnia and Herzegovina
- Canton: Zenica-Doboj
- Municipality: Kakanj
- Named for: Court of Bosnian kings in the Middle Ages

Area
  - Total: 1.27 sq mi (3.28 km^{2})

Population (2013)
  - Total: 248
  - Density: 196/sq mi (75.6/km^{2})
- Demonym: Sutjesćani
- Time zone: UTC+1 (CET)
  - Summer (DST): UTC+2 (CEST)
- Website: stolnomjesto.com

Kraljeva Sutjeska (sometimes Kraljevska Sutjeska, or just Sutjeska or Sutiska, historically Trstivnica, in local tradition Naše stolno misto) is a village in the municipality of Kakanj, Bosnia and Herzegovina. The village has historical significance and rich heritage, and during the Middle Ages it used to be the capital of the Banate of Bosnia.

== History and heritage ==
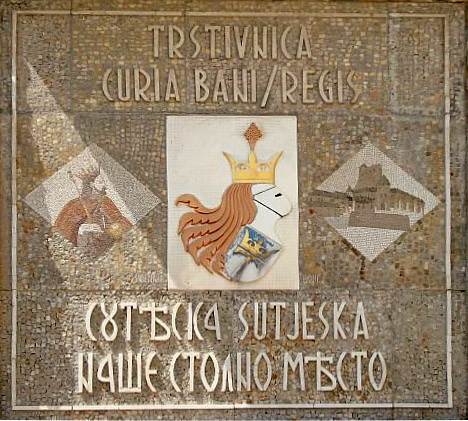
Above insignia: Latin: Trstivnica (Trstionica medieval village & river) - Latin: Curia Bani / Regis (transl. Ban's / Royal Office) below insignia: Bosnian Cyrillic: Сɣmѣскɖ ɴɖшє сmоʌɴо ʍѣсmо (Bosnian: Sutjeska naše stolno mjesto, transl. Sutjeska ours ruling seat)

The village of Kraljeva Sutjeska, in the municipality of Kakanj, Bosnia and Herzegovina, has historical significance and rich heritage. During the Middle Ages it used to be a capital of medieval Bosnian state, and a place where the main court of the royal Bosnian Kotromanić dynasty was situated. The town was called Trstivnica in official state charters of that time. It is situated at the foothills of Zvijezda mountain. A couple of kilometres above the Sutjeska, through the canyon of the Bukovica stream in the northeastern direction deep in the mountain, the historic fortress-city of Bobovac was situated on a high ridge, which was also a secluded royal seat of the Bosnian kings. The village hosts a number of important historical sites:

- Ruins of the medieval Bosnian Court. The court in Trstivnica, today pronounced as Trstionica (present-day Kraljeva Sutjeska; the river which passes through is also still called Trstionica today), was established by Ban of Bosnia, Stjepan II Kotromanić, who moved the court from Visoko. The compound consisted of several buildings, chapel, and the nucleus of what will later become Kraljeva Sutjeska Franciscan Monastery.
- A 14th century Catholic Franciscan monastery in Kraljeva Sutjeska
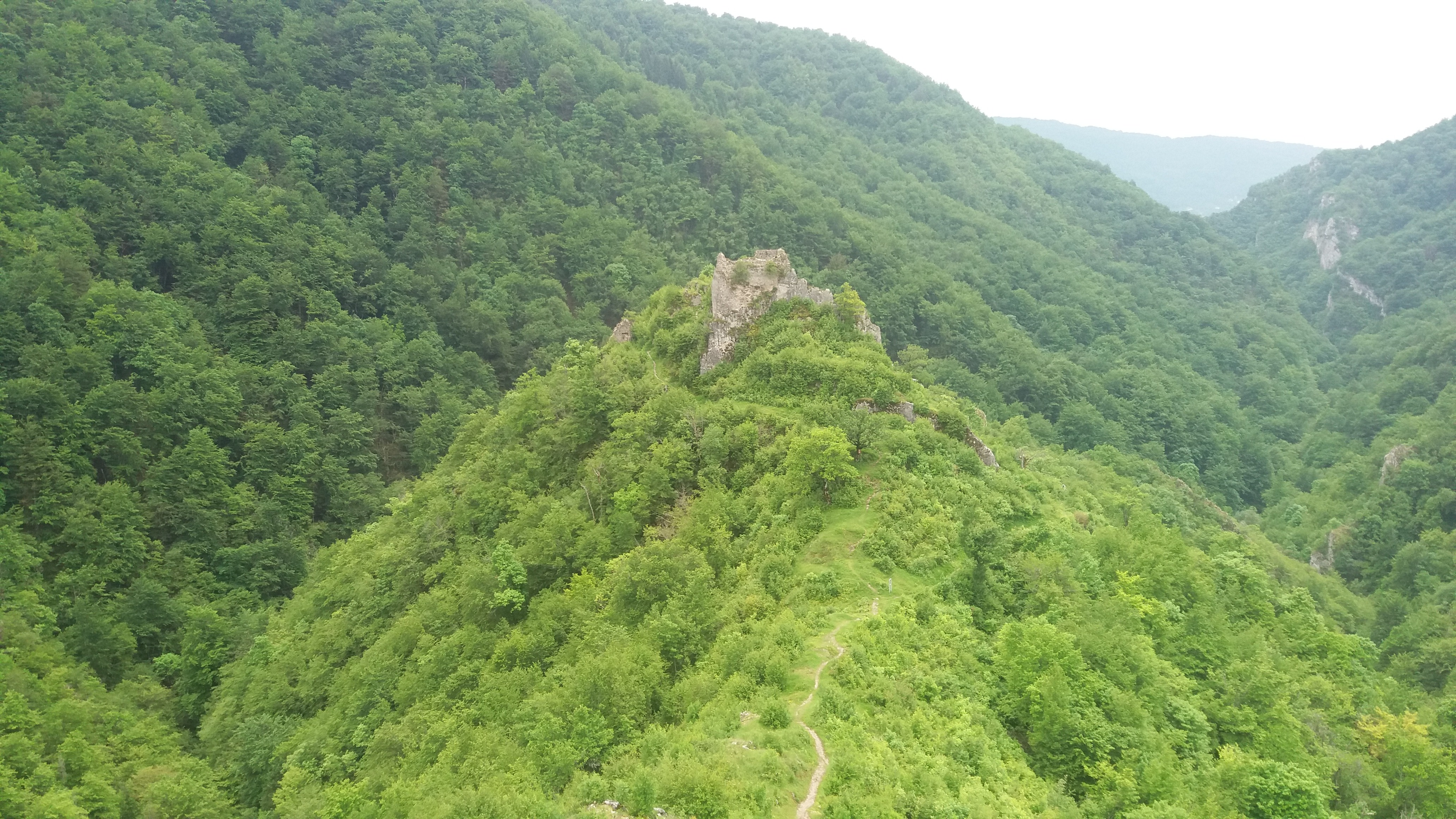
  Bobovac, royal city-fortress, above the Bukovica canyon.
- Bobovac, the residency of the Bosnian kings during medieval times and the site of the mausoleum of the royals and remnants of the Kotromanić dynasty castle
- An old Bosnian house with the original architecture from the 18th century
- The Mehmed II Fatih mosque from the 15th century, claimed to be the oldest in Bosnia and Herzegovina

== Demographics ==
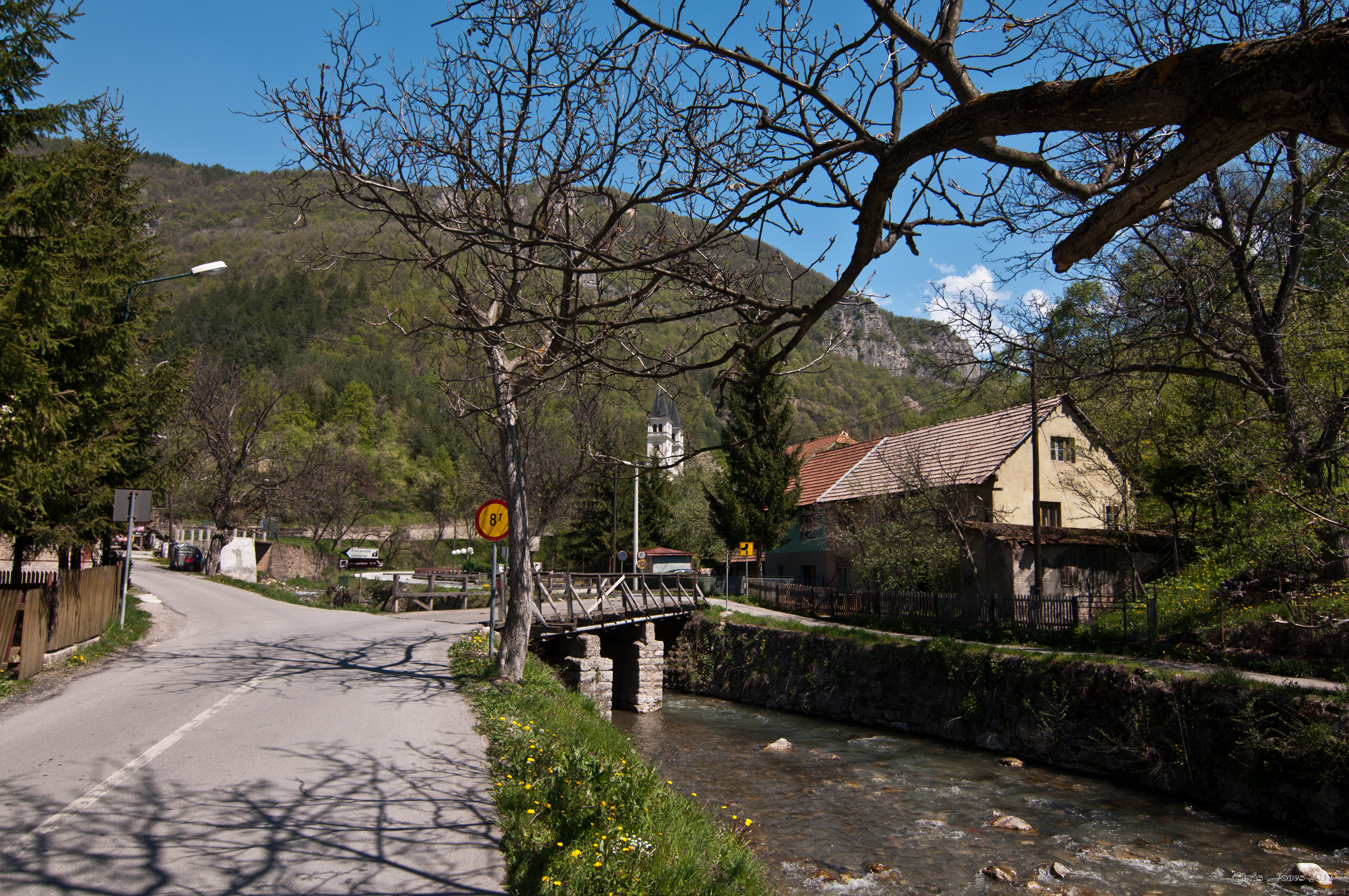
The Trstionica river runs through Kraljeva Sutjeska

According to the 2013 census, its population was 248.

Ethnicity in 2013
Ethnicity	Number	Percentage
Croats	214	86.3%
Bosniaks	22	8.9%
Serbs	2	0.8%
other/undeclared	10	4.0%
Total	248	100%

== Notable people ==
- Dejan Lovren, Croatian footballer was raised in Kraljeva Sutjeska until he fled during the war.
- René Maric, Assistant Head Coach at Bundesliga side FC Bayern Munchen. Ancestry from Kraljeva Sutjeska.
- Leon Susnja, Croatian handball player has roots in Kraljeva Sutjeska.
- Ivan Sunjic, footballer in the national team of Bosnia and Herzegowina, has roots in Kraljeva Sutjeska.
