= Olovo =

Olovo Олово
- Town and municipality
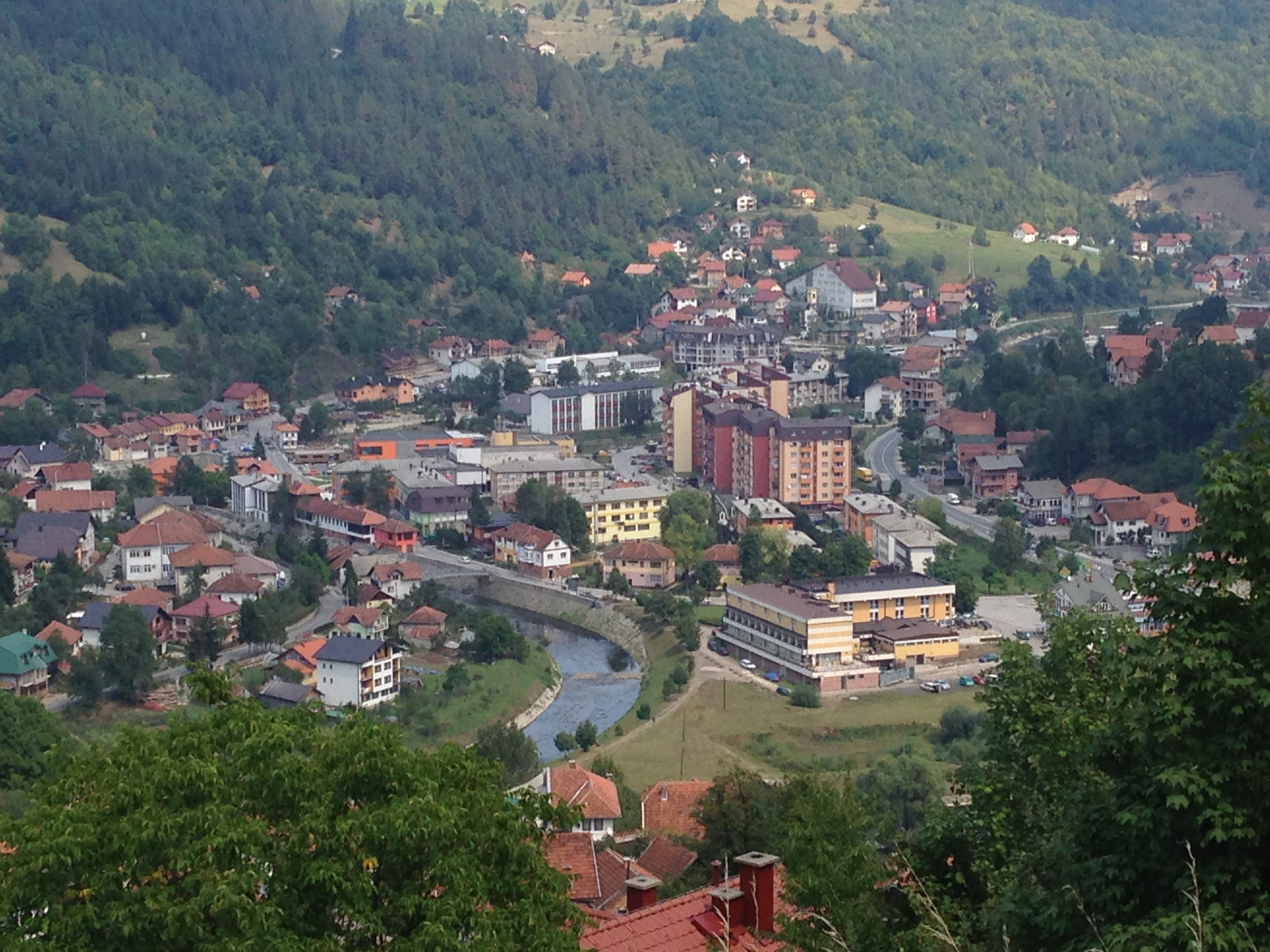
- View of Olovo

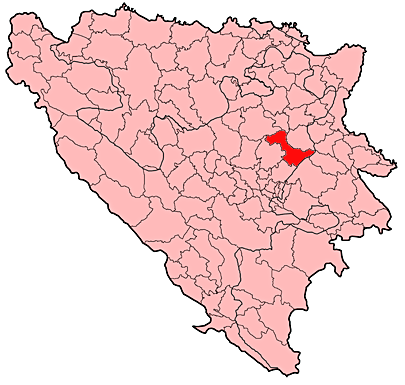
- Location of the Olovo Municipality within Bosnia and Herzegovina

- Location within Bosnia and Herzegovina
- Coordinates: 44°7′39″N 18°34′48″E
- Country: Bosnia and Herzegovina
- Entity: Federation of Bosnia and Herzegovina
- Canton: Zenica-Doboj

Government
  - Municipal mayor: Đemal Memagić (SDA)

Area
  - Town and municipality: 4,078 km^{2} (1,575 sq mi)

Population (2013 census)
  - Town and municipality: 10,175
  - Density: 26/km^{2} (67/sq mi)
  - Urban: 2,465
  - Rural: 7,710
- Time zone: UTC+1 (CET)
  - Summer (DST): UTC+2 (CEST)
- Area code: +387 32
- Website: www.olovo.ba

Olovo (Serbian Cyrillic: Олово) is a town and municipality located in the Zenica-Doboj Canton of the Federation of Bosnia and Herzegovina, an entity of Bosnia and Herzegovina. It is situated about 50 kilometers northeast of the capital city of Sarajevo and is located on the road between Sarajevo and Tuzla.

== History ==
The town Olovo was first mentioned in the year 1382 under the name "Plumbum" (Latin for lead). The word olovo in Bosnian means lead, and the name was given to the town for its well-known lead ore deposits. Olovo stands on the Sarajevo–Tuzla highway M18, and is located 50 km northeast of Bosnia and Herzegovina's capital city of Sarajevo. Olovo is located in the Zenica-Doboj Canton. Recently, there have been attempts to make Olovo part of the Sarajevo Canton; however, the town remains within the Zenica-Doboj Canton .

=== Middle Ages ===
Since the Middle Ages, the town has been well known for its lead ore deposits, and Olovo was a mining town during medieval Bosnian state period, when the town and the region were part of the Pavlović's Land (Serbo-Croatian Latin: Zemlja Pavlovića).

=== World War II ===
During WW2, Olovo came under the occupation of the Independent State of Croatia in 1941. On 1 November 1941, four Chetnik companies with 400 Chetniks and parts of Partisan Romanija Detachment (Knežina, Bjelogoračka and Crepoljska companies) and Zvijezda Detachment (Nišić battalion and Crnovrška and Vlahinjska company) with total of 800 Partisans organized an unsuccessful attack on Olovo.

The insurgents then stopped their artillery fire and replaced it with barrages of rifle fire of the infantry insurgent units. The commander of the 4th company of Sarajevo Reserve Battalion, Ante Marinković was wounded during this attack and his company had to retreat from "Stijena". After being inforced by one reserve platoon this company managed to recapture "Stijena" for short time only to retreat after being attacked by more numerous Chetnik forces. When Chetniks permanently captured "Stijena" they burned straws as signal to other insurgents about their success. This boosted morale of the insurgents to attack more fiercely the positions of Olovo garrison that began retreating from their positions. To avoid capture of his forces, garrison commander Streharski retreat to the positions west of the village Solun. On 17 December 1941 Olovo was recaptured by Chetnik and Partisan rebel units.

On 18 December Streharski continued his retreat under fire until his forces reached Careva Ćuprija.

=== Bosnian War ===
At the beginning of the Bosnian War, Olovo came under the control of the ARBiH.

Olovo was included in the Federation of Bosnia and Herzegovina in the Dayton Agreement, which was signed on 14 December 1995, ending the Bosnian War.

== Tourism and heritage ==
Today, Olovo is best known for its coniferous forests, blue sky, and clear swift waters coming from three main mountain rivers, the Stupčanica, Krivaja, and Bioštica. It is a popular nightlife spot for youth from nearby villages. Olovo is also well known for its spa built around mineral rich hot springs, which dates back to the period of Roman reign in the area. There are also several hot springs along the course of the Krivaja river, downstream from Olovo. These hot springs are well known though only provisionally captured with a tub made of roughly cut block of stones dating back to Roman times.

the region is also known for its hunting grounds in surrounding forests, while several protected nature parks are established around nearby mountains and canyons, such as protected areas on Konjuh and Zvijezda, Čude Canyon, Bioštica river canyon, with many culture-historical heritage site from times of medieval Bosnia.

Olovo is also a stopover for travelers to rest and change directions when traveling to cities such as Sarajevo to Tuzla, or Zenica and Zavidovići.

== Demographics ==
According to the 2013 census, its population was 10,175 with 2,465 living in Olovo town.

Ethnic Composition
| Year | Serbs | % | Bosniaks | % | Croats | % | Yugoslavs | % | others | % | Total |
| 1961 | 3,635 | 32.07% | 5,903 | 52.09% | 314 | 2.77% | 1,402 | 12.37% | | | 11,333 |
| 1971 | 3,601 | 23.68% | 10,546 | 69.36% | 930 | 6.11% | 46 | 0.30% | 80 | 0.55% | 15,203 |
| 1981 | 3,349 | 20.49% | 11,593 | 70.94% | 802 | 4.91% | 508 | 3.12% | | | 16,341 |
| 1991 | 3,196 | 18.91% | 12,699 | 75.14% | 653 | 3.86% | 282 | 1.67% | | | 16,901 |
| 2013 | 77 | 0.75% | 9,701 | 95.34% | 230 | 2.26% | 0 | 0.00% | 139 | 1.36% | 10,175 |

== Populated places ==
There are many small villages in the vicinity of Olovo. These are: Boganovići, Čuništa, Solun, Hadre, Bukovdo, Milankovići, Kamensko, Jelaške, Careva Ćuprija, Lišći, Gurdići, Dugandžići, Čude, Petrovići, Klis, Kolakovići, Berisalići, Brda, Luke, Lavšići, Ponijerka, Grabovica, Dreželj, Paklenik, Majna, Radačići, Ajvatovići, Miljevići, Rudine, Ligatići and Bakići.

== Notable people ==
- Longin Krčo, Serbian Orthodox bishop
- Jelena Blagojević, Serbian volleyball player
- Tima Džebo, Yugoslav and Bosnian basketball player
- Daniel Ozmo, Yugoslav Jewish painter and printmaker
- Edin Višća, Bosnian football player
