= List of grand dukes of Bosnia =

The title Grand Duke of Bosnia was a court title in the Kingdom of Bosnia, bestowed by the King to highest military commanders. It was usually reserved for the most influential and capable members of the highest Bosnian nobility. To interpret it as an office rather than merely a court rank could be more accurate.

== Grand Dukes of Bosnia ==
Picture	^{Title}Name	House	Reign (term in office)	_{fl.}Monarch	Notes
	^{Duke} Hrana Vuković	of Kosača	fl. ?-1380	Tvrtko I Kotromanić Banate of Bosnia, Kingdom of Bosnia	
	possibly^{Duke} Pavle Radinović	of Radinović	fl. 1381–1392	Tvrtko I Kotromanić Kingdom of Bosnia	
	^{Duke} Hrvoje Vukčić	of Vukčić-Hrvatinić	fl. 1380–1388 _{again from} 1392–1416	Tvrtko I, _{from 1391 to 1395} Stephen Dabiša, _{1398–1404 again 1409 to 1418} Stephen Ostoja Kingdom of Bosnia	
	^{Duke} Vlatko Vuković	of Vuković	fl. 1388–1392	Tvrtko I Kotromanić _{from 1391 to 1395} Dabiša of Bosnia Kingdom of Bosnia	
	^{Duke} Sandalj Hranić	of Hranić	fl. 1392–1435	_{from 1391 to 1395} Dabiša of Bosnia, _{1395–1398} Helen of Bosnia, _{1398–1404 again 1409 to 1418} Ostoja of Bosnia, _{1404–1409 again 1420–1443} Tvrtko II of Bosnia, _{1418–1420} Stephen Ostojić of Bosnia, _{1443–1461} Thomas of Bosnia, _{1461–1463} Stephen Tomašević of Bosnia Kingdom of Bosnia	
	^{Duke} Petar Pavlović	of Pavlović	fl. 1417–1420	_{1409 to 1418} Ostoja of Bosnia, _{1418–1420} Stephen Ostojić of Bosnia Kingdom of Bosnia	
	^{Duke} Radislav Pavlović	of Pavlović	fl. 1420–1441	Tvrtko II of Bosnia, _{1443–1461} Thomas of Bosnia Kingdom of Bosnia	
	^{Duke} Stjepan Vukčić Kosača	of Kosača	fl. 1435–1466	_{–1443} Tvrtko II of Bosnia, _{1443–1461} Thomas of Bosnia, _{1461–1463} Stjepan Tomašević Kingdom of Bosnia	
	^{Duke} Ivaniš Pavlović	of Pavlović	fl. 1441–1450	_{–1443} Tvrtko II of Bosnia, _{1443–1461} Thomas of Bosnia Kingdom of Bosnia	
	^{Duke, Herzog} Vladislav Hercegović	of Kosača	fl. cca. 1465–1469	Matija Sabančić, _{1465–1471} Sultan Mehmed II Kingdom of Bosnia (puppet monarchy)	
	possibly^{Duke} Petar II Pavlović	of Pavlović	fl. 1450–1463	_{1443–1461} Thomas of Bosnia, _{1461–1463} Stjepan Tomašević Kingdom of Bosnia	
_{Note: in some periods "term in office" overlapped} _{Note: "Veliki vojvoda bosanski" transl. Grand Duke of Bosnia was established as an office and was first mentioned in 1333, but it was transformed into hereditary noble title in the beginning of the 15th century}

== See also ==
- List of dukes of Bosnia
- List of rulers of Bosnia
- List of Bosnian consorts
