= Vlatko Hercegović =

15th century Bosnian nobleman

- Duke of Saint Sava
- Reign: 1466–1482
- Predecessor: Stjepan Vukčić Kosača
- Born: c. 1428
- Died: 1489 probably Istanbul
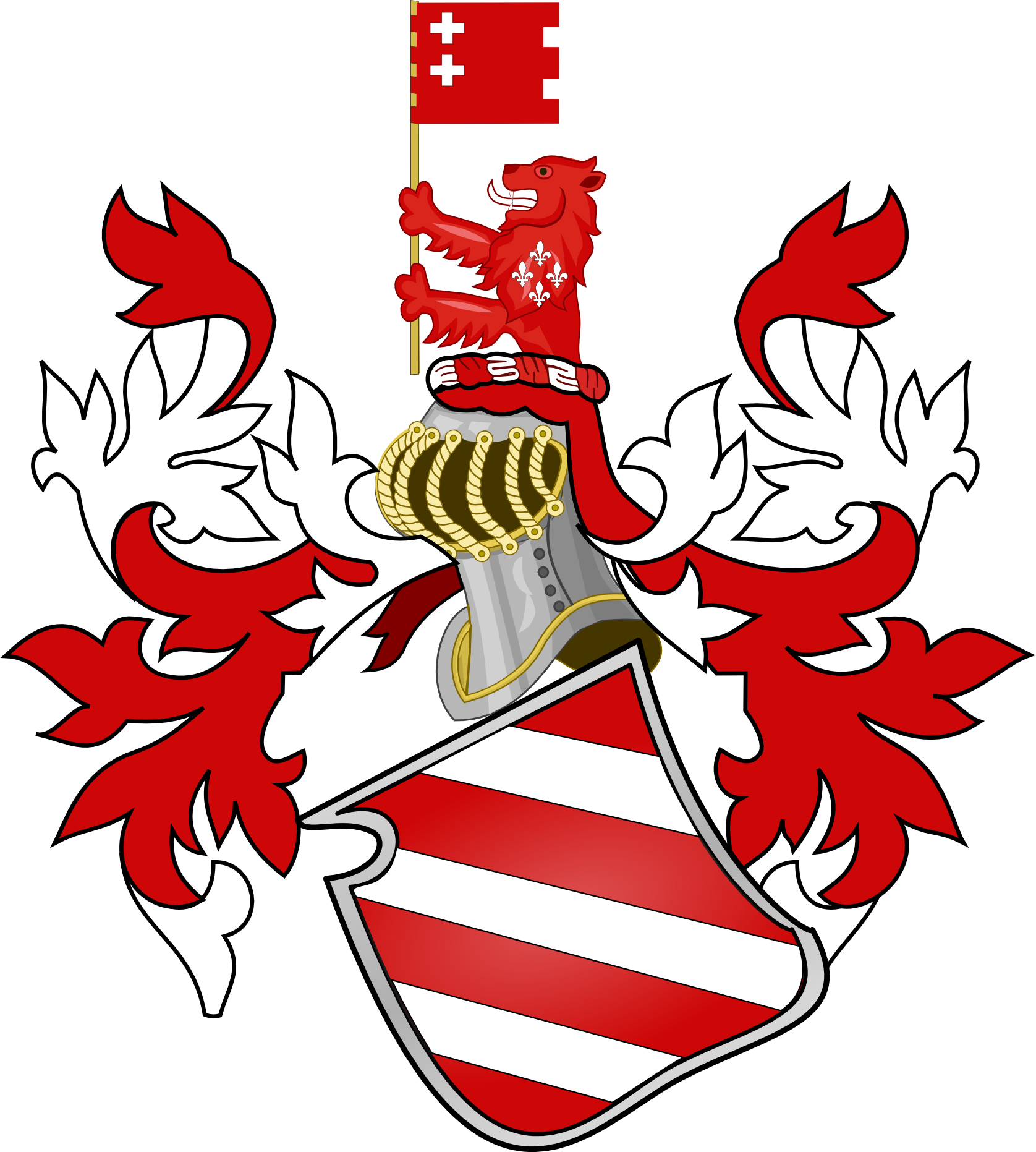
- Noble family: Kosača
- Spouse: A half-sister of Ulrich II of Celje, An Apulian noblewoman
- Father: Stjepan Vukčić Kosača
- Mother: Jelena Balšić

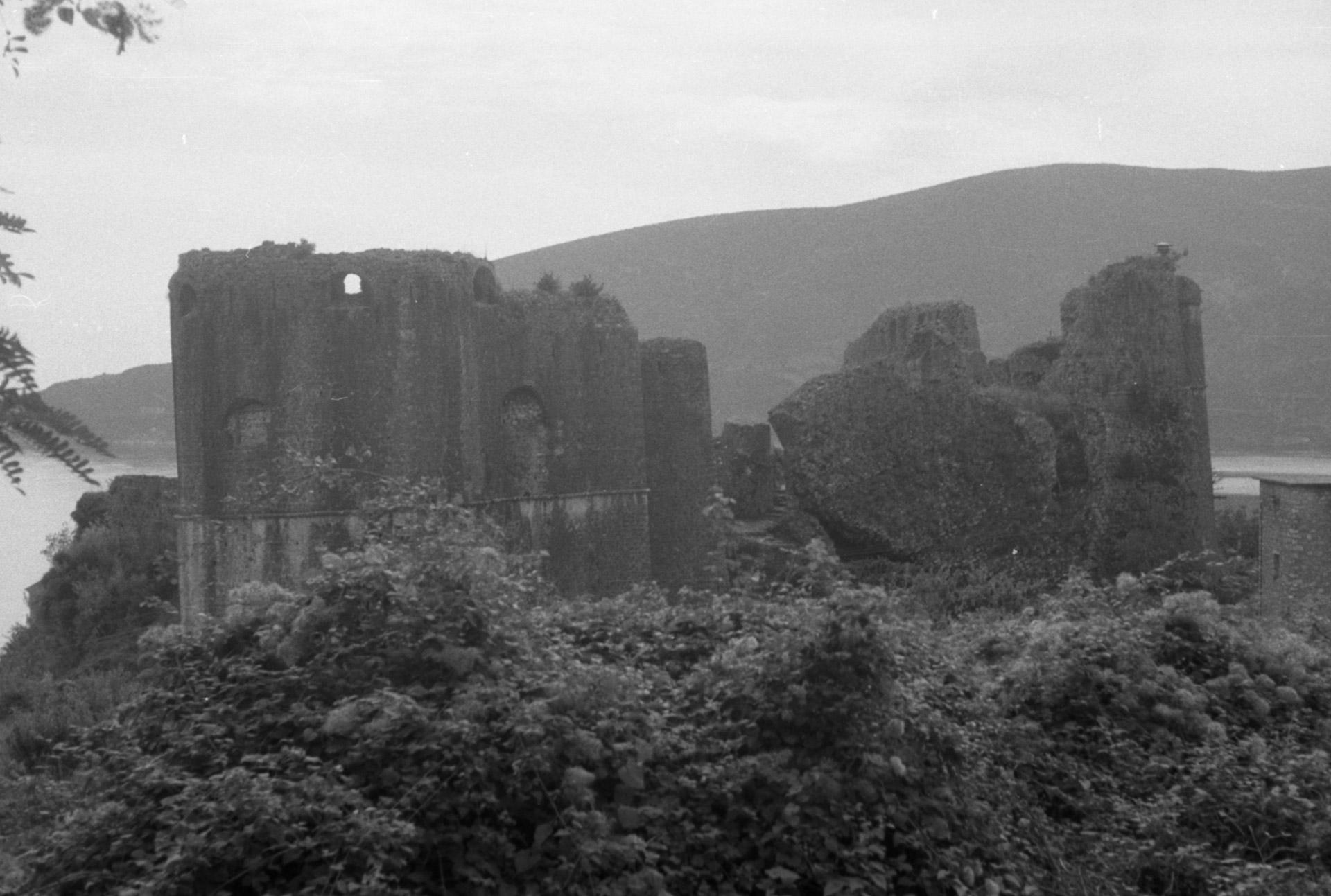
Fortress of Novi, built by Tvrtko I in 1382, with its newly founded port immediately became economic hub of the kingdom and later winter seat of Stjepan and his son Vlatko.

Vlatko Hercegović (Serbian Cyrillic: Влатко Херцеговић; c. 1428–1489), was the second and the last Herzog of Saint Sava, succeeding his father Stjepan Vukčić in 1466.

== Succession ==
After the fall of the Bosnian kingdom in 1463, herceg Stjepan Vukčić, lord of its southernmost province, lived for another three years, enough to see the kingdom's complete dismantling. For this Stjepan blamed his eldest son Vladislav Hercegović. On 21 May 1466, the old and terminally ill duke dictated his last words, recorded in a testament, and bypassing Vladislav he condemned him by saying that it was Vladislav who "brought the great Turk to Bosnia to the death and destruction of us all". The next day, on 22 May 1466, the duke died.

Stjepan Vukčić was succeeded as herceg by his second and younger son Vlatko Hercegović, who struggled to retain as much of the territory he could.

== Continued struggle ==
However, Blagaj, the Kosača capital, fell in 1466, while Ključ fort between Nevesinje and Gacko was cut off from the main part of his territory, although Vlatko's actions against the Ottomans were mostly concentrated around this fort with limited success. A few years earlier, in August 1464, he was wounded and forced to take a refuge in the Republic of Ragusa. In 1467 he came with his Apulian bride to Ragusa.

Počitelj fell in 1471, however, herceg Vlatko already in 1470 realized that only radical change in his politics could bring him some release, so he pursued and achieved a peace with the Ottomans. In the same year, the Ottomans excluded Hum from the Bosnian Sanjak, and established a new, separate sanjak with its seat in Foča, the Sanjak of Herzegovina.

The very last remnants of the Bosnian state were these stretches of land held by Vlatko in Hum, while he moved his residence to his last capital, Novi. He also gave up his agreement with Ottomans, after just a few years or so, just about the same time when his younger brother, Stjepan, assumed highest office of the Ottoman navy as Ahmed Pasha Hercegović (around 1473) in Istanbul. After his marriage in 1474, he reconciled with his older brother Vladislav.
Just before the death of Sultan Mehmed II, Vlatko tried one more push to the heart of Bosnia, but abandoned by his allies his venture ended in disaster, after which he completely and finitely withdraw to his fortress in Novi.

== Fall ==
These frequent attacks by Vlatko, and the death of Mehmed II, prompted new sultan, Bayezid II, to decide to annex Novi and its harbor, along with whatever territory that remained. In November 1481, Ajaz-Bey of the Sanjak of Herzegovina besieged Novi, however, just before 14 December 1481 Vlatko gave up resisting, and agreed with the Ottomans to move with his family to Istanbul. Ajaz-Bey captured it probably at the end of January 1482. Now the entire territory of Herzegovina was reorganized into the already established Sanjak of Herzegovina with the seat in Foča, later in 1580, becoming one of the sanjaks of the Bosnia Eyalet. This signified the ultimate disappearance of what was the last remaining independent instance of the medieval Bosnian state.

== Family ==
His father Stjepan married three times and had four children with his first wife Jelena, who was mother of Vlatko and his siblings.

Vlatko's siblings were older sister, Katarina, who was the oldest, older brother Vladislav, and younger Stjepan, who was the youngest and who converted to Islam in 1470 after which he took the name Hersekzade Ahmed Pasha and was five-time grand vizier of the Ottoman Empire.

His father's second wife, a Catholic princess Barbara, gave birth to at least two children, a son (1456), a short-lived child whose name is not known, and daughter Mara, but no other information exists about these children.

=== Ancestry ===
Ancestors of Vlatko Hercegović

16. Vuk Kosača
8. Hranja Vuković Kosača; Duke of Bosnia
4. Vukac Hranić Kosača
9. Anka
2. Stjepan Vukčić Kosača; Duke of Saint Sava
5. Katarina
1. Vlatko Hercegović
24. Stracimir Balšić; Lord of Zeta
12. Đurađ II; Lord of Zeta
25. Milica Mrnjavčević
6. Balša III; Lord of Zeta
26. Lazar Hrebeljanović; Prince of Serbia
13. Jelena Lazarević
27. Milica Nemanjić
3. Jelena Balšić
14. Koja Zaharia
7. Bolja Zaharia
30. Lekë Dukagjini
15. Boža

== Bibliography ==
- Beldiceanu-Steinherr, Irène; Bojović, Boško I. (1993). "Le traité de paix conclu entre Vlatko et Mehmed II" (PDF). Balcanica (24): 75–86. Archived from the original (PDF) on 9 March 2022.
- Bojović, Boško I. (1998). Raguse (Dubrovnik) et L'Empire Ottoman (1430-1520): Les actes imperiaux ottomans en vieux-serbe de Murad II a Selim Ier. Paris: Association Pierre Belon. ISBN 978-2-910860-06-6.
- Ćirković, Sima (1964a). Herceg Stefan Vukčić-Kosača i njegovo doba (in Serbian). Naučno delo SANU.
- Ćirković, Sima (1964). Историја средњовековне босанске државе [History of the medieval Bosnian state] (in Serbian). Srpska književna zadruga.
