= Vladislav Hercegović =

15th century Bosnian nobleman

- Grand Duke of Bosnia
- Full name: Vladislav Hercegović Kosača
- Born: 1426
- Died: 1489 (aged 62–63); Rab
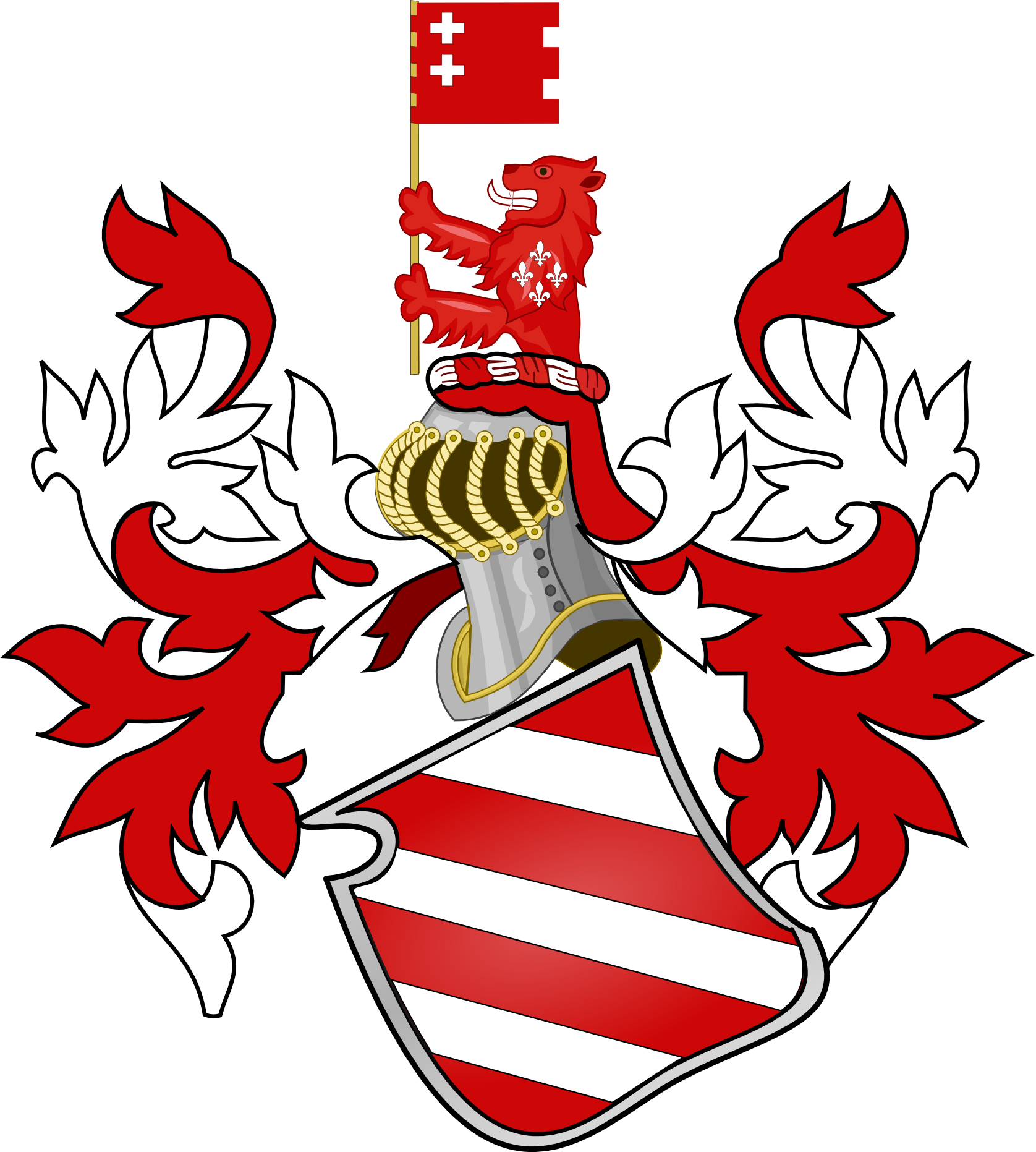
- Noble family: Kosača noble family
- Father: Stjepan Vukčić Kosača
- Mother: Jelena Balšić

Vladislav Hercegović (Serbian Cyrillic: Владислав Херцеговић; 1426 or 1427 – 1489) was the oldest son of Stjepan Vukčić. The Kosača noble family held lands in the region known as Humska zemlja, later named Herzegovina.

Unlike his father, who quarreled with the Bosnian King Stjepan Tomaš for years, Knez Vladislav was loyal to the Bosnian throne.

== Citizenship of Ragusa ==
He became citizen of the Republic of Ragusa by the charter dated 30 October 1435. It was customary for the republic to grant all the major Bosnian nobility a status of citizenry and republic's nobility, granting them a palace and a refuge in case of need in Dubrovnik. The City Council granted his father Stjepan and his brother Vlatko citizenship by the same charter.

== Political and military career ==
During his father's reign Vladislav is known to have interfered with his affairs. During Second Konavle War and infighting, when in 1451, his father Stjepan Vukčić attacked the Republic of Ragusa in Konavle and laid siege to Dubrovnik, he conspired with Dubrovnik and Duke of Hum, Ivaniš Vlatković. The first trace of secret negotiations with Knez Vladislav is found in a letter from Dubrovnik to their negotiator dated July 23. In the last days of July or the first days of August, Vladislav expressed desire to make an alliance with Dubrovnik against his father, expecting the city to help him with money and troops. Moreover, Vladislav advocated that Dubrovnik make an alliance with his lord, King Thomas, and that he also be given help. From another letter by Dubrovnik, written in 1459, it is clear that the initiative that despot and King Thomas strike together against the Herceg came from Herceg's wife Jelena and Knez Vladislav.

=== Clan infighting ===
The relations in Herceg's family greatly influenced the opening of the infighting and Vladislav's rebellion, but also whole conspiracy against Herceg. The reason behind infighting can be found in a writing by the Italian chronicler Gaspare Broglio Tartaglia da Lavello, who says that Herzeg's envoys brought from Florence a young Sienese girl, intending to present her to his son, Vladislav. This was probably Jelisaveta, a young concubine to which Herceg fell in love and even imprisoned his son for a short time to have her for himself. Herceg's wife Jelena was also looking to take revenge on her husband for this. Vladislav, certainly under her influence, decided to rebel against his father. The alliance was forged in greatest secrecy, and sealed by charter of alliance, written, signed and issued by Vladislav in Drinaljevo župa near Tođevac fortress, on August 15.

On 29 March 1452, Vladislav openly declared his hostility against his father. His mother and grandmother stood by him. He was joined by Duke Ivaniš Vlatković with his brothers. The rebellion was well organized, so that on the first day, Vladislav and his allies occupied a significant territory with equally significant fortresses such as the capital Blagaj, Tođevac, Vratar on the Sutjeska, two cities at the Neretva bridge, Vjenačac in Nevesinje, Imotski, Kruševac and Novi in Luka, and a little later Ljubuški. Already in April, it was expected that King Tomas will come to Hum to help the efforts. King came with his vassal Petar Vojsalić and a military contingent in mid-April, when allied forces including Vladislav, Vlatkovićs and all the other petty Hum's nobility came together against Herceg and his younger son Vlatko.

The alliance was very successful, especially because Hum's general population was extremely dissatisfied with Stjepan's rule, the king and despot were in agreement and the Porte, on huge Herceg disadvantage, was neutral; only Venice remained friend with him during the war, and he had his local vassals. Though, at the beginning Herceg Stjepan could count on Pavlović's troops, because they were too weak after Radisav's death and had signed peace agreement with him, but being loyal king's men Ivaniš and Petar II Pavlović restrained themselves from participating actively.

So, the alliance could have defeated Stjepan if quarrel had noted broke out over the city of Blagaj, which King Tomas demanded from Vladislav, but which he did not agree to relinquish. After several unsuccessful negotiations this led the king to leave the alliance, and the Ragusans, disappointed by the king's decision, withdrew their fleet from the Neretva and mercenaries too. Thus abandoned, Vladislav and the Vlatković brothers lost the upper hand on the battlefield. In summer 1452 preparations for negotiation to stop the war slowly started. In February 1453 negotiations began, most likely on Herceg's initiative. But before its start, during preparations for negotiations in late summer and fall 1452, Ragusans tried to persuade young Vladislav, now duke, not to enter negotiations with his father and younger brother, claiming that Stjepan had promised to exact revenge on Vladislav and his brother "thinking the same", citing Herceg's letters to Venice as evidence. However, since they could not completely prevent the negotiations between Vladislav and Herceg, the Dubrovnik government wanted to at least find a way to influence them. In January 1453, Ragusans expressed to Papal legat their commitment to peace but rejected possibility of separate peace between any party involved. With some doubt over the exact date and place, Herceg Stjepan eventually forgave his eldest son, his wife, and Hum's nobility for rebelling against him, and everything was sealed with a treaty in a ceremony held in Pišče on the Piva, on the road to the Sokol Fortress, between 1 and 5 June, with the confirmation and vouching by the djed of the Bosnian Church and its 12 clerics, called strojniks, and led by gost Radin, who served as witnesses. It was also stipulated that the Herceg must not take any action against dukes Ivaniš Vlatković and Sladoje Semković, and knezs Đurađ Ratković and Vukašin Sanković, nor any of the nobles who were not part of the family's immediate circle, until the suspicions were first checked by the djed of the Bosnian church, twelve strojniks, among which a place was reserved for Radin Gost.

After 1453 he was frequently in the service of the Ottoman Empire, the Republic of Venice and the Hungarian-Croatian king Matthias Corvinus. Corvinus granted him the forts of Veliki Kalnik and Mali Kalnik near Križevci.

As an Ottoman vassal (after 1469) he took part in the capture of the town of Počitelj on the river Neretva in 1472 and in battles against the Vlatković's of that region. He reconciled with his younger brother, Vlatko, and around 1480 defeated he retreated to Novi. When Novi was captured by the Ottomans in the year 1482, Vladislav retreated to the island of Rab under Venetian rule where he would die.

== Last years and succession ==
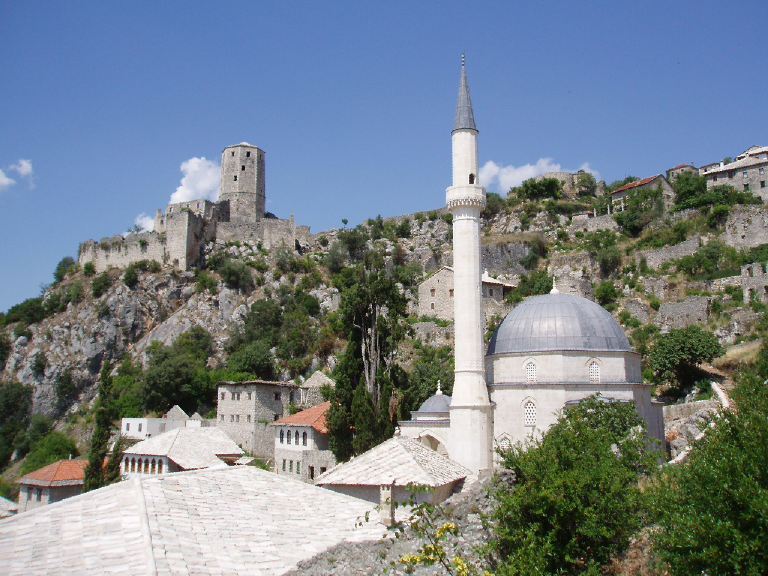
Počitelj, built by Bosnian king Tvrtko I sometime in 1383, first mentioned in 1444, fell in 1471.

After the fall of Bosnia in 1463, Herceg Stjepan Vukčić lived for another three years during which the kingdom was dismantled, all of which he blamed on Vladislav. Soon after taking the hearth of the Kingdom of Bosnia in 1463, Mahmud Pasha turned to herceg's lands and besieged Blagaj, after which Stjepan conceded a truce while ceding all of his lands north of Blagaj to the Ottomans. On 21 May 1466 in Novi, in front of his closest courtiers summoned as witnesses, a court chaplains gost Radin and monk David, and a chamberlain Knez Pribislav Vukotić, Stjepan, old and terminally ill, dictated his last words recorded in a testament, and leaving Vladislav out of it he blamed fall of Bosnia on him, stating that Vladislav had "brought the great Turk to Bosnia to the death and destruction of us all". The duke died the following day.

=== Brothers reconcile ===
The only real remnants of the independent Bosnian state were last stretches of land held by Vlatko in Hum. He moved his residence to his last capital Novi and after a few years gave up his peace agreement with the Ottomans. After his marriage in 1474, Vlatko reconciled with his older brother Vladislav. Around the same time, late 1473 to early 1474, his younger brother Stjepan departed for Istanbul, where he converted to Islam as Ahmed Pasha Hercegović, after which he would hold various top positions in his 40-year career, including the highest function in the Ottoman navy.

Just before death of Sultan Mehmed II, Vlatko tried one more push to the heart of Bosnia but was abandoned by his allies. He completely withdrew to his fortress in Novi. The death of Mehmed II prompted the new Sultan Bayezid II to overrun Novi, its harbor and the remaining Bosnian territory. In November 1481, Ajaz-Bey of the Sanjak of Herzegovina besieged Novi but just before 14 December 1481, Vlatko ceased resisting and agreed with the Ottomans to move with his family to Istanbul. Now the entirety of Herzegovina was reorganized into the already established Sanjak of Herzegovina with the seat in Foča, and later, in 1580, would become one of the sanjaks of the Bosnia Eyalet. This signified the disappearance of the last-remaining independent point of the Bosnian state.

== Family ==
His father Stjepan married three times and had four children with his first wife Jelena, who was mother of Vladislav and his siblings.

Vladislav's siblings were older sister Katarina, who was the oldest, and younger brothers Vlatko and Stjepan, who was the youngest and who converted to Islam in 1470, took the name Hersekzade Ahmed Pasha and was five-time grand vizier of the Ottoman Empire.

His father's second wife, a Catholic princess Barbara, gave birth to at least two children, a son (1456), a short-lived child whose name is not known, and daughter Mara, but no other information exists about these children.

He married Anna Kantakouzene, one of the five known daughters of George Palaiologos Kantakouzenos, in 1453 or 1454. A surviving letter from King Alfonso of Naples and Aragon to Vladislav's father Stjepan dated 5 April 1455 congratulates the latter that two of his sons are married: one to the niece of the Despot of Serbia (who would be Anna Kantakouzene), and the other to the sister of the Count of Cilli. At some time after this Vladislav sent Anna with his son Balša and niece Mara to live in the Republic of Ragusa (modern Dubrovnik). His son, Balša, was the titular "Duke of St. Sava".

== Descendants ==
- Balša
- Petar
  - Matija
    - Miklos
      - Ivan
      - Andrija
      - Tomaš
      - Unknown Daughter
    - Unknown Daughter
  - Vladislav Hercegović

Ancestors of Vladislav Hercegović

16. Vuk Kosača
8. Hranja Vuković Kosača; Duke of Bosnia
4. Vukac Hranić Kosača
9. Anka
2. Stjepan Vukčić Kosača; Duke of Saint Sava
5. Katarina
1. Vladislav Hercegović
12. Đurađ II; Lord of Zeta
6. Balša III; Lord of Zeta
13. Jelena Lazarević
3. Jelena Balšić
7. Bolja Zaharia

== Bibliography ==
- Bašagić, Safvet-beg (1900). Kratka uputa u prošlost Bosne i Hercegovine, od g. 1463–1850 [A brief lesson to the past of Bosnia and Herzegovina, from 1463–1850] (in Serbo-Croatian). Vlastita naklada. OCLC 31285183.
- Ćirković, Sima (1964a). Herceg Stefan Vukčić-Kosača i njegovo doba [Herceg Stefan Vukčić-Kosača and his time] (in Serbian). Naučno delo SANU. OCLC 4864621.
- Ćirković, Sima (1964). Историја средњовековне босанске државе [History of the medieval Bosnian state] (in Serbian). Srpska književna zadruga. OCLC 494551997.
- Ćorović, Vladimir (1940). Хисторија Босне [History of Bosnia] (in Serbian) (Посебна изданја - Друштбени и историски списи - Књига 53 ed.). Belgrade: Српска краљевска академија – Штамиарија "Слово" (Глас српски – reprint 1999). ISBN 978-86-7119-161-6.
- Šanjek, Franjo, ed. (2005). Fenomen "Krstjani" u Srednjovjekovnoj Bosni i Humu: Zbornik Radova (in Serbo-Croatian). Sarajevo: Institut za istoriju u Sarajevu. ISBN 978-9985-9642-5-5.
  - Puljić, Ivica. "Crkvene prilike u zemljama Hercega Stjepana Vukčića Kosače [Confessional circumstances in the lands of Herceg Stjepan Vukčić Kosača]". In Šanjek (2005), pp. 239–269.
- Vego, Marko (1957). Naselja bosanske srednjevjekovne države [Settlements of the Bosnian medieval state] (in Serbo-Croatian). Sarajevo: Svjetlost. OCLC 9379295.
- Vrankić, Petar (5 October 2017). "Stjepan/Ahmedpaša Hercegović (1456.?-1517.) u svjetlu dubrovačkih, talijanskih i osmanskih izvora". Hercegovina: Časopis za kulturno i povijesno naslijeđe (in Croatian) (3): 9–67. doi:10.47960/2712-1844.2017.3.9. ISSN 2566-3429.
