= Duchy of Saint Sava =

1448–1482 polity in Southeast Europe

- 1448–1482
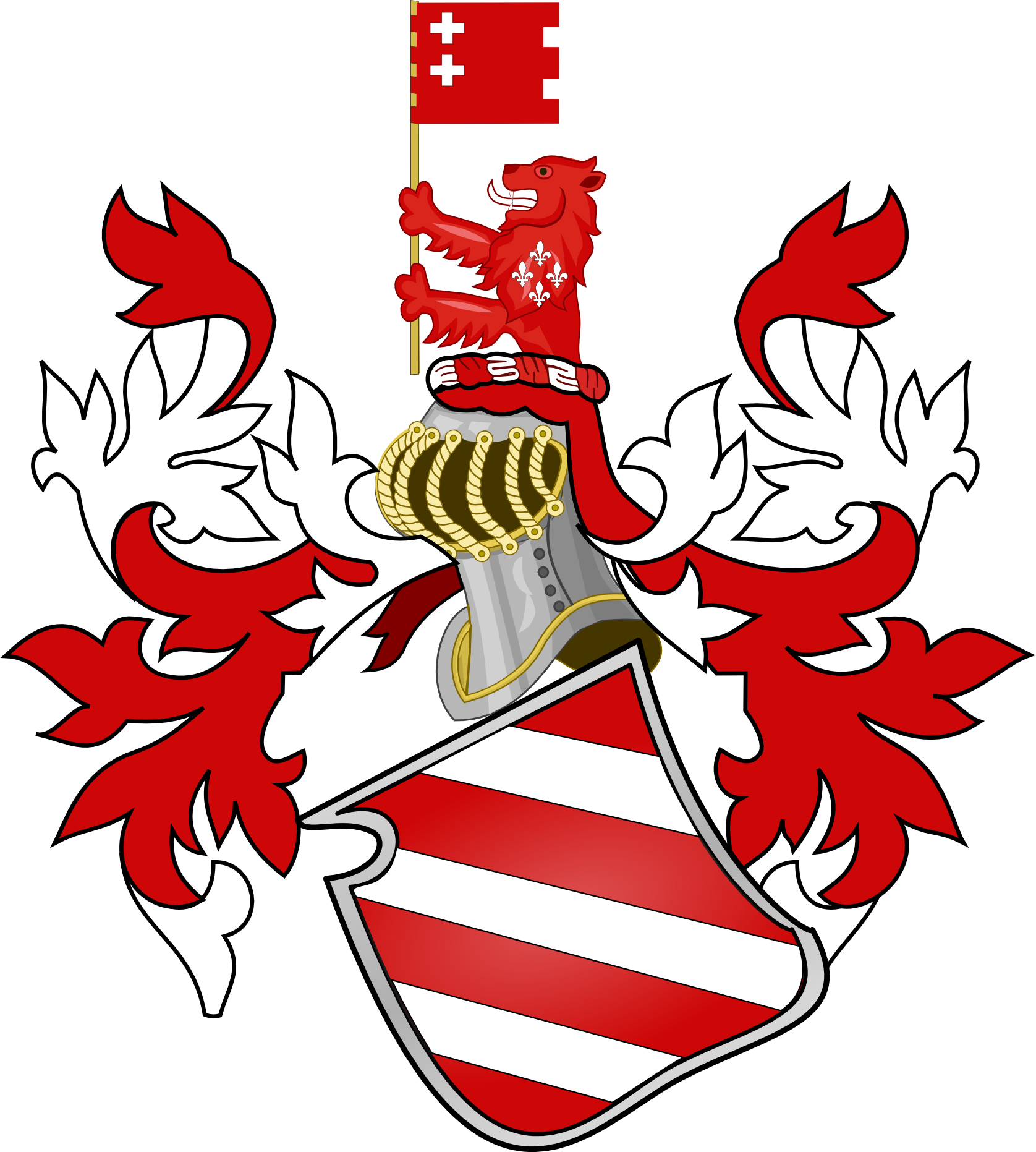
- Flag Coat of arms

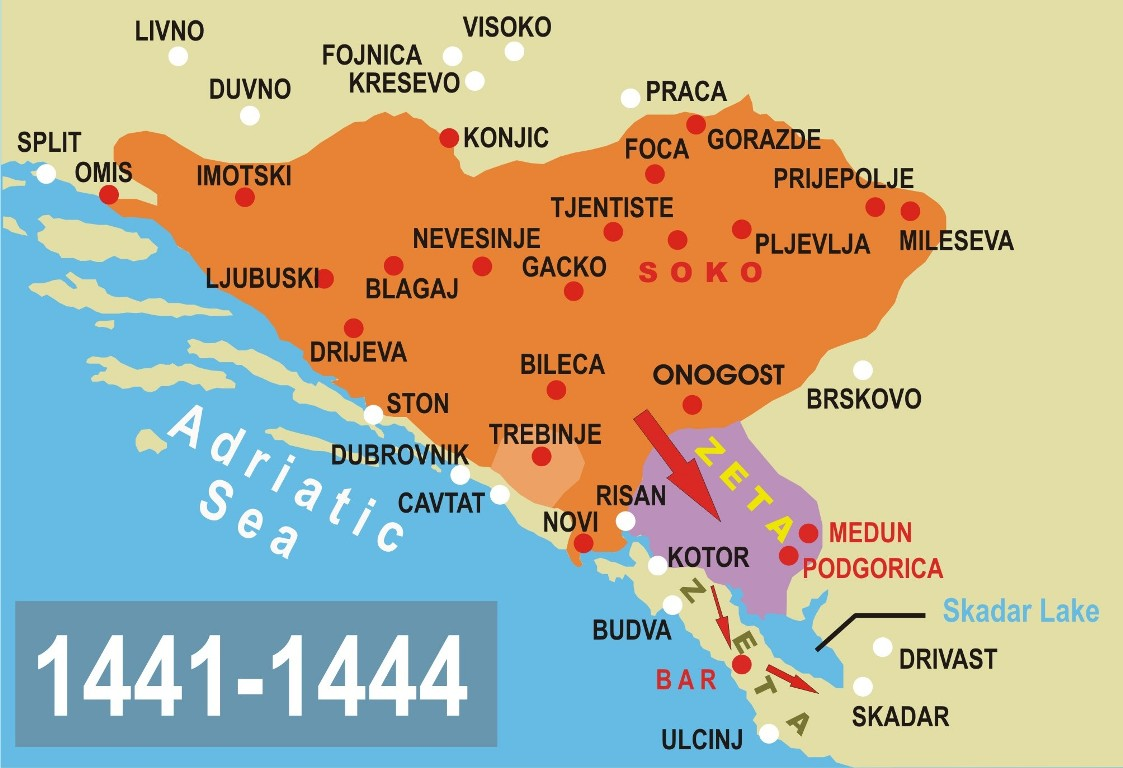
- Feudal domains of Stjepan Vukčić Kosača, in the years preceding his acquisition of the ducal title
- Capital: Blagaj
- Largest city: Herceg-Novi
- Government: Feudal state
- Historical era: Late Medieval
  - Established: 1448
  - Disestablished: 1482
| Preceded by | Succeeded by |
| Humska zemlja | Sanjak of Herzegovina |
- Today part of: Bosnia and Herzegovina; Croatia; Montenegro; Serbia

The Duchy of Saint Sava (Serbo-Croatian: Vojvodstvo Svetog Save / Војводство Светог Саве) (Note: Some sources also refer to it as the Dukedom of Saint Sava. Another rendering of its name is the Herzegovina of Saint Sava (Serbo-Croatian: Hercegovina Svetog Save / Херцеговина Светог Саве). The latter is also attested in various maps dating from 1513 to 1818.) was a late medieval polity in southeastern Europe, that existed from 1448 up to 1482, when it was absorbed by the Ottoman Empire. It was founded and controlled by the Kosača noble family, whose rulers held the title Duke of Saint Sava (Serbo-Croatian: Vojvoda Svetog Save / Војвода Светог Саве). (Note: Another rendering of its name is the Herzeg of Saint Sava (Serbo-Croatian: Herceg Svetog Save / Херцег Светог Саве).) Their domains included southern parts of modern-day Bosnia and Herzegovina, extending to southern parts of modern-day coastal Croatia, northwestern Montenegro and southwestern Serbia. Its founder, Stjepan Vukčić Kosača (duke since 1448), titled himself Herceg of Saint Sava, a title which would later give rise to the new name to the region: Herzegovina, and will be also used by the Ottomans as Hersek Sancağı (Sanjak of the Herzeg), designating the Sanjak of Herzegovina.

In various sources, and historiographical traditions, the name of the duchy is recorded or used in several forms, varying mostly in the way the name of Saint Sava is spelled in different languages: Latin: Ducatus Sancti Sabbae, Italian: Ducato di Santo Sabba, German: Herzogtum des hl. Sava. In English historiography, forms such as the "Duchy of Saint Sava" or "Dukedom of Saint Sava" were used already since the 1700s and further on.

== History ==
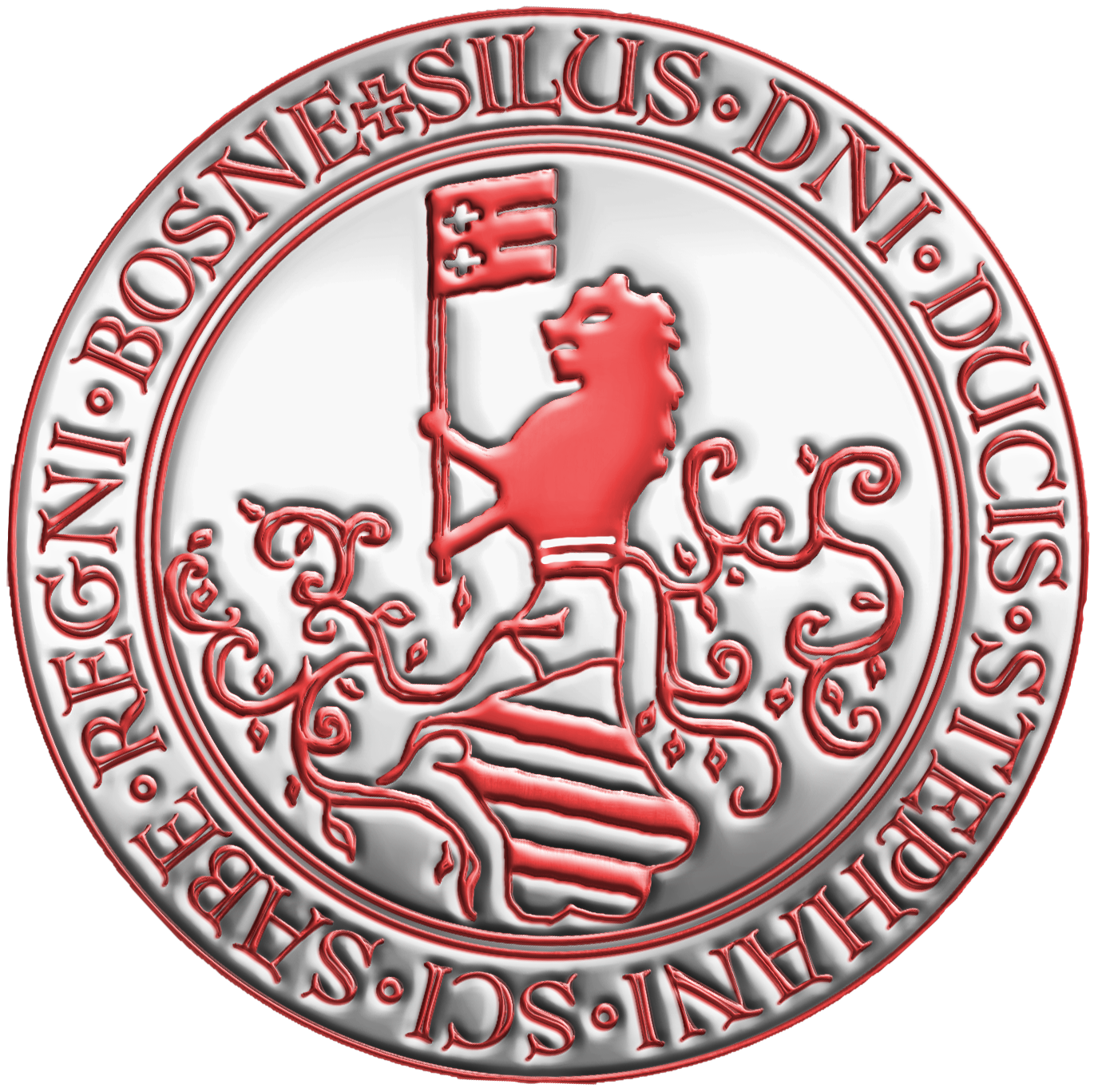
Grand seal of Stjepan Vukčić Kosača, the first Duke od Saint Sava (Latin: Sigillum ilustrissimi Domini Ducis Stephani Sancti Sabe et Regni Bosne)

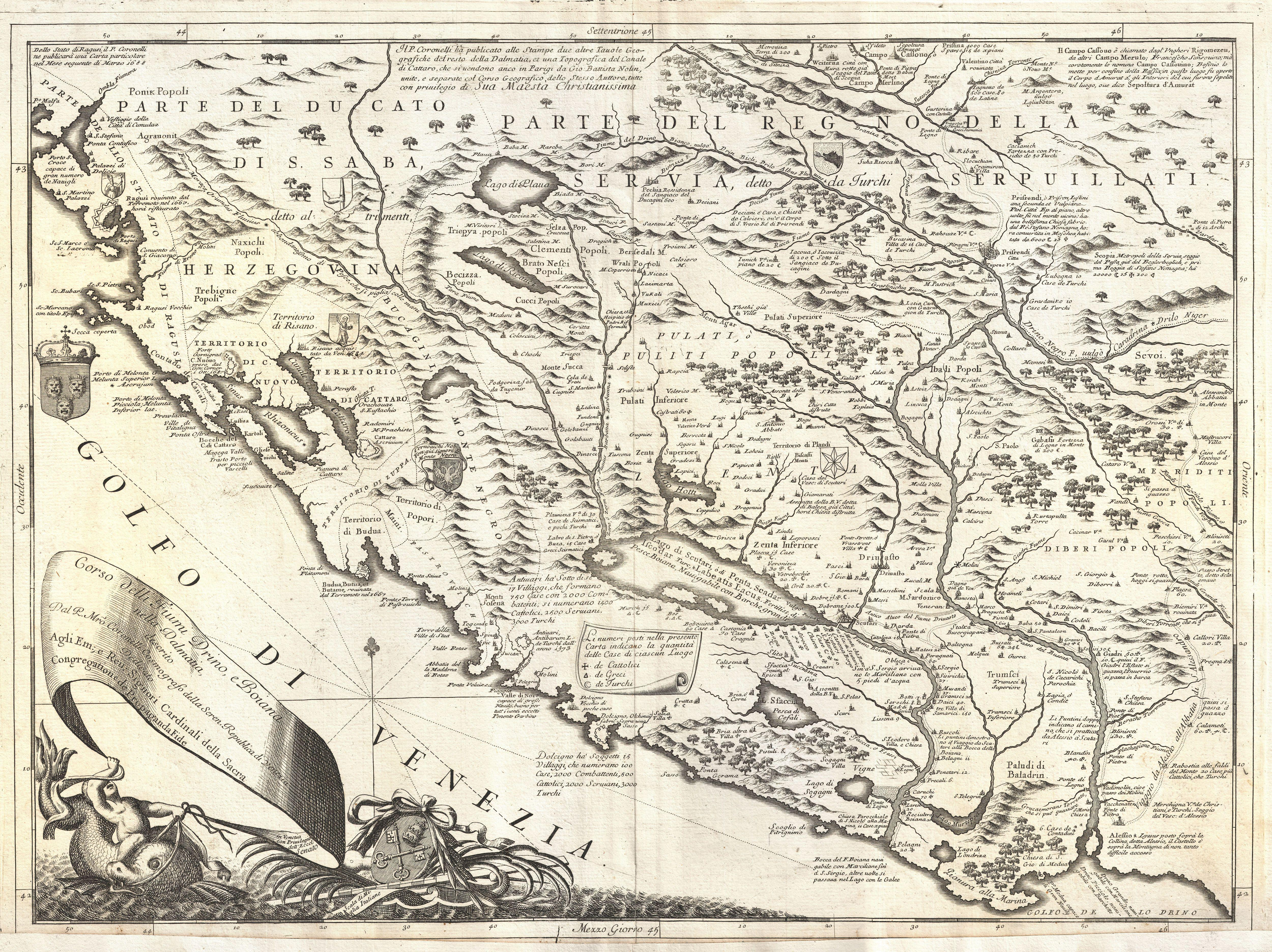
Coronelli map (1690), designating the region as: „Parte del Ducato di S. Saba”

Until the 14th century, most regions of the later Duchy of Saint Sava were part of medieval Serbia, and then became part of the medieval Bosnia. By the beginning of the 15th century, the Kosača noble family gained prominence and power in those southeastern parts of the Kingdom of Bosnia. Since 1435, the family was headed by Stjepan Vukčić Kosača, a mighty feudal lord and veliki vojvoda of Bosnia, whose relations with Bosnian kings became turbulent, due to his high ambitions. On 15 February 1444, Stjepan signed a treaty with Alfonso V of Aragon, who was also the King of Naples, becoming his vassal in exchange for the king's help against Stjepan's main enemies, namely King Stephen Thomas of Bosnia, and the Republic of Venice.

In order to emphasize his feudal rank among other lords and consolidate his feudal domain, Stjepan decided to take a new title. Since the autumn of 1448, he started to style himself as "Herceg" (from German title Herzog or Duke). Initially, he was mentioned in one document as "Herceg of Hum and Primorje" (1448), but from the beginning of 1449 and further on, he styled himself as "Herceg of Saint Sava" (Latin: Dux Sancti Sabae), after Saint Sava (†1236), the first Serbian Archbishop. The title "Duke of Saint Sava" had considerable symbolic value, because Saint Sava's relics, which were located in monastery Mileševa within Stjepan's domains, were considered miracle-working by people of all Christian faiths in the region.

Ducal rank, that was assumed by Stjepan in 1448, was positioned highly in European medieval hierarchy, ranking just below the royal title. Duke Stjepan thus gained a higher position in feudal hierarchy, striving to gain more independence from the Bosnian king. Stjepan's domain covered various regions, from the river Lim in the east, to beyond the river Neretva in the west, and upper Drina in the north, encompassing several historical territories (zemlja and župa), such as: Hum, Primorje, Travunija, Onogošt, Drina, Polimlje and others. At its greatest territorial extent (c. 1465), under Duke Stjepan, the Duchy included southern parts of modern-day Bosnia and Herzegovina, and extended to parts of modern-day coastal Croatia, northwestern Montenegro and southeastern part of modern Serbia. At its highest point, the Duchy covered the entire southern half of the Bosnian Kingdom.

Stjepan also improved his relations with the Serbian Despot Đurađ Branković, and already in 1448-1449 they formed an alliance, and conquered Višegrad and Srebrenica from the Bosnian crown. In 1450, upon the conclusion of the peace treaty between the Venetian Republic and the Kingdom of Naples, Duke Stjepan was listed among the concluding parties on the side of King Alfonso of Naples, while King of Bosnia was listed among allies of Venice.

In 1451, Stjepan attacked the Republic of Ragusa in order to gain the region of Konavle, and laid siege to the city of Dubrovnik. He had earlier been made a Ragusan nobleman and, consequently, the Ragusan government now proclaimed him a traitor. A reward of 15,000 ducats, a palace in Dubrovnik worth 2,000 ducats, and an annual income of 300 ducats was offered to anyone who would kill him, along with the promise of hereditary Ragusan nobility which also helped hold this promise to whoever did the deed. An offer was also made to the Ottomans, by Duke's enemies, to buy out Stjepan's domain for 50,000 ducats, and additional problems occurred within ducal family, since his eldest son Vladislav attempted to establish himself in the western parts of ducal domains, in the region of Hum. Stjepan and Vladislav were reconciled in 1453, and the peace with Dubrovnik was concluded in 1454.

In the same year (1454), Duke Stjepan renewed his alliance with King Alfonso of Naples, who issued a charter (June 1) confirming all of Stjepan's ducal domains and mutual obligations. In the royal charter, Stjepan was addressed as: "illustris Stephani ducis Sancte Save Domini terre Hulminis maritimarum partium ac comiti Drine et magni vayvode Regni Boccine".

Religious situation in Stjepan's domains was complex, since his subjects belonged to three Christian denominations (Eastern Orthodoxy, Roman Catholicism, and the Bosnian Church). Prominent members of his court were metropolitan David of Mileševa (of the Serbian Patriarchate of Peć), and gost Radin (of the Bosnian Church). Ethnic composition of Stjepan's wast domains was also complex, encompassing local South Slavic populations, and also romance Vlachs.

In 1463, the Ottomans conquered the Bosnian Kingdom, thus endangering all of the neighbouring regions, including the Duchy of Saint Sava. In 1465, Ottomans conquered most of the eastern part of Stjepan's domains, organizing the captured territories as the Vilayet of the Herceg (Vilâyet-i Hersek) within the Sanjak of Bosnia, and later (c. 1470) reorganizing the same region as a separate Sanjak of Herzegovina.

Stjepan Vukčić died in 1466, and was succeeded by his sons Vladislav Hercegović and Vlatko Hercegović. The elder brother ruled in western regions, while the younger governed over the remaining southeastern parts, centered in Herceg-Novi. By 1467, much of the Duchy was occupied by the Ottoman governor of the Sanjak of Bosnia, Isa Bey Ishaković. As a result, Vladislav left for Hungary and received an estate in Slavonia. In 1470, Vlatko concluded a treaty with the sultan, becoming Ottoman vassal and receiving back some previously lost regions (Trebinje and Popovo polje), thus securing the existence of his domain, which was gradually reduced to the region of Novi.

During the following years, Duke Vlatko tried to secure his remaining ducal domains by balancing between Venetians and Ottomans, while his youngest brother Stjepan converted to Islam (c. 1474) and consequently achieved a prominent career in Ottoman service, becoming known as Ahmed Pasha Hersekzade.

=== Fall of the Duchy ===
Since the end of the Ottoman-Venetian war (1463–1479), duke Vlatko was left without further support from his main ally, the Venetian Republic. As a result of Ottoman expansion during the previous years, territory of the formerly wast Duchy of Saint Sava was gradually reduced to its southeastern regions around Novi. In attempt to gain support against Ottomans, duke Vlatko tried to strengthen his ties with the Kingdom of Hungary and the Kingdom of Naples, thus provoking new sultan Bayezid II (1481–1512). In autumn 1481, Ottoman forces invaded the Duchy and besieged Novi, that was defended by duke Vlatko, aided by allied forces sent by Hungarian king. Outnumbered by invading forces, defenders resisted until December/January (1481/1482) when Novi fell into Ottoman hands. Thus, the last remnant of the Duchy of Saint Sava was finally conquered, and incorporated into the Sanjak of Herzegovina. In order to demonstrate clemency, sultan granted some inland possessions to duke Vlatko, who lived under Ottoman rule for several years, but later moved under Venetian protection and settled in the island of Rab.

=== Legacy ===
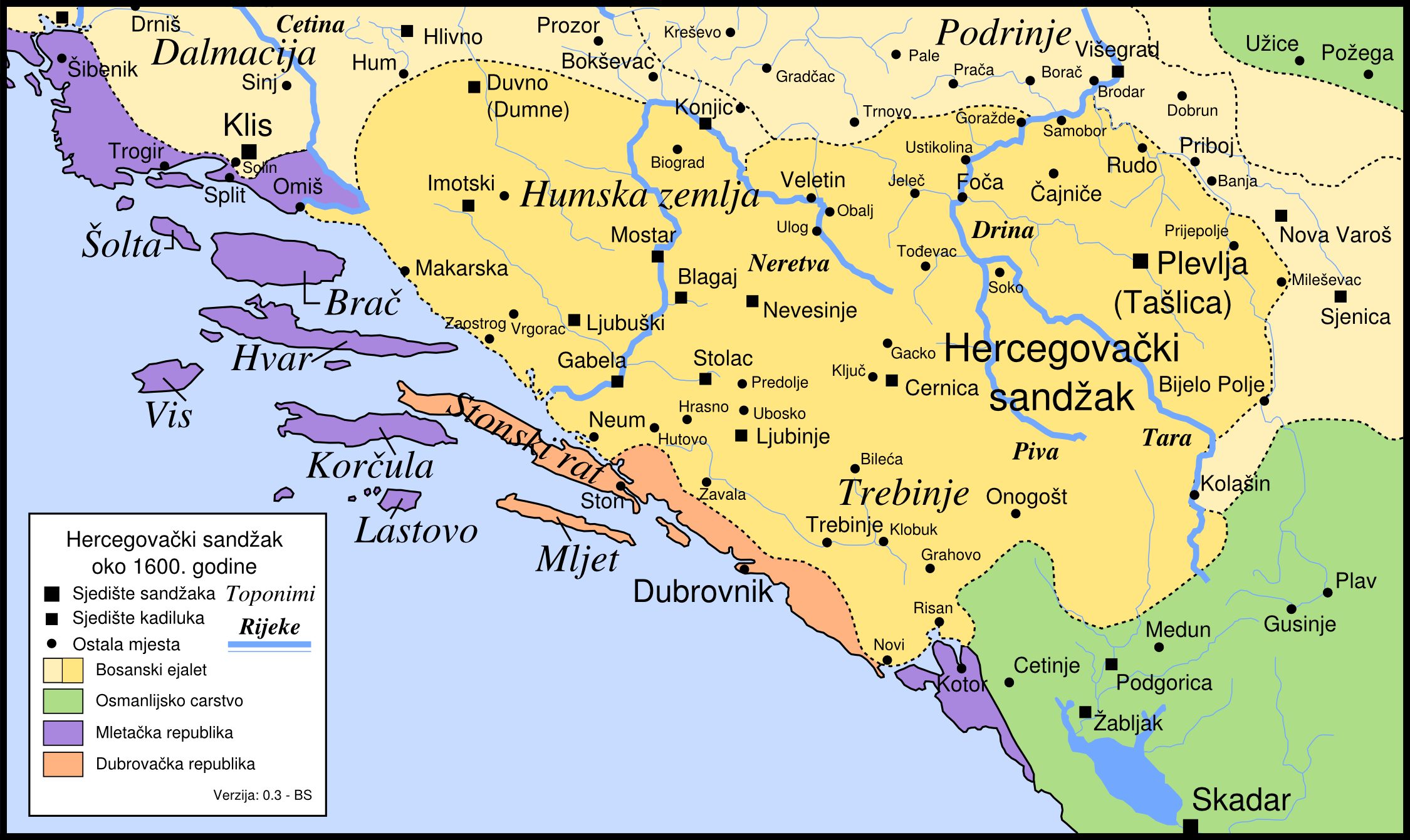
Sanjak of Herzegovina, created after Ottoman gradual conquest (from 1465 to 1482) of the Duchy of Saint Sava.

Title of the Duke (Herceg) of Saint Sava would later give the name to the historical region of Herzegovina (hercegovina / herceštvo = Land of the Herceg), as the Ottomans used the term "Hersek Sancağı" (Sanjak of the Herzeg) for the newly formed Sanjak of Herzegovina.

In spite of the fall (1482), traditions related to the Duchy of Saint Sava continued to play significant role in regional geopolitics, particularly in later Venetian and Habsburg plans to reconquer the territory from the Ottomans, thus resulting in frequent mentions of the former Duchy in 16th-18th century sources, (Note: In February 1688, Holy Roman Emperor Leopold I was urged by cardinal Pietro Marcellino Corradini to grant imperial protection to twelve prominent Bosnian Muslim families since they "would be followed [by others] in Serbia, in the Duchy of St. Sava [Hercegovina] and other lands adjacent to this Republic, as well as in other dependencies of the kingdom of Hungary". That December, Leopold issued a protective patent "for all inhabitants of the Dukedom of St. Sava or Herzegovina".) as well in early cartography. Both exiled dukes, Vladislav and Vlatko, and their descendants who lived in Hungary and Venice, kept the title "Duke of Saint Sava" and used it until the extinction of the Kosača family in the 17th century.

== Rulers ==
- Stjepan Vukčić Kosača, 1448–1466
- Vlatko Hercegović, 1466–1482
- Balša Hercegović (in title)

== See also ==
- Zachlumia
- Old Herzegovina
- Ottoman conquest of Bosnia

== Sources ==
- Aličić, Ahmed S., ed. (1981). Herzegovina. Zagreb: Privredni vjesnik.
- Ančić, Mladen (2015). "Can Bosnia do Without Herzegovina?". Croatian Studies Review. 11: 13–80.
- Anđelić, Pavao (1970). Srednjovjekovni pečati iz Bosne i Hercegovine [Medieval Seals from Bosnia and Herzegovina]. Sarajevo: Akademija nauka i umjetnosti Bosne i Hercegovine.
- Atanasovski, Veljan (1979). Пад Херцеговине [The Fall of Herzegovina]. Београд: Историјски институт.
- Beldiceanu-Steinherr, Irène; Bojović, Boško I. (1993). "Le traité de paix conclu entre Vlatko et Mehmed II" (PDF). Balcanica (24): 75–86. Archived from the original (PDF) on 9 March 2022.
- Bataković, Dušan T. (1996). The Serbs of Bosnia & Herzegovina: History and Politics. Paris: Dialogue. ISBN 9782911527104.
- Bataković, Dušan T., ed. (2005). Histoire du peuple serbe. Lausanne: L’Age d’Homme. ISBN 9782825119587.
- Behmen, Goran (2009). "The Character of Law and Authority in Medieval Bosnia" (PDF). Survey: Periodical for Social Studies. 50 (1): 197–212.
- Ćirković, Sima (1964a). Историја средњовековне босанске државе [History of the Medieval Bosnian State]. Београд: Српска књижевна задруга.
- Ćirković, Sima (1964b). Херцег Стефан Вукчић-Косача и његово доба [Duke Stefan Vukčić-Kosača and his era]. Београд: Научно дело.
- Ćirković, Sima (1982). "Пад Босне и покушаји отпора турском освајању" [The fall of Bosnia and attempts to resist the Turkish conquest]. Историја српског народа [History of the Serbian people]. Vol. 2. Београд: Српска књижевна задруга. pp. 390–402.
- Ćirković, Sima (1987). "Милешева и Босна" [Mileševa and Bosnia]. Милешева у историји српског народа [Mileševa in the History of the Serbian People]. Београд: САНУ. pp. 137–143. ISBN 978-86-7025-005-5.
- Ćirković, Sima (1991). "Сведочење карте" [The testimony of te map]. Србија и суседне земље на старим географским картама [Serbia and the neighbouring countries on early maps]. Београд: САНУ. pp. 11–18.
- Ćirković, Sima (2004). The Serbs. Malden: Blackwell Publishing. ISBN 9781405142915.
- Ćorović, Vladimir (1940). Хисторија Босне [History of Bosnia]. Београд: Српска краљевска академија.
- Ćošković, Pejo (2005). Crkva bosanska u XV. stoljeću [The Bosnian Church in the 15th century] (PDF). Sarajevo: Institut za istoriju.
- Dinić, Mihailo (1940). "Земље Херцега Светога Саве" [The Lands of the Duke of Saint Sava]. Глас Српске краљевске академије. 182: 151–259.
- Djukanović, Bojka (2023). Historical Dictionary of Montenegro. Lanham, Maryland: Rowman & Littlefield. ISBN 978-1-53813-915-8.
- Dőry, Franciscus, ed. (1976). Decreta Regni Hungariae: Gesetze und Verordnungen Ungarns: 1301-1457. Budapest: Magyar Országos Levéltár kiadványai. ISBN 978-963-05-0524-6.
- Echard, Laurence (1700) [1691]. A Most Compleat Compendium of Geography General and Special Describing all the Empires, Kingdoms, and Dominions in the Whole World (5th ed.). London: John Nicholson.
- Edwards, Lovett F. (1971). Yugoslavia. New York: Hastings House.
- Evans, Arthur J. (1876). Through Bosnia and the Herzegóvina on Foot During the Insurrection (1st ed.). London: Longmans, Green and CO.
- Fine, John Van Antwerp Jr. (1991) [1983]. The Early Medieval Balkans: A Critical Survey from the Sixth to the Late Twelfth Century. Ann Arbor, Michigan: University of Michigan Press. ISBN 0472081497.
- Fine, John Van Antwerp Jr. (1994) [1987]. The Late Medieval Balkans: A Critical Survey from the Late Twelfth Century to the Ottoman Conquest. Ann Arbor, Michigan: University of Michigan Press. ISBN 0472082604.
- Fine, John Van Antwerp Jr. (2007) [1975]. The Bosnian Church: Its Place in State and Society from the Thirteenth to the Fifteenth Century. London: Saqi Books.
- Fresne, Charles du (1746). Illyricum vetus & novum, siue, Historia regnorum Dalmatiae, Croatiae, Slavoniae, Bosniae, Serviae, atque Bulgariae. Typis Hæredum Royerianorum.
- Isailović, Neven (2015). "Дипломатичке особености владарских и великашких исправа уочи и након пада средњовековне босанске државе" [Diplomatic characteristics of the documents of rulers and nobles before and after the fall of the medieval Bosnian state]. Пад Босанског краљевства 1463. године [The fall of the Bosnian kingdom in 1463]. Београд: Историјски институт. pp. 29–86.
- Isailović, Neven (2020). "Partnerstvo u pokušaju - temeljne značajke odnosa Alfonsa V. i Stjepana Vukčića Kosače" [An Attempted Partnership - The Fundamental Features of the Relationship between Alfonso V and Stjepan Vukčić Kosača]. Radovi Zavoda za hrvatsku povijest Filozofskoga fakulteta Sveučilišta u Zagrebu. 52 (3): 37–68. doi:10.17234/RadoviZHP.52.30.
- Ivić, Aleksa (1905). "Кад је и од кога је Стјепан Вукчић добио титулу "Херцег од св. Саве"?" [When and from whom did Stjepan Vukčić receive the title "Duke of St. Sava"?]. Летопис Матице српске. 230 (2): 80–94.
- Ivić, Pavle, ed. (1995). The History of Serbian Culture. Edgware: Porthill Publishers. ISBN 9781870732314.
- Kozličić, Mithad; Bratanić, Mateo; Uglešić, Sanda (2011). "The demarcation between Croatia and Bosnia and Herzegovina in the Una region from the 17th to the 20th century according to original cartographic material". Geoadria. 16 (1): 27–91. doi:10.15291/geoadria.269.
- Krekić, Bariša (1978). "Contributions of Foreigners to Dubrovnik's Economic Growth in the Late Middle Ages". Viator. 9: 385–404. doi:10.1525/9780520327320-019. ISBN 9780520327320.
- Laszowski, Emilij (1898). "Prilog rodopisu hercega sv. Save: Hrvatska grana hercega sv. Save" [Contribution to the Genealogy of the Dukes of St. Sava: Croatian branch of the Dukes of St. Sava]. Vjesnik Hrvatskoga arheološkoga društva. 3 (1): 25–29.
- Miller, William (1923). "The Balkan States, II: The Turkish Conquest (1355-1483)". The Cambridge Medieval History. Vol. 4. Cambridge: University Press. pp. 552–593.
- Nicol, Donald M., ed. (1997). Theodore Spandounes: On the Origins of the Ottoman Emperors. Cambridge: Cambridge University Press. ISBN 9780521585101.
- Orbini, Mauro (1601). Il Regno de gli Slavi hoggi corrottamente detti Schiavoni. Pesaro: Apresso Girolamo Concordia.
- Osborne, Richard Horsley (1967). East-Central Europe: An Introductory Geography. New York City: Praeger. OCLC 404372.
- Pálosfalvi, Tamás (2014). "The Noble Elite in the County of Körös (Križevci) 1400-1526". Monography. Budapest: MTA Bölcsészetudományi Kutatóközpont Történetudományi Intézet.
- Pálosfalvi, Tamás (2016). "A szentszávai hercegek Magyarországon" [The Dukes of Saint Sava in Hungary]. Hercegek és hercegségek a középkori Magyarországon [Dukes and Duchies in Medieval Hungary]. Székesfehérvár: Városi Levéltár és Kutatóintézet. pp. 111–125.
- Pálosfalvi, Tamás (2018). From Nicopolis to Mohács: A History of Ottoman-Hungarian Warfare, 1389-1526. Leiden: Brill. ISBN 9789004375659.
- Paulus, Christof; Weber, Albert (2020). "Venedig und der "wilde Osten": Wissen, Rang und Interessenräume im ausgehenden Mittelalter" (PDF). Quellen und Forschungen aus Italienischen Archiven und Bibliotheken. 100: 208–260. doi:10.1515/qufiab-2020-0013.
- Pitcher, Donald E. (1972) [1968]. An Historical Geography of the Ottoman Empire: From Earliest Times to the End of the Sixteenth Century. Leiden: Brill.
- Poparić, Bartul (1895). Hercezi Svetoga Save (50 godina povjesti Hercegovačke) [Dukes of Saint Sava (50 years of the history of Herzegovina)]. Split: Zannoni.
- Rimac, Marko (2022). "Early Ottoman Expansion to Poljica: Some Considerations on the Social Structure and Political Diversification of the Elite" (PDF). Historical Searches. 21: 87–121.
- Seton-Watson, Robert W. (1931). "The Role of Bosnia in International Politics (1875-1914)". Proceedings of the British Academy. 17: 335–368.
- Simon, Alexandru (2023). "Views from across the Adriatic: The Royal Crowns of Bosnia and Wallachia in the mid-1470s" (PDF). Studia historica Adriatica ac Danubiana. 16 (1–2): 7–20.
- Šabanović, Hazim (1959). Bosanski pašaluk: Postanak i upravna podjela. Sarajevo: Naučno društvo Bosne i Hercegovine.
- Špoljarić, Luka (2019). "The Renaissance Papacy and Catholicization of the Manichean Heretics: Rethinking the 1459 Purge of the Bosnian Kingdom". Global Reformations: Transforming Early Modern Religions, Societies, and Cultures. London & New York: Routledge. pp. 153–175. doi:10.4324/9780429399152-9.
- Stanojević, Ljiljana (2004). The First Serbian Uprising and the Restoration of the Serbian State. Belgrade, Serbia and Montenegro: Historical Museum of Serbia. ISBN 978-8-67025-371-1.
- Thallóczy, Ludwig (1914). Studien zur Geschichte Bosniens und Serbiens im Mittelalter. München-Leipzig: Duncker & Humblot.
- Zirdum, Andrija, ed. (1977). Filip Lastrić: Pregled starina Bosanske provincije. Sarajevo: Veselin Masleša.
- Ursinus, Michael (2007). "Mostar". Historic Cities of the Islamic World. Leiden-Boston: Brill. ISBN 978-9-0041-5388-2.
- Vego, Marko (1957). Naselja bosanske srednjevјekovne države [Settlements of the Bosnian medieval state]. Sarajevo: Svjetlost.
- Vego, Marko (1982). Postanak srednjovjekovne bosanske države [Emergence of the medieval Bosnian state]. Sarajevo: Svjetlost.
- Vemić, Mirceta; Lović, Suzana (2014). Božić, Sofija (ed.). European Maps of Kosovo and Metohija as the Primary Core of Old Serbia from the 16th to the 20th Century. Belgrade, Serbia: Serbian Academy of Sciences and Arts, Institute of Slavistics. ISBN 978-8-67005-125-6.
- Vrankić, Petar (2017). "Stjepan/Ahmed-paša Hercegović (1456.?-1517.) u svjetlu dubrovačkih, talijanskih i osmanskih izvora" [Stjepan/Ahmed Pasha Hercegović (1456?-1517) in the light of Ragusan, Italian and Ottoman sources]. Hercegovina: Časopis za kulturno i povijesno naslijeđe. 3 (3): 9–67. doi:10.47960/2712-1844.2017.3.9.
- Zlatar, Zdenko (1992a). Our Kingdom Come: The Counter-Reformation, the Republic of Dubrovnik, and the Liberation of the Balkan Slavs. Boulder, Colorado: East European Monographs. ISBN 9780880332392.
- Zlatar, Zdenko (1992b). Between the Double Eagle and the Crescent: The Republic of Dubrovnik and the Origins of the Eastern Question. Boulder, Colorado: East European Monographs. ISBN 978-0-8803-3245-3.
- Zlatar, Zdenko (1995). The Slavic Epic: Gundulić's Osman. Lausanne, Switzerland: Peter Lang. ISBN 978-0-82042-380-7.
- Zlatar, Zdenko (2007). The Poetics of Slavdom: The mythopoeic foundations of Yugoslavia. Vol. 2. Lausanne, Switzerland: Peter Lang. ISBN 978-0-8204-8135-7.
