= Hercegović =

Hercegović is a Bosnian surname and may refer to:

- Two sons of Stjepan Vukčić Kosača, a Bosnian duke and member of the Kosača noble family:
  - Vladislav Hercegović (1426–1490), Duke of Saint Sava
  - Stjepan Hercegović (1459–1517), Ottoman grand vizier (better known as Hersekzade Ahmed Pasha)

== See also ==
- Herceg (title)
