= Ljubuški Fortress =

- Herceg Stjepan's Fortress
- Ljubuški, Bosnia and Herzegovina
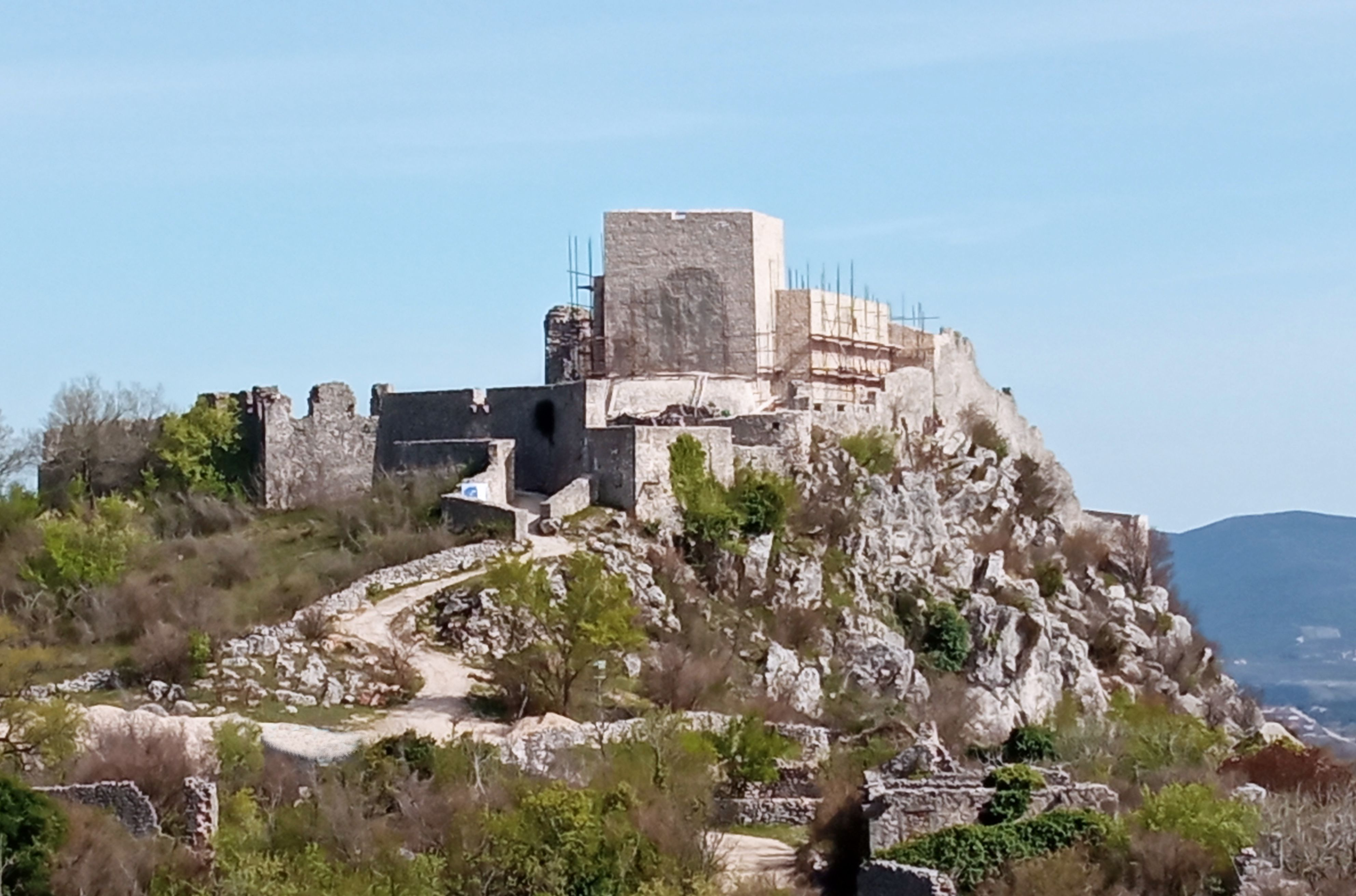
- Ljubuški Fortress

Location
- Coordinates: 43.20132462312455°N 17.55785213454691°E

Site history
- Built: 15th century
- Built by: Stjepan Vukčić Kosača
- Materials: limestone

Garrison information
- Past commanders: Vlatko Hercegović
- Designations

KONS of Bosnia and Herzegovina
- Official name: Old fort of Ljubuški, the architectural ensemble
- Type: Category II monument
- Criteria: A, B, D i., E iii., F ii.iii., G v., I iii.
- Designated: 8 October 2003 (?th session No. 06-6-976/03-2)
- Reference no.: 1844
- State: National Monuments of Bosnia and Herzegovina

Base plane of the Ljubuški Fortress

Ljubuški Fortress, also known as Herceg Stjepan's Fortress (Croatian: Trvđava Herceg-Stjepana) or the Old town of Ljubuški (Croatian: Stari grad Ljubuški) is a medieval fortress in the municipality of Ljubuški, Bosnia and Herzegovina.

== Location ==
The fortress of Herceg Stjepan Vukčić is located on the prominent top of the karstic rocky ridge of the Buturovice hill, which is located at the eastern end of Ljubuško polje. It was built on a solid, rocky position, at 396 meters a.s.l. In the period after the Bosnian War between 1992 and 1996, a macadam road to the foothills was built.

== Historical information ==
In the Middle Ages, Ljubuški was part of the župa of Večenike (Večerić). The fortress belonged to the Herzog of Saint Sava and Grand Duke of Bosnia, Stjepan Vukčić Kosača, and is mentioned in 1452 in connection with the battles between him and his sons, Knez Vladislav and Knez Vlatko. In the same year, Knez Vladislav sided with the Republic of Dubrovnik in the war against his father. Herceg Stjepan eventually took refuge in the fortress in Ljubuški. That year, Vladislav tried to conquer the town of Ljubuški from his father but failed. It was not until 1454 that it was again mentioned in the charter of the Aragonese king Alfonso V as civitas Lublano. It is strange that it is not mentioned in the charters of 1444 and 1448, since all three of these charters list property within the Duke's territory, and it is assumed that it was built somewhere in that period, although it is possible that it was built in 1452.

In 1463, the Ottomans conquered Ljubuški for the first time, but held it only for a month, between June and July, but had to retreat due to insufficient supplies, and Knez Vlatko Hercegović quickly reclaimed the city to his rule. Between 1468 and 1477, the Ottomans definitively conquered Ljubuški. As early as 1477, it was a border fortress with a strong garrison which belonged to the Drina kadiluk. In the contract between the Ottoman Empire and Hungary in 1503, Ljubuški is mentioned as one of the border towns that remains under Ottoman rule. In the vakufnama of Nesuh-age Vučjaković written in February 1565, the city is mentioned as a k'ala (fortress). Nesuh-aga built a mosque in the city. It was mentioned as an independent kadiluk in 1633. In the 18th century, there was a nahiyah Ljubuški in the kadiluk of the same name, and the captaincy of the same name was also founded. The fortress was abandoned in 1835.

== Description ==
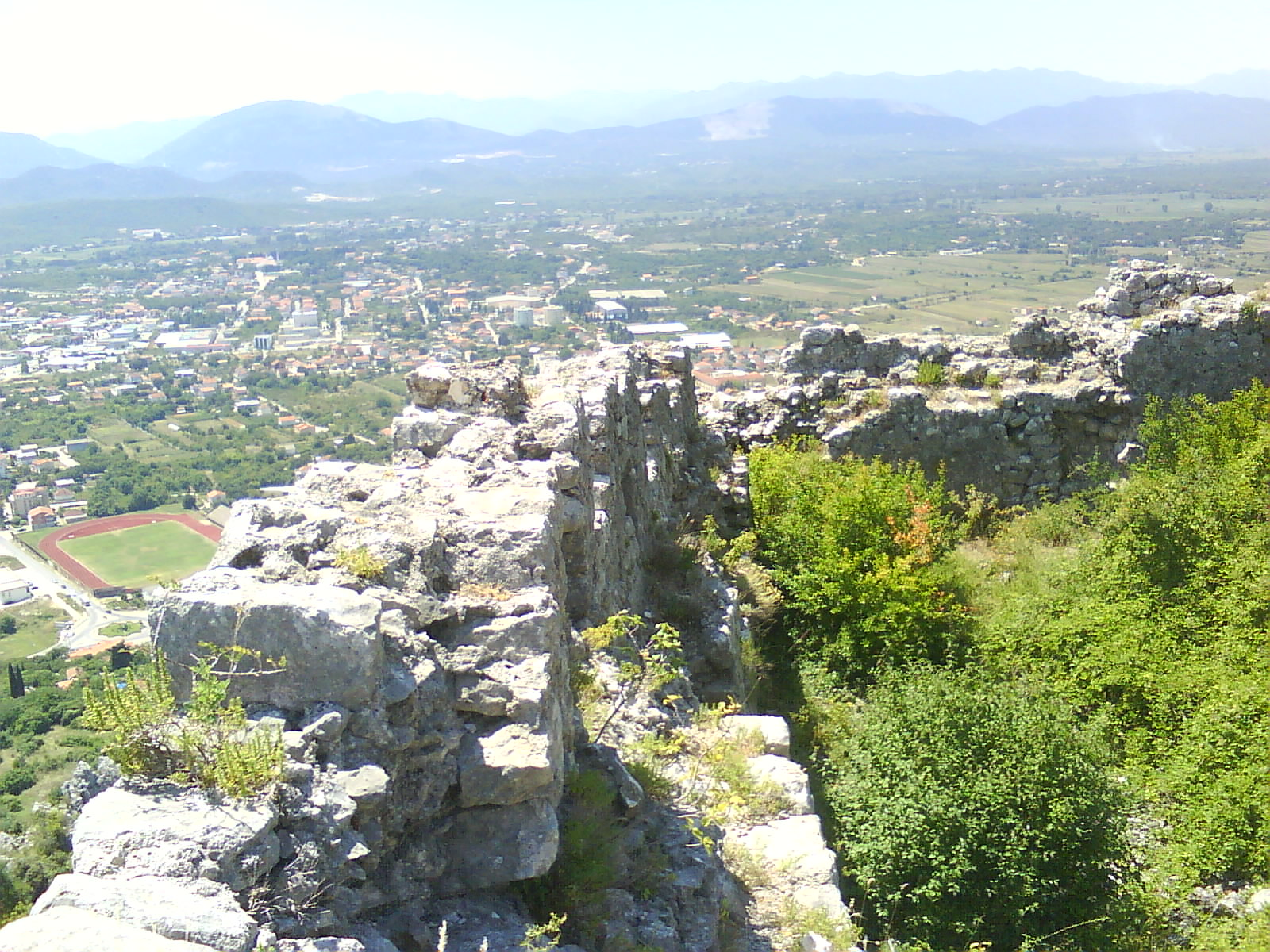
View on Ljubuški town from the fortress

The fortress consists of constructions from two different epochs. The first fortification was created during the medieval Bosnian state, which continued to be developed during the Ottoman period.

Inside the walls there are remains of various buildings, such as watchtower, granary, bakeries, gunpowder mills, and 4 cisterns have been identified, three of which still retain their original shape in the ground.

=== Medieval period ===
The fortress consists of several units. In the northern part, there is an entrance gate and a large lower baily with a tabia, and in the south, the upper baily, divided by a wall. The central part with two massive dominating east-facing towers at the southeast was the central defense point. The western perimeter rampart extends mostly in a calm line, on difficult-to-access, rugged terrain.

The medieval fortress consists of a massive quadrangular tower, called Herceguša, which dominates the fortress and a stable in front of the tower. The tower's external dimensions are 9.7 with 5 meters, with the walls 2 to 4 meters thick. There were loopholes at the top of the tower, which are no longer there. The north wall of the tower has been preserved up to the roof, at around 15 meters. The side walls have largely collapsed, while the southern longitudinal wall was demolished by an earthquake in the 1960s. Along the eastern half of the southern wall of the tower are steps connected to the eastern wall of the enclosure, while the stairs leading to the tower are buried by stones collapsed from the southern wall of the tower during the earthquake. The podgrađe has most likely developed on the Crkvice terrace, which is located under the southern part of the town. A later town developed in the valley west of the fortress.

=== Ottoman period ===
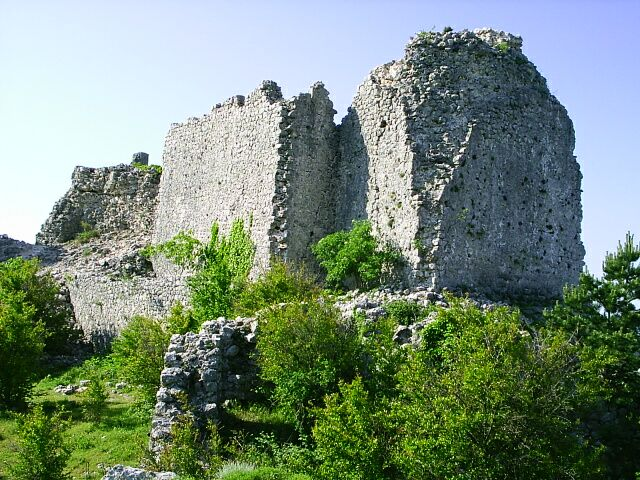
The fortress' massive core.

The Ottoman part of the fortress was built around a medieval, which then became the core of a larger fortress, like an acropolis, surrounded by walls on all sides, this was still central defense point with two dominating massive east-facing towers at the southeast side. The fortress consists of several units. In the northern part, there is an entrance and a large lower corral with a tabia. In the south, the upper corral is divided by a wall. The perimeter walls were built from 1472 until 1565. The base of the fortification is in the form of an irregular polygon. Its length extends 93 meters in the north–south direction, and the average width is 49.5 meters in the east–west direction, with the total area around 3,350 m2.

=== Present condition ===
The walls are preserved in some places between 4 and 12 meters in height. There are many preserved loopholes on the perimeter ramparts. On the northeast is a large outer baily with a tabia, on the south is upper baily, built on rocks. On the northeast are two massive towers

The path leading to the fortress was cobbled. In the northwestern part there are two defensive towers and a cistern of internal dimensions 5.1 with 3.7 meters.

Around 250 meters northwest from the entrance there are ruins of a mid-16th century mosque that was probably built by Nesuhaga Vučjaković. The mosque has a quadrangular base 7 meters in length, the preserved height of the walls is around 4.5 m. The minaret which is completely demolished, was located next on the western corner, and the mihrab, in the form of a simple quadrangular with a height approx. 2 meters and width 1.5 meters, is located in the middle of the southeast wall. Near the northern walls there are the last remains of the cemetery.

The fortress is slowly being repaired

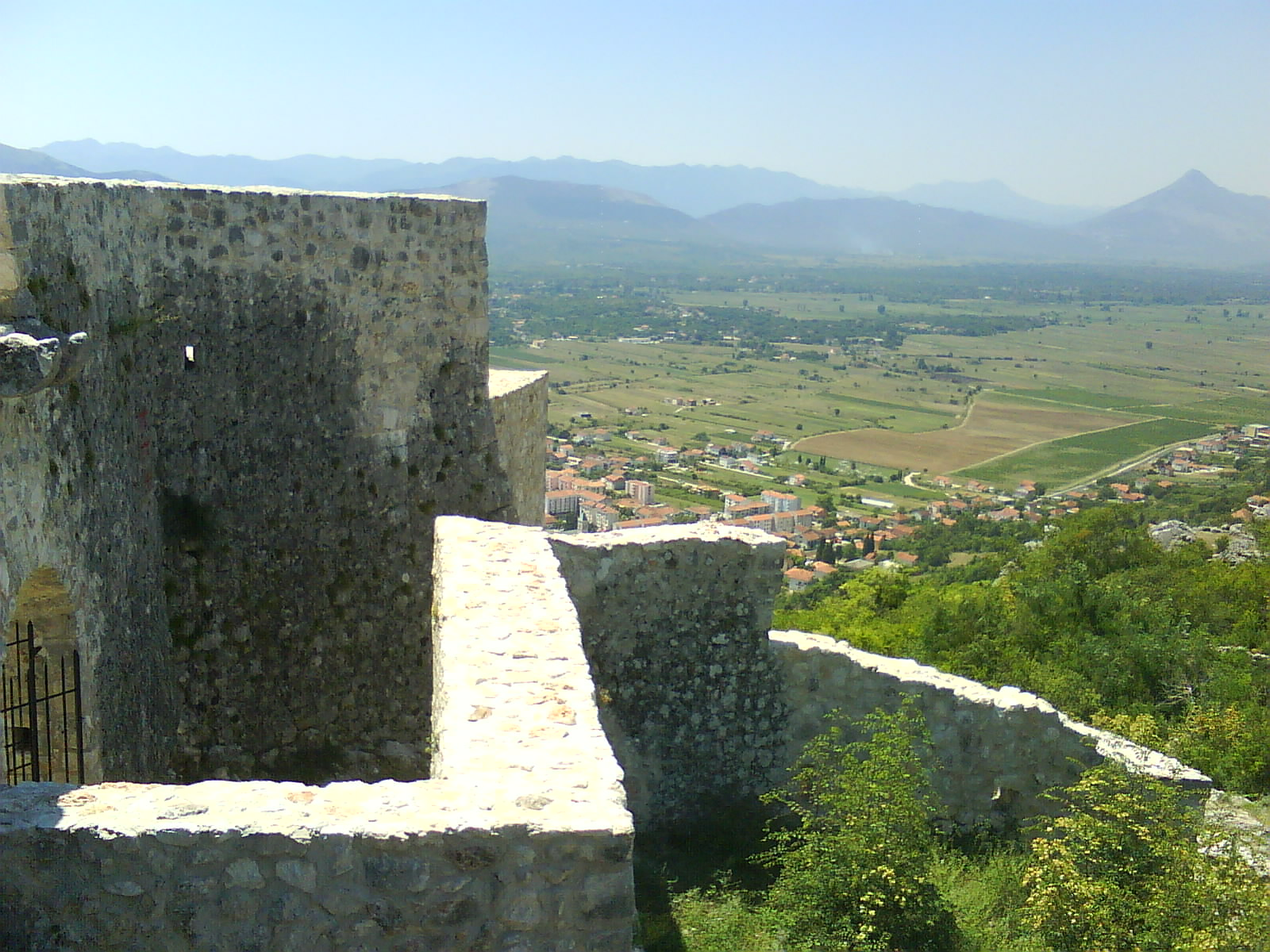

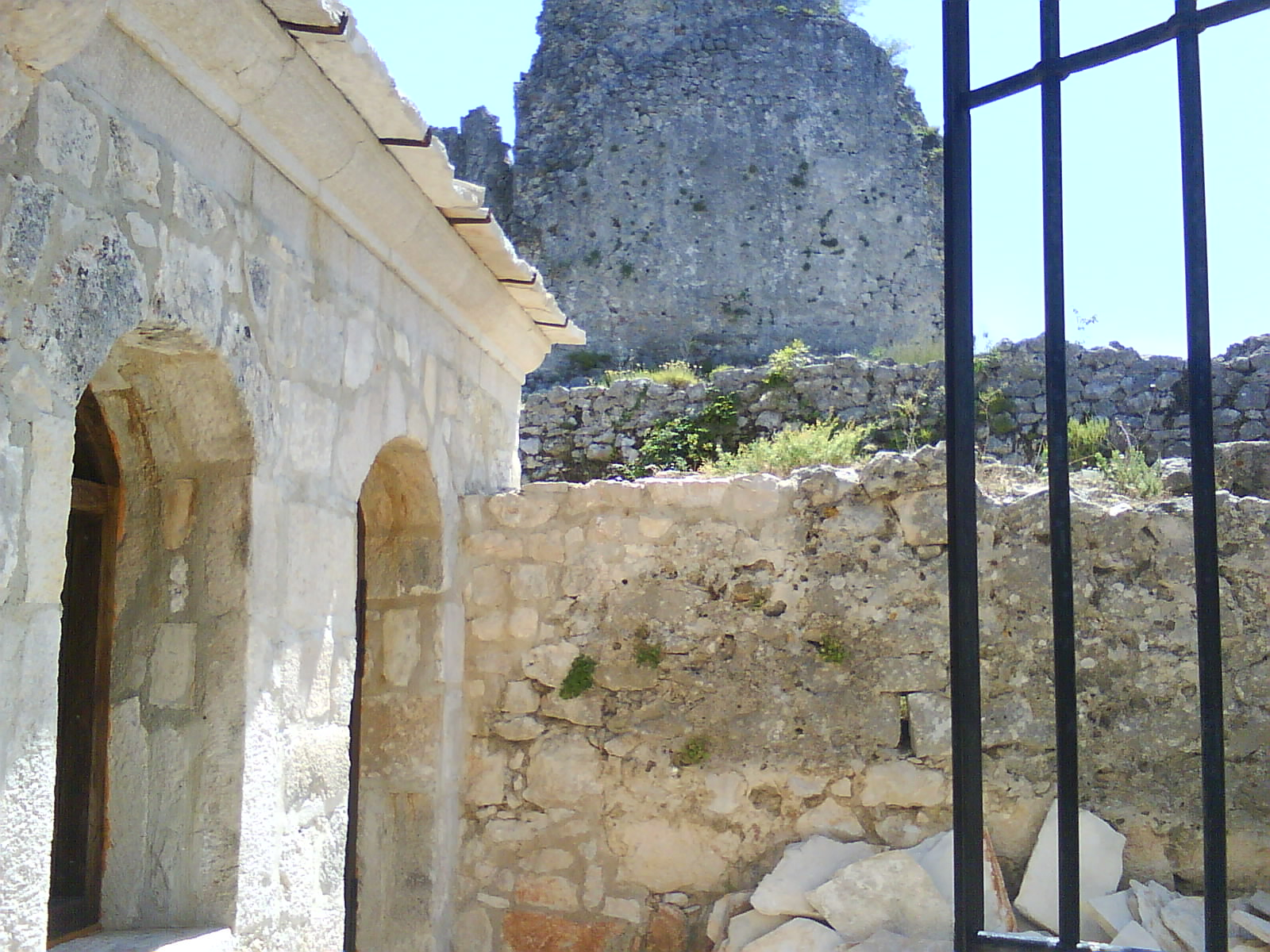

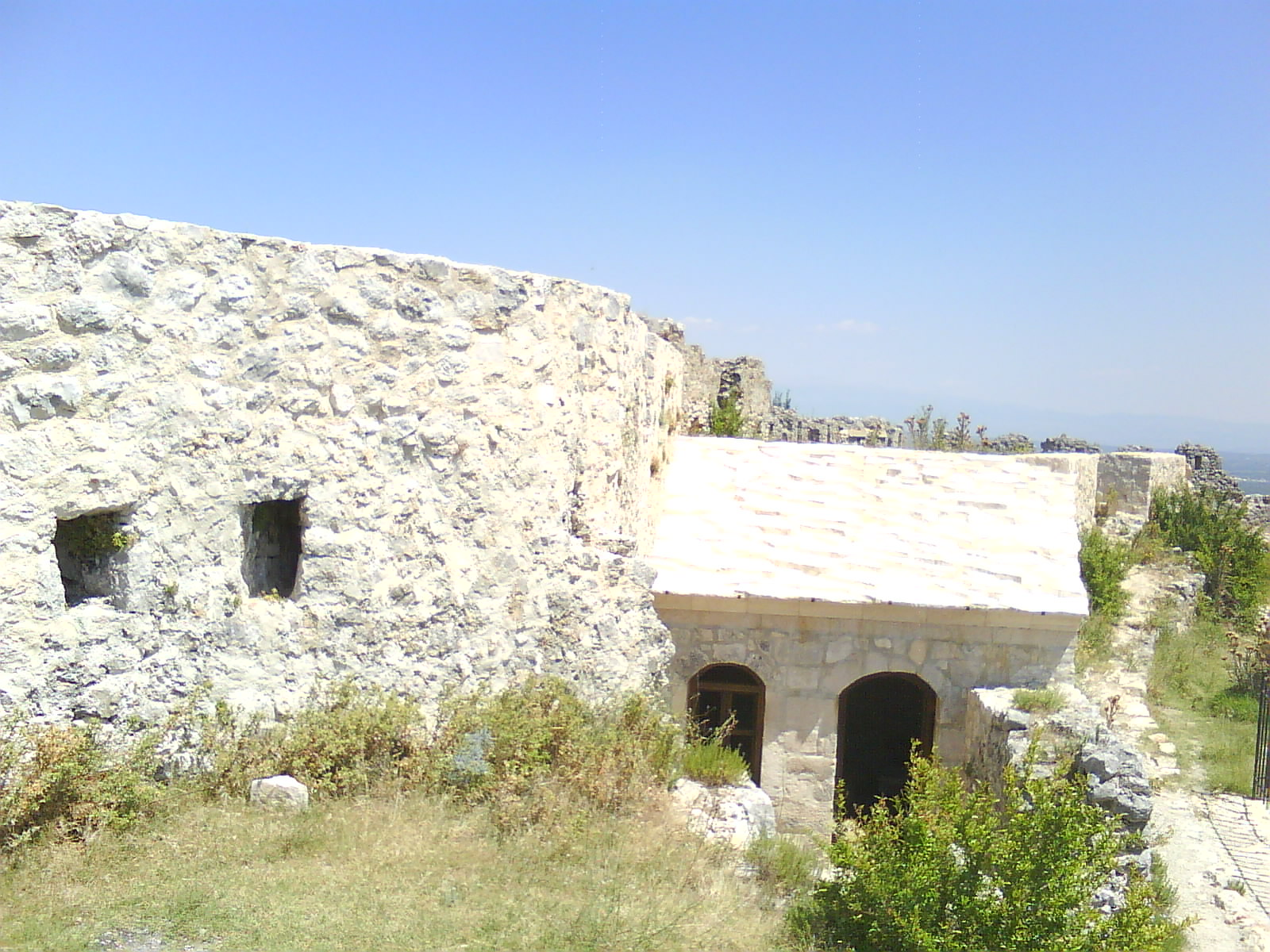

== Heritage protection ==
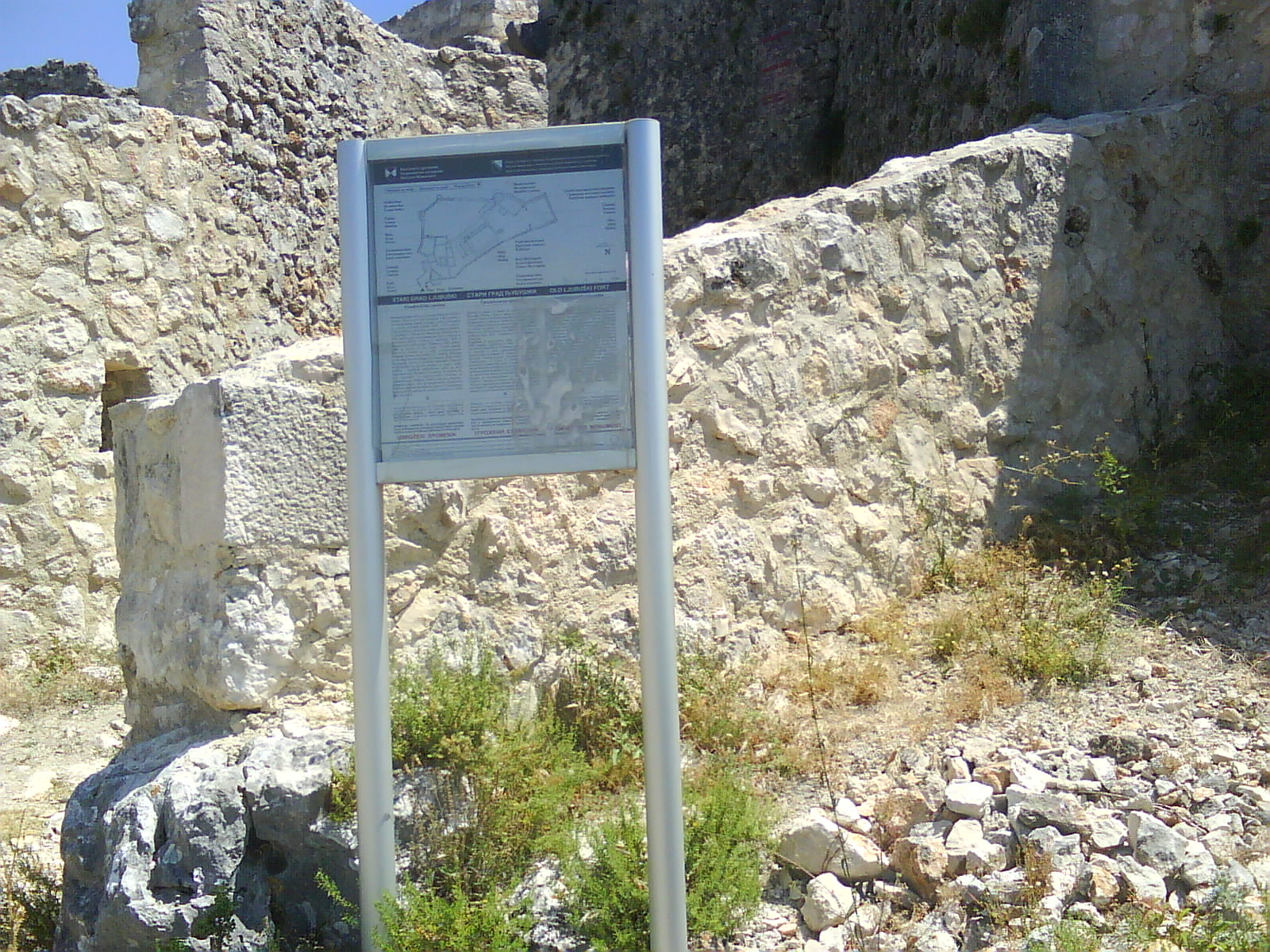
KONS info-board at the protected site, Ljubuški Fortress

On 8 October 2003, the KONS of Bosnia and Herzegovina designated Ljubuški Fortress a National Monument of Bosnia and Herzegovina under the number 06-6-976/03-2.

== See also ==
- Walled city of Jajce

== Literatura ==
- Hamdija Kreševljaković, Hamdija Kapidžić, Stari hercegovački gradovi Naše starine II, Zavod za zaštitu spomenika kulture R BiH, Sarajevo, 1954, 9-21
- Fine, John Van Antwerp Jr. (1994) [1987]. The Late Medieval Balkans: A Critical Survey from the Late Twelfth Century to the Ottoman Conquest. Ann Arbor, Michigan: University of Michigan Press. ISBN 0472082604.
