= Kosača noble family =

Medieval Bosnian noble family

Kosača Косача Kosačić Косачић
- Noble house
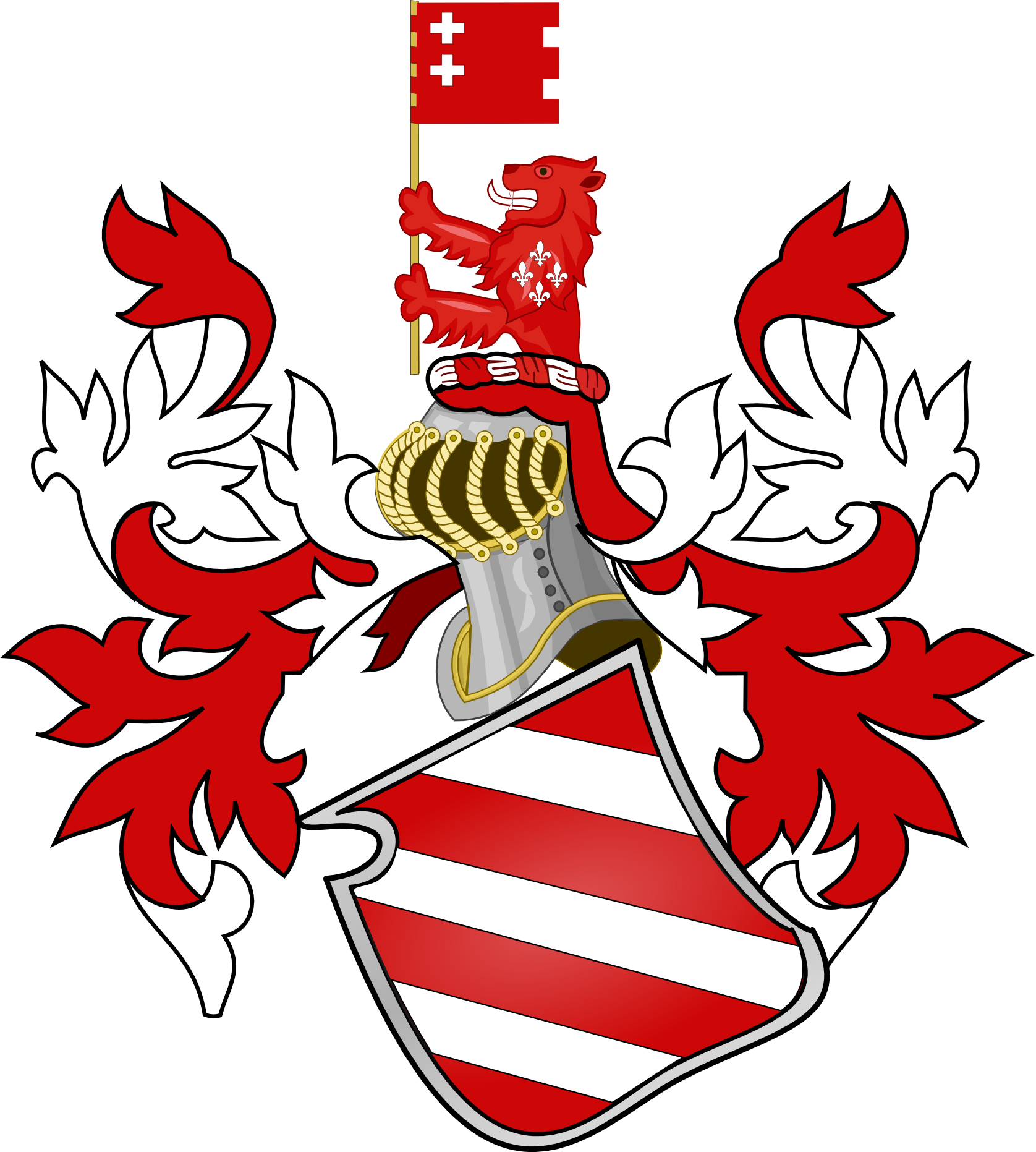
- shield, charge bendy Gules and Argent, helmet, torse and red and white mantling; in crest demi Lion rampant Gules charged with four lilies holding in the paws a Banner of arms Gules flowing to the dexter charged with two cross
- Country: Kingdom of Bosnia; Duchy of Saint Sava; Serbian Empire; Ottoman Empire; Kingdom of Hungary; Republic of Venice
- Origin: Eastern Bosnia near Rudine Upper Drina
- Founded: first half of the 14th century
- Founder: Vuk Kosača
- Final ruler: Vlatko Hercegović
- Titles: knyaz; vojvoda; herceg; bey; special titles: Grand Duke of Bosnia (Veliki Vojvoda Bosanski); Herzog (Duke) of Hum and the Coast; Herzog of Saint Sava; Grand Vizier; Grand Admiral
- Estates: Gornje Podrinje or Gornja Drina (Upper Drina) (area around the upper course of the Drina river); Humska zemlja (1326–1482) (roughly modern Herzegovina); Primorje (the Coast) (Adriatic coast roughly between Omiš and Herceg Novi)
- Dissolution: end of the 16th c.
- Cadet branches: Vuković; Hranić; Vukčić; Hercegović; Hersekzade; Isabegović; Isabegzade

The House of Kosača (Serbian Cyrillic: Косача, pl. Kosače / Косаче), elsewhere Kosačić (Serbian Cyrillic: Косачић, pl. Kosačići / Косачићи), was a Bosnian medieval noble family which ruled over parts of modern-day Bosnia and Herzegovina, Croatia, Montenegro, and Serbia between the 14th century and the 15th century. The land they controlled was known as Humska zemlja (Hum, for short), roughly corresponding to modern region of Herzegovina, which itself was derived from the title Herzog, which Stjepan Vukčić Kosača adopted in 1448, with the Latin title Dux Sancti Sabbae. Besides Hum, they ruled parts of Dalmatia and Rascia. They were vassals to several states, including the Kingdom of Bosnia and Ottoman Empire. Historians think the Kosača family is part of the Kőszegi family (House of Herceg), but there is a lack of evidence for this claim.

The religious confession of the Kosača family is uncertain. They were in contact with the Eastern Orthodox Church, the Church of Bosnia, the Catholic Church and Islam. During the fall of the Bosnian Kingdom, the "Kosače" split into three branches: Venetian, Dalmatian and Ottoman. From then onward, these branches became accepting of the Catholic faith in the first two cases, and of Islam in the third.

== History ==
Flag of Kosača family

The family name Kosača was probably taken after the village of Kosače near Goražde, in the Upper Drina region of eastern Bosnia, where the Kosača family were originally estate owners.

The founder, Vuk was a prominent military commander under Emperor Dušan the Mighty of Serbia (r. 1331–1359) who took part in the conquests of southern Balkans. He was given lands around Upper Drina, province of Rudine.

Vlatko Vuković, the son of Vuk, brought the family to prominence after taking part in battles against the Ottomans. He commanded the victorious Bosnian army at the Battle of Bileća (1388). At the Battle of Kosovo (1389) Bosnian King Tvrtko I sent him to command with his troops. Bosnian contingent under Vlatko was positioned at the left flank from the Serbian army led by Prince Lazar of Serbia. The battle was at first reported as a victory, also by Vlatko himself, however it has been concluded as inconclusive, with a long-term Ottoman victory.

In 1448, Stjepan Vukčić Kosača styled himself "By the Grace of God Herceg of Hum and Duke of Primorje, Bosnian Grand Duke, Knyaz of Drina and the rest", adding "Herceg of Hum and the Coast" to the style, and in 1450 he styled himself "By the Grace of God Stjepan Herceg of Saint Sava, Lord of Hum and Bosnian Grand Duke, Knyaz of Drina and the rest", adding "Herceg of Saint Sava". This title had considerable public relations value, because Sava's relics were consider miracle-working by people of all Christian faiths. The Kosačas themselves, however, were one of the few non-Orthodox noble families in Hum. His lands were known as Herzog's lands or later Herzegovina.

King Stjepan Tomaš of Bosnia married Katarina Kosača, daughter of Stjepan Vukčić, in a Catholic ceremony in May 1446 ensuring, at least for a short while, he had the support of the most powerful nobleman in the kingdom and a staunch supporter of the Bosnian Church, Stjepan Vukčić.

== Members ==
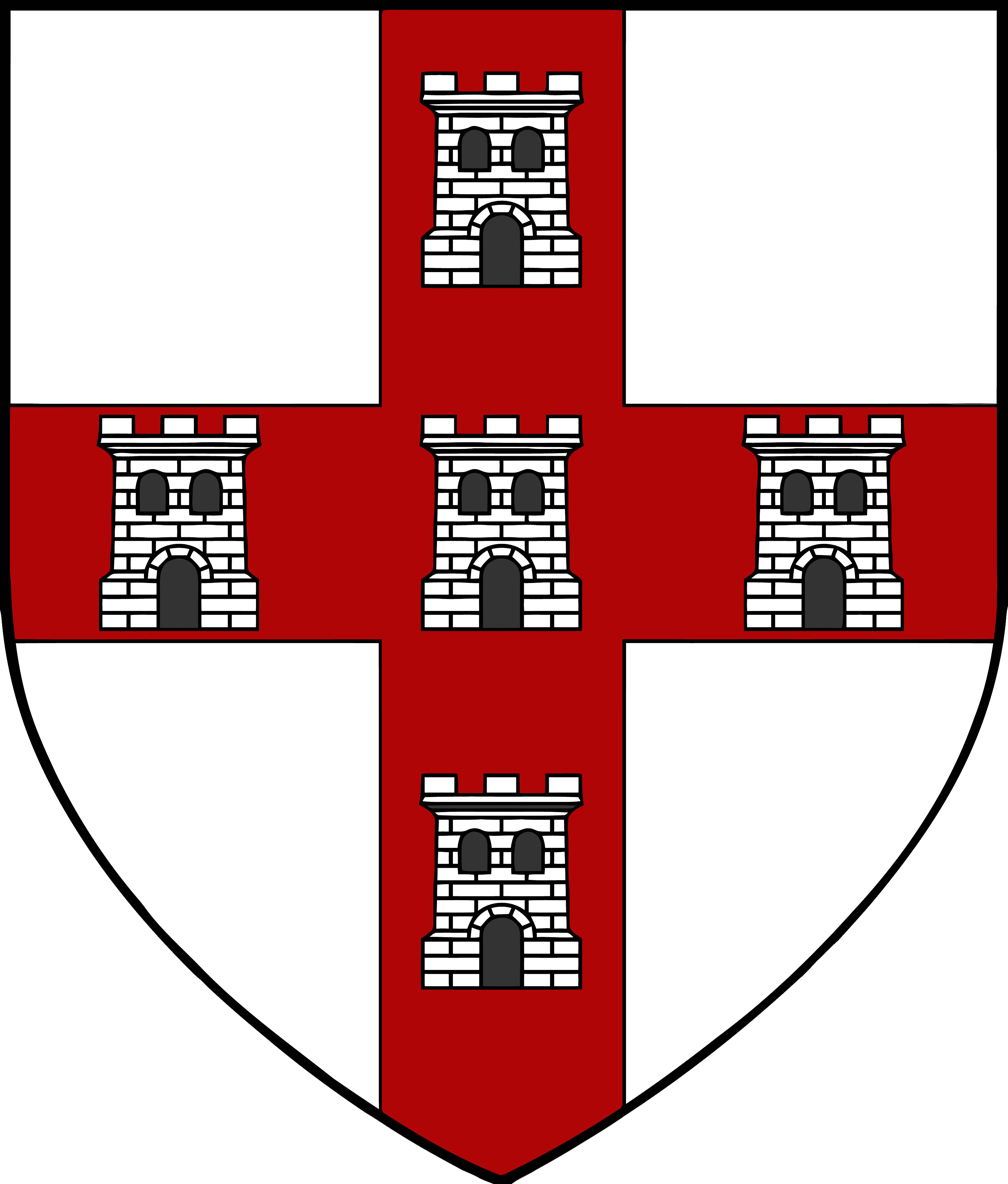
Coat of Arms of the "Vuković", from the Fojnica Armorial (18th century).

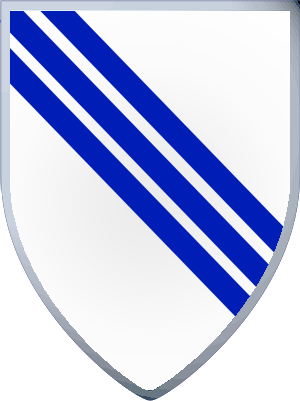
Sandalj's proto-heraldic escutcheon from marriage to Katarina Vuković Hrvatinić.

- Vuk Kosača, military commander (voivode)

- Vlatko Vuković, Grand Duke of Bosnia, died 1392
- Hrana Vuković

- Sandalj Hranić, Grand Duke of Bosnia, ca 1392–1435
- Vuk Hranić, knyaz in the Bosnian court

- Ivan Vuković, prince

- Adam Vuković

- Vukac Hranić, knyaz in the Bosnian court

- Stjepan Vukčić Kosača, Grand Duke of Bosnia 1435–1466, also Herzog of Saint Sava, 1450–1466

- Vladislav Hercegović, Grand Duke of Bosnia, ca. 1450–1463

- Balša Hercegović (fl. 1455)
- Petar

- Vlatko Hercegović, Herzog of Saint Sava, 1466–1482
- Hersekzade Ahmed Pasha, (Turkish: Hersekli Ahmed-Pasa; Serbo-Croatian: Ahmed-paša Hercegović), born Stjepan Hercegović, Ottoman Grand Vizier, married to Hundi Hatun, the daughter of Sultan Bayezid II
- Mara Hercegović
- Katarina Kosača-Kotromanić, Queen consort of Bosnia - wife of Stjepan Tomaš, King of Bosnia

- Sigismund (Šimun) Kotromanić, later converted to Islam and changed his name to Isak-beg Kraljević (Turkish: Ishak-bey Kraloglu)
- Katarina Kotromanić, later she converted to Islam and changed her name to Tahiri-hanuma, buried in Skopje in "turbe" (mausoleum)

== Religious legacy ==
=== Eastern Orthodoxy ===
The Eastern Orthodox church building attributed as endowment of Stjepan Vukčić is the Church of Saint George in Sopotnica near Goražde, which is believed to be finished during 1452. In the valley of Šćepan Polje, below the Soko fort ruins, also foundation remains of the small church of Saint Stephen have been found but the results of archaeological research have never been published, however, it is believed to be endowment of Sandalj Hranić.

=== Catholic ===
Catholics from the region often visit Katarina Kosača's tomb in the Roman church of Santa Maria in Aracoeli. Her tombstone features a life-size portrait and the coat of arms of the Kotromanići and Kosača at each side. The inscription, originally written in Bosnian Cyrillic (Inscription, external link) but in 1590 replaced with a Latin one, which reads:

Catharinae Reginae Bosnensi
Stephani ducis santi sabbae sorori
et genere Helene et domo principis
Stephani natae Thomae regis Bosane
vsori Qvanrum vixit annorum LIIII
et obdormivit Romae anno Domini
MCCCCLXXVIII dei XXV oteobris
monumentum ipsus scriptis positiv.

=== Islam ===
"Turbe" mausoleum in Skopje was destroyed in the 1963 Skopje earthquake. The mausoleum in memory of Princess Katherine Kotromanić, referred in Turkish sources as the "Tahiri-hanuma", was built by Isa beg Ishaković, a member of the Kosaca Ottoman branch. It was significant as being an example of very rare occurrence that a mausoleum is dedicated to a female person. After the quake, the mausoleum of the princess was reconstructed in 2014 by the Ministry of Culture of Macedonia with financial contributions from the Ministry of Culture and Sports of Bosnia and Herzegovina. A tradition of the locals has been maintained to this day by the visiting and burning of candles.
