= Balša Hercegović =

Medieval Bosnian noble

- Duke of Saint Sava
- Born: c. 1458
- Died: c. 1514
- Noble family: Kosača
- Spouse: Catherine Querini
- Father: Vladislav Hercegović
- Mother: Anna Kantakouzene or Jelena Nelipić

Balša Petar Hercegović (Serbian Cyrillic: Балша Петар Херцеговић, c. 1458 - c. 1514) was the titular "Duke of St. Sava" (Latin: dux sancti Sabae), as son of duke Vladislav Hercegović and Byzantine princess Anna Kantakouzene. He was born before the Ottoman conquest of the Bosnian Kingdom (1463). Sometime c. 1460, Vladislav sent Anna and their children to live in the Republic of Ragusa. His father was given the estate of Kalnik near Križevci, Croatia in 1469 by king Matthias Corvinus. Balša joined his father and remained in Hungary, where he was later active at the court of king Vladislaus II.

Historian D. Lovrenović noted that it was possible that he was Jelena Nelipić's son.

== Sources ==
- Nicol, Donald M. (1968). The Byzantine Family of Kantakouzenos (Cantacuzenus) ca. 1100-1460: A Genealogical and Prosopographical Study. Washington: Dumbarton Oaks Center for Byzantine Studies.
- Pálosfalvi, Tamás (2016). "A szentszávai hercegek Magyarországon" [The Dukes of Saint Sava in Hungary]. Hercegek és hercegségek a középkori Magyarországon [Dukes and Duchies in Medieval Hungary] (in Hungarian). Székesfehérvár: Városi Levéltár és Kutatóintézet. pp. 111–125.
