= Vukac Hranić =

15th century Bosnian nobleman

Gospodin Vukac Hranić
- knez (comes, "count")
- Born: second half of the 14th century
- Died: 1432
- Noble family: Kosača
- Spouse: Katarina
- Issue: Stjepan Vukčić Kosača; Teodora
- Father: Hrana Vuković

Vukac Hranić Kosača (Serbian Cyrillic: Вукац Хранић Косача; died 1432) was powerful Bosnian magnate and nobleman from Kosača noble family with the title of knez, during the reigns of Tvrtko II (r. 1404–1409, first reign), Stephen Ostoja (r. 1409–1418), Stephen Ostojić (r. 1418–1421) and Tvrtko II again (r. 1421–1443).

== Life and career ==
Vukac was born in the second half of the 14th century as the second son of Hrana Vuković. He was younger brother of Grand Duke of Bosnia, Sandalj Hranić (l. 1370–1435), and older brother of knez Vuk Hranić (d. 1424). Both Vukac and Vuk were subordinate to their powerful older brother Sandalj, who governed Hum (Humska zemlja), southernmost part of the Kingdom of Bosnia. Sandalj had succeeded their uncle Vlatko Vuković as Grand Duke of Bosnia and Lord of Hum in 1392.

Vukac held part of his family's hereditary lands in Podrinje (mentioned in 1415), and the region of Govza by the Bistrica river, and the town of Jeleč, which he was given following the death of his younger brother Vuk in 1425. He married Katarina (d. 1456), whose origin is deemed unknown, in August 1403. With Katarina he had two children, a son, Stjepan, and a daughter, Teodora, who married Radoslav Pavlović (1420–41). Stjepan was since 1419 mentioned in documents alongside his father and uncles as he had already back then been chosen to succeed Sandalj in the future. The Republic of Ragusa granted Sandalj, Vukac, Vuk and Stjepan the status of Ragusan nobility and senators, and an estate in Ragusa (Dubrovnik) by charter dated 29 June 1419.

Vukac was actively participated in the peace talks between the Kingdom of Bosnia and the Republic of Ragusa in 1405.

During the peace talks between dukes Radoslav Pavlović and Sandalj, besides the Ragusans, Vukac actively participated working for peace (he was Sandalj's brother and Radoslav's father-in-law). Peace was concluded on 1 February 1423.

In February 1425, Brailo Tezalović and Vukac arrived at Ragusa to once again start talks about the sale of Radoslav Pavlović's part of Konavle to the Republic of Ragusa. After the sale of eastern Konavle by Radoslav to the Republic of Ragusa in 1426, Vukac and Radoslav Obradović received 200 ducats each.

Vukac died in 1432. His son Stjepan succeeded as the chief of the Kosača family following the death of Sandalj in 1435.

== Family ==
He married Katarina (d. 1456), of unknown origin, in August 1403. He had two children, a son and a daughter:

- Stjepan Vukčić Kosača, vojvoda
- Teodora Vukčić, married Radoslav Pavlović Radinović (1420–41), member of the House of Pavlović

It is possible that Vukac had another son, Isa-Beg Isaković, the first governor of Ottoman Bosnia (1450s–60s).
