= Vuk Kosača =

Serbian nobleman

- knyaz, duke
- Born: 1317; Rudine
- Died: 1359 (ca. 42); Rudine
- Family: Kosača
- Issue: Vlatko; Hrana
- Father: Unnamed knez from Rudine

Vuk (Serbian Cyrillic: Вук; 1317–1359), sometimes also called Hran in sources, was a 14th century magnate and a powerful nobleman in service to the Serbian king Stefan Dušan (r. 1331–55). Vuk is considered to be a progenitor of Bosnian noble family, the Kosačas, one of the most prominent during the 14th and 15th century Bosnia. He held a possessions in eastern Bosnia, in Podrinje. He was a long-term rival of the Rastislalićs, a nobility from the northeast Serbia.

== Life and career ==
Ragusan chronicler Mavro Orbini (1563–1614), write that Vuk was born in 1317, as son of an unnamed knyaz from Rudine, in eastern Bosnia, in Podrinje on the left bank of the Upper Drina river, where his father held a possessions. Vuk is considered to be a progenitor of a Bosnian noble family, the Kosačas, which will become one of three most influential in the Banate and Kingdom of Bosnia during the 14th and 15th century.

Vuk distinguished himself in the military service to the Serbian king, for which he was awarded land around Rudine, in eastern Bosnia (present-day Bosnia and Herzegovina).

=== Hunting accident ===
After an incident during the two families' hunting trip in Upper Drina, where both had possessions, in which Branko Rastislalić lost his life sometime after 1351, Vuk, being responsible for Branko's death, fled to Hungary. After reconciling with the relatives of Branko, he joined (or returned to) the court of Emperor Stefan Dušan. Nevertheless, a member of the Rastislalić family eventually took revenge on Vuk, and murdered him in Rudine in 1359.

== Issue ==
Vuk had a two sons, Vlatko (fl. 1388–d. 1392), and Hrana Vuković. Vlatko was a celebrated military commander in the service of Bosnian ban and later king, Tvrtko I, who elevated him to a rank of the Grand Duke of Bosnia and awarded him with a land of Hum.

== Sources ==
- Dinić, Mihailo (1940). "Земље Херцега Светога Саве". Glas SKA. 182. Belgrade: SKA: 149–257.
- Tomović, Gordana (2009). "Oblasni gospodari u 14. veku: Užice nekad i sad: Srednji vek" (PDF). Grad Užice. Archived from the original (PDF) on 2011-07-26.
- SANU (1950). Posebna izdanja. Vol. 152. Belgrade: SANU. p. 56.
- Arheološko društvo Jugoslavije (1968). Arheološki pregled. Vol. 10–11. Arheološko društvo Jugoslavije. p. 96.
