= Sokol Fortress (Piva) =

- Šćepan Polje, Montenegro

Site information
- Type: fortress

Location
- Location in Montenegro
- Coordinates: 43.344°N 18.852°E

Site history
- Built for: Bosnian medieval state
- In use: 15th century
- Materials: Limestone

Sokol was a hill-side fortress located near the confluence of the rivers Piva and Tara, today south of the village of Šćepan Polje at the border of Montenegro and Bosnia and Herzegovina. It's also referred to as Sokol grad and Soko.

The fortress was believed to have been mentioned as međurječje lit. 'the place between the rivers' in 10th century sources, and became known as Sokol under the rule of Sandalj Hranić in the 15th century. Below the fortress is the Zagrađe Monastery, a monastery of the Serbian Orthodox Church dedicated to St. John the Baptist.

== Gallery ==
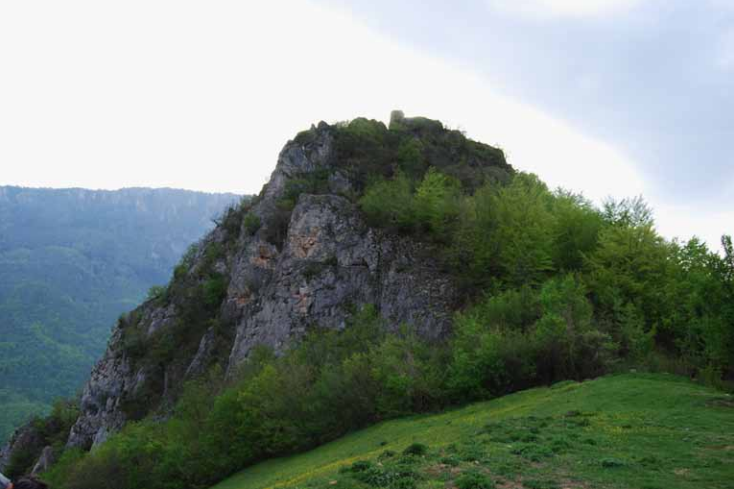
Ruins of the medieval fortress Soko Grad

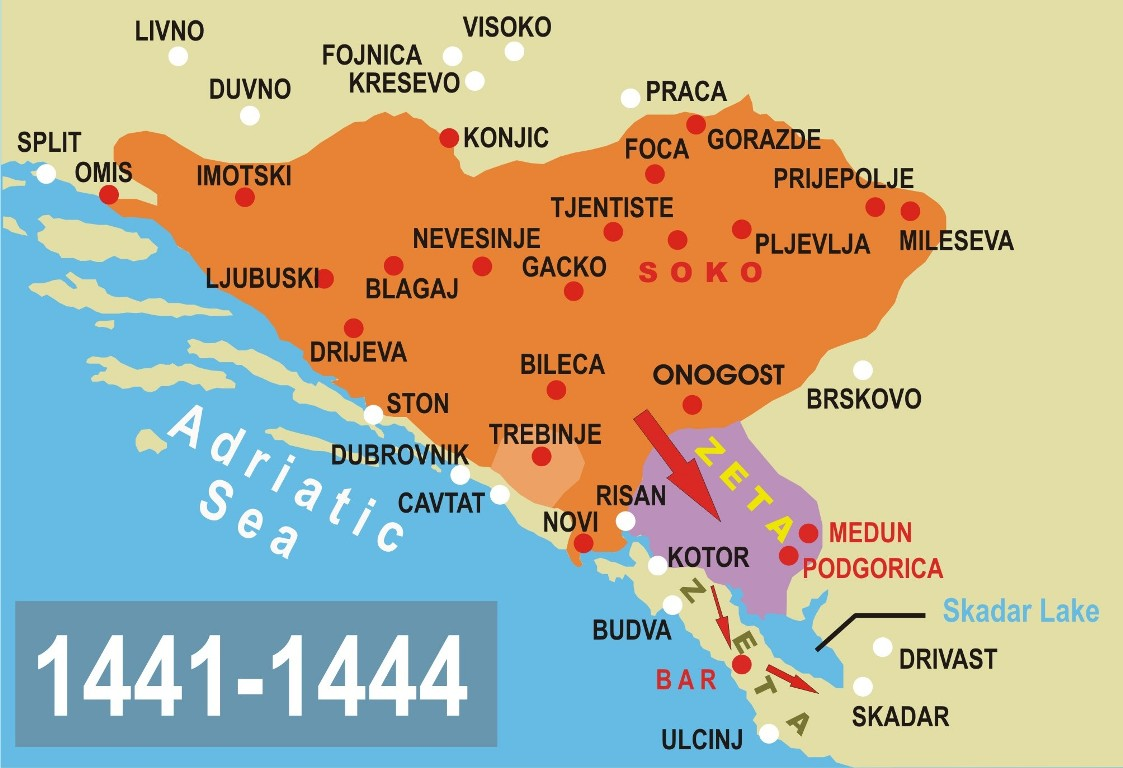
Location of Fortress Soko in 1444, within the Duchy of Saint Sava

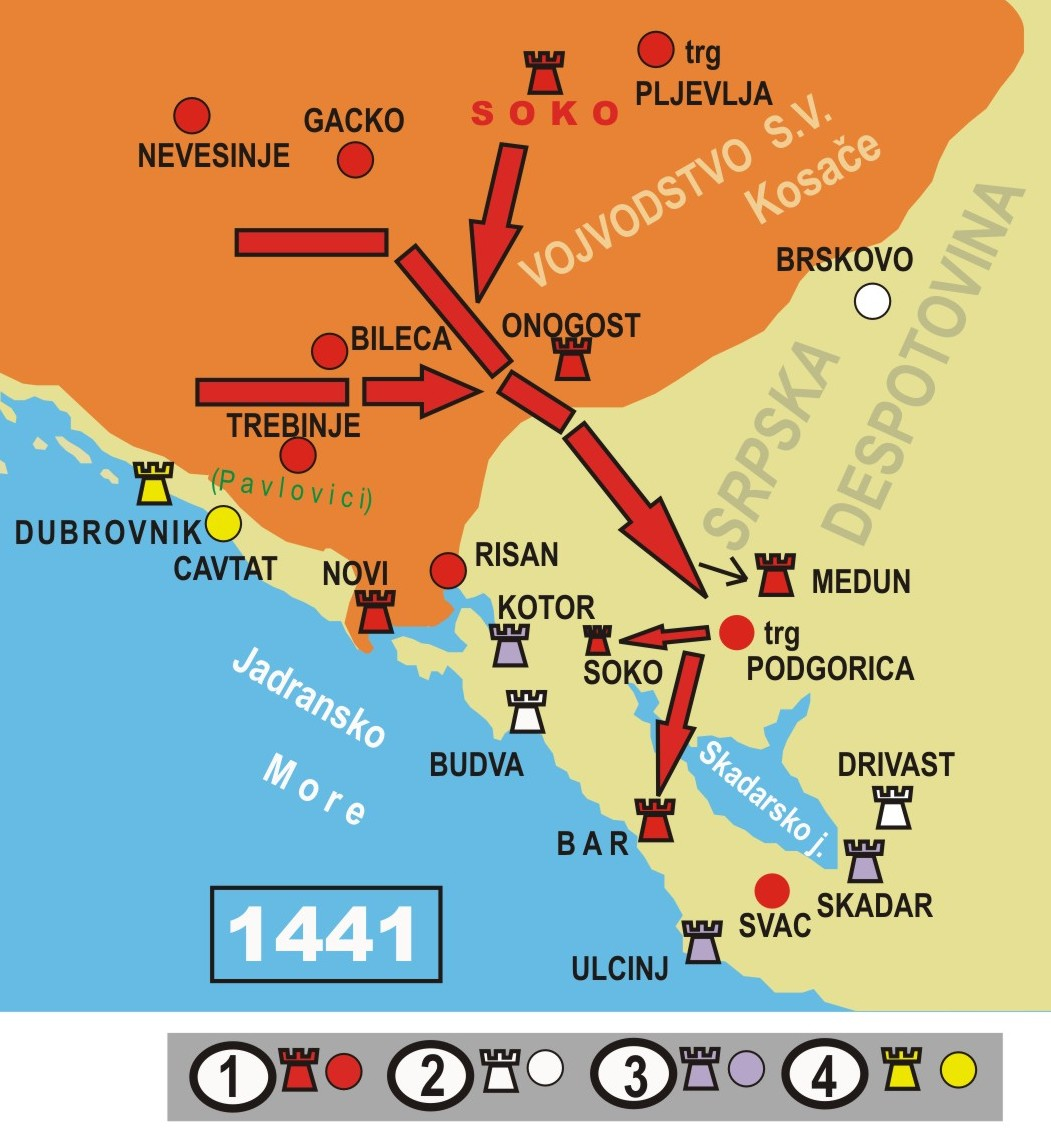
Fortress Soko in 1441, during the breakthrough of Herzog Šćepan to Lordship of Zeta.

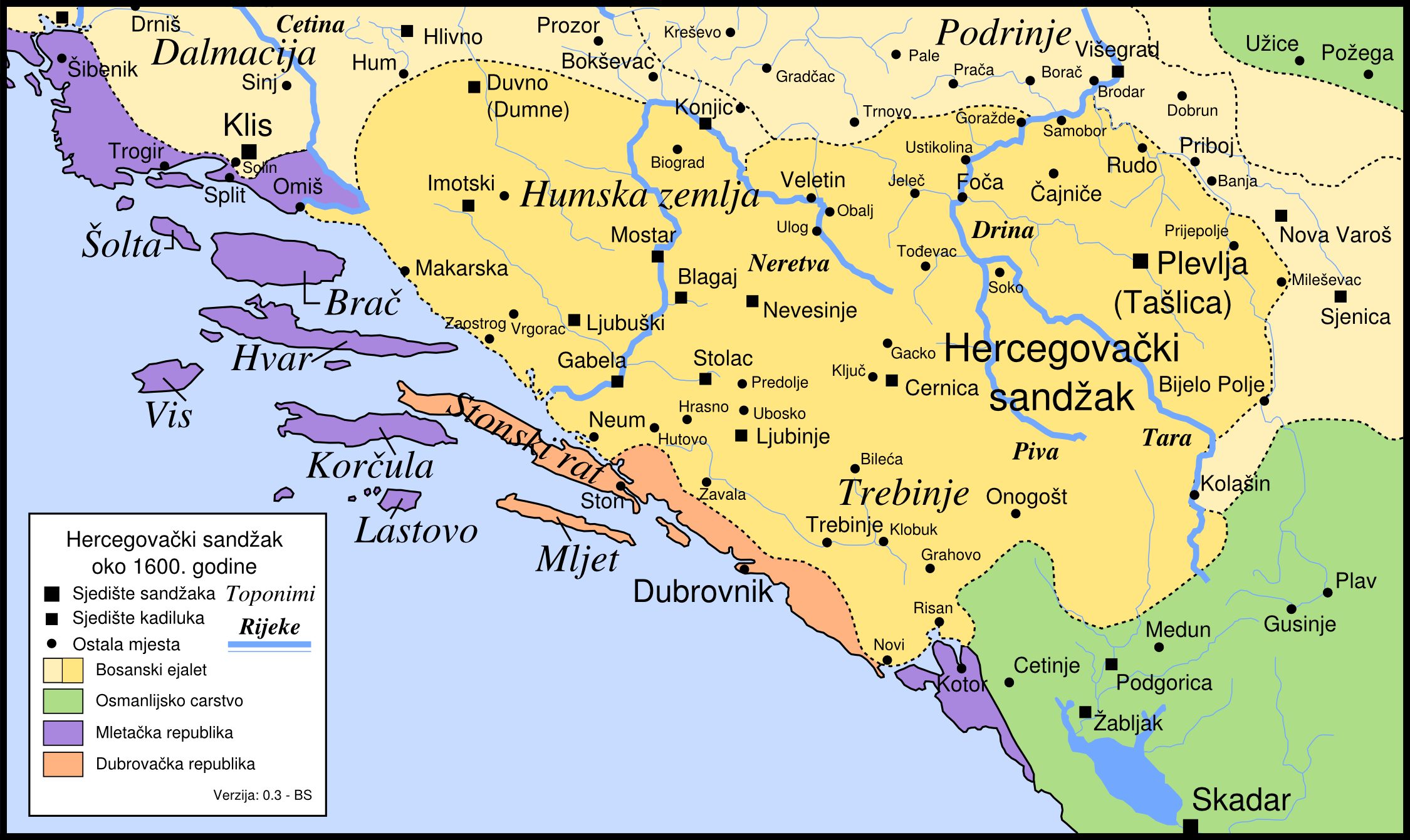
Map of the Sanjak of Herzegovina in 1600 indicating Soko near Piva and Tara
