= Katarina Vuković =

Katarina Vuković, from the medieval Bosnian noble lineage of Hrvatinić, was the second wife of Grand Duke of Bosnia, Sandalj Hranić.

Katarina was the daughter of the Hungarian-Croatian ban Vuk Vukčić from the Bosnian noble family of Hrvatinić. Her uncle was the famous Bosnian Grand Duke Hrvoje Vukčić Hrvatinić. Her mother was Banness Anka, and her sister was Jelena, married to Sandalj's brother, Knyaz Vuk Hranić.

Katarina married Sandalj Hranić in the spring of 1405, when her sister Jelena married Sandalj's brother Knyaz Vuk Hranić. Katarina's marriage to Sandalj existed as a result of political ties between Hrvatinić and Kosača noble families. Katarina, her mother Anka, and Duke Sandalj Hranić kept their property in a deposit in Dubrovnik. The marriage between Katarina and Sandalj broke up during 1410–1411, when good relations between Hrvatinićs and Kosačas soured.
