= Kosače (Goražde) =

Village in Bosnia and Herzegovina

Kosače Косаче
- Village
- Interactive map of Kosače
- Location within Bosnia and Herzegovina
- Coordinates: 43°38′N 18°51′E
- Country: Bosnia and Herzegovina
- Entity: Federation of Bosnia and Herzegovina
- Canton: Bosnian-Podrinje Goražde
- Municipality: Goražde

Area
  - Total: 0.40 sq mi (1.03 km^{2})

Population (2013)
  - Total: 69
  - Density: 170/sq mi (67/km^{2})
- Time zone: UTC+1 (CET)
  - Summer (DST): UTC+2 (CEST)

Kosače (Cyrillic: Косаче) is a village in the municipality of Goražde, Bosnia and Herzegovina.

== Demographics ==
According to the 2013 census, its population was 69.

Ethnicity in 2013
Ethnicity	Number	Percentage
Bosniaks	68	98.6%
other/undeclared	1	1.4%
Total	69	100%
