= Gost Radin =

Bosnian nobleman and krstjanin of the Bosnian Church

- Born: around 1400; Seonica
- Died: before 15 July 1467; Dubrovnik
- Occupations: poklisar, counsellor, ambassador
- Years active: at least 1422−1467
- Children: daughter Vučica, son Brajan, another unknown son
- Relatives: sister Vukna
- Religion: Christian schismatic heterodoxy
- Church: Bosnian Church
- Ordained: court
- Writings: Testament 1466 (will)
- Offices held: ambassador
- Title: krstjanin (1422), starac (1437), gost (from 1447)

Radin (Serbian Cyrillic: Радин), known under his full name, Radin Butković, was a Bosnian nobleman and magnate, who also served as gost, a high ranking prelate of the Bosnian Church during the 15th century in medieval Bosnia.

As his vernacular name suggests, Radin was a local cleric elected by the Bosnians themselves. He was probably born around 1400 in Seonica, village in medieval župa and the settlement Neretva, today the town of Konjic in Bosnia and Herzegovina.

As a high-ranking clergyman of the Bosnian Church, he was also politically savvy, so he distinguished himself as a diplomat and ambassador. Medieval sources mentioned him for the first time in a document dated from 1422 in a rank of a krstjanin (lowest rank in the Bosnian Church clergy) when he engaged in negotiations with the people of Ragusa representing the duke Radosav Pavlović. He was also mentioned as a starac (mid-ranked prelate, loosely transl. elder) in 1437, and as a gost (high-ranking prelate, transl. loosely as bishop – transl. literal as guest) in 1447 while he served at the court of the Grand Duke of Bosnia, Stjepan Vukčić, whom he advised in the capacity of a court chancellor and a court chaplain until the end of duke's life in 1466, just year before his own death. Apart from Seonica, as the place where he was born and which was the seat of his clan, Radin also resided in other major Bosnian seats of power at the time, such as Prača and Blagaj, but also outside the country in Ragusa (today's Dubrovnik), where he compiled his famous will.

== See also ==
- Vlatko Tumurlić

== Bibliography ==
- Ćirković, Sima (1964). Историја средњовековне босанске државе [History of the medieval Bosnian state] (in Serbian). Srpska književna zadruga.
- Fine, John Van Antwerp Jr. (1994) [1987]. The Late Medieval Balkans: A Critical Survey from the Late Twelfth Century to the Ottoman Conquest. Ann Arbor, Michigan: University of Michigan Press. ISBN 978-0-472-08260-5.
