= Hrana Vuković =

14th-century Bosnian nobleman

Gospodin Hrana Vuković
- Grand Duke of Bosnia

Duke
- Reign: ?–1380
- Successor: brother Vlatko Vuković; son Sandalj Hranić
- Died: around 1380
- Noble family: Kosača noble family

Ecclesiastical career
- Religion: Bosnian Church

Hrana Vuković (Serbian Cyrillic: Храна Вуковић) was a Bosnian magnate who ruled the area between Neretva and Drina rivers in Bosnia with the title Grand Duke of Bosnia prior to 1380. He was the father of Sandalj Hranić and brother of Vlatko Vuković. After his death, he was succeeded by Vlatko Vuković as a head of Vuković-Kosača family, and Hrvoje Vukčić Hrvatinić as a Grand Duke of Bosnia.

== Gallery ==
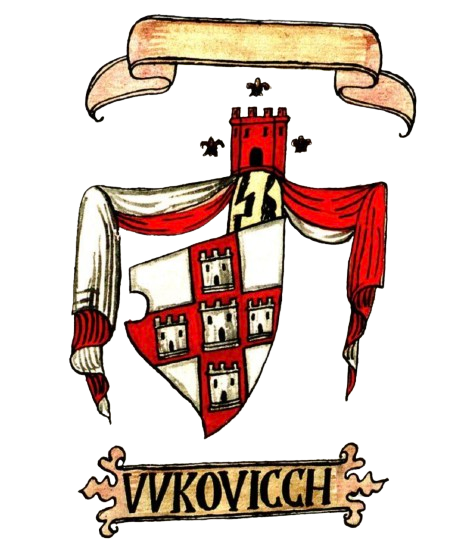
_{Proto-heraldic emblem usually assigned to Vuković noble family (early branch of Kosača) in the so called Illyrian armorials.}

== Sources ==
- Kurtović, Esad (2009). Veliki vojvoda bosanski Sandalj Hranić Kosača (PDF). Institut za istoriju univerzitet Sarajevo. Archived from the original (PDF) on 2018-07-14.
- Fine, John Van Antwerp (December 1975), The Bosnian Church: a new interpretation : a study of the Bosnian Church and its place in state and society from the 13th to the 15th centuries, East European quarterly, ISBN 978-0-914710-03-5
- Fine, John Van Antwerp (1994). The Late Medieval Balkans: A Critical Survey from the Late Twelfth Century to the Ottoman Conquest. University of Michigan Press. ISBN 0-472-08260-4.

Military offices
Preceded by	Grand Duke of Bosnia ?–1380	Succeeded by Hrvoje Vukčić
