= Vlatko Vuković =

14th-century Bosnian nobleman

Gospodin Vlatko Vuković

Grand Duke of Bosnia
- Predecessor: brother Hrana Vuković
- Died: between August 1392 and August 1393
- Family: Kosača noble family
- Father: Vuk Kosača

Vlatko Vuković Kosača (Serbian Cyrillic: Влатко Вуковић Косача; died between August 1392 and August 1393) was a 14th-century Bosnian nobleman who held the titles of the vojvoda humski (duke of Hum) and Grand Duke of Bosnia. He distinguished himself as one of the best military commanders of King Tvrtko I in battles against the Ottoman Empire.

== Biography ==
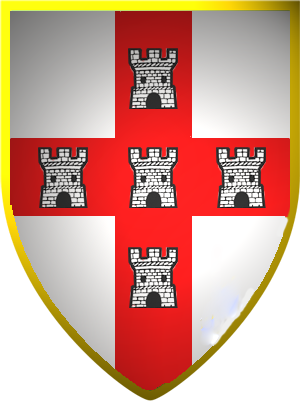
Coat of arms usually assigned to Hrana and Vlatko Vuković in the so-called Illyrian armorials.

Vlatko was probably a son of duke Vuk Kosača, often regarded as founder of the Kosača noble family. He governed Hum (part of modern-day Herzegovina), which was part of the Banate of Bosnia and later Kingdom of Bosnia.

The Ottoman threat was building to the east, threatening Bosnia and its southeastern regions in Hum. On 27 August 1388, Grand Duke Vlatko defeated an Ottoman raiding party (probably up to 18,000 strong) in the Battle of Bileća. Bosnian heavy cavalry is typically credited with winning the battle as they broke the Ottoman ranks and pursued the retreating enemy. Celebrated Ottoman commander Lala Sahin Pasha (Turkish: Lala Şahin Paşa, 1330 – c.1388) barely managed to save himself with the small band of his soldiers.

In 1389, dispatched by his king Tvrtko I, he commanded a Bosnian army contingent as part of a Christian coalition that fought alongside Serbian prince Lazar Hrebeljanović at the Battle of Kosovo against the Ottomans. Vuković was one of few commanders who survived the battle. Although the battle is viewed now as tactically inconclusive, at the time the battle was viewed differently - Vuković reported the outcome of the battle as a victory, as the Ottomans suffered heavy losses and were forced to withdraw for a time.

In 1391–1392, council was convoked by the king or noblemen who opposed the sale of Konavli by Radič Sanković to Dubrovnik, and Vuković and Pavle Radenović later captured Konavli and divided it between themselves.

== Death and burial ==
He died sometime between August 1392 and August 1393. His nephew Sandalj Hranić succeeded him.

=== Stećak confusion ===
It was thought that both Vlatko's and his wife's graves lie marked in a stećak necropolis near the village of Boljuni, not far from Stolac, in Bosnia and Herzegovina. Written in Bosnian Cyrillic, the inscription on that particular grave says: "Ase leži dobri junak i čovjek Vlatko Vuković" (lit. 'Here lies a good hero and good man, Vlatko Vuković'); however, neither grave belongs to a famous duke or his wife.

== Sources ==
- Dinić, Mihailo (1940). "Земље Херцега Светога Саве". Glas SKA. 182. Belgrade: SKA: 149–257.
- Fine, John Van Antwerp Jr. (1991) [1983]. The Early Medieval Balkans: A Critical Survey from the Sixth to the Late Twelfth Century. University of Michigan Press. ISBN 978-0-472-08149-3.
- Kurtović, Esad (2009). Veliki vojvoda bosanski Sandalj Hranić Kosača. Vol. 4 (Historijske monografije ed.). Institut za istoriju Sarajevo. ISBN 9789958649011.
- Radosavljević, Nedeljko (2012). "Where Did Vlatko Vuković's Army Take Communion? (Historical Roots of a Legend)". In Karanović, Zoja (ed.). Belief narrative genres = Жанрови предања = Жанры преданий. Novi Sad: Filozofski fakultet. pp. 173–178.

Military offices
Preceded by Hrvoje Vukčić Hrvatinić	Grand Duke of Bosnia; 1388-1392	Succeeded by Sandalj Hranić Kosača
