= Vukosav Nikolić =

14th century Bosnian nobleman

Gospodin Vukosav Nikolić
- vojvoda, general knez, lord of the Kingdom of Bosnia
- Born: after 1344; Popovo
- Died: 1403; Slano, Republic of Ragusa (now Croatia)
- Noble family: Nikolić
- Issue: Grgur
- Father: Vladislav Nikolić
- Mother: Stanislava Kotromanić
- Occupation: Lord of Neum, the Popovo field and the Lower Neretva region

Vukosav Nikolić (Serbian Cyrillic: Вукосав Николић; fl. 1395–d. 1403) was mid-ranking Bosnian nobleman and a vassal to Kosača-Vukčić family under Sandalj Hranić, who served the Kingdom of Bosnia during the reign of his relative Jelena Gruba (r. 1395–1398) and Stephen Ostoja (r. 1398–1404),. He was the lord of Neum, the Popovo field, and the Lower Neretva region. He fell in battle during the Bosnian-Ragusan War (1403).

== Life ==
The Nikolić noble family held possessions in the Popovo field. The family's eponymous founder, Nikola, descended from župan Bogdan, who in turn descended from Stefan Nemanja's brother, knez Miroslav of Hum (r. ca. 1166–1190). Nikola had two sons, Bogiša and Vladislav, the latter being Vukosav's father. Vladislav had married Stanislava, the daughter or sister of Stephen II Kotromanić (r. 1322–1353), in 1344.

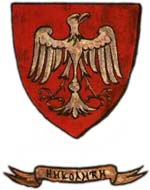
The coat of arms as depicted in semi-fictional Illyrian Armorials under the name Nikolići.

Vukosav is mentioned since 1395 at the royal court. He was the lord of Neum, the Popovo field and the Lower Neretva region.

King Dabiša of Bosnia (r. 1391–1395) died in September 1395. He had designated King Sigismund of Hungary, the husband of his cousin, Queen Mary, as his successor. Mary, however, had predeceased Dabiša, dying in May the same year. The Bosnian nobility refused to recognize Sigismund as king, as his right had rested in his status as Mary's husband. Instead, the nobility installed Jelena Gruba, his widow, and member of the Nikolić family, as the successor to her husband. On November 20, 1395, the Republic of Ragusa wrote a letter that secured Ragusan citizenship for Vukosav and his successors. He and his brothers were among many of the Bosnian nobility who had Ragusan citizenship.

In 1396, when John Kanizsai, the archbishop of Esztergom, fell ill during a trip to Ragusa (Dubrovnik) as King Sigismund's envoy, Vukosav sent a load of expensive wine to him from the Popovo field. In 1398, Queen Jelena was replaced with King Ostoja (r. 1353–77), on an unclear basis (according to Fine 1994, due to her brothers gaining too much wealth and influence, to the dismay of the nobility). The unrest in Bosnia and the change of throne was not to the benefit of the Nikolić family, which had stood on the side of Jelena Gruba against Stephen Ostoja. Jelena Gruba had support in the Nikolić family, the Radivojević noble family, and Tvrtko II. When the new king Stephen Ostoja began taking the throne, the pressed Nikolić family sought refuge on territory of the Republic of Ragusa. In 1398, Vukosav and Radič Sanković opposed the sale of the Dubrovnik coastland between the Republic of Ragusa and Ostoja; the Ragusans had through diplomacy decided that villages of Trnovica and Lisac be handed over to them – Vukosav and Radič refused.

As a nobleman in the service of Sandalj Hranić, Vukosav fell in battle during the Bosnian-Ragusan War (1403), while he supported Ostoja alongside Sandalj Hranić and Radič Sanković. He fell at the coast of Slano, at the Brgat hill near Dubrovnik, while fighting a contingent from Ston. The Ragusans set fire to Šumet and Žrnovnica forcing the Bosnian army to retreat. The same year in autumn, the Ragusan senate permitted Vukosav's son, knez Grgur, to send two of his men to Ston to place a gravestone on the grave of his father ("de faciendo gratiam Gregorio, filio Vocosavi Nikolich, quod possit miter Stagnum duos ex hominibus ad ponendum super corpus patris sui plancham lapideam"). The Nikolić family were Orthodox Christian, which also shows on the gravestone of Vukosav.

== Annotations ==
1. Name: His given name was Vukosav (Serbian Cyrillic: Вукосав) or Vukoslav (Вукослав). His family name was Nikolić (Николић). In Ragusan documents, his name is written Vocosav Nikolich.
2. The coat of arms is found in the Illyrian Armorials under the name Nikolići (Николићи).
