= Humska zemlja =

Historical region of Bosnia and Herzegovina

Humska Zemlja Hum
- Zemlja of Bosnian Banate then Kingdom
- 14th c.–1481
- Kosača Zemlja in orange, as part of medieval Bosnian state.
- Capital: Blagaj (Novi; Ključ)
- Area
  - Coordinates: 43.229°N 17.968°E
- Status: Zemlja
- Government
  - Type: Feudal
  - HQ: Blagaj; Novi; Ključ
- Vojvoda
  - –1393: Vlatko Vuković
  - 1393–1435: Sandalj Hranić
  - 1435–1466: Stjepan Vukčić
  - 1466–1481: Vlatko Hercegović with brother Vladislav
- Family tree
  - noble family: Kosača
  - cadet branch: Vuković, Hranić, Vukčić, Hercegović
- Historical era: Medieval Bosnia
  - Established: 14th c.
  - Disestablished: December 1481
- Contained within
  - Banate: Banate of Bosnia
  - Kingdom: Kingdom of Bosnia
- Subdivisions
  - Type: Župa, opština, town, village
  - Units: Župa Primorje; Kom; Večenike; Broćno; Klobuk; Trebinje; Cavtat
Succeeded by
Sanjak of Herzegovina
Bosnia Eyalet
Duchy of Saint Sava
- Today part of: Bosnia and Herzegovina, Croatia, Montenegro, Serbia

The Humska Zemlja ("Hum Zemlja", Hum; Serbo-Croatian: Humska zemlja, Hum / Хумска земља, Хум) is a historical zemlja that arose in the Middle Ages as well-defined administrative unit of medieval Bosnia ruled by the Kosača dynasty. It included most of today's Herzegovina, in Bosansko Primorje including Konavle, territories on the south of Dalmatia between Omiš and Neretva Delta (modern-day Croatia), parts of Rascia between Prijepolje and Mileševa (modern-day Serbia), and in Boka Kotorska and south to Budva (modern-day Montenegro). The name for this zemlja derived from the earlier name for the region, Zahumlje. The seat of Kosače family was in the town and fortress of Blagaj and during the winter seasons, Novi.

== Name ==
The name for the region changed over time and had different geographical and political meaning. As a politically separate entity, Humska zemlja is not synonymous with Zahumlje, nor Herzegovina.

The Zahumlje was first mentioned in the 10th century. The name Humska zemlja can be traced back to the 12th century. It was mentioned in a charter by Serbian Great Prince Stefan Nemanja to Split commune. At that time it already incorporated Zahumlje into new geopolitical paradigm.

During the 14th and 15th centuries, many people of different status were migrating from Hum to the Dalmatian cities of Split, Trogir, Šibenik, and Zadar. They would identify themselves as originating or coming from the Humska zemlja (Comsqua semia) or Latin: Terra Chelmi. In one case in Split from 1454, it was recorded that an individual identified as a person coming from the "Principality of the Herzog Stjepan the Bosnian" (de comitatu Duche Stephani bossinensis).

== Geography ==
In a geopolitical sense the Humska zemlja is not synonymous to Zahumlje, and it differs geographically from both Zahumlje and today's Herzegovina. Geographically, roughly outlined, it included in the west–east direction, the area along the Adriatic coast, from Vrulja near Omiš and the big bend of the river Cetina to the hinterland of Dubrovnik, and in the south–north direction, from the coast of the Adriatic and Pelješac to the Upper Neretva and Konjic.

From the 9th to the first half of the 11th century, in the neighborhood of the Principality of Hum, on the left bank of the Neretva all the way to Dubrovnik, there was another political formation, independent of the Principality of Hum, and it was called "Zahumlje".

== History ==
The Humska zemlja functioned as a principality (also known as "Humsko kneštvo", or English transl. Principality of Hum) until 1326. From the middle of the 12th century onwards, Hum's knez (humski knez) recognized the senior rights of the Hungarian-Croatian king, and for some time during the 13th century they would recognize the authority of Serbian king, while after 1326, the Bosnian ban Stjepan II annexed it for Bosnia.

Until the end of the 11th century, the Principality of Hum itself was part of the broader structure of the Croatian king's authority. At the time of the dynastic crisis and the dissolution of the Croatian Kingdom at the end of the 11th century, the Knez of Hum gained almost complete independence. As a result, his rule now extended to the west as far as Imotski with the župa of the same name. On the other hand, during the 12th century, Hum knez's authority definitely expanded to the east, into neighboring Zahumlje. These expansions of the Principality were also accompanied with certain territorial losses, mostly on the Adriatic islands. But the most significant consequence of the expansion of the rule of the Knezs of Hum to Zahumlje is the loss of the distinctive character of Zahumlje itself, although that name will appear sporadically with the Principality of Hum for some time to come.

After 1326, the Bosnian ban Stjepan II conquered the country. This signified formal disappearance as an independent principality. It still functioned in line with medieval understandings of a state and the way medieval kingdoms functioned, so it retained a certain form of separate political life and the elements of the previous order. This primarily refers to the type of representative body whose most important function was judicial, known as the "Hum's table" ("Humski stol"), and traditional procedure known as "the Hum's question" ("Humsko pitanje"). However, with an emergence of Kosača these political characteristics and local traditions will begin to wither away.

During the 13th and early 14th centuries the Bosnian House of Kotromanić, the Bosnian bans Stjepan I Kotromanić and Stjepan II Kotromanić, joined these regions to the Bosnian state, with the King Tvrtko I Kotromanić extending territories even further, beyond what is modern-day Herzegovina proper. The region was overwhelmed by Stjepan II in 1322–1326. By the second half of the 14th century, Bosnia apparently reached its peak under Ban Tvrtko I who came into power in 1353 and became the first Bosnian king by 1377. The elevation into a kingdom was through the Serbian crown coronation of Tvrtko I, held at the Serbian Orthodox Mileševa Monastery before the relics of Saint Sava of Serbia, following the death of the last Serbian Emperor from the Nemanjić dynasty, Stefan Uroš V, who died childless and without an heir in 1371.

=== Bosnian annexation ===
In the first half of the 1330s, the Branivojević family had emerged as strongest clan in Hum, claiming the territories from Cetina River to the town of Kotor, including entire Pelješac, and controlling Ston, where their court was located. Though nominal vassals of Serbia, the Branivojević family attacked Serbian interests and other local nobles of Hum, who in 1326 turned against both Serbia and Branivojević clan by approaching to Stjepan Kotromanić II, the ban of Bosnia, who took matters into his hands and annexed Hum in campaign between April and June 1326, banishing Serbs and Branivojevićs. The war of Hum between Bosnia and Dubrovnik against Serbia, will have a new episode between 1327 and 1328, when Dečanski attacked Dubrovnik because the Republic annexed Branivojevićs holdings in Ston and Pelješac (Stonski rat). This whole affair and the fact that loyal Bosnian lordship was in Hum and Branivojevićs destroyed altogether, along with the unrest on the east, prompted Dušan, to sell Ston and Pelješac (Stonski Rat) to Dubrovnik in 1333 and turned to the east to acquire territories in Macedonia.

Most of the local nobility and ruling elite, attached itself to the new supreme ruler, the Bosnian ban and later king.
Other than a rebellion by knez Peter, son of Toljen of Hum, whom Stjepan captured and put to death, the Hum nobles remained loyal to Kotoromanićs who firmly held the region from now on. These nobles also continued to manage their local affairs in the region. At first, vassals of the Bosnian Ban, Draživojević-Sanković from Nevesinje, become the leading family of Hum in the second half of the 1330s, while Serbian vassals retained easternmost reaches of Hum. Stjepan II, however, did take direct control of the valuable custom and market-town at Drijeva. The population of Hum remained largely Orthodox, compared to elsewhere in Bosnia where the Bosnian Church predominated, and after the arrival of the Franciscans in the 1340s, Catholicism also began to spread.

In 1350, Tsar Stephen Uroš IV Dušan of Serbia attacked Bosnia in order to regain Hum. Since the invasion was not successful, the tsar tried to negotiate peace, which would be sealed by arranging Elizabeth's marriage to his son and heir apparent, Stephen Uroš V.The tsar expected Hum to be ceded as Elizabeth's dowry, which her father refused. Later that year she was formally betrothed to the 24-year-old Louis, who hoped to counter Dušan's expansionist policy either with her father's help or as his eventual successor. In 1357, Louis summoned the young Tvrtko I to Požega and compelled him to surrender most of western Hum as Elizabeth's dowry, and under whose rule territory remained for only about thirty years, until 1390. During that period, the function of the local knez was re-established, but this time not as a semi-independent ruler, but merely as a king's emissary. Since 1390, the land of Hum has been retaken by the Bosnian king again and put under the direct administration of the local noble family Jurjević-Radivojević.

=== Emergence of Kosača and Pavlovićs ===
Beside an emerging Kosača family another powerful Bosnian noble family, the Pavlović's from eastern Bosnia, at the time headed by Pavle Radinović, whose seat was in Borač near Rogatica, including holdings in župa of Vrhbosna and župa of Drina, also shared some of the territories in Hum, mostly centered around Trebinje, including fortress of Klobuk in župa Vrm.

But, at the time when Kosače received the Hum from the King, it was Draživojević-Sanković's who had a primacy in the region. This Bosnian noble family is credited for capturing Hum for Bosnia and the Ban Stjepan II, who in 1326 dispatched their early branch, the Draživojević's (the next generation of Bogopenec), headed by Milten, along with other noblemen, into Hum to oust the Branivojević family, at the time nominal vassals of Serbia, and take Hum for him.

==== Sankovićs' prominence ====
So, Sanković's were very active in the 14th and beginning of the 15th century in Hum. Their seat was in Zaborani and in Glavatičevo's hamlet Biskupi, where today the family necropolis with a stećci is still present and protected as a National monument of Bosnia and Herzegovina. The most prominent members were Sanko Miltenović and his oldest son, Radič Sanković. Sanko, the eponymous founder of the Sanković's branch (the tribe's progenitor was Dražen Bogopenec), died in a battle while leading the Bosnian army to aid Ragusa against Serbian lord, the Nikola Altomanović, who campaigned against Ragusa in 1370.

The Ottoman threat was brewing to the east, threatening Bosnia and its southeastern regions in Hum. On 27 August 1388, Radić participated in the Battle of Bileća, when the Bosnian army led by the Grand Duke Vlatko Vuković, defeated the Ottoman raiding party of up to 18,000 strong. Bosnian heavy cavalry is typically credited with winning the battle as they broke the Ottoman ranks and pursued the retreating enemy. Celebrated Ottoman commander Lala Sahin Pasha (Turkish: Lala Şahin Paşa, 1330 – cca 1382) barely managed to save himself with the small band of his soldiers.

In 1391–1392, Radič and his brother Beljak tried to sell their possessions in Konavle to the Republic of Ragusa. However, a stanak was convoked by the king and the noblemen who opposed the sale of Konavli by Radič Sanković to Dubrovnik. The Grand Duke Vlatko Vuković and the knez Pavle Radinović were sent against Radič in December 1391 after receiving the stanak's blessings. The two captured Radič and occupied Konavli, dividing it between themselves, despite protests from Ragusa.

==== Vlatko Vuković, Grand Duke of Bosnia ====
During the mid-14th century, parts of Hum (Herzegovina) were given by the King Tvrtko I to, at that point in time relatively insignificant Bosnian clan of Kosača family and its Vuković branch, headed by the Grand Duke of Bosnia Vlatko Vuković, who received it as an award for his service as a supreme commander of the Bosnian army.

After Vlatko Vuković died sometime between August 1392 - August 1393, he was succeeded by his nephew the Grand Duke of Bosnia, Sandalj Hranić, who continued struggle against Radič, who regained his freedom in 1398, immediately seeking to restore his lost lands, becoming an important ally of the King Stjepan Ostoja.

==== Rise of Sandalj and fall of Sankovićs ====
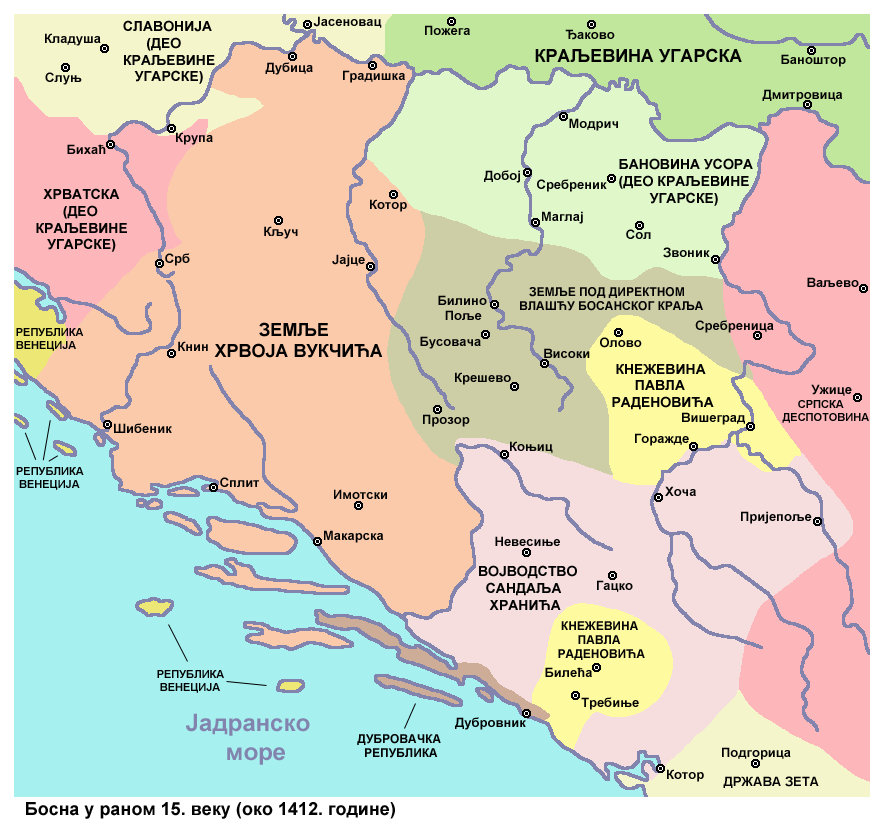
Sandalj's Hum, in magenta hue, and other zemljas of the medieval Bosnian state

In the beginning of the 15th century, Hrvoje Vukčić Hrvatinić ruled over the western Hum, and Sandalj Hranić Kosača ruled over its eastern part, while the Neretva river remain a border between their possessions.

The territory on the right bank of the Lower Neretva was at the time controlled by Kosača vassals, a local clan and magnates of Radivojević–Jurjević–Vlatković.

Radič participated in the Bosnian-Dubrovnik War in 1403-1404, leading the attacks on Dubrovnik in the name of the King Stjepan Ostoja. Sandalj captured Radič, took all of his land, and after blinding him he throw him in prison, where Radić died in 1404 marking the end of the Sanković family.

==== Herceg-Stjepan Vukčić ====
Kosača symbols during Stjepan Vukčić.

When Sandalj died, Stjepan Vukčić, as Sandalj's nephew, inherited lordship over the Hum, and was the last Bosnian nobleman who had effective control over the province (zemlja) before Ottoman conquest. He titled himself Duke of Hum and Primorje, Bosnian Grand Duke, Knyaz of Drina, and later Herzog of Saint Sava, Lord of Hum and Bosnian Grand Duke, Knyaz of Drina and the rest. This "Saint Sava" part of the title had considerable public relations value, because Sava's relics were consider miracle-working by people of all faiths. Following the Ottomans conquest and fall of Bosnian Kingdom, Hum or Humska zemlja became known as Hercegovina (transl. Herzegovina), which literally means "Herzog's land".

In 1451, Stjepan attacked and laid siege to the city of Dubrovnik. He had earlier been made a nobleman of the Republic of Ragusa and, consequently, the Ragusan government now proclaimed him a traitor. A reward of 15,000 ducats, a palace in Dubrovnik worth 2,000 ducats, and an annual income of 300 ducats was offered to anyone who would kill him, along with the promise of hereditary Ragusan nobility which also helped hold this promise to whoever did the deed. The threat worked and Stjepan eventually raised the siege. Following threat Stjepan raised the siege.

Stjepan Vukčić died in 1466 and was succeeded as herceg by his second-youngest son Vlatko Hercegović, who struggled to retain as much of the territory as he could. In 1471, the Ottomans excluded Hum from the Bosnian Sanjak and established a new, separate Sanjak of Herzegovina with its seat in Foča.

==== Fall of Hum ====
In November 1481, Ajaz-Bey of the Sanjak of Herzegovina besieged Vlatko's capital Novi but just before 14 December 1481, Vlatko ceased resisting and agreed with the Ottomans to move with his family to Istanbul. Now the entirety of Herzegovina was reorganized into the already established Sanjak of Herzegovina with the seat in Foča, and later, in 1580, would become one of the sanjaks of the Bosnia Eyalet. This signified the disappearance of the last-remaining independent point of the medieval Bosnian state.

== Emergence Herzegovina ==
In 1448 Stjepan assumed another title, the title of herceg, and styled himself Herceg of Hum and the Coast, Grand Duke of Bosnia, Knyaz of Drina, and the rest, and since 1450, Herceg of Saint Sava, Lord of Hum, Grand Duke of Bosnia, Knyaz of Drina, and the rest. Stjepan's title will prompt the Ottomans to start calling Humska zemlja by using the possessive form of the noun Herceg, Herceg's land(s) (Herzegovina), which remains a long-lasting legacy in the name of Bosnia and Herzegovina to this day.

The name Herzegovina, which still exists with the name Bosnia and Herzegovina, is the most-important and indelible legacy of Stjepan Vukčić Kosača; it is unique within the Serbo-Croatian-speaking Balkans, because one person gave his noble title, which in the last few years of his life became inseparable from his name, to a region previously called Humska zemlja or Hum. The Ottoman custom of calling newly acquired lands by the names of their earlier rulers was of decisive importance. Also, Stjepan did not establish this province as a feudal and political unit of the Bosnian state; that honor befell Grand Duke of Bosnia Vlatko Vuković, who received it from King Tvrtko I; Sandalj Hranić expanded it and reaffirmed the Kosača family's supremacy.

== Rusag's and petty noble families ==
- Nikolić
- Ridivojević-Vlatković

== Župas, towns, villages ==
Town of Novi, founded by the King Tvrtko I, today Herceg Novi, was winter residence of Kosača

Seats of the ruling families were:

- Zaborani to Sanković
- Glavatičevo to Sanković
- Blagaj to Kosača
- Ključ to Kosača
- Novi to Kosača

The župas:

- Kom
- Vatnica
- Večenike
- Broćno
- Vrm
- Vrsinje
- Dabar
- Dračevica
- Drijeva
- Bišće
- Popovo
- Luka

The towns and villages:

- Ljubuški
- Goražde

Main custom-towns, market-towns and mining towns:

- Drijeva.

== See also ==
- Pavlovića zemlja
- Bosna zemlja
- Donji Kraji
- Usora
- Soli

== Sources ==
- Ančić, Mladen (2005). "Što je Bosna bez Hercegovine?". National Security and the Future (in Croatian). 6 (3–4): 87–128. ISSN 1332-4454.
- Ančić, Mladen (2001). "Humsko kneštvo". Na rubu zapada: tri stoljeća srednjovjekovne Bosne (in Croatian). Hrvatski institut za povijest. pp. 141–176. ISBN 978-953-6491-43-8.
- Anđelić, Pavao (1983). Srednjovjekovne župe. Teritorijalni sistem lokalne uprave u ranijim stoljećima srednjeg vijeka na području nekadašnje Humske zemlje: naučnoistraživački projekat. Sarajevo: Zemaljski muzej BiH.
- Ćirković, Sima (1964). Istorija srednjovekovne bosanske države. Beograd: Srpska književna zadruga.
- Ćirković, Sima (1964a). Herceg Stefan Vukčić-Kosača i njegovo doba [Herceg Stefan Vukčić-Kosača and his time] (in Serbian). Naučno delo SANU. OCLC 4864621.
- Ćirković, Sima (2003). "Pavlovića zemlja (Contrata dei Paulovich): Postanak i razvitak velikaške teritorije". Zemlja Pavlovića: Srednji vijek i period turske vladavine. Banja Luka: ANURS. pp. 37–45.
- Engel, Pal (1999). Ayton, Andrew (ed.). The realm of St. Stephen: a history of medieval Hungary, 895–1526 Volume 19 of International Library of Historical Studies. Penn State Press. ISBN 0-271-01758-9.
- Gromada, Tadeusz; Halecki, Oskar (1991). Jadwiga of Anjou and the rise of East Central Europe. Social Science Monographs. ISBN 0-88033-206-9.
- Fajfrić, Željko (2000), "3. Stjepan II Kotromanić (1314-1353)", Kotromanići, Janus
- Fine, John Van Antwerp Jr. (1994) [1987]. The Late Medieval Balkans: A Critical Survey from the Late Twelfth Century to the Ottoman Conquest. Ann Arbor, Michigan: University of Michigan Press. ISBN 0472082604.
- Krekić, Bariša (1978). "Contributions of Foreigners to Dubrovnik's Economic Growth in the Late Middle Ages". Viator. 9: 385–404. doi:10.1525/9780520327320-019. ISBN 9780520327320.
- Kurtović, Esad (2009). Veliki vojvoda bosanski Sandalj Hranić Kosača (PDF) (in Bosnian) (Historijske monografije; knj. 4 ed.). Institut za istoriju Sarajevo. ISBN 978-9958-649-01-1. Archived from the original (PDF) on 5 March 2016.
- Mišić, Siniša (1996). Humska zemlja u srednjem veku. DBR International Publishing. ISBN 978-86-7993-013-2.
- Várdy, Steven Béla; Grosschmid, Géza; Domonkos, Leslie S. (1986). Louis the Great: King of Hungary and Poland. East European Monographs. ISBN 0-88033-087-2.
- Vego, Marko (1982). Postanak srednjovjekovne bosanske države [The becoming of the medieval Bosnian state] (in Serbo-Croatian). Sarajevo: Svjetlost. OCLC 461824314.
- Zlatar, Zdenko (2007). The poetics of Slavdom: the mythopoeic foundations of Yugoslavia. Peter Lang. ISBN 978-0-8204-8135-7.
