= Nikolić noble family =

Bosnian/Serbian noble family in medieval history

Nikolić
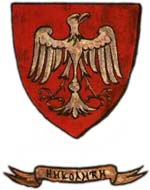
- Nikolić family coat of arms as depicted in so-called Illyrian armorials
- Country: Kingdom of Bosnia
- Founded: after 1363
- Titles: Knez, duke
- Estates: List: Neum's hinterland; Popovo field; Lower Neretva
- Dissolution: 1453 (last mention)

The Nikolić family was a Bosnian medieval noble family from Hum (later Herzegovina), today Bosnia and Herzegovina. The family's estate was in the western part of the Bosansko Primorje (transl. Bosnian Coast), namely Popovo Polje and Neum. They were of minor importance, serving under Grand Dukes of Bosnia and noble families of Hranić and Kosača, lords of Hum and later Herzegovina.

== History ==
The progenitor of the family was Nikola, a župan or knez. Nikola had two sons by Katarina, the daughter of Stephen I, Ban of Bosnia: Vladislav and Bogiša.

Little is known about the first ancestors of the Nikolić family, though they were most likely important family in Hum, with princess Vukosava, Petar and Miliša Nikolić probably being the second generation of the Nikolić family. The first mention of the Nikolić brothers happened after the death of King Tvrtko I of Bosnia in 1391. Loyal to the new Bosnian king, Stephen Dabiša, they were granted Republic of Dubrovnik citizenship by 1392. After the ascension of the rival king to Bosnian Kingdom throne, namely Stephen Ostoja, the Nikolić brothers, also related to Queen Jelena Gruba, who was of the House of Nikolić herself and the widow of Stephen Dabiša, were forced to take refuge in Dubrovnik.

Later, Vukosav participated in the Bosnian-Ragusan War around 1403 as a nobleman of the Grand Duke of Bosnia Sandalj Hranić, and was killed and buried in Ston on 28 November 1403.

Grgur Vukosalić, the son of Vukosav Nikolić, was present at historical events in Bosnia in the course of Tvrtko II's campaign against King Stephen Ostoja and his own lord and Grad Duke of Bosnia, Sandalj Hranić. To no avail, the Nikolić family tried to gain independence from the Bosnian duke, and after Hranić's death, they remained loyal to his successor as the Grad Duke of Bosnia, Stjepan Vukčić Kosača, as well. Grgur died in July 1436.

The sons of Grgur Vukosalić, Vuk and Vukašin Grgurević, maintained their position under Stjepan Vukčić Kosača, as the Grand Duke tried to overtake Zeta. In 1442 Vukasin fell into Venetian captivity, but with Dubrovnik help he was released. The last mention of the Nikolić family was in 1453, and they were still under the lordship of Stjepan Vukčić Kosača. The Ottoman Empire had already entered the area of Vrhbosna and prepared the conquest of the rest of the Bosnian Kingdom, which would occur 10 years later. Finally, after decades of political and social instability, Bosnia officially fell in 1463. Herzegovina would follow in 1482, with a Hungarian-backed reinstated Bosnian state around the former capital Jajce, being the last to succumb in 1527. After the end of the Bosnian medieval state, Nikolić's fate is little known.

== Members ==
Family tree

- Nikola, knez (župan)
  - Vladislav (fl. 1347–1363)
    - Vukosav Nikolić (fl. 1395–d. 1403),
      - Grgur Nikolić (fl. 1403–d. 1436), knez
        - Vuk Nikolić
        - Vukašin Nikolić
      - Radoje Nikolić, vojvoda
  - Bogiša

Unknown genealogy

- Miliša (fl. 1392)
- Jelena Gruba (ca. 1345–d. after March 18, 1399), Queen of Bosnia from 1391 to 1398, first as queen consort until 1395 and then as queen regnant.
