= Helen of Bosnia =

Queen regnant of Bosnia
- Reign: September 1395 – April 1398
- Predecessor: Dabiša
- Successor: Ostoja

Queen consort of Bosnia
- Tenure: 1391–95
- Born: c. 1345
- Died: after 18 March 1399
- Spouse: Dabiša, King of Bosnia
- House: Nikolić (by birth); Kotromanić (by marriage)

Helen (Serbo-Croatian: Jelena/Јелена; c. 1345 – after 18 March 1399), also known by the name Gruba/Груба, ruled the Kingdom of Bosnia from September 1395 until late April or early May 1398. She was queen consort as the wife of King Dabiša, and was chosen by the stanak to rule after his death. Whether she was a regent who ruled during an interregnum or a queen regnant is disputed, but in any case the real power was held by magnates of the kingdom. Her rule ended with the election of King Ostoja.

== Family ==
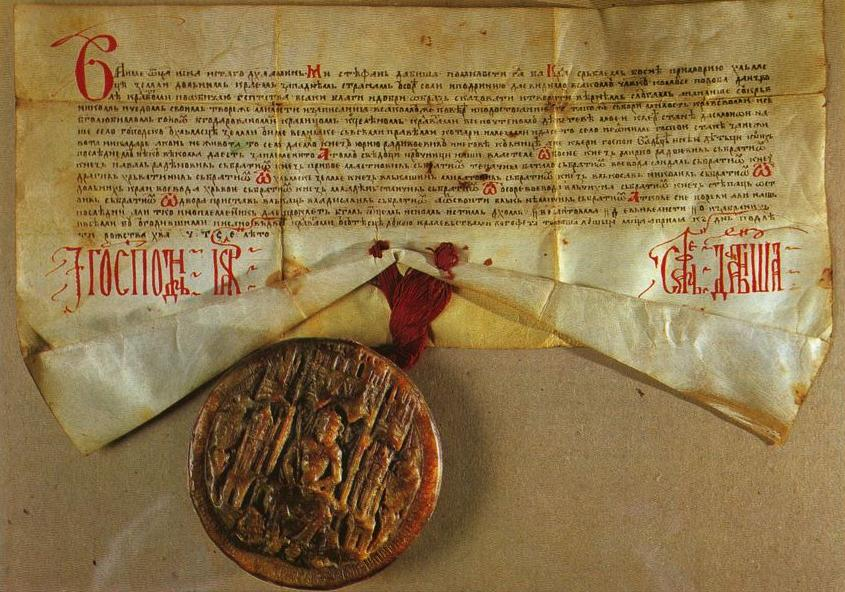
A charter issued by Dabiša and endorsed by Helen, granting the village Veljaci to their daughter Stana, to be inherited by her daughter Vladava and son-in-law Juraj Radivojević

Nothing is known for certain about Helen's origin. She was most likely a member of the Nikolić noble family from Zachlumia.

A charter dated 17 July 1392 is the earliest extant source naming Helen as queen and wife of Dabiša, who had succeeded Tvrtko I in March 1391, and places her at Dabiša's side in Lušci. As queen consort, Helen endorsed her husband's acts, and he emphasized in his charters that he had consulted with his wife. Queen Helen's family gained significant influence in state affairs during her husband's reign, as well as the right to collect the tribute of Ston from the Republic of Ragusa in 1393. The royal couple had a daughter named Stana, whose daughter Vladava married the nobleman Juraj Radivojević during Dabiša's lifetime.

== Rise ==
In 1394, Helen agreed to Dabiša's decision to designate King Sigismund of Hungary as his heir. When Dabiša died on 8 September the following year, however, the leading noblemen – Grand Duke Hrvoje Vukčić Hrvatinić, Prince Pavao Radinović, Duke Sandalj Hranić and Juraj Radivojević – refused to honor the agreement Dabiša had made with Sigismund. Sigismund raised an army and marched to nearby Syrmia with the aim to claim the Bosnian throne, but the noblemen convoked a stanak and elected Helen as Dabiša's successor. Not willing to engage the united nobility in war, Sigismund withdrew; the death of his wife Mary, heir of Hungary and cousin of Dabiša, made his position too precarious to attack Bosnia, as did the defeat by the Ottomans at the Battle of Nikopolis.

Historians have debated Queen Helen's role. Krunoslav Draganović emphasised in 1942 that she was a queen regnant rather than a regent. Sima Ćirković refuted this in 1964 and argued that the period of Helen's rule was actually an interregnum, a compromise meant to appease both Sigismund, who wanted to assert his rights to the throne but was unable to at the time, and the noblemen of Bosnia, who wanted to avoid honoring their pledge to Sigismund. Sigismund consented to Helen's assumption of power, and was asked by Ragusan officials to intercede with the Queen on their behalf. Ragusa eventually accepted that Helen would not confirm the charters granted by Bosnian monarchs to the Republic, apparently because she was not entitled to do so.

== Rule ==
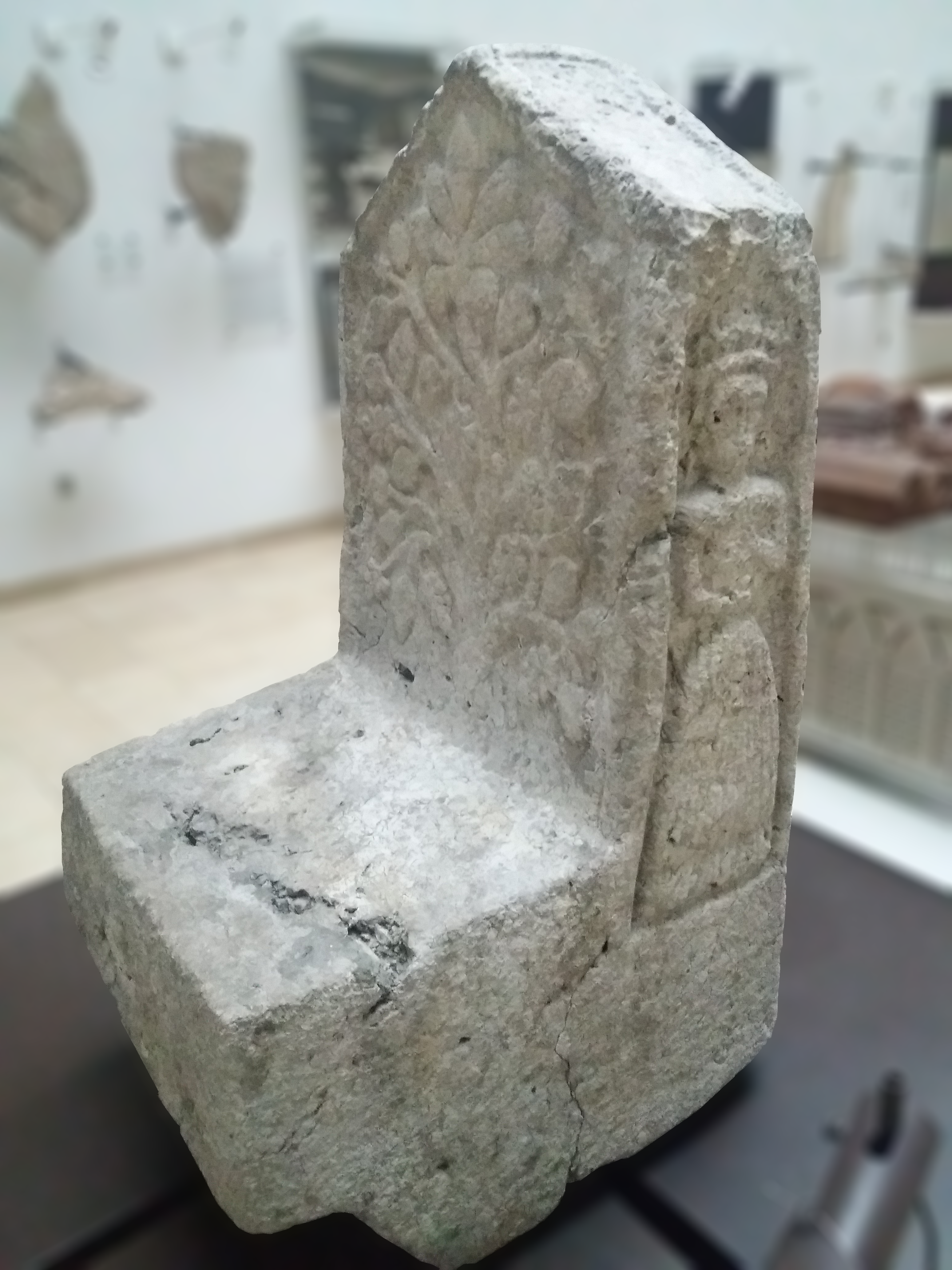
Royal and judge's seat of Queen Helen, who is depicted on its side

After the Battle of Nicopolis annihilated much of the Hungarian army, a pretender to the Bosnian throne staked his claim against Queen Helen. One of the nobleman supporting King Ladislaus of Naples's claim to Hungary, from the Slavonian town of Požega, started calling himself King of Bosnia. By mid-December 1395, Helen had successfully consolidated her grasp on the throne, and the pretender was killed by Sigismund's supporters in 1396, never having seriously threatened the Queen. Helen's rule stands out as the period during which Bosnian support for Ladislaus briefly waned.

Whatever Queen Helen's official role was meant to be, she functioned as a mere puppet of the nobility. All her surviving charters specifically note that they had been approved by the major noblemen. In a surviving charter, Queen Helen names "Duke Hrvoje Vukčić Hrvatinić, Prince Pavle Radenović, Duke Sandalj Hranić, and Tepčija Batalo" as the magnates whom she consulted. The emancipation of Bosnian nobility reached a peak during Helen's reign. Having become virtually autonomous, her vassals engaged in internal warfare which weakened the Kingdom and precluded its participation in regional politics.

The Ottoman Turks under Bayazid I were becoming a much greater threat during Helen's rule than during the reigns of Dabiša and Tvrtko I, helped by their decisive victory over the Serbian lord Vuk Branković, whose land had stood between Helen's and Bayazid's. The Ottoman army that arrived in Bosnia in January 1398, led by Bayazid's sons and the subjugated Serbian lord Stefan Lazarević, was larger than those defeated by Helen's predecessors in 1388 and 1392. The plundering expedition failed completely, however, due to a severe winter and deep snow in which many of Bayazid's soldiers perished.

== Deposition and aftermath ==
The Ottoman defeat did not mean Helen's triumph; by March 1398, Bosnia was beset by an internal strife. It seems that Helen's family, the Nikolić, attempted to take further advantage of their royal relations and free themselves from subordinacy to the House of Kosača and become immediate vassals of the monarch instead. This may have been the reason for an uprising against Helen. She maintained a great deal of support in April, when Ragusa paid its tribute to her. The last to remain on her side were the Radivojević family, including Helen's grandson-in-law Juraj. By 10 May 1398, however, her husband's kinsman Ostoja was enthroned as the new King of Bosnia. The deposition was opposed by her brothers and nephews. They were thus forced to take refuge in Ragusa, but Helen remained in Bosnia, where she was treated with honor due to a queen dowager.

During King Ostoja's reign, Helen resumed the name Gruba (likely her "folk name", as opposed to one from the calendar of saints) and retained the title of queen, but without the official royal style ("by the Grace of God Queen of Rascia, Bosnia, etc"). Gruba is last mentioned in a letter sent by Ragusan authorities on 18 March 1399. She may have died of an epidemic that plagued Hum at that time.

== Resting place ==
Helen's remains as well as of 11 other individuals were rediscovered in the remains of a church in the village of Vesela Straža near Bugojno in 2014 during construction work.

== Sources ==
- Ćirković, Sima (1964). Историја средњовековне босанске државе (in Serbo-Croatian). Srpska književna zadruga.
- Ćošković, Pejo (2005), "Jelena", Kotromanići (in Serbo-Croatian), Miroslav Krleža Institute of Lexicography
- Ćošković, Pejo (2009), Kotromanići (in Serbo-Croatian), Miroslav Krleža Institute of Lexicography
- Fine, John Van Antwerp (1994). The Late Medieval Balkans: A Critical Survey from the Late Twelfth Century to the Ottoman Conquest. University of Michigan Press. ISBN 0-472-08260-4.

Helen of Bosnia Nikolić
Regnal titles
Preceded by Dabiša	Queen regnant of Bosnia; 1395–1398	Succeeded by Ostoja
Royal titles
Vacant Title last held by Dorothea of Bulgaria	Queen consort of Bosnia; 1391–1395	Vacant Title next held by Vitača
