= Dabiša of Bosnia =

Dabiša
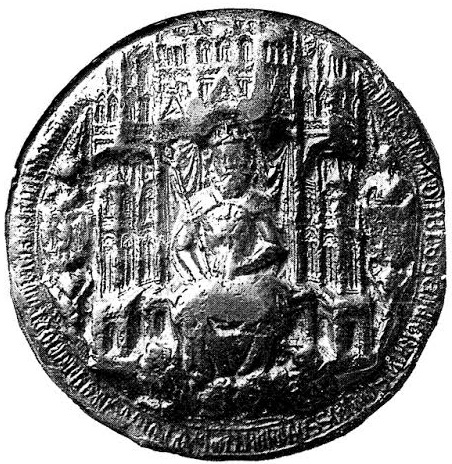
- Dabiša's 1395 seal

King of Bosnia
- Reign: March 1391 – 8 September 1395
- Predecessor: Tvrtko I
- Successor: Helen
- Died: 8 September 1395
- Burial: Bobovac
- Spouse: Helen of Bosnia
- House: Kotromanić
- Religion: Roman Catholic

Stephen Dabiša (Serbo-Croatian: Stjepan/Stefan Dabiša, Стјепан/Стефан Дабиша; Hungarian: Dabiša István; died on 8 September 1395) was as a member of the Kotromanić dynasty who reigned as King of Bosnia from March 1391 until his death. Elected to succeed the first king, Tvrtko I, Dabiša at first maintained the integrity of the Kingdom of Bosnia. He successfully resisted Hungary, Naples, and even Ottoman Turks. The latter part of his reign, however, saw the ascent of magnates and considerable loss of Bosnia's territory and influence.

== Background ==
Dabiša's relationship with the rest of the Kotromanić family is uncertain. In a letter, Dabiša called himself younger brother of Tvrtko I, who became Ban of Bosnia in 1353, but this should not be taken literally. He certainly was a relative of Tvrtko I though. Influenced by the writings of the 16th century Ragusan chronicler Mavro Orbini, modern historiography usually describes Dabiša as the illegitimate son of Ninoslav, who was the brother of Tvrtko's father Vladislav.

According to Orbini, Dabiša ruled the župa (county) of Neretva (corresponding to the area around the Upper Neretva and the town of Konjic) and, supporting Tvrtko's brother Vuk, took part in the rebellion that led to the deposition of Tvrtko in 1366. Dabiša, however, is the only rebel mentioned by Orbini whose name does not appear in contemporary accounts of the uprising. Tvrtko prevailed in 1367 and banished Dabiša, revoking his lands. Dabiša spent the following two decades in obscurity, while Tvrtko had himself crowned King of Bosnia in 1377.

== Election and initial success ==
Dabiša appears to have mended his relations with King Tvrtko I in the late 1380s, as he is recorded at royal court in Sutjeska in June 1390. Under unclear circumstances following Tvrtko's sudden death on 10 March 1391, Dabiša was elected king by the rusag. He immediately notified the authorities of the neighbouring republics of Venice and Ragusa, which recognized his accession on 1 and 15 June respectively, as well as the kings Sigismund of Hungary and Ladislaus of Naples. Following in his predecessor's footsteps, Dabiša took up using the royal name Stephen.

In the first years of his reign, Dabiša successfully maintained the integrity of Tvrtko's Kingdom of Bosnia, which included not only Bosnia proper, but also Croatia proper, Dalmatia, Zachlumia, and Rascia. The former two had been conquered from King Sigismund and Queen Mary of Hungary, and the Republic of Ragusa's immediate attempts to convince the Dalmatian cities to return to the fold of the Hungarian Crown ended in failure. Sigismund and Mary were not the only one claiming Dalmatia - or the Hungarian lands in general. Insisting that Dabiša did not support his bid for the Hungarian throne as effectively as his predecessor had, King Ladislaus of Naples started to enforce his own claim to Dalmatia and Croatia. Tvrtko I had professed to support Ladislaus when he expanded his realm to include those lands. Dabiša nevertheless remained at Ladislaus' side in his struggle against Sigismund.

From Tvrtko I, Dabiša also inherited the hostility of the Hungarian king, who strived to recover the territories lost to Tvrtko. Sigismund's wish to have his war against Bosnia equated to a crusade obtained Pope Boniface IX's approval. Dabiša was Roman Catholic, but a substantial population of his kingdom consisted of adherents of the Bosnian Church and the Serbian Orthodox Church, branded "heretics and schismatics" respectively in Sigismund's letter to Boniface. It is not known what came about this planned offensive. In the spring of 1392, Dabiša's troops defeated an Ottoman Turkish incursion, reminiscing Tvrtko's victory at the Battle of Bileća. Within a year, Dabiša and Sigismund had agreed to a truce.

== Signs of decline ==
While the Kingdom of Bosnia retained its standing among neighbouring states in the immediate aftermath of Tvrtko I's death, it was already during Dabiša's reign that conditions within the state started deteriorating. The nobility grew stronger and for the first time acted independently of the king, starting with the Zachlumian Sanković noble family. Dabiša curbed the Sanković power, but the trend was irreversible and eventually led to the weakening of the royal authority. Hrvoje Vukčić Hrvatinić, the kingdom's leading magnate, who governed Croatia on behalf of the Bosnian crown and in defiance of Hungarian claims, came into agreement with Sigismund and Mary but remained loyal to Dabiša. Dabiša and his other vassals were coming closer to an agreement with Sigismund as well, and the two kings were expected to make the Compromise of Đakovo in May 1393. In the end, the meeting did not take place.

By June 1394, King Dabiša was in open conflict with John Horvat, a fervent supporter of Ladislaus and enemy of Sigismund. He ordered that men from his islands of Brač, Hvar, and Korčula assist in the siege of Omiš, a city ruled by Horvat. Sigismund, who had been amassing an army since April, took advantage of the discord. The Battle of Dobor saw John Horvat's defeat and execution as well as destruction of the eponymous town on the river Bosna by Sigismund's troops. Soon thereafter, in a camp near the ruins of the town, Dabiša submitted to Sigismund. He resigned Croatia and Dalmatia to the Hungarian king and, with the agreement of his vassals, recognized him as his feudal overlord as well as heir designate to the Bosnian throne. It is not clear what prompted Dabiša to agree to such harsh terms. In return, as evident from a treaty issued in July 1394, Sigismund included Dabiša among the highest ranking Hungarian officials and named him ispán (count) of Somogy.

== Death and legacy ==
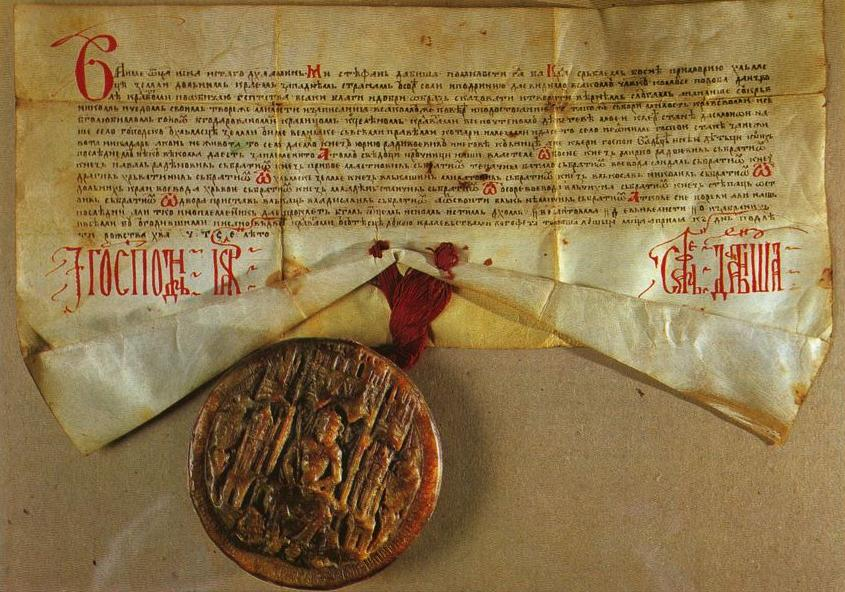
Charter by which Dabiša granted Veljaci to his daughter and her heirs

The agreement to recognize Sigismund as king following Dabiša indicates that the latter was by then of advanced age. Indeed, King Dabiša's health deteriorated in early 1395. At the end of March, writing from Bišće in Hum land, Dabiša requested that Ragusan authorities send a physician. The following month, in Sutjeska, he issued a charter granting the Zachlumian village of Veljaci to his daughter Stana, whose daughter Vladika was married to the nobleman Juraj Radivojević. He died on 8 September 1395. Despite initially consenting to his agreement with Sigismund, it was Dabiša's widow, Helen, who succeeded in ascending the throne with the support of the magnates.

Despite an auspicious start, Dabiša's reign ended with the Kingdom of Bosnia displaying first signs of decay. Much of Tvrtko's extraordinary legacy was lost in the summer of 1394, and the state resumed its previous boundaries. Dabiša left the Bosnian state more dependent on Hungary than ever before, and the kingdom's influence in the Balkans waned.

== Bibliography ==
- Ćirković, Sima (1964). Историја средњовековне босанске државе (in Serbo-Croatian). Srpska književna zadruga.
- Ćošković, Pejo (2009), "Dabiša (Stjepan Dabiša)", Kotromanići (in Serbo-Croatian), Miroslav Krleža Institute of Lexicography
- Engel, Pál (1996). Magyarország világi archontológiája, 1301–1457, I. [Secular Archontology of Hungary, 1301–1457, Volume I] (in Hungarian). História, MTA Történettudományi Intézete. ISBN 963-8312-44-0.
- Fine, John Van Antwerp Jr. (1994). The Late Medieval Balkans: A Critical Survey from the Late Twelfth Century to the Ottoman Conquest. Michigan: University of Michigan Press. ISBN 0-472-08260-4.

Regnal titles
Preceded by Tvrtko I	King of Bosnia; 1391–1395	Succeeded by Helen
Preceded by Tvrtko I	— DISPUTED — King of Croatia and Dalmatia; 1391–1394; Disputed by Mary and Sigismund	Succeeded by Mary and Sigismund as undisputed rulers
Political offices
Preceded by ?	Count of Neretva c. 1366	Succeeded by Sanko Mladenović
Preceded by Stephen Lackfi	Count of Somogy; 1394–1395	Succeeded by Stephen Kanizsai
