= Juraj Radivojević =

15th century Bosnian nobleman

Juraj or Đurađ Radivojević (Serbian Cyrillic: Јурај/Ђурађ Радивојевић; died after 1408) was a Bosnian nobleman. He was knez (lord) in Krajina Makareka, serving Queen Helen (r. 1395–1398). He was a son of Radivoje, a member of the Vukčić noble family, which served the Kingdom of Bosnia in Zahumlje.

He married Vladava, the daughter of King Dabiša and Queen Helen's daughter Stana.
