= Bosnian–Ragusan war of 1403–1404 =

Bosnian–Ragusan War
Date	1403–1404
Location	Adriatic Coast
Result	Ragusan victory: Retreat of the Bosnian Army

Belligerents
Kingdom of Bosnia	Republic of Ragusa

Commanders and leaders
Vukosav Nikolić †; Radič Sanković (POW)	Sandalj Hranić; Duke of Slano †

Strength
Unknown	Unknown

Casualties and losses
Unknown	Unknown

Bosnian–Ragusan War (1403–1404), sometimes called Second Bosnian–Ragusan War, was a military conflict fought between the Kingdom of Bosnia and the Republic of Ragusa between 1403 and 1404, which ended with a treaty signed officially in 1405. In 1403, Stephen Ostoja of Bosnia sided with King Ladislaus of Naples in his plights against the Hungarian King Sigismund, Bosnia's liege. King Ostoja led a war against Ragusa, at the time an ally of Hungary.

Radič Sanković led the attacks on Dubrovnik in the name of Stephen Ostoja. Sandalj Hranić captured and blinded Radič, and held him in prison until his death in 1404. Among the fallen noblemen were Vukosav Nikolić and the Duke of Slano, whose name has been unfortunately lost to time.

The Ragusans set fire to Šumet and Žrnovnica, so the Bosnian army retreated.
