= Vatnica =

Medieval župa of Hum, Bosnia and Herzegovina

Coordinates: 42.8918127°N 18.3310318°E

Vatnica (Serbo-Croatian: Ватница) was a medieval župa (parish) first mentioned in the early 14th century as Vetanica (Ветаница) as part of Banate of Bosnia, and kingdom from 1377, and after its fall to Ottoman Empire, as part of Hercegovina (cca. 1468-83). It was located in a deep valley between Berkovići and Bileća in south-eastern Bosnia and Herzegovina. It was described as part of Travunija. It was transformed into the Ottoman nahiya of Fatnica (Фатница) in the 15th century.
