= Radivojević noble family =

Radivojević Vlatković
- Noble house
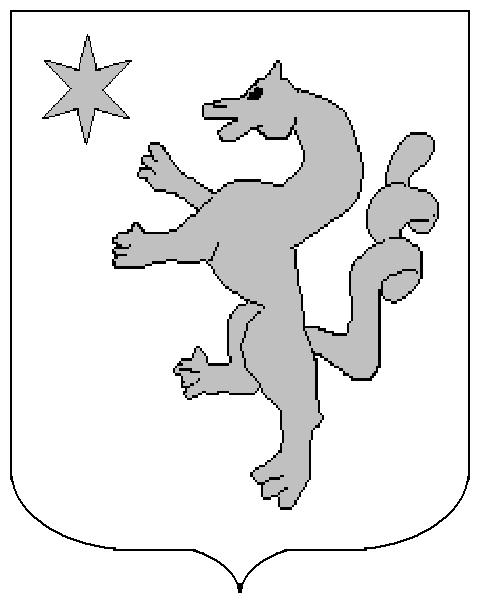
- Coat of arms of the Jurjević branch of Radivojević family
- Parent house: Radivojević
- Country: Banate of Bosnia & Kingdom of Bosnia
- Etymology: patronymic
- Final head: .
- Seat: .
- Titles: Knyazs later Dukes
- Estates: in western Hum and Krajina between the rivers Cetina and Neretva; around Imotski and Posušje
- Dissolution: 1463 most likely with Ottoman conquest
- Cadet branches: Jurjević; Vlatković

The Radivojević family, later known as Vlatković and Jurjević, were a prominent Bosnian nobility during the 14th and 15th century.

== History ==
The first known representative was a certain Bogavac from the 14th century. He had two sons: knez Radivoj and knez Mrdeša Bogavčić. Bogavac's successor in the leadership of the family was Radivoj. While Mrdeša had no descendants, Radivoj had two sons, knez Juraj and knez Vukić Radivojević. The next in succession to lead the family was Duke Juraj Radivojević, and after him his son Duke Vlatko Jurjević, and then Vlatko's son Duke Ivaniš Vlatković. The Bogavčić–Radivojević–Jurjević–Vlatković family had its estates on the right bank of the Lower Neretva, west to Cetina, in the hinterland of Biokovo all the way north to Čabulja. Duke Juraj Radivojević and Duke Ivaniš Vlatković are among the strongest representatives of the family, which was the strongest clan in Humska zemlja under their overlords Kosača noble family.

They were vassals to Kosače, who were the lords of the southeastern region of Kingdom of Bosnia at the time, and with whom the family often quarreled for the reason of growing Kosače arbitrariness as they tried to gain and deepen their autonomy from Bosnia royal dominion. Members of Radivojević were participants in King Tomaš's engagements in restoration of royal authority over Kosače domains, and in particular over the towns of Drijeva and Blagaj. Religious situation on the land controlled by the family was ambiguous, and not much different from other territories under medieval Bosnian state. Religious representation very much depended on era, with different family generation being involved with either Catholicism and-or Bosnian Church as the political circumstances shifted and a situation on the ground demanded it.

== Genealogy ==
- Bogavac
  - Radivoj Bogavčić
    - Juraj Radivojević
      - Vlatko Jurjević
      - Ivaniš Vlatković Before the fall of Bosnia under Ottoman rule, the last Bosnian king Stjepan Tomašević sent his wife to Split. She was accompanied by several dignitaries, including Knez Ivaniš Vlatković. After arriving in Croatia, he continued the war with the Ottomans, first stopping in Klis, and after the fall of Klis, he went to Senj. His grandsons, Radoje and Vukan Vlatković, gained numerous merits in the war with the Ottomans, and this fact will also lead to the confirmation of nobility.
    - Vukić Radivojević
  - Mrdeša Bogavčić

== Bibliography ==
- Ćošković, Pejo (2009). "KOSAČE". hbl.lzmk.hr. Hrvatski biografski leksikon.
- Zilić, Adis (2021). "Vjerska opredjeljenja". Radivojevići-Vlatkovići vlastela Humske zemlje i Krajine [Radivojevićs-Vlatkovićs, The nobility of the Humska land and Krajina] (PDF) (Monographies ed.). Sarajevo: iis.unsa.ba. ISBN 978-9958-649-43-1.
