= Vitača =

Bosnian queen

Vitača (Serbian Cyrillic: Витача) was Queen consort of Bosnia as the first wife of King Stephen Ostoja of Bosnia.

Vitača married Ostoja, the illegitimate son of King Tvrtko I of Bosnia, before his accession to the throne of Bosnia. Ostoja was a member of the Bosnian Church and Vitača was most likely a member of that church as well. It is unknown whether they had any children.

Vitača became queen when her husband was elected to succeed Jelena Gruba in 1399. Vitača, however, was not related to the powerful nobility of Bosnia - in fact, she may have been a commoner. Ostoja divorced her, either by his own choice, or due to the pressure to make a useful political marriage. He was able to do this because, unlike Roman Catholic churches, the Bosnian Church permitted divorce.

Though, Ostoja referred to her as his wife in a letter he wrote to the people of Dubrovnik, dated February of 1399, by September of 1399 the Ragusans referred to Vitača as the repudiated wife of the King of Bosnia. The Ragusans kept correspondence with the ex-queen Vitača for some time after her divorce.

Following his divorce from Vitača, Ostoja married Kujava Radinović, who, sixteen years later, he divorced in turn.

Royal titles
Vacant Title last held by Jelena Gruba	Queen consort of Bosnia; 1399	Vacant Title next held by Kujava Radinović
