= Kingdom of Bosnia =

1377–1463 kingdom in Southeast Europe

Kingdom of Bosnia Bosansko kraljevstvo Босанско краљевство
- 1377–1463
- Royal banner of king Tvrtko I Coat of arms

- Expansion of Bosnia (1180-1391)
- Capital: Visoko; Jajce; Bobovac; 44°08′13″N 18°14′16″E
- Religion: Catholicism (official) Bosnian Church Eastern Orthodoxy
- Demonym: Bosnian
- Government: Feudal monarchy
- King
  - 1377–1391: Tvrtko I (first)
  - 1461–1463: Stephen Tomašević (last)
- Historical era: Middle Ages
  - Coronation of Tvrtko I: 26 October 1377
  - Ottoman conquest: 25 May 1463
- Currency: Bosnian Golden Coin
Preceded by	Succeeded by
Banate of Bosnia	Sanjak of Bosnia

The Kingdom of Bosnia (Serbo-Croatian: Kraljevina Bosna / Краљевина Босна), or Bosnian Kingdom (Bosansko kraljevstvo / Босанско краљевство), was a medieval kingdom that lasted for nearly a century, from 1377 to 1463, and evolved out of the Banate of Bosnia, which itself lasted from at least 1154.

King Tvrtko I (r. 1353–91) acquired portions of western Serbia and most of the Adriatic coast south of the Neretva River. During the late part of his reign, Bosnia became one of the strongest states in the Balkan Peninsula. However, feudal fragmentation remained important in Bosnia and the Bosnian nobility held significant power, exercising it at the Stanak meetings where members deliberated on matters such as election of the new king or queen and coronations, foreign policy, sale or cession of territory, contracting and signing treaties with neighboring countries, and military issues.

The Ottoman Empire annexed portions of eastern Bosnia in the 1440s and 1450s and went on to conquer Hum, by then renamed to Herzegovina, with the last fortress, Novi, falling in December 1481. Stephen Tomašević, the last king of Bosnia, was captured by the Ottomans and killed in 1463.

The overwhelming majority of the population was rural, with few significant urban centers. Among the more notable towns were Doboj, Jajce, Srebrenik, Srebrenica, Tešanj, and Podvisoki. Mining, especially for silver, was a major source of income for Bosnian kings.

== Background ==
The Banate of Bosnia was a medieval state comprising, at its peak, most of what is today Bosnia and Herzegovina, as well as parts of Dalmatia (in Croatia), Serbia, and Montenegro. Although nominally belonging to the Kingdom of Hungary crown lands, it was a de facto independent state. After the reign of Ban Kulin, rulers of Bosnia enjoyed virtual independence from Hungary, and although they formally held a vassal position for much of this time, in reality they managed to maintain independent functions and even expand their rule in Serbia, Croatia, and Dalmatia.

The Banate of Bosnia existed until 1377, when it was elevated into a kingdom through the Serbian crown coronation of Tvrtko I, held at the Serbian Orthodox Mileševa Monastery before the relics of Saint Sava of Serbia, following the death of the last Serbian Emperor from the Nemanjić dynasty, Stefan Uroš V, who died childless and without an heir in 1371.

=== Coronation of Tvrtko ===
Tvrtko had the strongest claim to the royal title at that time, and even if he had no practical means to rule Serbia, it allowed him to elevate Bosnia to a kingdom, as this would imply more formal independence. Tvrtko thus proclaimed himself the first King of Bosnia, claiming full legitimacy as the crown he took was sent from Pope Honorius III to Stefan the First-Crowned in 1217. A Serbian logothete named Blagoje, having found refuge at Tvrtko's court, attributed to Tvrtko the right to a "double crown": one for Bosnia, and the other for the Serbian lands of his Nemanjić ancestors. He was also King of Serbia, and in that way, legal basis for crowning was achieved, which was promoted even by his formal sovereign Louis I. Tvrtko's title as a king was also approved by Louis's successor, and Tvrtko's cousin, Mary, Queen of Hungary. Venice and Ragusa consistently referred to Tvrtko as King of Rascia, Ragusa even complaining, in 1378, about Tvrtko's preoccupation with his new kingdom. Tvrtko's coronation as King of Bosnia and Serbia was held in the fall of 1377 (probably 26 October, the feast day of Saint Demetrius), and marked a significant event of Bosnian medieval history, although contemporary sources about the coronation are very rare. The Royal Charter issued to the Ragusan commune on 10 April 1378 stands as one of the key sources for understanding the position of medieval Bosnian banate and its transformation to the kingdom, as well as information about economic activity between Bosnia and Ragusa, and proof of Bosnian independence.

=== Stanak ===
Feudal fragmentation remained important feature in Bosnia and the Bosnian nobility held significant power, exercising it at the Stanak meetings. The Stanak is the most common name used to refer to the assembly of nobility in medieval Bosnia, and it is first attested in the charter of Tvrtko I in 1354. Its influence peaked between the 1390s and the 1420s. The existence of the stanak proved a unity and feeling of belonging to a Bosnian identity and integrity, but also it illustrated weakness of the monarch and decentralization of the state.

The right to take part in the sessions of the stanak was enjoyed by every Bosnian knez, from magnates to petty lords, collectively known as vlastela, but the ultimate authority belonged to the highest nobility. The stanak was convoked when required, usually by the ruler, who presided over it and led its sessions. If male, his wife was allowed to attend, but his children were not. The Bosnian Church clergy, not belonging to the vlastela, were also barred, but influenced decision-making in the stanak through the great lords associated with them. The magnates of the country convoked the stanak themselves when the country experienced greater domestic issues, such as succession crisis or deposition of the ruler, domestic conflicts or wars. It normally took place wherever the monarch held court: in Mile, Milodraž, Bobovac, Kraljeva Sutjeska and Jajce.

The Stanak enjoyed power and authority on all matters, including election of the new king or queen and coronation, foreign policy, sale or cession of territory, contracting and signing treaties with neighboring countries, and military issues. Charters issued by monarchs reflected the decisions made by the stanak; as the royal power weakened, that of stanak increased.

=== International recognition ===
Hungarian rulers perceived Bosnia as a country under their sovereignty during medieval time. Bosnian rulers acted completely independently in carrying out state and diplomatic affairs, governing the judicial system, granting towns and estates, minting coins, exploiting natural resources, and making trading agreements with other countries and independent cities.

As a main trading partner of the Bosnian state, Ragusa referred to the Bosnian Kingdom as a separate state ("rusag"), for example in a charter issued to Sandalj Hranić in November 1405, where they articulated that Ragusan merchants would be safe across the "Bosnian rusag", or 1451, during the war with Stjepan Vukčić, as a "Holy Kingdom". Ragusans also paid Saint Demetrius an income of 2000 Ragusan perpera. Ladislaus of Naples acknowledged the territories of the kingdom on 26 August 1406 at the request of Tvrtko II.

== History ==
=== Tvrtko's I ascension and reign ===
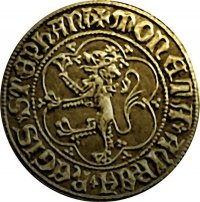
Golden coin minted during the reign of Tvrtko I

Bosnian Kingdom at the time of Tvrtko's death in 1391.

Bosnia reached its peak under Tvrtko I, a member of the Kotromanić dynasty, who came to power in 1353. In 1372, Tvrtko formed an alliance with Prince Lazar Hrebeljanović, one of the regional lords in the territory of the disintegrated Serbian Empire. The next year, Tvrtko and Lazar attacked the domain of Nikola Altomanović, the most powerful Serbian noble at the time. After defeating Altomanović, they divided his lands, except for his littoral districts of Dračevica, Konavle, and Trebinje, which were seized by Đurađ I Balšić, the Lord of Zeta. Tvrtko received parts of Zahumlje, the upper reaches of the Drina and Lim rivers, and the districts of Onogošt and Gacko. This acquisition included the important Serbian Orthodox monastery of Mileševa, which held the relics of Saint Sava, the first Serbian Archbishop.

In 1377, Tvrtko took the littoral districts from Balšić. That year, on 26 October, he was crowned King of "The Serbs, Bosnia, the Primorje (Seaside), and the western lands". The acquisition of Serbian territory, including the important Monastery of Mileševa, combined with the fact that Tvrtko's grandmother had been a member of the Nemanjić dynasty, prompted Tvrtko into having himself crowned King of Serbia, thus asserting his pretensions to the Serbian throne. This was made possible by the royal Nemanjić line having died out with Uroš in 1371. The crown was sent to him by Hungarian king Louis of Anjou. According to a plurality of recent works from scholars like Čošković, Anđelić, Lovrenović, and Filipović, the ceremony itself was conducted in Mile near Visoko in the church that was built during Stephen II Kotromanić's reign, where he was also buried alongside his uncle Stjepan II. In contrast, some earlier historiographers, mostly represented by western scholars, consider that he was crowned in the Orthodox Monastery of Mileševa by the Metropolitan of Mileševa.

After the defeat of Altomanović, Lazar was the most powerful lord on the territory of the former Serbian Empire. He wanted to reunite the Serbian state, and the Serbian Orthodox Church saw him as the best suited to succeed the Nemanjić dynasty. The Church, which was the strongest cohesive force among the Serbs at the time, did not support Tvrtko's aspirations in this regard.

By 1390, Tvrtko had expanded his realm to include a part of Croatia and Dalmatia, and expanded his title to "King of The Serbs, Bosnia, Dalmatia, Croatia and the Littoral". Tvrtko's full title listed subject peoples and geographical dependencies, following the Byzantine norm. At the peak of his power, he was "King of Bosnia, Serbia, Croatia, Hum, Usora, Soli, Dalmatia, and Donji Kraji".

In the last months of his reign, Tvrtko devoted himself to solidifying his position in Dalmatia and to plans for taking Zadar, the only Dalmatian city that had evaded his rule. He offered an extensive alliance to Venice, but it did not suit the republic's interests. Meanwhile, Tvrtko was also fostering relations with Albert III, Duke of Austria. By the late summer of 1390, a marriage was expected to be contracted between the recently widowed King and a member of the Austrian ruling family, the Habsburgs. The Hungarian kingdom remained the focus of Tvrtko's foreign policy, however. Although they did not recognize each other as kings, Tvrtko and Hungarian King Sigismund started negotiating a peace in September. Sigismund was in the weaker position and likely ready to make concessions to Tvrtko when his ambassadors arrived at Tvrtko's court in January 1391. The negotiations were probably never concluded, as Tvrtko died on 10 March.

=== Death of Tvrtko I and decline ===
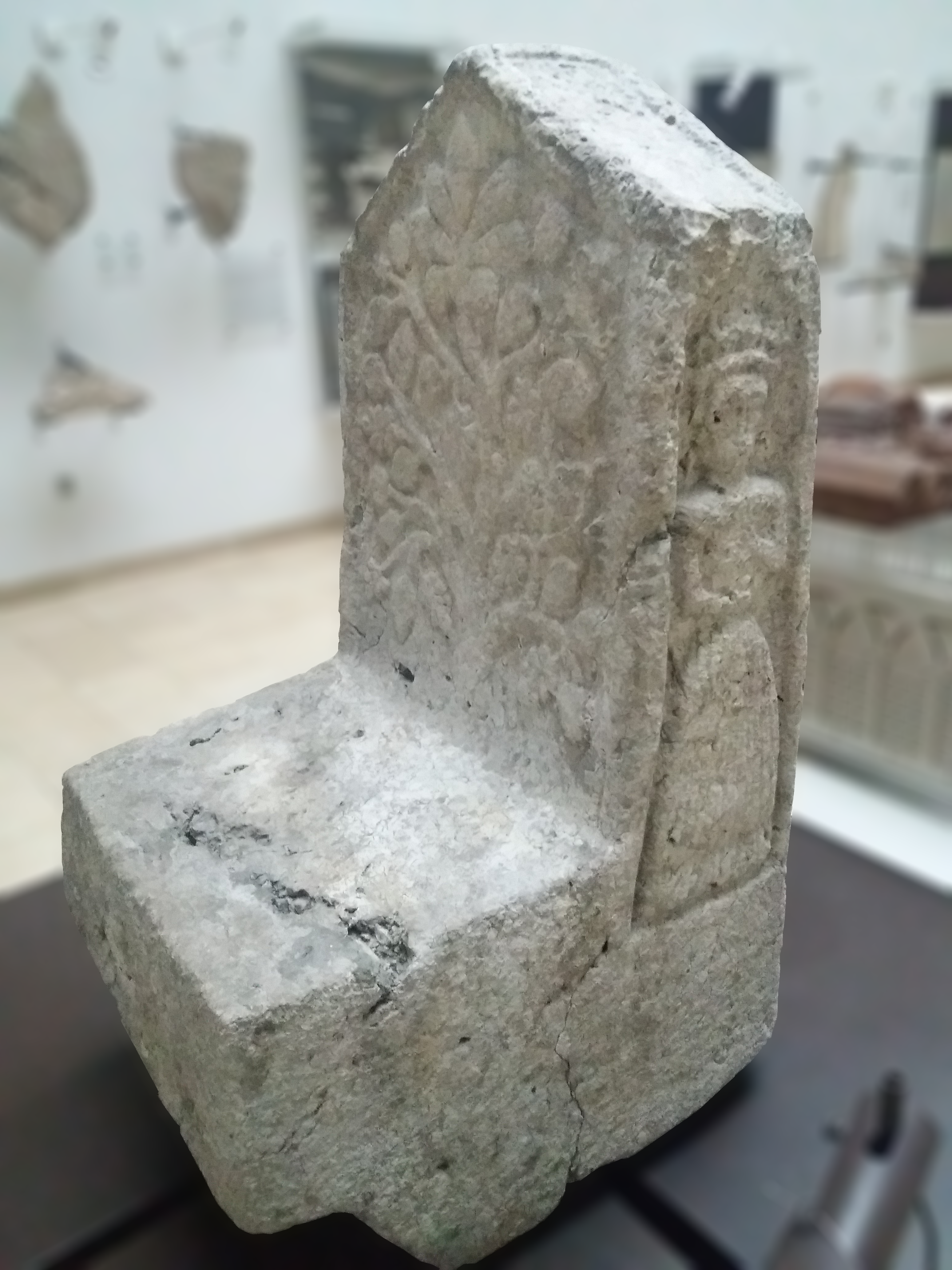
Royal and judge's seat of Queen Helen, who is depicted on its side

While Bosnia retained its standing among neighboring states in the immediate aftermath of Tvrtko's death, during Dabiša's reign conditions within the state started deteriorating. He successfully resisted his sovereigns from Hungary, Naples, and even Ottoman Turks. In the first years of his reign, Dabiša successfully maintained the integrity of the Kingdom.

The latter part of his reign, however, saw the ascent of magnates and considerable loss of territories and influence. The nobility grew stronger and for the first time acted independently of the king, starting with the Zachlumian Sanković noble family. Dabiša curbed the Sanković power, but the trend was irreversible and eventually led to the weakening of the royal authority. Hrvoje Vukčić Hrvatinić, the kingdom's leading magnate, came into agreement with Sigismund and Mary but remained loyal to Dabiša. By June 1394, Dabiša was in open conflict with John Horvat, a fervent supporter of Ladislaus and enemy of Sigismund. He ordered that men from his islands of Brač, Hvar, and Korčula assist in the siege of Omiš, a city ruled by Horvat. Sigismund, who had been amassing an army since April, took advantage of the discord.

The Battle of Dobor saw Horvat's defeat and execution as well as the destruction of the eponymous town on the river Bosna by Sigismund's troops. Soon thereafter Dabiša submitted to Sigismund and resigned Croatia and Dalmatia to the Hungarian king and, with the agreement of his vassals, recognized him as his feudal overlord as well as heir designate to the Bosnian throne. It is not clear what prompted Dabiša to agree to such harsh terms. In return, as evident from a treaty issued in July 1394, Sigismund included Dabiša among the highest ranking Hungarian officials and named him ispán (count) of Somogy.

Despite an auspicious start, Dabiša's reign ended with the kingdom displaying the first signs of decay. Much of Tvrtko's extraordinary legacy was lost in the summer of 1394, and the state resumed its previous boundaries. Dabiša left the state more dependent on Hungarian kings than ever before, and the kingdom's influence in the Balkans waned.

In 1394, Dabiša's wife Helen agreed to Dabiša's decision to designate Sigismund as his heir. When Dabiša died on 8 September the following year, however, the leading noblemen – Grand Duke Hrvoje Vukčić Hrvatinić, Prince Pavao Radinović, Duke Sandalj Hranić, and Juraj of Radivojević's – refused to honor the agreement Dabiša had made with Sigismund. Sigismund raised an army and marched to nearby Syrmia to claim the Bosnian throne, but the noblemen convoked a stanak, an assembly of noblemen, and elected Helen as Dabiša's successor. Not willing to engage the united nobility in war, Sigismund withdrew; the death of his wife Mary, heir of Hungary and cousin of Dabiša, made his position too precarious to attack in Bosnia, as did the defeat by the Ottomans at the Battle of Nicopolis. By mid-December 1395, Helen had consolidated her grasp on the throne, and the pretender was killed by Sigismund's supporters in 1396, never having seriously threatened the Queen. The emancipation of Bosnian nobility reached a peak during Helen's reign. Having become virtually autonomous, her vassals engaged in internal warfare, which weakened Bosnia and precluded its participation in regional politics.

By March 1398, Bosnia was beset by internal strife. It seems that Helen's family, the Nikolić, attempted to take further advantage of their royal relations and free themselves from subordinacy to the House of Kosača to become immediate vassals of the monarch. This may have been the reason for an uprising against Helen. She maintained a great deal of support in April, when Ragusa paid its tribute to her. The last to remain on her side were the Radivojević noble family, including Helen's grandson-in-law Juraj. By 10 May, however, her husband's kinsman Ostoja was enthroned as the new King of Bosnia.

=== Ostoja's and Tvrtko's II infighting ===
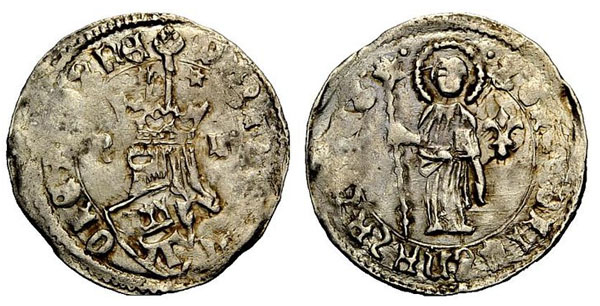
Coin of Tvrtko II

Ostoja was brought to power by the forces of Hrvoje Vukčić, who deposed Helen in 1398. In 1403 he sided with King Ladislaus of Naples against Sigismund. Ostoja led a war against the Republic of Dubrovnik, a Hungarian vassalage. In 1404, the Bosnian nobles under Hrvoje Vukčić replaced him with his brother Tvrtko II because of his pro-Hungarian views. He had to flee to Hungary after a stanak in Mile, Visoko. Ostoja tried to reclaim the throne with Hungarian support, but, in June 1404, Tvrtko's supporters defeated a Hungarian army and thus prevented Ostoja from reclaiming the crown, although the chief royal residence of Bobovac and the Usoran town of Srebrenik were captured and restored to Ostoja. All major noble families remained loyal to Tvrtko, while Ostoja functioned as Sigismund's puppet whose territory included little more than Bobovac. The fortress, however, housed the crown, which Tvrtko was not able to reach.

Following a few minor disputes with the maritime republics of Venice and Ragusa over Konavli and Pomorje, Tvrtko gained recognition as the legitimate king from both states. By 1406, Ostoja was losing what little support he had left in Bosnia, with the nobility now unanimously favouring Tvrtko, but the former king's decision to remain in the country continued to trouble Tvrtko. Ragusans described the beginning of Tvrtko's reign as more tumultuous than anything "since the Flood", but he soon succeeded in uniting the country by bringing together his feuding vassals.

Hungarian attacks on Bosnia took place annually, making Tvrtko's life "a constant hassle". In 1408, Sigismund defeated the Bosnian nobility and Tvrtko and in 1409 he restored Ostoja to the throne. One hundred and seventy minor noblemen were captured and killed in Dobor by being tossed over the city walls. Tvrtko is said to have been captured as well, but this does not appear to be true, as he demanded the customary tribute from the Ragusans in February 1409. The hostilities continued until the end of November, with Tvrtko retreating southwards with his noblemen and resisting Hungarian attacks, which enabled Ostoja to reestablish control over Central Bosnia.

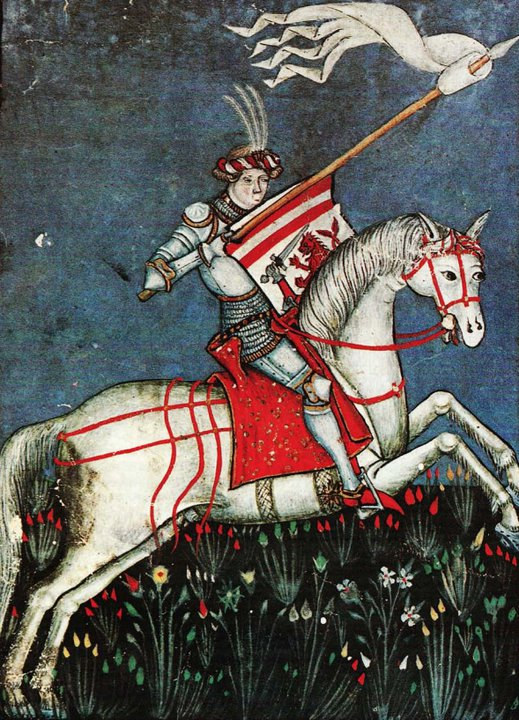
Hrvoje Vukčić Hrvatinić, depicted in Hrvoje's Missal

Tvrtko remained on the throne until mid-1409, when Ostoja prevailed. Sigismund's claim became untenable, but Bosnians acknowledged his overlordship over Ostoja; only Tvrtko refused to submit to the King of Hungary. He appears to have evaded capture by Hungarian troops by fleeing to the mountains of northern Zachlumia. Ostoja ended the decade-long dispute with the Hungarians by recognizing the suzerainty of the Hungarian crown and, in 1412, visiting the Hungarian throne in Buda with the rest of the Bosnian and Serbian nobility including Serbian Despot Stefan Lazarević. After that Tvrtko faded into obscurity and had no part in Bosnian affairs for several years.

=== Second reign of Tvrtko II and rising Ottoman influence ===
The first Ottoman troops attacked Bosnia in May 1414; in August they also brought the deposed monarch, Tvrtko, and set him up as anti-king. His alliance with the Ottomans may have been due to their mutual hostility towards Sigismund. Pavle Radenović immediately declared for Tvrtko, but no other major nobleman appears to have followed his example – not even Hrvoje. While Tvrtko hoped for an Ottoman victory, Ostoja expected that a Hungarian triumph would rid him of Ottoman raiders and secure his position against both his rival and his ambitious magnates. The Battle of Doboj in August 1415 saw the disastrous defeat of Sigismund's army. Contrary to expectations, however, the Ottomans recognized Ostoja as the legitimate king. Tvrtko lost his ground, while the united Bosnians for the first time shifted their allegiance from the Hungarian crown to the Ottoman Sultanate.

Ostoja died in September 1418. Despite expectations that Tvrtko would take over, Ostoja's son Stephen was elected king. When the Ottomans invaded Bosnia in early 1420, Tvrtko once again accompanied them and installed himself as anti-king. Sandalj immediately declared for him. Fearing the Ottomans, Sandalj's example was soon followed by other noblemen. In June Tvrtko convoked a stanak, and Ragusa recognized him as king. He had the support of almost all of the nobility in Visoko, including duke Vukmir, mayor Dragiša, knez Juraj Vojsalić, knez Pribić, knez Radič Radojević, knez Batić Mirković, knez Juraj Dragičević, knez Petar Klešić, duke Ivko, and duke Pavao Jurjević. By the end of the year, Tvrtko had completely ousted Stephen, who continued to advance his claim until the summer of 1421. He appears to have died soon after.

Internal troubles forced the Ottomans to withdraw their troops from Bosnia, which enabled Tvrtko to strengthen his hold on the kingdom and for its economy to recover. Tvrtko's second accession had to be legitimized with a new coronation, which took place during a stanak in August 1421. Tvrtko's second reign was marked by his quick resolution to restore royal authority and the king's pre-eminence among Bosnia's feudal rulers. With Hrvoje and Pavle gone, and Sandalj preoccupied by conflict with Pavle's sons, Tvrtko was able to significantly expand the royal domain. In December 1422 Tvrtko signed a beneficial trade treaty with the Republic of Venice and discussed plans for joint military action against Sigismund in Dalmatia. Tvrtko's association with Venice bothered not only Ragusa, but also the Ottoman Turks; the former resented losing their monopoly on trade, while the latter's poor relationship with Venice was the result of territorial disputes over Albania and Zeta. Ottomans proceeded to raid Bosnia in the spring of 1424 to make it clear to Tvrtko that close relations with Venice would not be tolerated. Tvrtko understood that Venice would not be able to provide him with help against the Ottomans, and thus slowly dismantled their alliance. In 1425, Tvrtko realized that he needed a strong ally in the event of further Ottoman attacks. The Ottomans responded with severe attacks that forced Tvrtko to accept their suzerainty and to agree to pay an annual tribute.

In 1432, Stefan Lazarević's successor Đurađ, Sandalj, and the Ottomans helped Radivoj, the elder illegitimate son of the long-deceased Ostoja, to lay claim to the throne and take control of much of the country. Tvrtko's only noteworthy support came from Hrvoje's nephew and successor, Juraj Vojsalić, and he managed to retain only central and northwestern Bosnia. Tvrtko retreated to Visoko, but soon found that Sandalj had become too ill to support Radivoj's cause. After years of pleading for their help, Tvrtko finally saw Hungarians march into Bosnia in mid-1434. They recovered for him Jajce, Hodidjed, Bočac and the Komotin Castle, but he lost it all as soon as they retreated. In fact, he himself appears to have left with the troops on their way back to Hungary, as he is known to have resided at the court in Buda in 1435. Radivoj ceased being a threat when he lost Ottoman support that year, while Sandalj's death presented Tvrtko with a new and more vital rebellious vassal in the form of Sandalj's nephew and successor, Stjepan Vukčić Kosača.

=== Death of Tvrtko II and Thomas's ascension ===
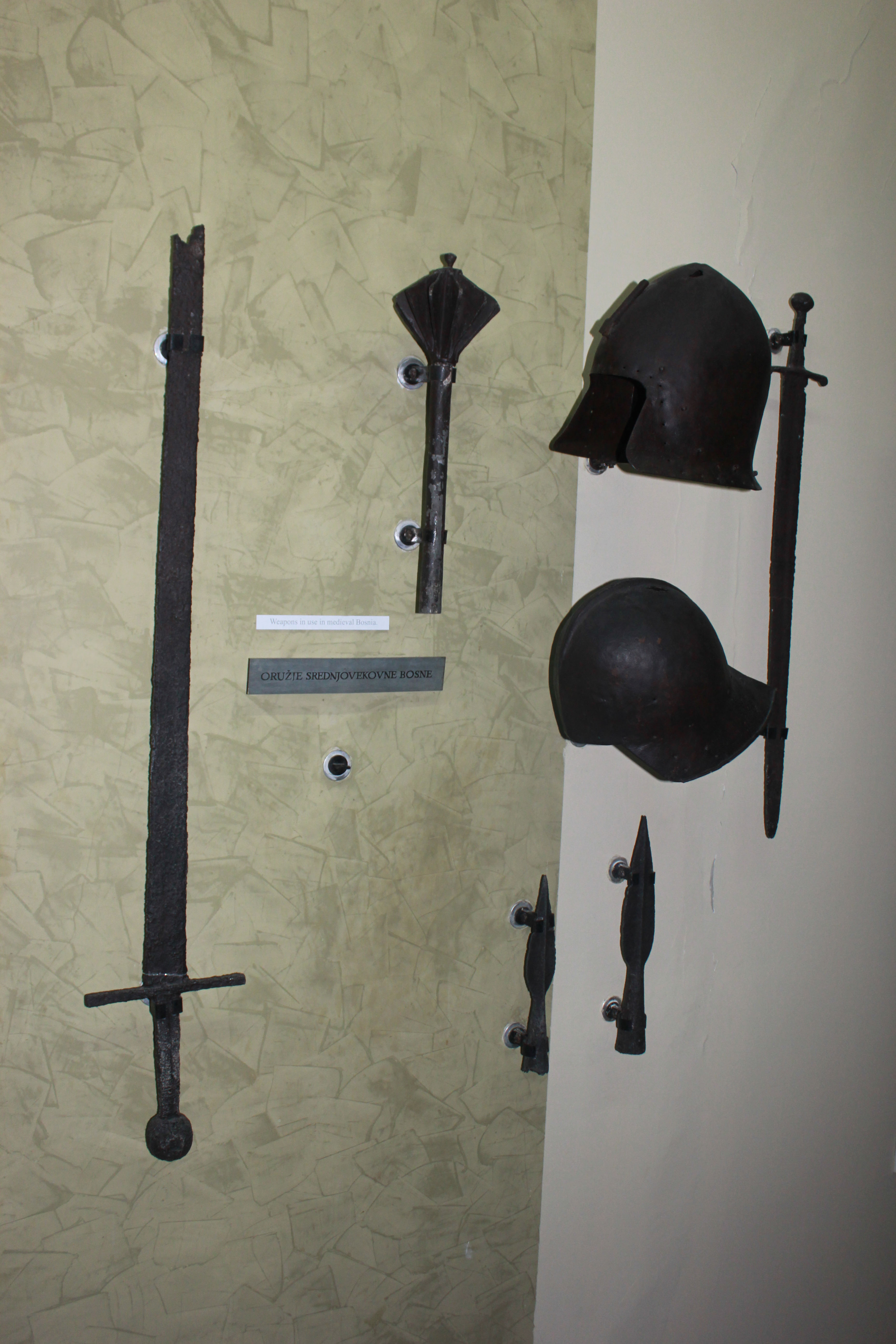
Weapons of Medieval Bosnian kingdom

Thomas succeeded Tvrtko, but his accession was not recognized by the leading magnate of Bosnia, Stjepan Vukčić Kosača. The two engaged in a civil war which ended when Thomas repudiated his wife Vojača and married the insubordinate nobleman's daughter Catherine. Thomas and his second wife, both raised in the Bosnian Church tradition, converted to Roman Catholicism and sponsored the construction of churches and monasteries throughout Bosnia.

Throughout his reign, Thomas waged a war with the Serbian Despotate over the lucrative mining town of Srebrenica and its surroundings, in addition to (or in conjunction with) multiple conflicts with his father-in-law. Having failed to expand into Croatia proper, Thomas turned again to the east in 1458, arranging a match between his son Stephen Tomašević and the Serbian heiress Helena. His control over the remnants of the Serbian Despotate lasted merely a month before the Ottoman conquest of the state. Thomas's failure to defend Serbia permanently damaged his reputation in Europe. Wishing to improve his image among Europe's Catholics, Thomas turned against the Bosnian Church, thus becoming the first ruler of Bosnia to engage in religious persecution.

==== Tvrtko II's death, religious strife and outbreak of civil war ====
The Kingdom of Bosnia and the Despotate of Serbia in 1422

Radivoj styled himself as King of Bosnia for the remainder of Tvrtko's reign. He was nominally supported by the Ottomans and by Stjepan Vukčić Kosača. This alliance could have easily deposed Tvrtko II in Radivoj's favor if they wished, but it appears that their only goal was to weaken and divide Bosnia for their own future benefit.
Notwithstanding, King Tvrtko II maintained himself on the Bosnian throne longer than any of the monarchs who followed Tvrtko I. He also did more to restore royal dignity and centralize the state than any other, leaving a strong mark on Bosnia's politics, economy, and culture. King Tvrtko II died in September 1443. childless, having expressed a wish to be succeeded by his politically inactive and until then rather obscure cousin Stephen Thomas, Radivoj's younger brother and likewise an illegitimate son of Ostoja.

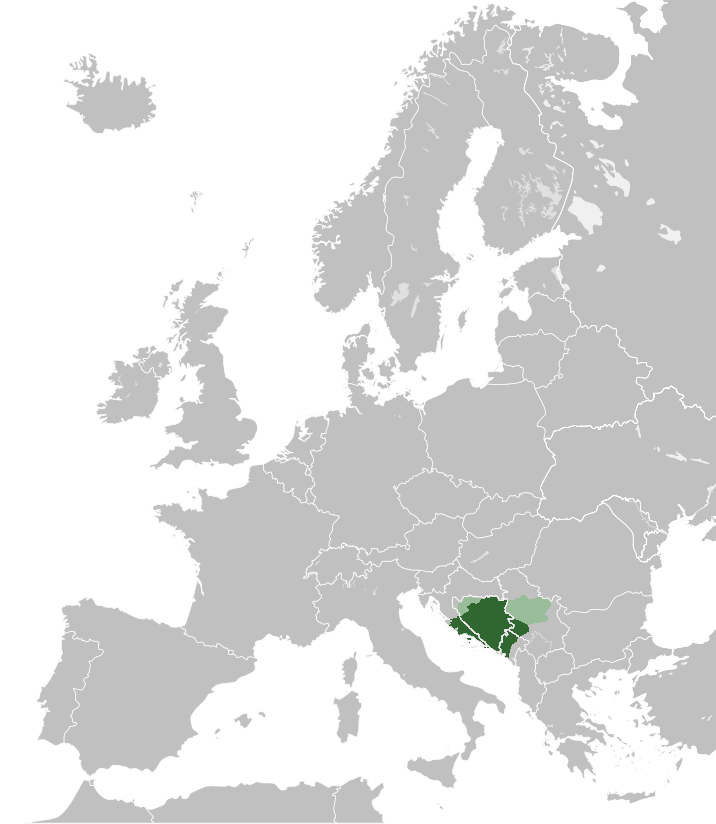
All lands ruled by bosnian kings (Light green temporary: Parts of Donji Kraji and Serbian Despotate under Stjepan Tomašević)

Meanwhile, like most Bosnian nobleman of the era, Stjepan Vukčić too considered himself a staunch Krstjanin, as the Bosnian Church adherents were known and as its members called themselves. His conspicuous attitude toward Bosnian Church was highlighted when king Tvrtko II died and Stjepan refused to recognize a chosen heir, the deceased king's cousin and recent convert to Roman Catholicism, Thomas, as the new King of Bosnia, thus creating a political crisis which culminated in civil war. Apparently, one of the points of contention was Thomas recent conversion Catholicism, move that was deem potentially harmful to the Bosnian Church. And while Thomas' decision to convert was forced political maneuvering, albeit founded in sound reasoning with the saving of the realm on his mind, he also committed himself to demonstrate his devotion by engaging in religious prosecution against his recent fellow co-religionist, thus eventually proving his conversion to be detrimental to the Kristjani. These developments prompted Stjepan to give followers and members of the Bosnian Church safe haven, and also to join the Ottomans in support of Bosnian anti-King Radivoj, Thomas' exiled brother, who was too Bosnian Church faithful and remained so in face of king's crusade against the church adherents.

In 1443, the Papacy sent envoys to Thomas and Stjepan about a counter-offensive against the Ottomans, but the two were in the middle of the civil war. Ivaniš Pavlović, sent by King Thomas, attacked Stjepan Vukčić. Thomas had at the same time been recognized by the Hungarian regent John Hunyadi. Stjepan turned to King Alfonso V of Aragon, who made him "Knight of the Virgin", but did not give him troops. On 15 February 1444, Stjepan signed a treaty with the King of Aragon and Naples, becoming his vassal in exchange for Alfonso's help against his enemies, namely King Thomas, Duke Ivaniš Pavlović and the Republic of Venice. In the same treaty Stjepan promised to pay regular tribute to Alfonso instead of paying the Ottoman sultan as he had done until then.

==== Peace through royal marriage ====
In 1446 Stjepan Vukčić finally recognized Thomas as king, and the pre-war borders were restored. Peace between two rivals was sealed by the marriage of Stjepan's daughter Catherine (Katarina) and King Thomas in May 1446, with Catherine abandoning Bosnian Church and converting to Roman Catholicism.

The Ottomans were displeased with the peace as their interest lay primarily in weakening and dividing Bosnia. Serbian Despot Đurađ Branković was also displeased due to the Srebrenica issue, as the principal mining center of Bosnia returned to Bosnia. In 1448, the Ottomans sent an expedition to plunder King Tomaš's lands, but they also plundered Stjepan Vukčić's lands. Stjepan sent envoys to Despot Đurađ to try to improve the relations between himself on one side and Đurađ and Ottomans on the other.

==== Renewal of conflict ====
In the first half of 1448, Stjepan Vukčić, in an attempt to "bolster his case with the Ottomans", added the title of herzog and styled himself Herzog of Hum and the Coast, Grand Duke of Bosnia, Knyaz of Drina, and the rest, first documented in the spring of 1449. Later, toward the end of 1449 and the beginning of 1450, in a public relations stunt, he changed it to Herzog of Saint Sava, Lord of Hum, Grand Duke of Bosnia, Knyaz of Drina, and the rest.

In 1451 Stjepan Vukčić attacked the Republic of Ragusa, and laid siege to the city. As he had earlier been made a Ragusan nobleman, the Ragusan government now proclaimed him a traitor. A reward of 15,000 ducats, a palace in Dubrovnik worth 2,000 ducats, and an annual income of 300 ducats was offered to anyone who would kill him. along with the promise of hereditary Ragusan noble status which also helped hold this promise to whoever did the deed. The threat seems to have worked, as Stjepan abandoned the siege. After King Thomas and Despot Đurađ reconciled sometime prior to late fall 1451, Ragusa proposed a league against Stjepan. Thomas' charter from 18 December 1451, apart from ceding of some of Stjepan's territories to Ragusa, who nevertheless firmly held those, also included the obligation that he would attack Vukčić.

=== Stjepan Tomašević and Ottoman conquest ===
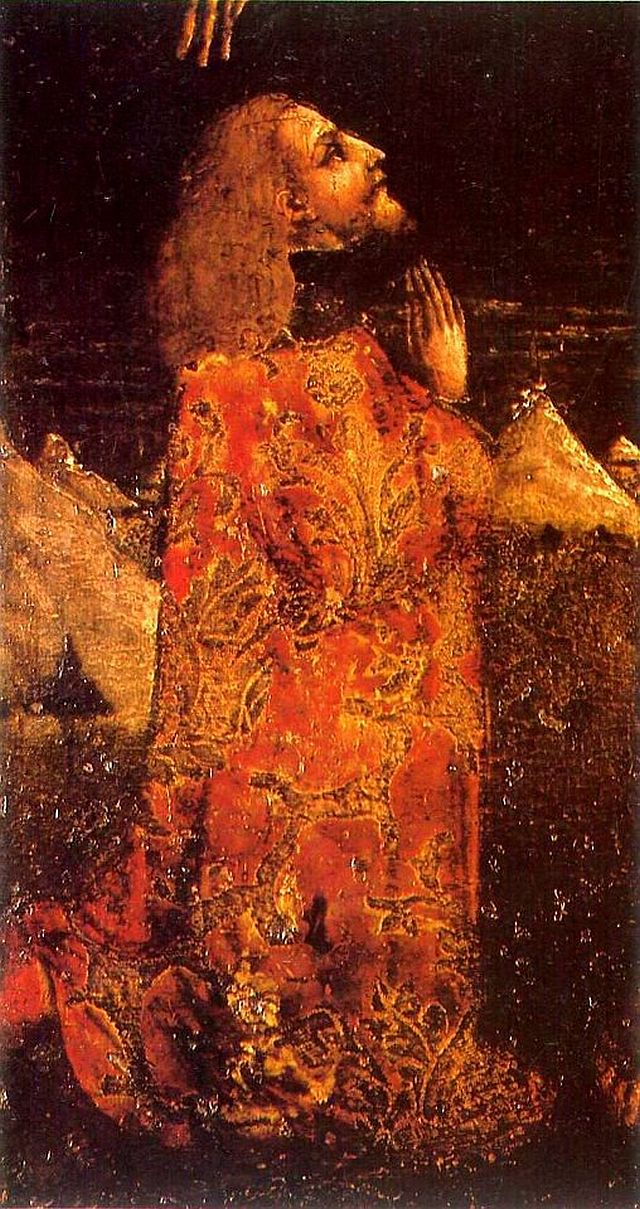
Stjepan Tomašević, the last Bosnian king, by Jacopo Bellini

Stjepan Tomašević succeeded his father on the throne following the latter's death in July 1461 and became the first Bosnian king to receive a crown from the Holy See. Under Tomašević, Bosnia was left to fend for itself by his senior, Matthias Corvinus, who held nominal rule of Bosnia, and by other European powers. After the Ottomans laid siege on Jajce, Tomašević escaped to Ključ, a fortress in the western territories of his realm, but Ottomans led by Mahmud Pasha Angelović pursued and caught up with him there. After a four days siege of Ključ and negotiations, Angelović sent a written assurance to the king, stating that his life will be spared. It turned out to be an empty promise as once the king was lured back to Jajce, he was beheaded just behind the capital's citadel, since then named Carevo polje (transl. "Emperor's Field"). The Kingdom fell in 1463 and eventually became the westernmost province of the Ottoman Empire. After the fall of Bosnia, Catherine, the queen-mother, escaped to Rome on horseback by fooling the Ottomans about which route she wanted to take. She stated that she was leaving the country to see her sons or to visit the Holy See.

The rapid conquest of Bosnia, despite its inaccessible mountain fortresses, was unexpected, but many Bosnians were already aware of the impossible situation. If they were to fall, they preferred the Ottomans to the Hungarians, who they saw as an age-long enemies. They offered their kingdom to Venice in return for aid, but when Venice refused, they preferred to remain under the Ottomans than the Hungarians.

==== Herzegovina emerges ====
After the fall in 1463, herceg Stjepan Vukčić, lord of the Hum province in the south of the kingdom, lived for another three years, enough to see kingdom's complete demise, for which he blamed his eldest son Vladislav Hercegović. On 21 May 1466, old and terminally ill duke dictated his last words, recorded in a testament, and bypassing Vladislav he condemned him by saying that it was him who "brought the great Turk to Bosnia to the death and destruction of us all". The next day duke died.

He was succeeded as herceg by his second and younger son Vlatko Hercegović, who struggled to retain as much of the territory he could. However, Blagaj, Kosača capital, fell in 1466, while Ključ fort between Nevesinje and Gacko was cut off from the main part of his territory, although Vlatko's actions against Ottomans were mostly concentrated around this fort with limited success. Počitelj fell in 1471, however, herceg Vlatko already in 1470 realized that only radical change in his politics could bring him some release, so he pursued and achieved a peace with the Ottomans. In the same year, the Ottomans excluded Hum from the Bosnian Sanjak, and established a new, separate sanjak with its seat in Foča, Sanjak of Herzegovina.
The very last remnants of Bosnian state territory were these stretches of land held by Vlatko in Hum, while he moved residence to his last capital, Novi. He also gave up his agreement with Ottomans, after just a few years or so, just about the same time when his younger brother, Stjepan, assumed highest office of the Ottoman navy as Ahmed Pasha Hercegović (around 1473) in Istanbul. After his marriage in 1474, he reconciled with his older brother Vladislav. Just before death of Sultan Mehmed II, Vlatko tried one more push to the heart of Bosnia, but abandoned by his allies his venture ended in disaster, after which he completely and finitely withdraws to his fortress in Novi. Meanwhile, all this, along with death of Mehmed II, prompted new sultan, Bayezid II, to overtake Novi and its harbor, along with whatever territory remained. In November 1481, Ajaz-Bey of the Sanjak of Herzegovina besieged Novi, however, just before 14 December 1481 Vlatko gave up resisting, and agreed with the Ottomans to move with his family to Istanbul. This signified the ultimate disappearance of what was the last remaining independent point of the Bosnian state.
So, the province endured for another fifteen years after Stjepan Vukčić's death, shrinking with time, before it was eventually swallowed by the Ottomans in December 1481, and incorporated into the empire as re-organized territory of already formed and renamed province, Sanjak of Herzegovina.

==== Jajce banate ====
The fortified Jajce, the capital of, at that point, all but completely annihilated kingdom, was captured by Hungarians under Matthias on 26 December 1463. Hungarians established a defensive territory between advancing Ottomans and their kingdom further north by constituting the "Banate of Jajce" along with the Banate of Srebrenik and the Banate of Bihać. In Hungarian hands Jajce withstood Ottoman attacks until 1527, when it finally surrendered after a decisive Ottoman victory in the Battle of Mohács. Much of modern northern and western Bosnia and Herzegovina was then incorporated into the Ottoman Sanjak of Bosnia, initially belonging to the Rumelia Eyalet, when in 1580 Bosnian Sanjak became a core province of the newly established Eyalet of Bosnia.

== Culture and religion ==
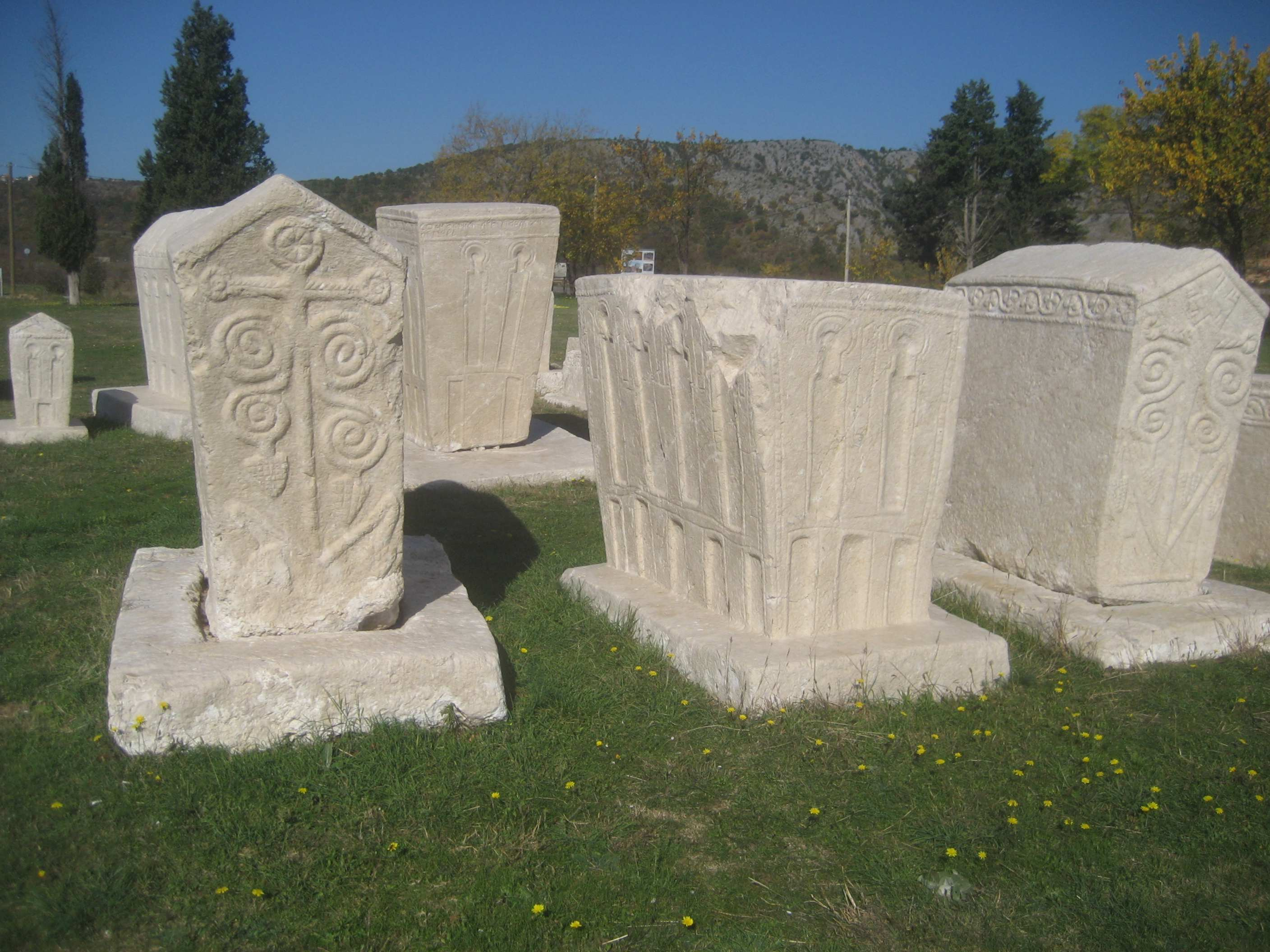
Stećak monuments in Radimlja near Stolac

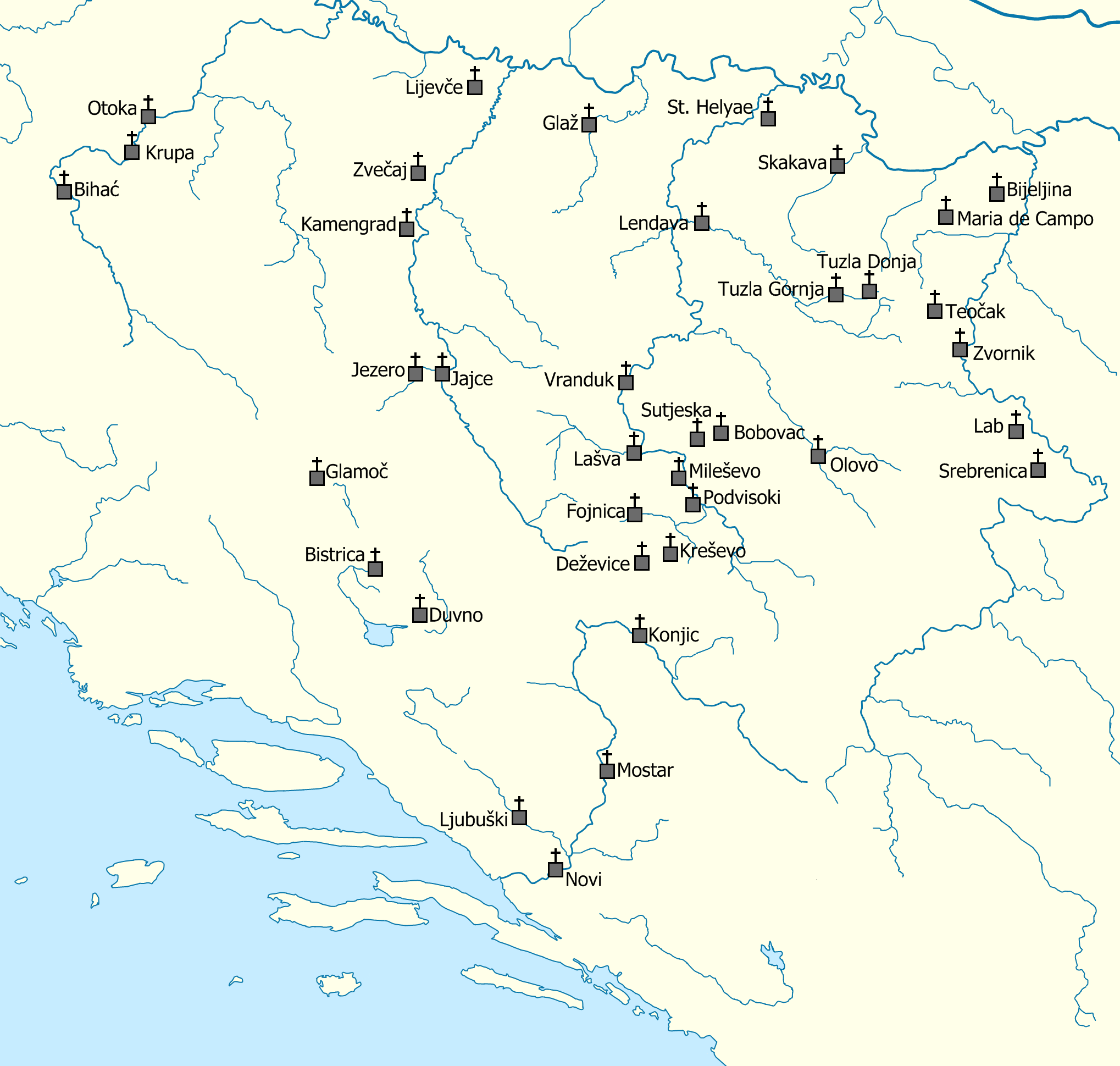
Roman Catholic monasteries in Bosnia in the 15th century

The territory of Bosnia and today's Herzegovina is littered with medieval gravestones called stećak, which first appeared in the middle of the 12th century. They were a tradition among Bosnian, Catholic and Orthodox Church followers alike. While Bosnia had many architecturally impressive stone fortresses, its medieval churches were small, especially compared to Catholic churches along the coast and Orthodox monasteries in neighboring Serbia, possibly because of the indifference of Bosnian nobles towards formal religion.

Medieval Bosnia and Herzegovina had three Christian faiths: Catholic and Orthodox Christians, and some who simply called themselves Bosnians, belonging to the so-called Bosnian Church. Most information about this church comes from outside sources and its exact nature is a subject of debate, particularly around its possible dualist teachings. It was accused by the Catholic and Orthodox authorities of heresy and being linked to the Bogomils (Patarenes). The Catholic church was slightly more dominant in towns and in the west and north of Bosnia. The Bosnian Church was present in Donji Kraji and the Drina river valley to some extent, but the majority of population remained Catholic, although most of the population was without priests. When Vukosav Hrvatinić of Donji Kraji pledged allegiance to Stephen II and gained župa Banica and Vrbanja as a result, Bosnian Church officials were present as a guarantee of charter that confirmed those župas.

The bans and kings of Bosnia were proclaimed Catholics during their reign, except for Ostoja, who showed some interest in the Bosnian Church while he was on the throne, and Radivoj the exiled anti-King, who was openly Bosnian Church faithful and remained so in face of king's crusade against the church adherents. There were, however, several important noblemen who were members of the Bosnian Church, called "Krstjani", such as Hrvoje Vukčić, the Radinović-Pavlović family, Sandalj Hranić, Stjepan Vukčić, and Paul Klešić. Conversions were sometimes used as a political tool by high-ranking nobles such as Hrvoje Vukčić of Donji Kraji, who converted to Catholicism to obtain lucrative titles, but when faced with difficult odds in 1413 he openly threatened that he would go back to "pagan religion", as the Catholic Church viewed the Bosnian Church as a dualist religion. Despite the religious hesitancy of the duke, by his death, the Bosnian Church had lost its foothold in Donji Kraji, since his heirs were increasingly referred to as committed Catholics. At the beginning of the 15th century, the withdrawal of representatives of the Bosnian Church from political activities in the service of Hrvoje Vukčić allowed members of the Catholic Church to take up those seats, as recorded in a document of Juraj Vojsalić dated 12 August 1434.

It was common for the Holy See to have Bosnian rulers renounce any relation to the Bosnian Church, or even perform conversions, in return for support. After Stephen Thomas started persecuting Bosnian Church followers, they responded in the traditional stronghold in Visoko and in 1450 demolished the Franciscan monastery in Mile. However, it was quickly rebuilt. Thomas earned the nickname "damned king" for his actions against adherents of the Bosnian Church. Especially detrimental to the Kristjani were these developments, which in turn prompted Stjepan Vukčić Kosača to give followers and members of the Bosnian Church safe haven, and also to join the Ottomans in support of Bosnian anti-King Radivoj.

== Economy ==
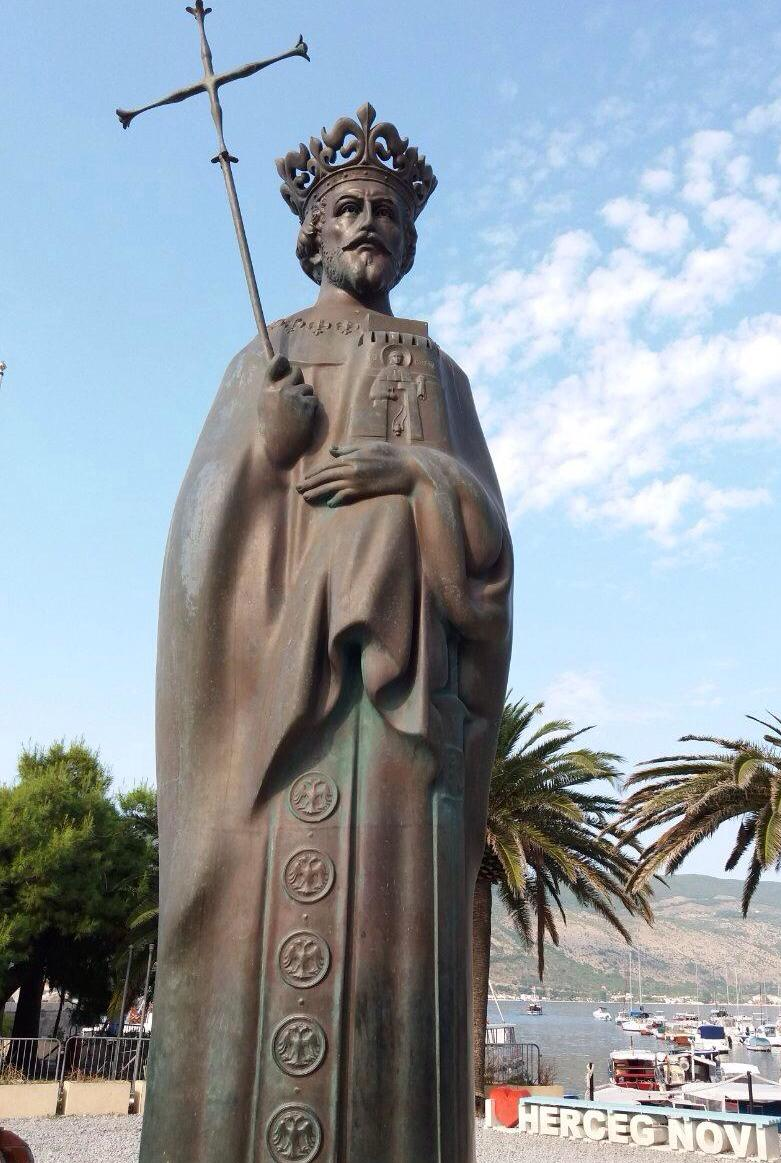
King Tvrtko I, statue in Herceg Novi

Important mining towns like Fojnica, Kreševo, Olovo, Srebrenica, Dusina, Kamenica, and Deževice began to be mentioned in contemporary sources during Tvrtko I's reign. Srebrenica was a very lucrative possession with its silver mines. Caravan trade was frequent between the Republic of Ragusa and Bosnia, and Ragusan merchants had trading colonies in Podvisoki, Fojnica, Srebrenica, Kreševo and others. Economic activity allowed for the creation of new župas like Nenavište in Posavina and Trebotić in Podrinje. Via Narenta and Via Drine were economically crucial as they provided access to Drijeva and Dubrovnik, which in turn provided access to the Adriatic Sea. In 1382 Tvrtko built a new fortress in the Bay of Kotor on the Adriatic coast to form the basis of a new salt trading centre. Initially named after Saint Stephen, the city came to be known as Novi (meaning "new").

Mining was a major industry in Bosnia. Saxons provided engineering expertise, and the mines were often run by Ragusans. Notable among these Saxon engineers was Hans Sasinović, who together with his brother got the rights for silver mines in Ostružnica and Fojnica. Most of the silver mines laid in the king's lands, except from Srebrenica, and there was a demand for Bosnian silver products in the cities on the Adriatic. Germans working in Bosnia produced firearms and cannons, making it one of the first inland Balkan countries to do so.

Vlachs in medieval Bosnia carried much of the traffic between inland and coastal cities. With their caravans, led by kramar, mostly composed of 10 to 100 horses, they conducted much of the trade between inland and coastal cities. A particularly large caravan trade happened on 9 August 1428 between Podvisoki and Ragusa, when Vlachs committed to Ragusan lord Tomo Bunić that they would deliver 1500 modius of salt on 600 horses. At the end of the 14th century, merchants from Podvisoki took part in the slave trade. For example, on November 1389 Bogovac Vukojević sold the small boy Milko for 4 ducats.

In the twilight years of the Kingdom of Bosnia, Thomas engaged in vigorous commerce and made business deals with Dalmatian traders. He relied heavily on his silver mining, but profited most from his salt trade monopolies. Sultan Mehmed started exerting even greater pressure on Bosnia. In addition to financial extortion, Bosnia under Thomas was now forbidden to export silver, which Mehmed claimed for himself, crippling the Bosnian economy. Thomas's successor Stephen Tomašević tried to improve the situation, and the economy became stronger than ever during his reign, collecting more profit from the flourishing metalworking trade.

The most important customs posts were in Drijeva, Vrabač, Deževice, Podvisoki, Trebinje, Foča, Goražde, Borač, Višegrad, Olovo, and Srebrenica. Customs collection was overseen by protovestiarios, who were often Ragusan citizens.

== Historic visual identification ==
One of the early representations of coats of arms attributed to Bosnia come from the Ohmučević Armorial and later Fojnica Armorial, which were completed first in 16th and second in 17th century. In the Illyrian armorials arms are shown upon a gold shield, two black ragged staffs are crossed in saltire with two Moor's heads surmounting the upper portion of each staff. Overall is a red escutcheon that was charged with an eight-pointed star and crescent. In the past centuries, European sources have attributed arms to Bosnia that were close or full analogue to this depiction.

The coat of arms of the Kings of Bosnia, who ruled from 1377 until 1463 over the area that is present day Bosnia-Herzegovina and Dalmatia, consisted of a blue shield with six Golden Lilies displayed around a white bend, all within a gold bordure; the Golden Lily is the Lilium bosniacum, which is a native lily to the area. The crest is a plume of peacock feathers that sit within a coronet of lilies. The House of Kotromanić reigned until 1463 when the Ottomans conquered the region, ceasing then the use of the royal coat of arms in Bosnia.

== List of rulers ==
- Tvrtko I (1377–1391)
- Stephen Dabiša (1391–1395)
- Helen (1395–1398)
- Stephen Ostoja (1398–1404; 1409–1418)
- Tvrtko II (1404–1409; 1420–1443)
- Stephen Ostojić (1418–1420)
  - Radivoj (1432–1435; 1443–1446)
- Stephen Thomas (1443–1461)
- Stephen Tomašević (1461–1463)

=== Queens ===
- Dorothea of Bulgaria (1377–?), wife of Tvrtko I.
- Helen (1391–1395), wife of Stephen Dabiša.
- Vitača, first wife of Stephen Ostoja.
- Kujava Radinović (1399–1415), second wife of Stephen Ostoja.
- Jelena Nelipčić (1416–1418), third wife of Stephen Ostoja, former wife of Hrvoje Vukčić Hrvatinić.
- Dorothy Garai, wife of Tvrtko II.
- Vojača (1443–1445), wife of Stephen Thomas.
- Catherine (1446–1461), wife of Stephen Thomas.
- Maria of Serbia (1461–1463), wife of Stephen Tomašević.

== Sources ==
- Božić, Ivan (1952). Dubrovnik i Turska u XIV i XV veku (in Serbo-Croatian). Vol. 200 (Posebna izdanja ed.). Belgrade: Naučna knjiga. Via Scribd
- Ćirković, Sima (1964). Историја средњовековне босанске државе [History of the medieval Bosnian state] (in Serbian). Srpska književna zadruga (Serbian Literary Guild).
- Ćirković, Sima (1964a). Herceg Stefan Vukčić-Kosača i njegovo doba [Herceg Stefan Vukčić-Kosača and his time] (in Serbian). Naučno delo SANU.
- Ćošković, Pejo (2009). Kotromanići (in Serbo-Croatian). Miroslav Krleža Institute of Lexicography.
- Ćošković, Pejo (2005). Crkva Bosanska U XV Stoljeću. Sarajevo: Institut za itoriju. ISBN 9789958964268.
- Fine, John V. A. Jr. (1994). The Late Medieval Balkans: A Critical Survey from the Late Twelfth Century to the Ottoman Conquest. Michigan: University of Michigan Press. ISBN 978-0-472-08260-5.
- Klaić, Nada (1994) [1994]. Srednjovjekovna Bosna. Zagreb: Eminex.
- Ljubez, Bruno (2009). Jajce Grad: prilog povijesti posljednje bosanske prijestolnice (in Serbo-Croatian). HKD Napredak.
- Vego, Marko (1957). Naselja bosanske srednjovjekovne države (in Serbo-Croatian). Sarajevo: Svjetlost. pp. 127–129.
- Vego, Marko (1982). Postanak srednjovjekovne bosanske države. Sarajevo: Svjetlost.
- Velikonja, Mitja (2003). Religious Separation and Political Intolerance in Bosnia-Herzegovina. Texas A&M University Press. ISBN 1-58544-226-7.
- Živković, Pavo (1981). Tvrtko II Tvrtković: Bosna u prvoj polovini xv stoljeća (in Serbo-Croatian). Sarajevo: Institut za istoriju. ISBN 0-472-08260-4.
