= Šumet =

- Village
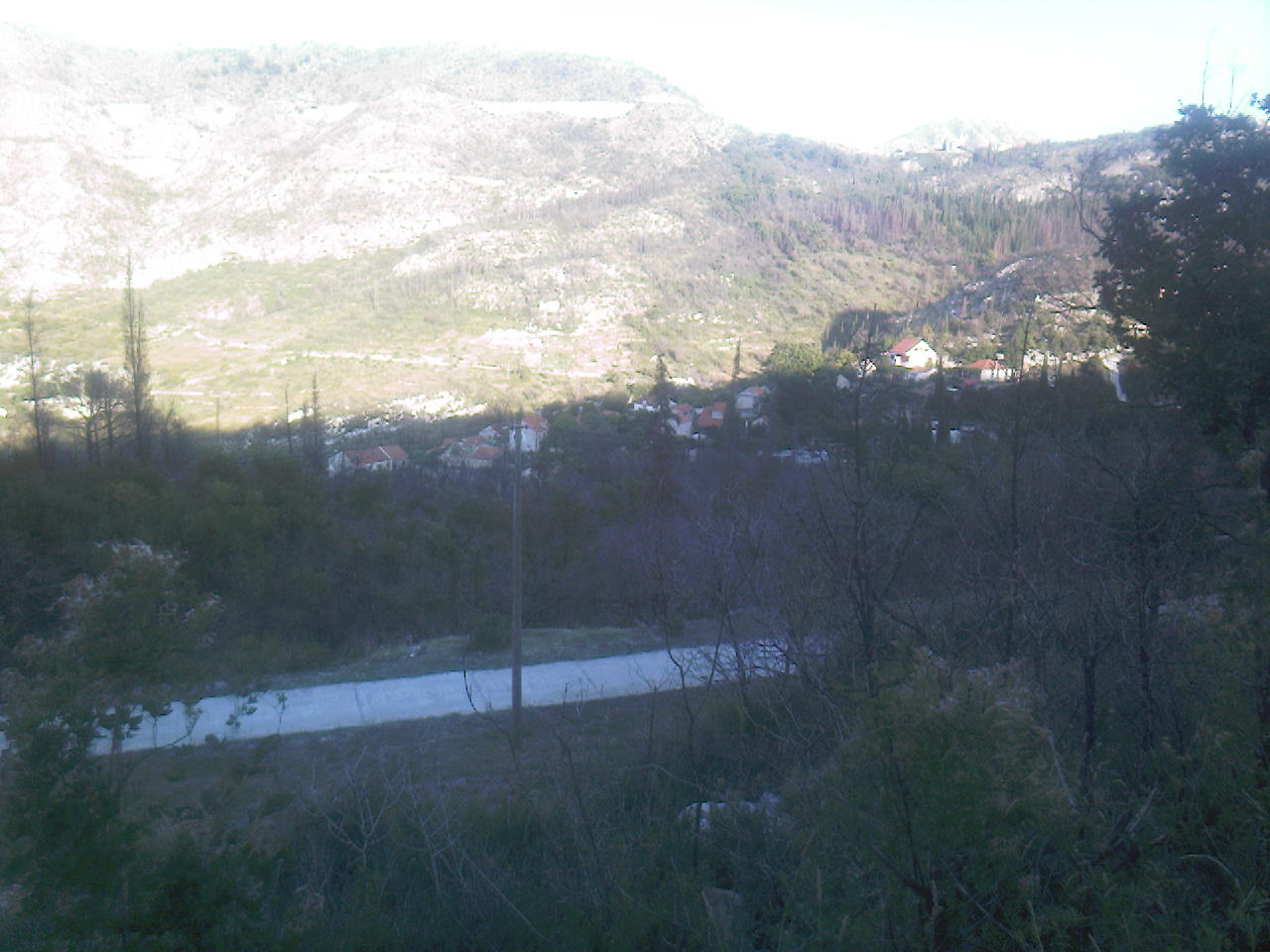

- Location within Croatia
- Coordinates: 42.6505775°N 18.1358443°E
- Country: Croatia
- County: Dubrovnik-Neretva County
- Municipality: Dubrovnik

Area
  - Total: 0.77 sq mi (2.0 km^{2})

Population (2021)
  - Total: 168
  - Density: 220/sq mi (84/km^{2})
- Time zone: UTC+1 (CET)
  - Summer (DST): UTC+2 (CEST)

Šumet is a village in Croatia.

== Demographics ==
According to the 2021 census, its population was 168.
