= Lands of the Hungarian Crown =

Legal concept of the royal titles in Hungary

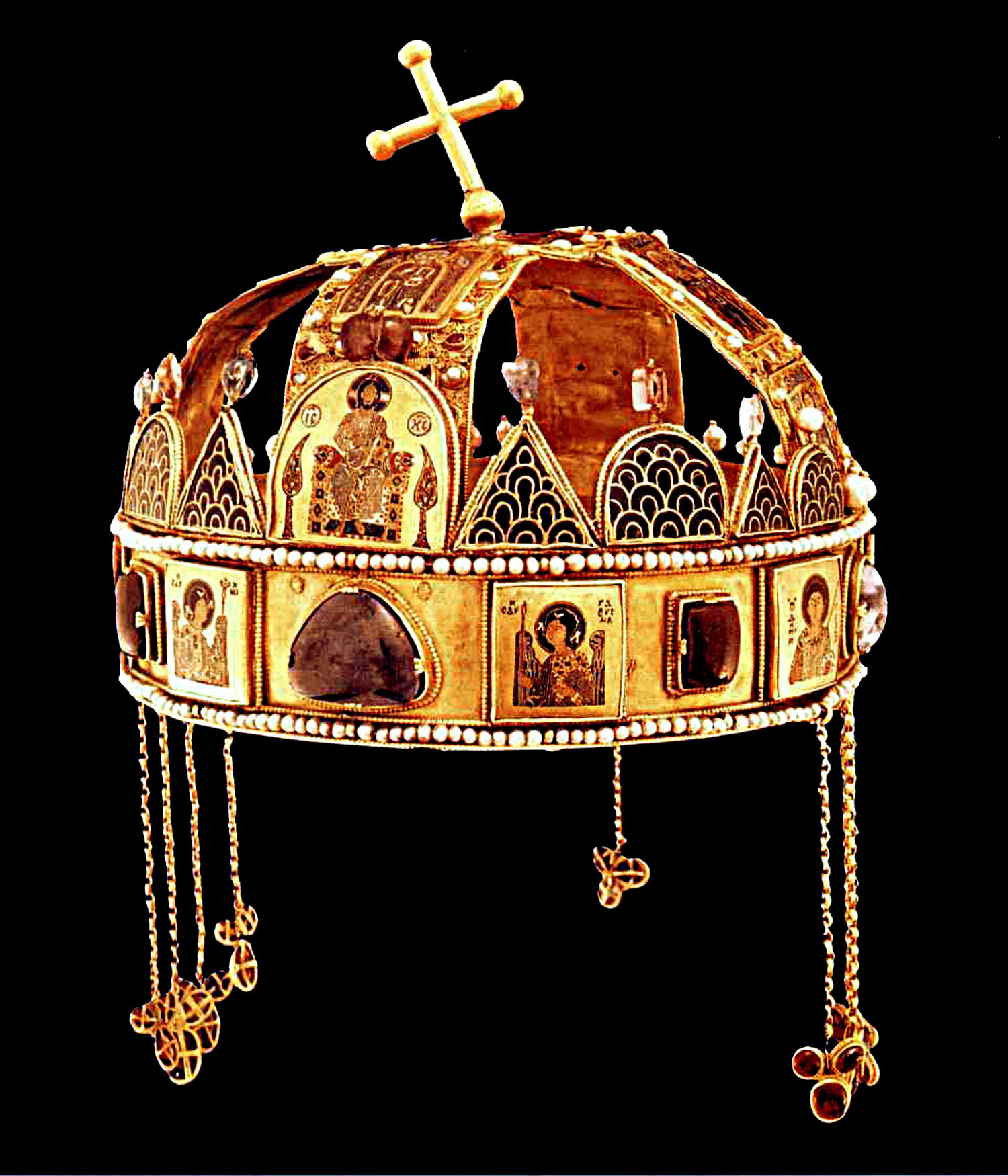
The Holy Crown of Hungary, kept since 2000 at the Hungarian Parliament Building in Budapest

The Lands of the Hungarian Crown (Hungarian: A Magyar Szent Korona Országai) were realms ruled or claimed by Kings of Hungary during medieval and later times. Some of those lands were ruled in reality, whether extensively or temporarily, while others were claimed on various grounds. Those realities and pretensions were symbolically expressed in royal titles, that included the Kingdom of Hungary and various other realms ruled or claimed by Hungarian kings. Such royal titles were the main form of expression of Hungarian pretensions to various territories that the king of Hungary ruled effectively or nominally.

Following the Austro-Hungarian Compromise of 1867, the Hungarian-ruled lands of the Austria-Hungary were officially referred to as Lands of the Crown of Saint Stephen. That specific geopolitical designation was encompassing territories under effective Hungarian rule, and it maintained such scope up to the Dissolution of Austria-Hungary and the abolition of the Kingdom of Hungary on 16 November 1918.

== Middle Ages ==
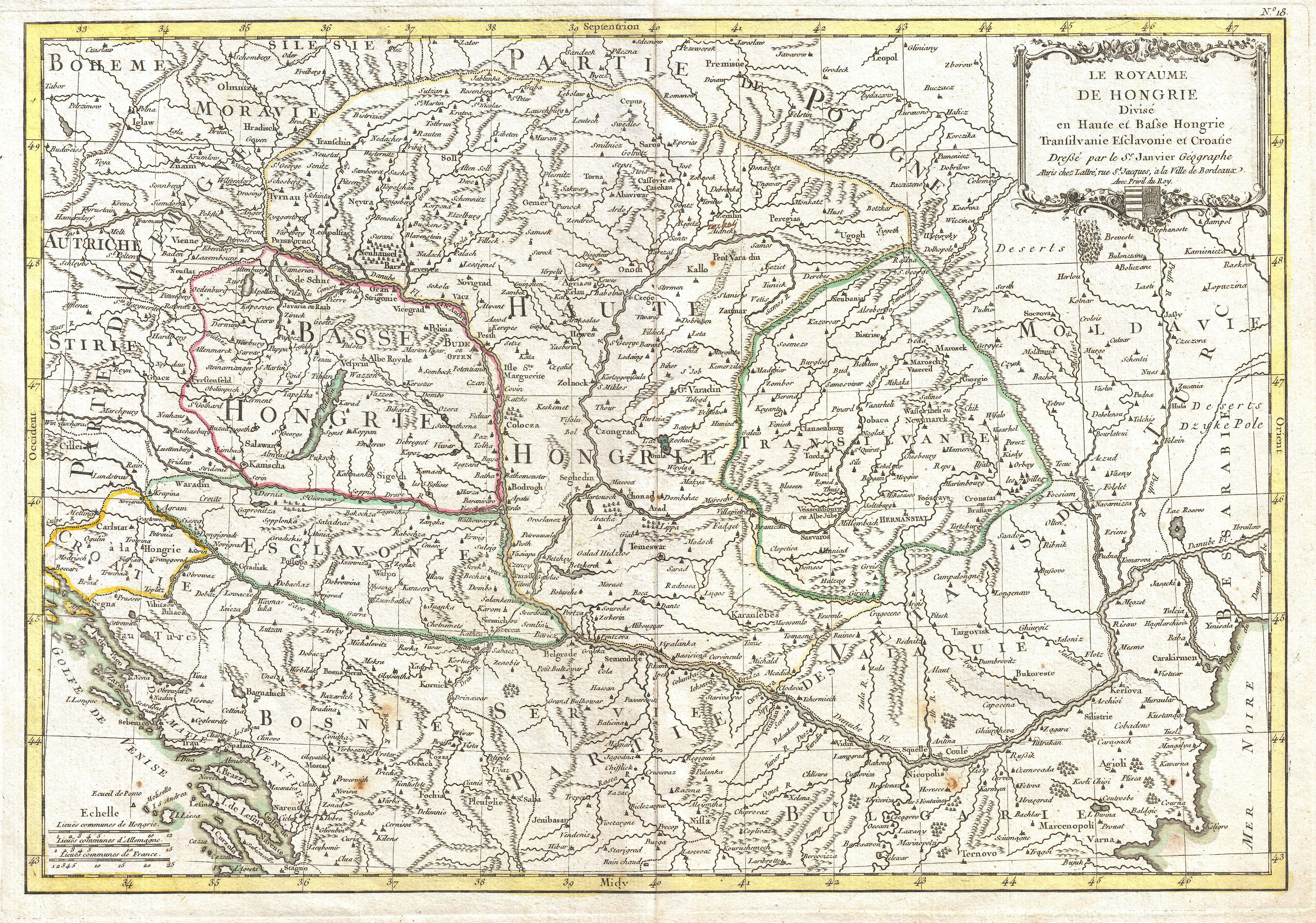
Le Sieur Janvier's map of Hungary (1771)

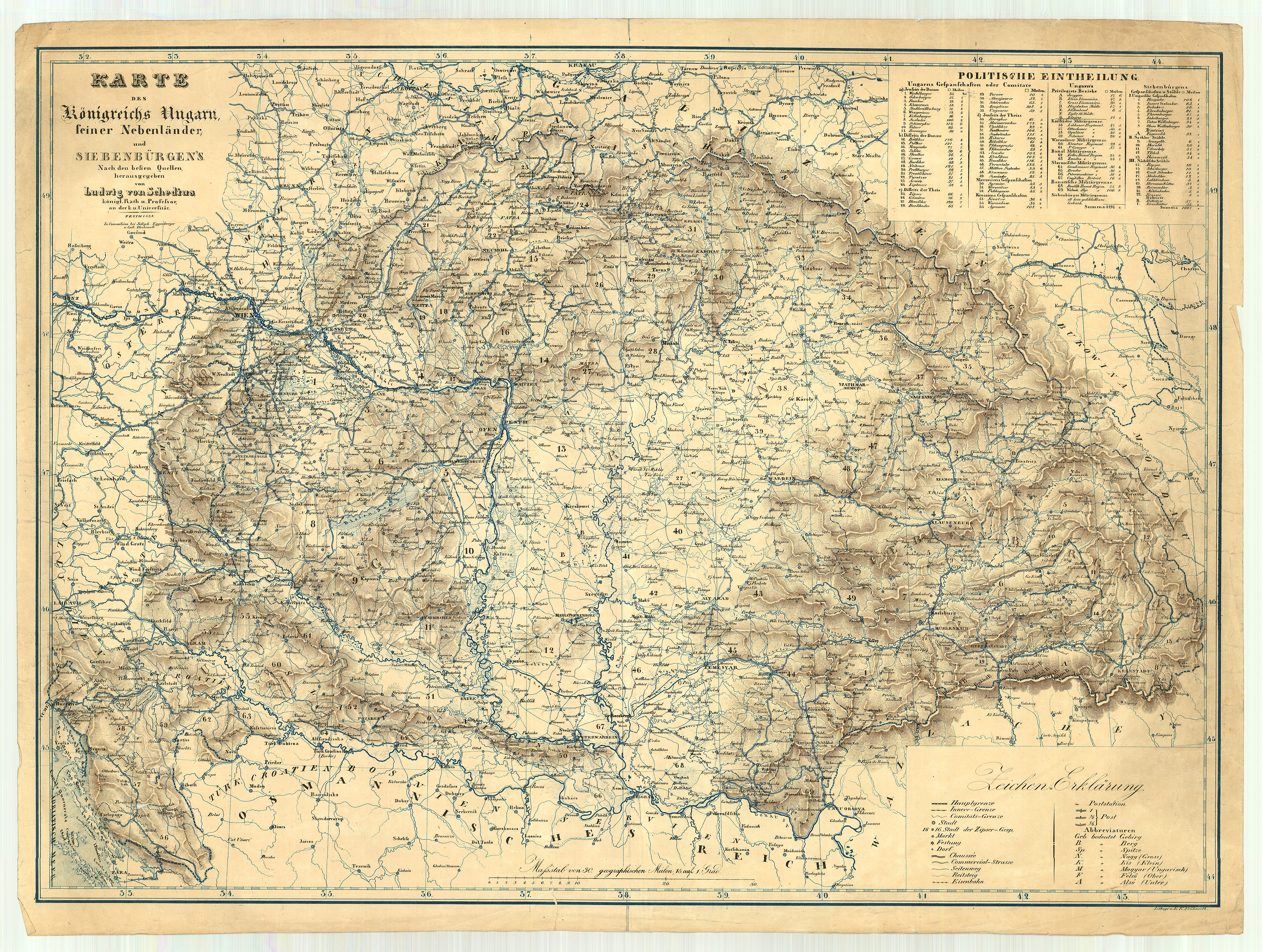
Map of Johann Ludwig von Schedius from 1838

The Holy Crown of Hungary with the coats of arms of its land (c. 1650): Kingdom of Hungary, Dalmatia, Croatia, Cumania, Lodomeria, Bulgaria, Bosnia, Galicia, Serbia, Slavonia. The coats of arms do not mean that all these territories were continuously part of the Kingdom of Hungary. Some were under Hungarian sovereignty or personal union, while others represented historical titles held by Hungarian kings.

St. King Ladislaus I due to a dynastic crisis in Croatia, with the help of the local nobility who supported his claim managed to swiftly seize power in northern parts of the Croatian kingdom (Slavonia). He was a claimant to the throne due to the fact that his sister was married to the late Croatian king Zvonimir who died without an heir (son Radovan predeceased Zvonimir), however, kingship over all of Croatia would not be achieved until the reign of his successor Coloman. In 1102, during the reign of King Coloman of Hungary, the Kingdom of Croatia entered a dynastic union with the Kingdom of Hungary. Therefore successive Hungarian kings bore the additional title of "King of Croatia and Dalmatia". Institutions of separate Croatian statehood were maintained through the Sabor (an assembly of Croatian nobles) and the Ban (viceroy). The nature of the relationship varied through time, Croatia retained a large degree of internal autonomy overall, while the real power rested in the hands of the local nobility.

In 1136, King Béla II invaded Bosnia for the first time and initiated the long enduring effort in attempt to subjugate Bosnia to the Hungarian Crown. Although it was a part of the Hungarian Crown Lands, the Banate of Bosnia was a de facto independent state for much of its history.

In 1137, King Béla II assumed the title of "King of Rama" ("Rex Ramae") to signify his rule of Bosnia, "Rama" being the name of a river in Bosnia, and his successors were also so styled. King Béla II also instituted the inferior title of "Duke of Bosnia" as an honorary title for his adult son, later King Ladislaus II.

After Stefan Nemanja and his son Vukan Nemanjić swore fealty to King Emeric, he assumed the title of King of Serbia ("Rex Serviae") in 1202.

The Principality of Halych was annexed to the Lands of the Hungarian Crown during the reign of King Andrew II, who adopted the title of "King of Galicia". Successive kings usually bore the alternative title of "King of Lodomeria and Galicia", "Lodomeria" denominating the city of Volodymyr (contemporarily in Ukraine).

Béla IV of Hungary began expansionist politics towards Cumania. He promoted Christian missions among the pagan Cumans who dwelled in the plains south of the Carpathians. In 1228, he established the Diocese of Cumania which was initially under the jurisdiction of the Archbishopric of Esztergom. Local chieftains acknowledged his suzerainty and he adopted the title of King of Cumania ("Rex Cumaniae") in 1233.

King Stephen V conquered territory in Bulgaria, received its local nobles as his vassals, and thereafter bore the title of "King of Bulgaria".

== The birth of the three regna ==
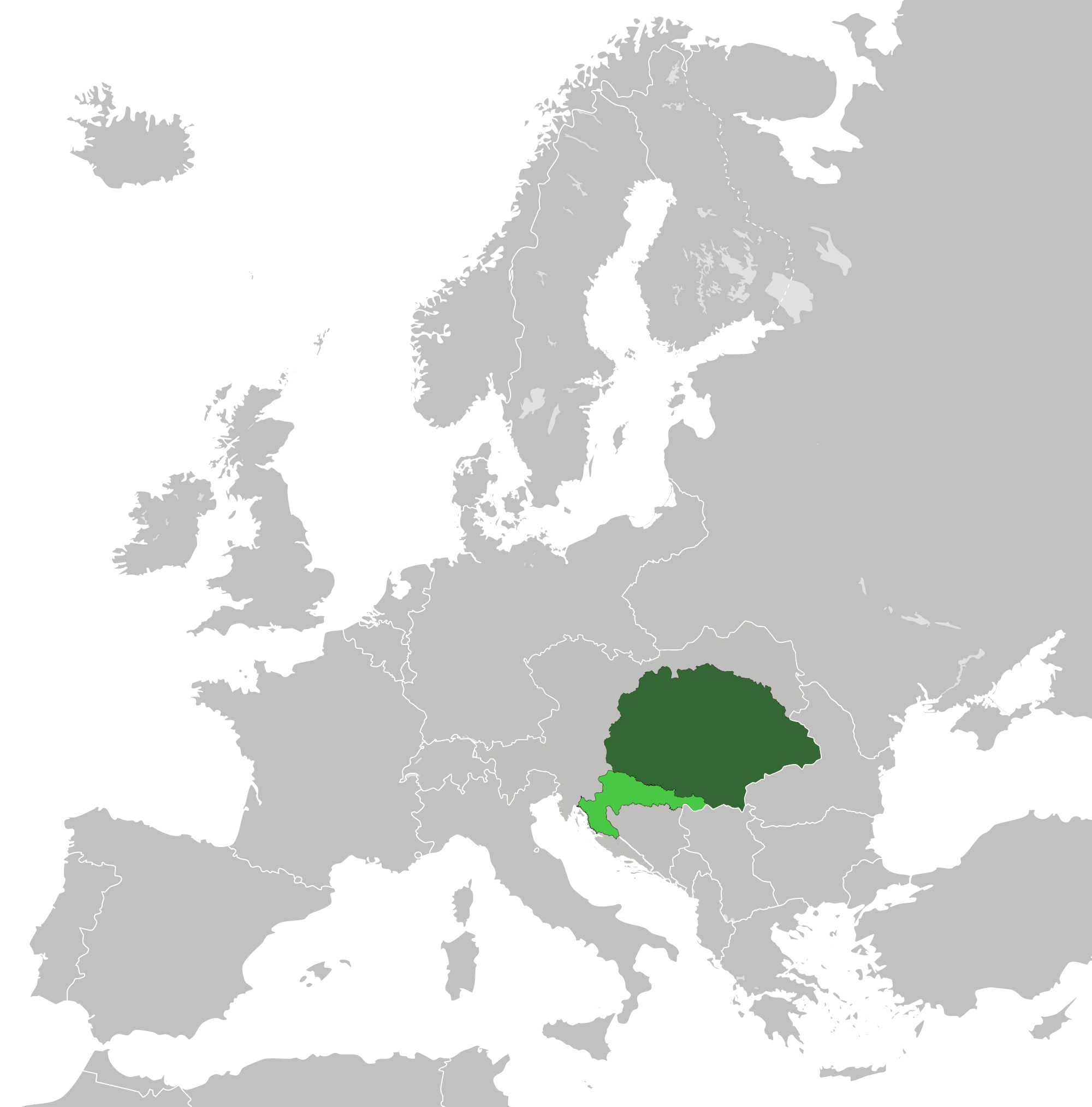
Kingdom of Hungary before World War One

Between 1526 and 1541, Hungary disintegrated into Habsburg-, Ottoman- and Transylvanian-ruled parts. From the 16th century on, Royal Hungary, Croatia and Transylvania were considered the three regna of the Crown, separate from Ottoman Hungary. These lands had some links with each other but became more and more autonomous during the centuries.

In the 18th century, the Lands of the Hungarian Crown consisted of the Kingdom of Hungary, the Kingdom of Croatia and the Kingdom of Slavonia with the city of Fiume, the Grand Principality of Transylvania, the Croatian Military Frontier, the Slavonian Military Frontier, and the Serbian-Hungarian military frontiers.

Galicia was acquired by the Habsburgs in the name of the Hungarian Crown; however, it was not attached to Hungary.

During the Hungarian Revolution of 1848, the Hungarian government proclaimed in the April Laws of 1848 that Transylvania became fully integrated into Hungary. However, after the fall of the revolution, the March Constitution of Austria defined the Principality of Transylvania as being a separate crown land that was entirely independent of Hungary.

In 1867, the Crown's two regna, Transylvania and Hungary, were reunited in the Austro-Hungarian Compromise of 1867. However, the Kingdom of Croatia-Slavonia kept and improved its position as an autonomous realm within the Lands of the Crown of Saint Stephen. In 1881, Croatian and Slavonian military frontiers were abolished and united with Croatia-Slavonia.

After World War I, Transylvania was ceded to Romania and Croatia (with Slavonia) formed the State of Slovenes, Croats and Serbs (on 1 December 1918 it united with the Kingdom of Serbia to form the Kingdom of Serbs, Croats and Slovenes). The city of Fiume became short lived Free State of Fiume until 1924 when it was ceded to Italy. Territories of south-Hungarian counties in Banat, Bácska and Baranya (the west of Temes County, Torontál County, Bács-Bodrog County and Baranya County) as a Province of Banat, Bačka and Baranja became part of the Kingdom of Serbs, Croats and Slovenes.

== Literature ==
- Fine, John Van Antwerp Jr. (1991) [1983]. The Early Medieval Balkans: A Critical Survey from the Sixth to the Late Twelfth Century. Ann Arbor, Michigan: University of Michigan Press. ISBN 0472081497.
- Fine, John Van Antwerp Jr. (1994) [1987]. The Late Medieval Balkans: A Critical Survey from the Late Twelfth Century to the Ottoman Conquest. Ann Arbor, Michigan: University of Michigan Press. ISBN 0472082604.
- Klaić, Nada (1994) [1994]. Srednjovjekovna Bosna. Zagreb: Eminex. ISBN 953-6112-05-1.
