= Ban (title) =

Noble title used in Central and Southeastern Europe

Ban (/ˈbɑːn/, BAHN) was the title of local rulers or officeholders, similar to viceroy, used in several states in Central and Southeastern Europe between the 7th and 20th centuries. The most common examples have been found in medieval Croatia and medieval regions ruled and influenced by the Kingdom of Hungary. They often ruled as the king's governmental representatives, supreme military commanders and judges, and in 18th century Croatia, even as chief government officials. In the Banate of Bosnia they were always de facto supreme rulers.

== Historical sources ==
The first known mention of the title ban is in the 10th century by Constantine VII Porphyrogenitus, in the work De Administrando Imperio, in the 30th and 31st chapter "Story of the province of Dalmatia" and "Of the Croats and of the country they now dwell in", dedicated to the Croats and the Croatian organisation of their medieval state. In the 30th chapter, describing in Byzantine Greek, how the Croatian state was divided into eleven ζουπανίας (zoupanías; župas), the ban βοάνος (Boános), καὶ ὁ βοάνος αὐτῶν κρατεῖ (rules over) τὴν Κρίβασαν (Krbava), τὴν Λίτζαν (Lika) καὶ (and) τὴν Γουτζησκά (Gacka). In the 31st chapter, describing the military and naval force of Croatia, "Miroslav, who ruled for four years, was killed by the βοεάνου (boéánou) Πριβουνία (Pribounía, i.e. Pribina)", and after that followed a temporary decrease in the military force of the Croatian Kingdom.

In 1029, a Latin charter was published by Jelena, sister of ban Godemir, in Obrovac, for donation to the monastery of St. Krševan in Zadar. In it she is introduced as "Ego Heleniza, soror Godemiri bani...". Franjo Rački noted that if it is not an original, then it is certainly a transcript from the same 11th century.

In the 12th century, the title was mentioned by an anonymous monk of Dioclea and in the Supetar Cartulary. The Byzantine Greek historian John Kinnamos wrote the title in the Greek form μπάνος (mpanos). In the Chronicle of the Priest of Duklja, which is dated to 12th and 13th century, in the Latin redaction is written as banus, banum, bano, and in the Croatian redaction only as ban. The Supetar Cartulary includes information until the 12th century, but the specific writing about bans is dated to the late 13th and early 14th century, a transcript of an older document. It mentions that there existed seven bans and they were elected by the six of Twelve noble tribes of Croatia, where the title is written as banus and bani.

== Origin ==
=== Etymology ===
The Late Proto-Slavic word *banъ is considered to not be of native Slavic lexical stock and is generally argued to be a borrowing from a Turkic language, but such a derivation is highly criticized by the modern historians who rather argue Western European origin. The title's origin among medieval Croats is not completely understood, and it is hard to determine the exact source and to reconstruct the primal form of the Turkic word it is derived from. According to mainstream theory it is generally explained as a derivation from the personal name of the Pannonian Avars ruler, Bayan, which is a derivation of the Proto-Turkic root *bāj- "rich, richness, wealth; prince; husband". The Proto-Turkic root *bāj- is sometimes explained as a native Turkic word; however, it could also be a borrowing from the Iranian bay (from Proto-Iranian *baga- "god; lord"). The title word ban was also derived from the name Bojan, and there were additionally proposed Iranian, (Note: The Iranian theory besides the already mentioned, according some modern scholars additionally notes; the Persian-English dictionary by E. H. Palmer, where is mentioned that noun suffix bàn or vàn derives from verb (meaning "keeping, managing"), composing bâgh-ban (gardener), der-bân (gate keeper), nigah-bàn (records keeper), raz-bàn (vineyard keeper), galah-bàn (pastor), shahr-bān (town keeper), kad-bánú (lady; shahbanu) as well the verb baná (build), báni; banná (builder).; the title ba(n)daka (henchman, loyal servant, royal vassal), an epithet of high rank in the Behistun Inscription used by Achaemenid king Darius I for his generals and satraps (Vidarna, Vindafarnā, Gaubaruva, Dādṛši, Vivāna, Taxmaspāda, Vaumisa, Artavardiya), and the bandag in the Paikuli inscription used by Sasanian king Narseh. The Old Persian bandaka derives from banda, from Old Indian noun bandha, "bond, fetter", from Indo-European root bhendh, in Middle Iranian and Pahlavi bandag (bndk/g), Sogdian βantak, Turfan bannag.; the name Artabanus of Persian and Parthian rulers; the Elam royal rulers name Hu(m)ban, carried in honour of god Khumban, and the city Bunban; the title ubanus denoted to Prijezda I (1250–1287) by Pope Gregory IX.) and Germanic, (Note: The Germanic theory was emphasized by Vjekoslav Klaić, and Gjuro Szabo who developed the view by philologist Johann Georg Wachter from his Glossarium Germanicum (1737), and the similar viewpoint by Friedrich Kluge in his Etymologisches Wörterbuch der deutschen Sprache (1883). V. Klaić noted the relation between Gothic word bandvjan (bandwjan) and the widespread bannus, bannum, French ban, German bann, Spanish and Italian bando, with all to denote the office power grant or banner (see Ban (medieval) and King's ban). G. Szabo noted the Hesychius commentary banoi ore strongila (rounded hills), and Wachter's consideration that Ban signifies "hill, peak, height", and as such was transferred to the meaning of "high dignity". I. Mužić cites Korčula codex (12th century); Tunc Gothi fecerunt sibi regem Tetolam qui fuerat aliis regibus banus et obsedebat undique Romanis. I. Mužić additionally noted the consideration by Celtologist Ranka Kuić (Crveno i crno Srpsko-keltske paralele, 2000, pg. 51), who considered Ban a Celtic designation for "hill peak", while Banat as "hilly region".) language origin.

The Avar nameword bajan, which some scholars trying to explain the title's origin interpreted with alleged meaning of "ruler of the horde", itself is attested as the 6th century personal name of Avar khagan Bayan I which led the raids on provinces of the Byzantine Empire. Some scholars assume that the personal name was a possible misinterpretation of a title, but Bayan already had a title of khagan, and the name, as well its derivation, are well confirmed. The title ban among the Avars has never been attested to in the historical sources, and as such the Avarian etymological derivation is unconvincing.

=== Research history ===
==== 20th century ====
The title's etymological and functional origins are unknown. It was used as "evidence" throughout the history of historiography to prove ideological assumptions on Avars, and specific theories on the origin of early medieval Croats. The starting point of the debate was year 1837, and the work of historian and philologist Pavel Jozef Šafařík, whose thesis has influenced generations of scholars. In his work Slovanské starožitnosti (1837), and later Slawische alterthümer (1843) and Geschichte der südslawischen Literatur (1864), was the first to connect the ruler title of ban, obviously not of Slavic lexical stock, which ruled over župas of today's region of Lika, with the Pannonian Avars. He concluded how Avars lived in that same territory, basing his thesis on a literal reading of the statement from Constantine VII's 30th chapter, "there are still descendants of the Avars in Croatia, and are recognized as Avars". However, modern historians and archaeologists until now proved the opposite, that Avars never lived in the area of the Roman province of Dalmatia (including Lika), and that statement occurred somewhere in Pannonia. Šafařík assumed that the Avars by the name word bayan called their governor, and in the end concluded that the title ban derives from the "name-title" Bayan, which is also a Persian title word (see Turkish bey for Persian bag/bay), and neglected that it should derive from the Slavic name Bojan. His thesis would be later endorsed by many historians, and both South Slavic titles ban and župan were asserted as Avars official titles, but it had more to do with the scholar's ideology of the time than actual reality.

Franz Miklosich wrote that the word, of Croatian origin, probably was expanded by the Croats among the Bulgarians and Serbs, while if it is Persian, than among Slavs is borrowed from the Turks. Erich Berneker wrote that became by contraction from bojan, which was borrowed from Mongolian-Turkic bajan ("rich, wealthy"), and noted Bajan is a personal name among Mongols, Avars, Bulgars, Altaic Tatars, and Kirghiz. Đuro Daničić decided for an intermediate solution; by origin is Avar or Persian from bajan (duke).

J. B. Bury derived the title from the name of Avar khagan Bayan I, and Bulgarian khagan Kubrat's son Batbayan, with which tried to prove the Bulgarian-Avar (Turkic) theory on the origin of early medieval Croats. Historian Franjo Rački did not discard the possibility South Slavs could obtain it from Avars, but he disbelieved it had happened in Dalmatia, yet somewhere in Pannonia, and noticed the existence of bân ("dux, custos") in Persian language. He also observed that ban could only be someone from one of the twelve Croatian tribes according to Supetar cartulary. This viewpoint is supported by the Chronicle of Duklja; Latin redaction; Unaquaque in provincia banum ordinavit, id est ducem, ex suis consanguineis fratribus ([Svatopluk] in every province allocated a ban, and they were duke's consanguin brothers); Croatian redaction defines that all bans need to be by origin native and noble. Tadija Smičiklas and Vatroslav Jagić thought that the title should not derive from bajan, but from bojan, as thus how it is written in the Greek historical records (boan, boean).

Vjekoslav Klaić pointed out that the title before 12th century is documented only among Croats, and did not consider a problem that Bajan was a personal name and not a title, as seen in the most accepted derivation of Slavic word *korljь (kral/lj, krol). He mentioned both thesis (from Turkic-Persian, and Slavic "bojan, bojarin"), as well the German-Gothic theory derivation from banner and power of ban and King's ban. Gjuro Szabo shared similar Klaić's viewpoint, and emphasized the widespread distribution of a toponym from India to Ireland, and particularly among Slavic lands, and considered it as an impossibility that had derived from a personal name of a poorly known khagan, yet from a prehistoric word Ban or Pan.

Ferdo Šišić considered that is impossible it directly originated from a personal name of an Avar ruler because the title needs a logical continuity. He doubted its existence among Slavic tribes during the great migration, and within early South Slavic principalities. He strongly supported the Šafařík thesis about Avar descendants in Lika, now dismissed by scholars, and concluded that in that territory they had a separate governor whom they called bajan, from which after Avar assimilation, became Croatian title ban. The thesis of alleged Avar governor title Šišić based on his personal derivation of bajan from the title khagan. Nada Klaić advocated the same claims of Avars descendants in Lika, and considered bans and župans as Avar officials and governors.

Francis Dvornik on the other hand, although mentioned Šišić's argumentation, considered to be of common Indo-European root (an Czechs and Poles have pan meaning "master") or Iranian-Sarmatian origin, and "we are fully entitled to suppose that the Croats had a similar organization when they were living northeast of the Carpathian Mountains". Stjepan Krizin Sakač emphasized that the word bajan is never mentioned in historical sources as a title, the title ban is never mentioned in such a form, and there's no evidence that Avars and Turks ever used a title closely related to the title ban. Sakač connected the Croatian bân with statements from two Persian dictionaries (released 1893 and 1903); the noun bàn (lord, master, illustrious man, chief), suffix bân (guard), and the Sasanian title merz-bân (مرزبان marz-bān, Marzban). He considered that the early Croats originated from the Iranian-speaking Sarmatians probably Alans and Aorsi. The view of the possible Iranian origin (from ban; keeper, guard), besides Avarian, was shared by the modern scholars like Vladimir Košćak, Horace Lunt and Tibor Živković.

==== 21st century ====
In the 21st century, historians like Mladen Ančić (2013) and Neven Budak (2018) in their research and synthesis of Croatian history concluded that the Avar linguistic argumentation is unconvincing and the historical sources poorly support such a thesis, emphasizing rather the Frankish origin of the title. Ančić emphasized that Avarian derivation is related to cultural and political ideologization since the 19th century which avoided any association with Germanization and German heritage. According to him, the title and its functions directly derive from a Germanic medieval term ban or bannum, the royal power of raising of armies and the exercise of justice later delegated to the counts, which was widely used in Francia. Archaeologist Vladimir Sokol (2007) independently came to a very similar conclusion relating it to the influence of Franks during their control of Istria and Liburnia.

In 2013, historian Tomislav Bali noted the possible connection of the title with the military and territorial administrative unit bandon of the Byzantine Empire. The unit term derives, like the Greek bandon (from the 6th century) and Latin bandus and bandum (from the 9th century; banner), from the Gothic bandwō, a military term used by the troops who had Germanic or fought against Germanic peoples. Bali considered that the Croatian rulers possibly were influenced by the Byzantine model in the organization of the territory and borrowed the terminology and that such thesis can be related to Sokol's arguing of Western influence.

== Use of the title ==
Sources from the earliest periods are scarce, but existing show that since Middle Ages "ban" was the title used for local land administrators in the areas of Balkans where South Slavic population migrated around the 7th century, namely in Duchy of Croatia (8th century–c. 925), Kingdom of Croatia, Croatia in union with Hungary (1102–1526), and many regions ruled and influenced by Kingdom of Hungary like Banate of Bosnia (1154–1377), Banate of Severin (1228–1526), Banate of Macsó (1254–1496) and else. According to Noel Malcolm, usage of the Croatian title "ban" in Bosnia indicates that political ties with the Croatian world was from the earliest times, while supreme leader of the Serbs has always been called the Grand Prince (Veliki Župan) and never the "ban".

The meaning of the title changed with time: the position of a ban can be compared to that of a viceroy or a high vassal such as a hereditary duke, but neither is accurate for all historical bans. In Croatia a ban reigned in the name of the ruler, he is the first state dignitary after King, the King's legal representative, and had various powers and functions.

In South Slavic languages, the territory ruled by a ban was called Banovina (or Banat), often transcribed in English as Banate or Bannate, and also as Banat or Bannat.

=== Croatia ===
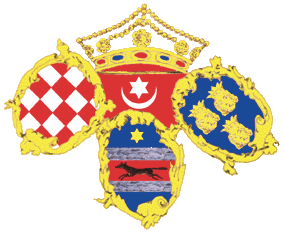
Ban of Croatia's standard

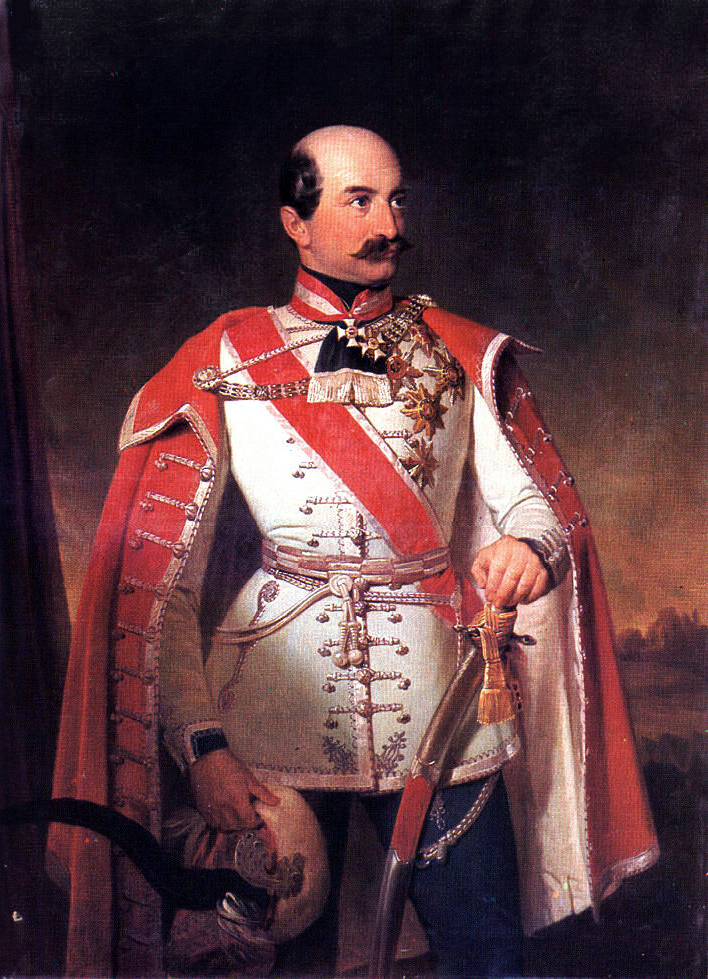
Josip Jelačić, ban of Croatia (1848–1859)

The earliest mentioned Croatian ban was Pribina in the 10th century, followed by Godemir (969–995), Gvarda or Varda (c. 995–1000), Božeteh (c. 1000–1030), Stjepan Praska (c. 1035–1058), Gojčo (c. 1060–1069), and later Dmitar Zvonimir (c. 1070–1075) and possibly Petar Snačić (c. 1075–1091) who would become the last native Croatian king.

The fairly late mid-10th century mention, because is not mentioned in older inscriptions and royal charters, indicates it was not preserved from the period of Avar Khaganate as was previously presumed in historiography. It rather indicates to the influence of the expansion of the Northern border by King Tomislav of Croatia, after the conquest of Slavonia by the Hungarians, making the position of ban similar to that of a margrave defending a frontier region. That the ban was significant almost as a king is seen in a 1042 charter in which a certain ban "S", most probably Stjepan Praska, founded by himself a monastery of Chrysogoni Jaderæ granting it land, taxation, wealth, cattle, peasants, and that he attained the Byzantine imperial title of protospatharios. This imperial title, somehow related to that of a ban, was given to provincial governors and foreign rulers, and most probably was used to highlight the connection between the Croatian and Byzantine royal court.

After 1102, as Croatia entered personal union with Hungarian kingdom, the title of ban was appointed by the kings. Croatia was governed by the viceroys as a whole between 1102 and 1225, when it was split into two separate banovinas: Slavonia and Croatia, and Dalmatia. Two different bans were appointed until 1476, when the institution of a single ban was resumed. The title of ban persisted in Croatia even after 1527 when the country became part of the Habsburg monarchy, and continued all the way until 1918. In the 18th century, Croatian bans eventually become chief government officials in Croatia. They were at the head of Ban's Government as well Court (Tabula Banalis), effectively the first prime ministers of Croatia.

=== Bosnia ===
At the beginning Bosnian status as a de facto independent state fluctuated, depending on era, in terms of its relations with the Kingdom of Hungary and Byzantine Empire. Its rulers were called bans, and their territory banovina. Nevertheless, the Bosnian bans were never viceroys, in the sense as their neighbors in the west in Croatia, appointed by the king.

Earliest mentioned Bosnian bans were Borić (1154–1163) and Kulin (1163–1204). The Bosnian medieval dynasties who used the title Ban from the 12th until the end of 14th century includes Borić, Kulinić with Ban Kulin and Matej Ninoslav being most prominent member, and Kotromanić dynasty.

Some of the most prominent bans from the 12th until the end of 13th centuries includes Ban Borić, Ban Kulin, Ban Stephen Kulinić, Ban Matej Ninoslav, Prijezda I, Prijezda II, Stephen I and Stephen II.

The Bosnian medieval state used the title "ban" until the rulers adopted the use of the title "king" under the Kingdom of Bosnia, with Ban Stephen's II successor Tvrtko I being the first who inaugurate the title "king".

=== Kingdom of Hungary ===
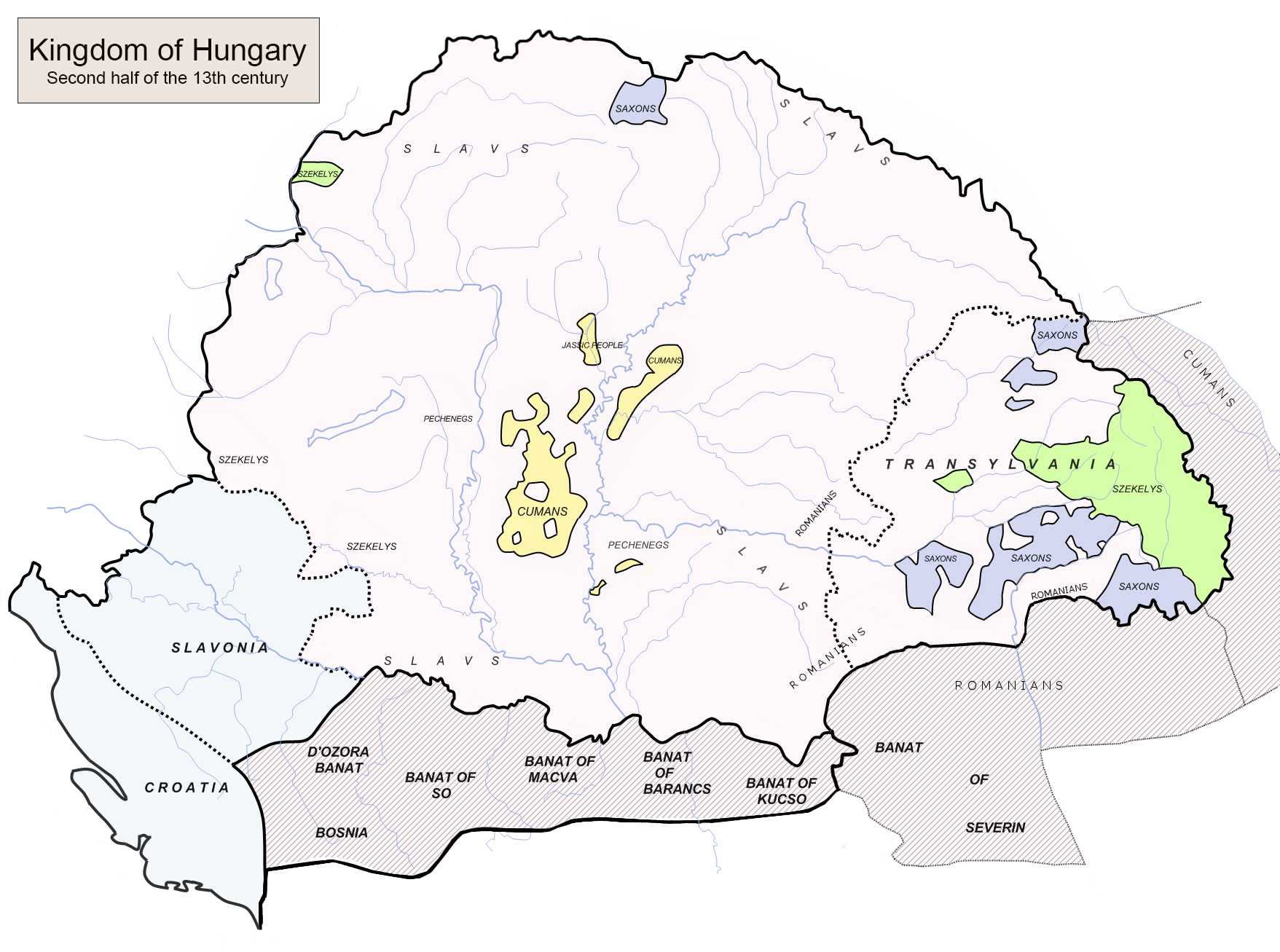
Banates of the Kingdom of Hungary on the southern borderlands

Regions ruled and influenced by Kingdom of Hungary, besides those in Croatia and Bosnia, were also formed as banates usually as frontier provinces in today's Serbia, Romania and Bulgaria. It includes:

- Banate of Só (12th century-1410) and Banate of Usora (12/13th century-1324/1463) which rulership was contested by the Banate and Kingdom of Bosnia
- Banate of Severin (1228–1526) which in the 16th century was divided between Hungary (see Banate of Lugos and Karánsebes) and Wallachia (see Great Banship of Craiova, Banat of Craiova)
- Banate of Macsó (1254–1284, 1319–1496)
- Banate of Braničevo, Banate of Kučevo and Banate of Baranja (13th century) contested between Hungarian king, Bulgarians Darman and Kudelin and Serbian Stefan Dragutin
- Banate of Bulgaria (1365–1369)

As part of the anti-Ottoman defensive system were formed:

- Banate of Belgrade (1427–1521) in Serbia
- Banate of Jajce (1463–1527) and Srebrenik (1464–1521/1521) in Bosnia

In 1921 temporarily existed Lajtabánság in Burgenland (Austria).

=== Bulgaria ===
The title ban was also awarded in the Second Bulgarian Empire on few occasions, but remained an exception. One example was the 14th-century governor of Sredets (Sofia) Ban Yanuka.

=== Kingdom of Yugoslavia ===
Ban was also used in the 19th century Kingdom of Serbia and Kingdom of Yugoslavia between 1929 and 1941. Ban was the title of the governor of each province (called banovina) of the Kingdom of Yugoslavia between 1929 and 1941. The weight of the title was far less than that of a medieval ban's feudal office.

== Legacy ==
The word ban is preserved in many modern toponym and place names, in the regions where bans once ruled, as well as in the personal names.

A region in central Croatia, south of Sisak, is called Banovina or Banija.

The region of Banat in the Pannonian Basin between the Danube and the Tisza rivers, now in Romania, Serbia and Hungary.

In the toponymys Bando, Bandola, Banj dvor and Banj stol and Banovo polje in Lika,

In Bosnia and Herzegovina numerous toponyms exist, such as Banbrdo, village Banova Jaruga, city Banovići, and possibly Banja Luka.

The term ban is still used in the phrase banski dvori ("ban's court") for the buildings that host high government officials. The Banski dvori in Zagreb hosts the Croatian Government, while the Banski dvor in Banja Luka hosted the President of Republika Srpska (a first-tier subdivision of Bosnia and Herzegovina) until 2008. The building known as Bela banovina ("the white banovina") in Novi Sad hosts the parliament and government of the Autonomous Province of Vojvodina in Serbia. The building received this name because it previously hosted the administration of Danube Banovina (1929–1941). Banovina is also the colloquial name of the city hall building in Split, and of the administrative building (rectorate and library) of the University of Niš.

In Croatian Littoral banica or banić signified "small silver coins", in Vodice banica signified "unknown, old coins". The Banovac was a coin struck between 1235 and 1384. In the sense of money same is in Romania, Bulgaria (bronze coins), and Old Polish (shilling).

The term is also found in personal surnames: Ban, Banić, Banović, Banovac, Balaban, Balabanić.

Banović Strahinja, a 1981 Yugoslavian adventure film, is based on Strahinja Banović, a fictional hero of Serbian epic poetry.

== See also ==
- Ban of Croatia
- Ban of Slavonia
- Banate of Bosnia
- Banate of Severin
- Banate of Macsó
- Banate of Braničevo
- Banate of Lugos and Karánsebes
- Banate of Kučevo
- Danube Banovina
- Banovina
- Banat
- Župan
- Bandon
- Marzban
