= Banate of Bosnia =

1154–1377 state in Southeast Europe

Banate of Bosnia Boszniai Bánság (Hungarian) Бановина Босна (Serbo-Croatian) Banovina Bosna
- Banate of the Kingdom of Hungary
- 1154–1377
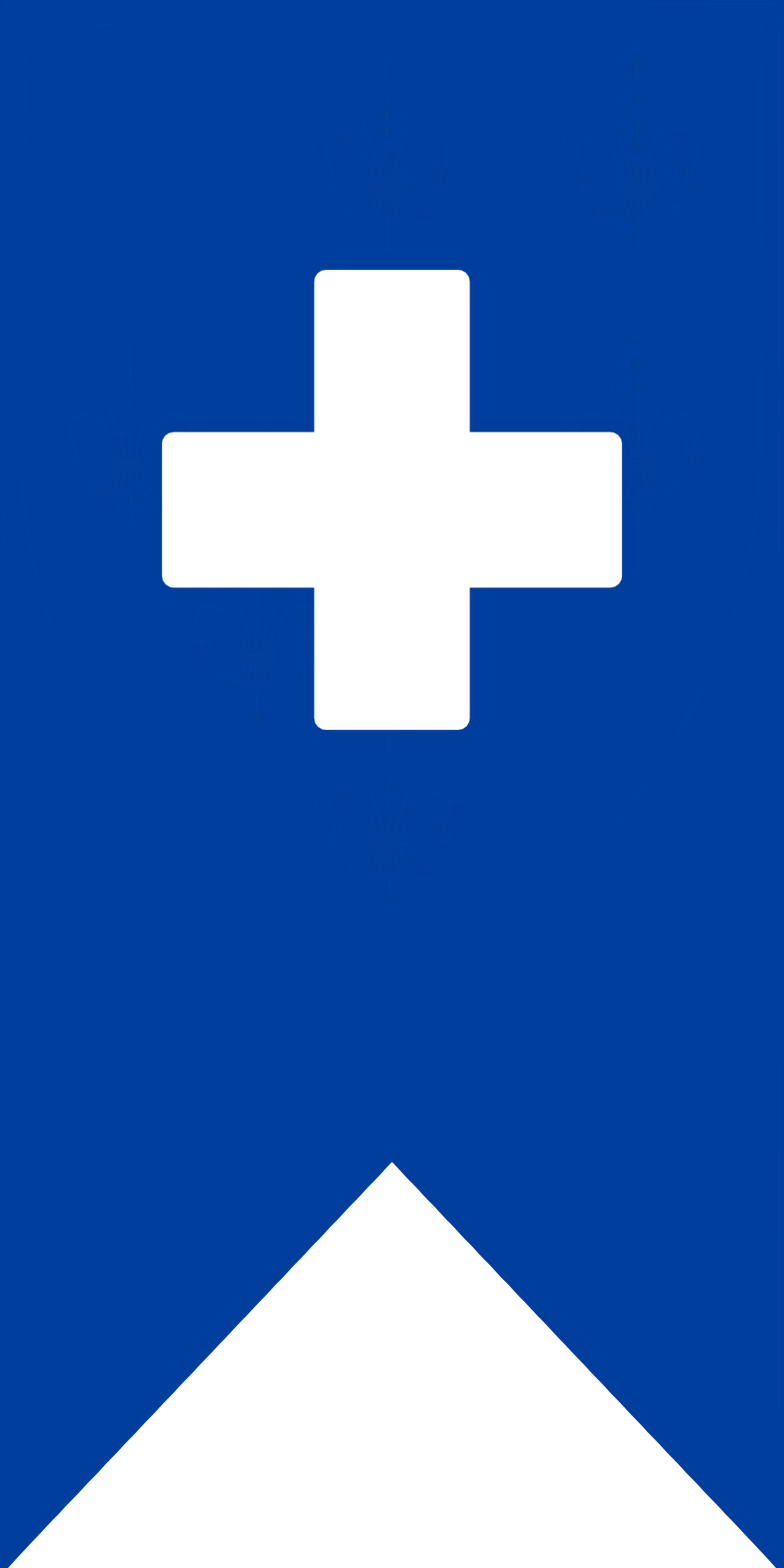
- Banner Coat of arms

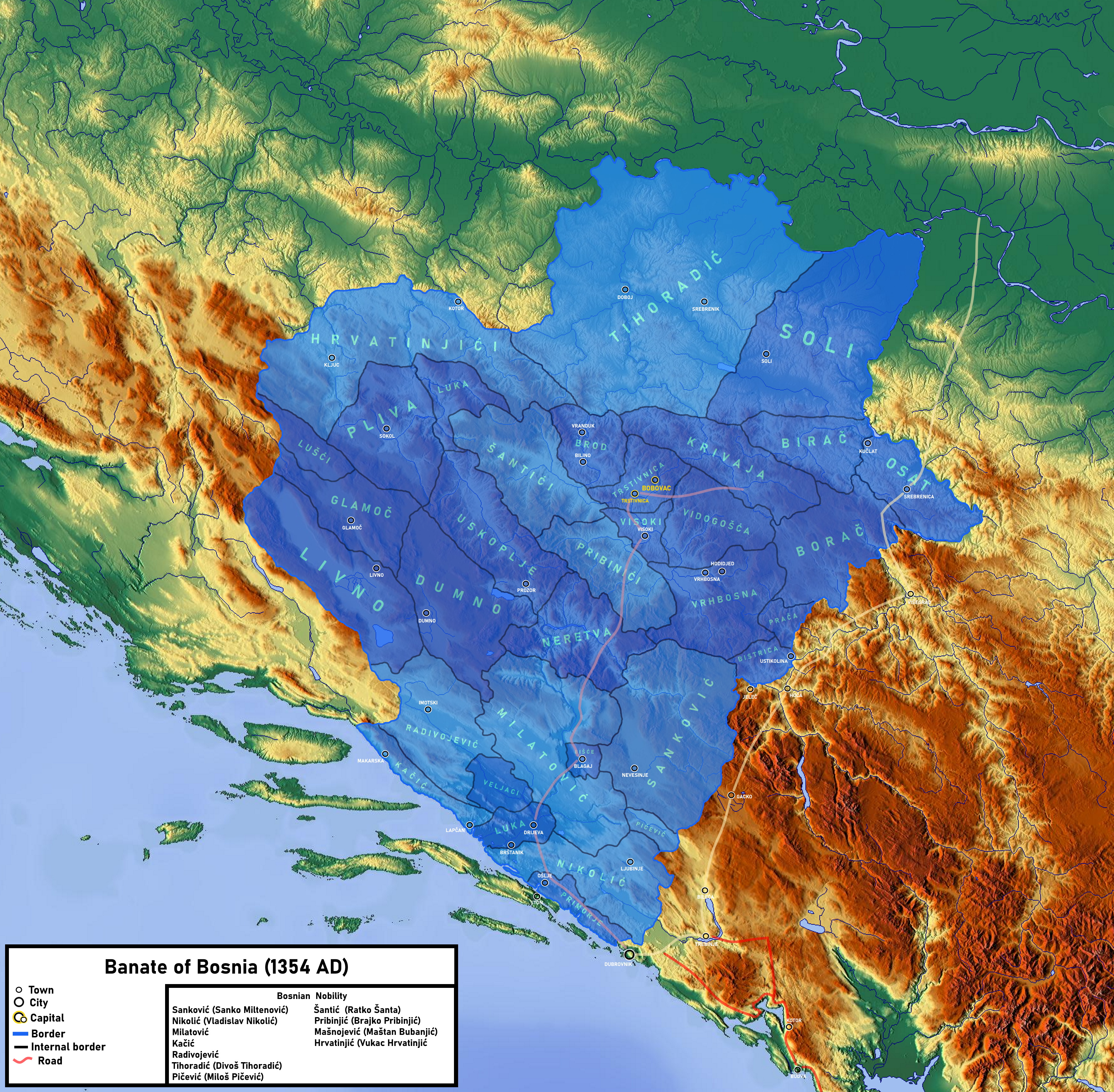
- Banate of Bosnia and it's internal divisions in 1354
- Capital: Visoko, Bobovac, Sutjeska
- Government
  - Type: Feudal banate (Decentralized monarchy governed by a noble assembly - Stanak)
- Ban
  - 1154–1164 (first known): Ban Borić
  - 1367–1377 (last ban): Tvrtko I
- History
  - First known Ban (Ban Borić): 1154
  - Tvrtko I crowned King of Bosnia: 26 October 1377 1377
Preceded by	Succeeded by
Bosnia (early polity)	Kingdom of Bosnia
- Today part of: Bosnia and Herzegovina; Croatia; Montenegro; Serbia

The Banate of Bosnia (Serbo-Croatian: Banovina Bosna / Бановина Босна), or Bosnian Banate (Bosanska banovina / Босанска бановина), was a medieval state located in what is today Bosnia and Herzegovina. Although Hungarian kings viewed Bosnia as part of Hungarian Crown Lands, the Banate of Bosnia was a de facto independent state for most of its existence. It was founded in the mid-12th century and existed until 1377 with interruptions under the Šubić family between 1299 and 1324. In 1377, it was elevated to a kingdom. The greater part of its history was marked by a religiopolitical controversy revolving around the native Christian Bosnian Church condemned as heretical by the dominant Chalcedonian Christian churches, namely the Catholic and Eastern Orthodox churches, with the Catholic Church being particularly antagonistic and persecuting its members through the Hungarians.

== Geography ==
Geography was a decisive factor in the development of the Banate. The state's core territory, the land of Bosna, was formed in the mountainous region of the upper and middle course of the Bosna river.

This area was geographically isolated, enclosed by the high, forested mountains of the Dinaric Alps. These mountains acted as a natural fortress, separating Bosnia from the Pannonian Basin (and Hungary) to the north and the coastal lands of Dalmatia and Hum to the south. As noted by historians, outside powers had little control of these "mountainous and somewhat peripheral regions", which directly contributed to the Banate's ability to function as a de facto independent state despite frequent foreign claims (Hungarian or Byzantine). The state's territorial evolution followed the river valleys, expanding north to include the regions of Usora and Soli and south to acquire Zahumlje (Hum).

== History ==
=== Historical background ===
Béla II of Hungary in 1135 adopted the title of King of Rama (possibly referring to Bosnia), and appointed his second son Ladislaus II of Hungary as Duke of Bosnia (Boznensem ducatum). During the 12th century, rulers within the Banate of Bosnia acted increasingly autonomously from Hungary and/or Byzantium. In reality, outside powers had little control of the mountainous and somewhat peripheral regions which made up Bosnian Banate.

=== Early history and Kulin ===
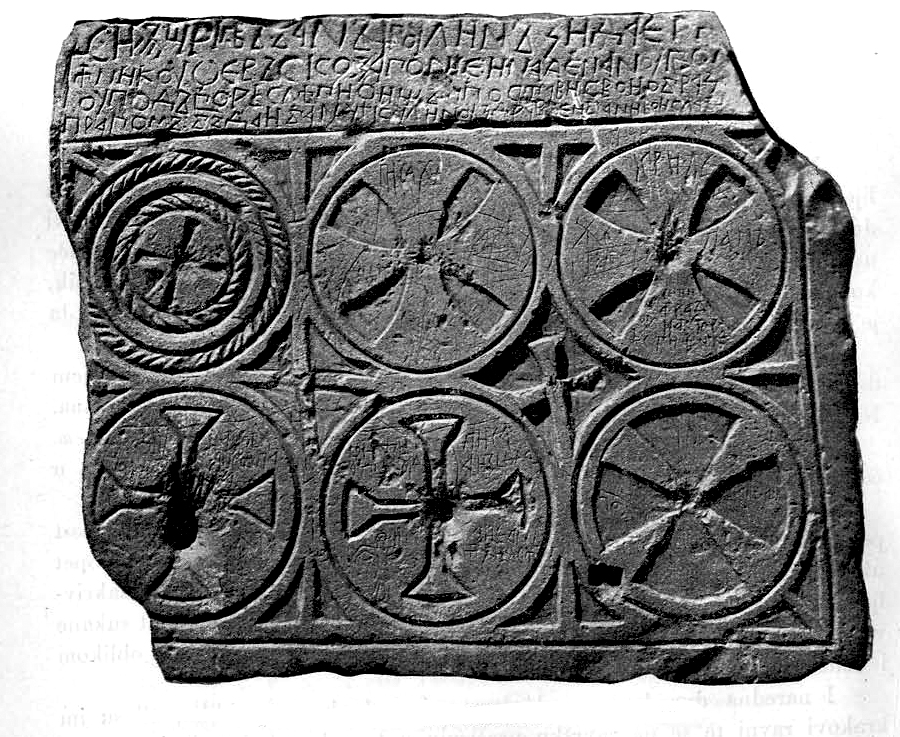
Kulin Ban's plate from 1193, found in Biskupići

Ban Borić appears as the first known Bosnian ruler in 1154, as a Hungarian vassal, who participated in the Siege of Braničevo as part of the Hungarian King's forces. In 1167 he was involved in offensives against the Byzantines when he provided troops for Hungarian armies. War ended with the retreat of Hungarian army in Battle of Sirmium, near Belgrade in 1167. Borić's involvement in the war indicates that Bosnia was part of the Hungarian kingdom at that time, as war Byzantine–Hungarian treaty regards Bosnia "as part of Hungarian dominion taken by the Byzantines", and Byzantine emperor Manuel I Komnenos used in honorific title of the "dalmatikos, ougrikos, bosthnikos, krobatikos", and panegyric of Michael Anchialos mentioned to "let the Croat and the Bosnian be enrolled in the tables of the Romans".

Bosnia was part of Byzantium from 1167 to 1180, but as Bosnia was a distant land, rule over it was probably nominal, and during the time of Ban Kulin (1180–1204) by practical means was an independent state, but that was constantly challenged by Hungarian kings who tried to reestablish their pre-Byzantine period authority or acted as "political seniors". In the time of emperor Manuel I Komnenos death (1180), Kulin managed to free it from Byzantine influence through the alliance to Hungarian king Béla III, and with help of Serbian ruler Stefan Nemanja and his brother Miroslav of Hum, with whom he successfully waged a war in 1183 against the Byzantines. Kulin secured peace, although it continued as a nominal vassal to Hungarian king. but there is no evidence that Hungarians occupied areas of central Bosnia.

The Pope’s emissaries of that time reached to Kulin directly and referred to him as "lord of Bosnia". Kulin was often referred as "veliki ban bosanski" (Great Bosnian Ban) by contemporaries, and by his successor Matej Ninoslav. He had a powerful effect on the development of early Bosnian history, under whose rule an age of peace and prosperity existed.

In 1189, Ban Kulin issued the first written Bosnian document, now known as the Charter of Ban Kulin, in Bosnian Cyrillic, diplomatic document regarding the trade relations with the city of Ragusa (Dubrovnik). Kulin's rule also marked the start of a controversy involving the indigenous Bosnian Church (a branch of Bogomilism), a Christian sect considered heretical by both the Roman Catholic and Eastern Orthodox Church. Under him, the "Bosnian Age of Peace and Prosperity" would come to exist.

=== Heresy and Bilino Polje abjuration ===
In 1203, Serbian Grand Prince Vukan Nemanjić accused Kulin of heresy and lodged an official appeal to the pope. At Bilino Polje Kulin signed abjuration stating that he was always a faithful Catholic, and saved Banate of Bosnia from outside intervention. In 1203, Kulin moved to defuse the threat of foreign intervention. A synod was held at his instigation on 6 April. Following the Abjuration of Bilino Polje, Kulin succeeded in keeping the Bosnian Diocese under the Ragusan Archdiocese, thus limiting Hungarian influence. The errors abjured by the Bosnian nobility in Bilino Polje seem to have been errors of practice, stemming from ignorance, rather than heretical doctrines. Kulin also reaffirmed his allegiance to Hungary, but despite this, Hungary's authority remained only nominal.

Andrew II, in 1225, gave Bosnia to the Pope who expected that King Andrew II, as the nominal overlord of Bosnia, clean the area of heretics, but instead Andrew transferred that responsibility to Archbishop Ugrin Csák The Hungarian King's ambitions remained unchanged long after Kulin's death in 1204. Kulin's policy was poorly continued since the Ban's death in 1204 by his son and heir, Stjepan Kulinić, who seems to have remained aligned with the Catholic Church. Stjepan was eventually deposed in 1232.

The Bosnian Church forcibly replaced Kulinić with a nobleman called Matej Ninoslav (1232–50). This caused bad relations with Serbia as the previous ruler was related to the Nemanjić dynasty. Around this time, a relative of Ninoslav, Prijezda I, converted back to Catholicism (he previously switched to the Bosnian Church for a short period of time). Ninoslav eventually became a protector of the Bosnian Church. In 1234 Hungarian king Andrew II gave the Banate of Bosnia to Duke Coloman. To make matters worse, the legitimate successor for the Bosnian throne of the Kulinić dynasty, count Sibislav of Usora, son of former Ban Stjepan, started to attack Ninoslav's positions, attempting to take the Banate for himself. Pope Gregory IX replaced the heretical Bosnian bishop in 1235 with John of Wildeshausen, then Master General of the Dominican Order and later declared a saint, and confirmed Duke Coloman as the new legitimate Ban of Bosnia.

=== Bosnian Crusade ===
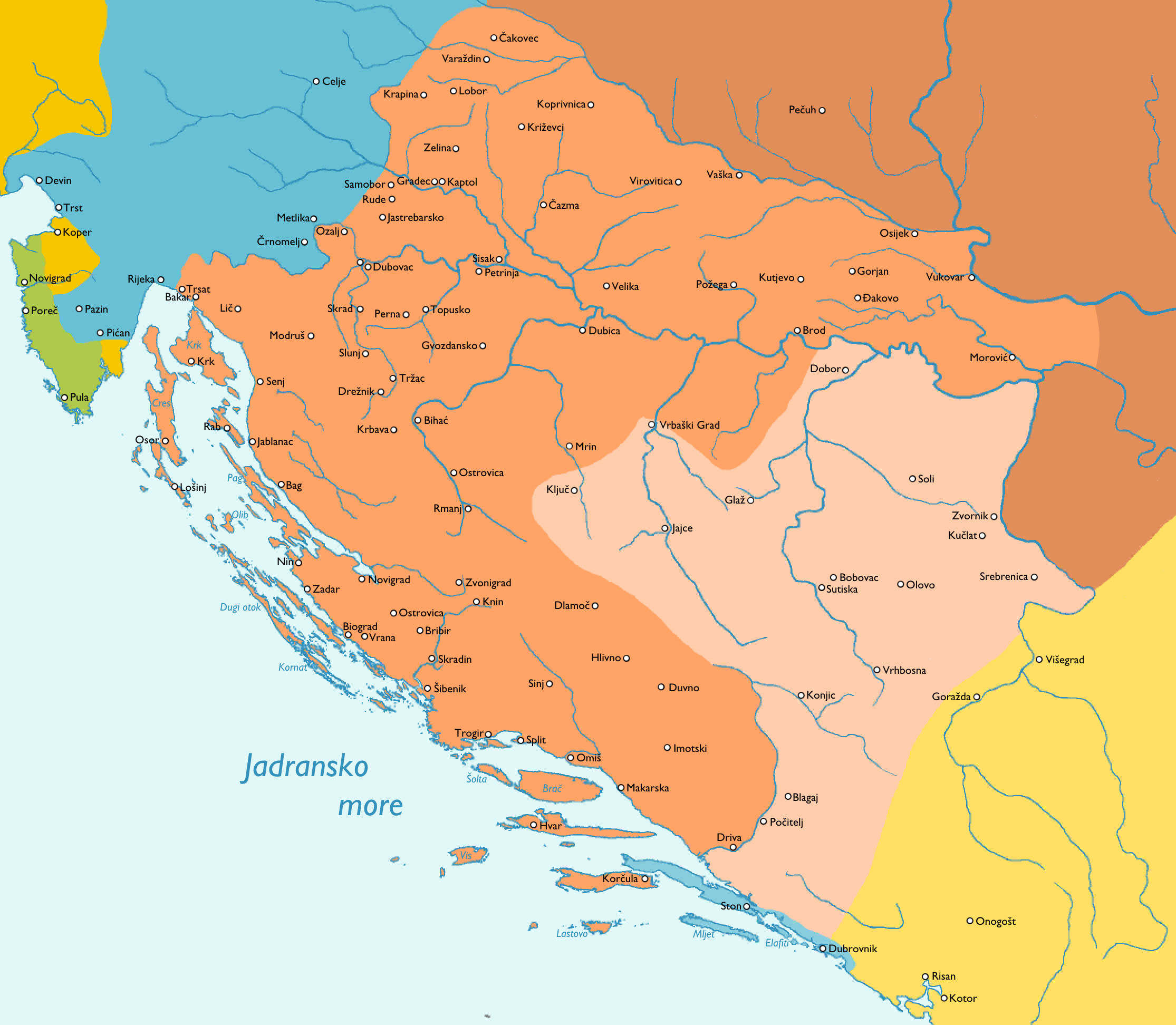
The Banate of Bosnia in 1358

The Bosnian Crusade led by bishop John and Coloman lasted for five full years. The war only funnelled more support to Ninoslav, as only Sibislav took the Pope's side in the Crusade. Ninoslav issued an edict to the Republic of Ragusa on 22 May 1240, stating that he placed it under his protection in case of an attack by Serbian king Stefan Vladislav. The support from Ragusa was essential to support Matej Ninoslav's warfare. The only significant impact the Bosnian Crusade had was augmenting the anti-Hungarian sentiment among the local population, a major factor in politics that contributed to the Ottoman conquest of Bosnia in 1463 and lasted beyond it.

It was also a response due to the bad relations between Bosnia and Serbia, as Serbia sent no aid to Ninoslav contrary to the traditional alliance. Coloman passed the governorship of the Banate to Ninoslav's distant cousin, Prijezda, who only managed to hold it for two or three years. In 1241, the Tatars invaded Hungary, so Coloman had to fall back from Bosnia. Matej Ninoslav immediately retook control, while Prijezda fled to Hungary in exile. King Bela IV was on the retreat which enabled Ninoslav to restore control over most of Bosnia. The Tatars were fought off by the Croats, sending them back across Bosnia, bringing more destruction to the land. The edict to Ragusa was re-issued in March 1244. Ninoslav was involved in the civil war that erupted in Croatia between Trogir and Split, taking Split's side. King Bela IV of Hungary was greatly frustrated and considered this a conspiracy, so he sent a contingent to Bosnia, but Ninoslav subsequently made peace. In 1248, Ninoslav cunningly saved his lands from yet another papal crusade requested by the Hungarian archbishop.

The remainder of his reign, Ban Ninoslav Matej dealt with inner matters in Bosnia. His death after 1249, possibly in 1250, brought some conflicts over the throne; as the Bosnian Church desired someone from their own sphere of interest, and the Hungarians desired someone that they could easily control. Eventually, King Bela IV conquered and pacified Bosnia and succeed in putting Ninoslav 's Catholic cousin Prijezda as the Bosnian Ban. Ban Prijezda ruthlessly persecuted the Bosnian Church. In 1254 the Croatian Ban shortly conquered Zahumlje from the Serbian king Stefan Uroš I during Hungary's war against Serbia, but a subsequent peace agreement restored Zahumlje to Serbia.

Another Hungarian campaign was launched against Bosnia in 1253, but there was no evidence that they reached the Bosnian Banate. However, Hungary did control northern regions of Usora and Soli through their vassal rulers.The Bosnian Banate continued to exist as a de facto independent entity even after Ninoslav.

=== Kotromanić dynasty ===
Prijezda I's realm (founder of Kotromanić dynasty) was significantly smaller than Ninoslav's, the northern regions of Usora and Soli having been annexed by the Hungarian crown. In 1284 this contiguous territory was granted to King Ladislaus IV of Hungary's brother-in-law, the deposed Serbian king Dragutin. The same year Prijezda arranged the marriage of his son, Stephen I, with Dragutin's daughter Elizabeth. The marriage had great consequences in the subsequent centuries, when Stephen and Elizabeth's Kotromanić descendants claimed the throne of Serbia. Prijezda was forced to withdraw from the throne in 1287 due to his old age. He spent his last hours on his estate in Zemljenik. The Hungarians reasserted their authority over territories such as Soli, Usora, Vrbas, Sana in the early 13th century. Territories that Ban Prijezda, a loyal Hungarian vassal, controlled was possibly in northern parts of today's Bosnia between rivers Drina and Bosna. The Banate of Bosnia to the south remained independent, but we do not know its rulers, the successors of Ban Ninoslav.

Prijezda I was succeeded by Prijezda II who ruled independently from 1287–1290, but later together with his brother Stephen I Kotromanić.

=== Restoration and Expansion ===
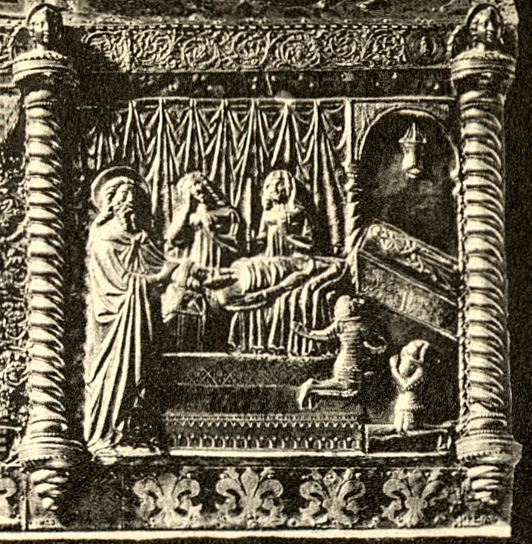
Tvrtko with his mother, brother and cousin Elizabeth at the deathbed of his uncle Stephen, as depicted on the Chest of Saint Simeon in the late 1370s

During the end of the 13th and about the first quarter of the 14th century, till the Battle of Bliska,the Bosnian banate was under the rule of Croatian bans from the Šubić family. After defeat in Battle of Bliska, Mladen II was captured by Charles I who took him to Hungary, which sparked the Kotromanić dynasty's restoration.

Stephen II was the Bosnian Ban from 1314, but in reality from 1322 to 1353 together with his brother, Vladislav Kotromanić in 1326–1353.

By 1326 Ban Stephen II attacked Serbia in a military alliance with the Republic of Ragusa and conquered Zahumlje (or Hum), gaining more of the Adriatic Sea coast, from the mouth of the Neretva to Konavle, with areas of significant Orthodox population under the Archbishopric of Ohrid and mixed Orthodox and Catholic populations in coastal areas and around Ston. He also expanded into Završje, including the fields of Glamoč, Duvno and Livno. Immediately after the death of Serbian King Stefan Uroš II Milutin in 1321, he had no problem in acquiring his lands of Usora and Soli, which he fully annexed in 1324.

In 1329, Ban Stephen II Kotromanić launched another military campaign into Serbia, assaulting Lord Vitomir of Trebinje and Konavle, but the main portion of his force was defeated by the Young King Dušan who commanded the forces of King Stefan Dečanski at Priboj. The Ban's horse was killed in the battle, and he would have lost his life if his vassal Vuk had not given him his own horse. By doing so, Vuk sacrificed his own life, and was killed by the Serbian troops in open battle. Thus the Ban managed to add Nevesinje and Zagorje to his realm.

Throughout his reign in the fourteenth century, Stephen ruled the lands from Sava to the Adriatic and from Cetina to Drina. He doubled the size of his state, and achieved full independence from surrounding countries. Ban Stephen II played Venice and the Hungarian kings against each other, slowly ruling more and more independently and soon initiated a conspiracy with some members of the Croatian and Hungarian nobility against his Hungarian liege and father-in-law.

In 1346 Zadar finally returned to Venice, and the Hungarian King, seeing that he had lost the war, made peace in 1348.The Ban of Croatia Mladen II Šubić was greatly opposed to Stephen II's policy, accusing him of treason and the relations between the two Bans worsened ever afterwards. By 1342 the Franciscan Province of Bosnia was established. During the reign of Stjepan II Kotromanić all three churches (Bosnian Church, Orthodox, Catholic) were active in the Bosnian Banate.

=== Reign of Tvrtko ===
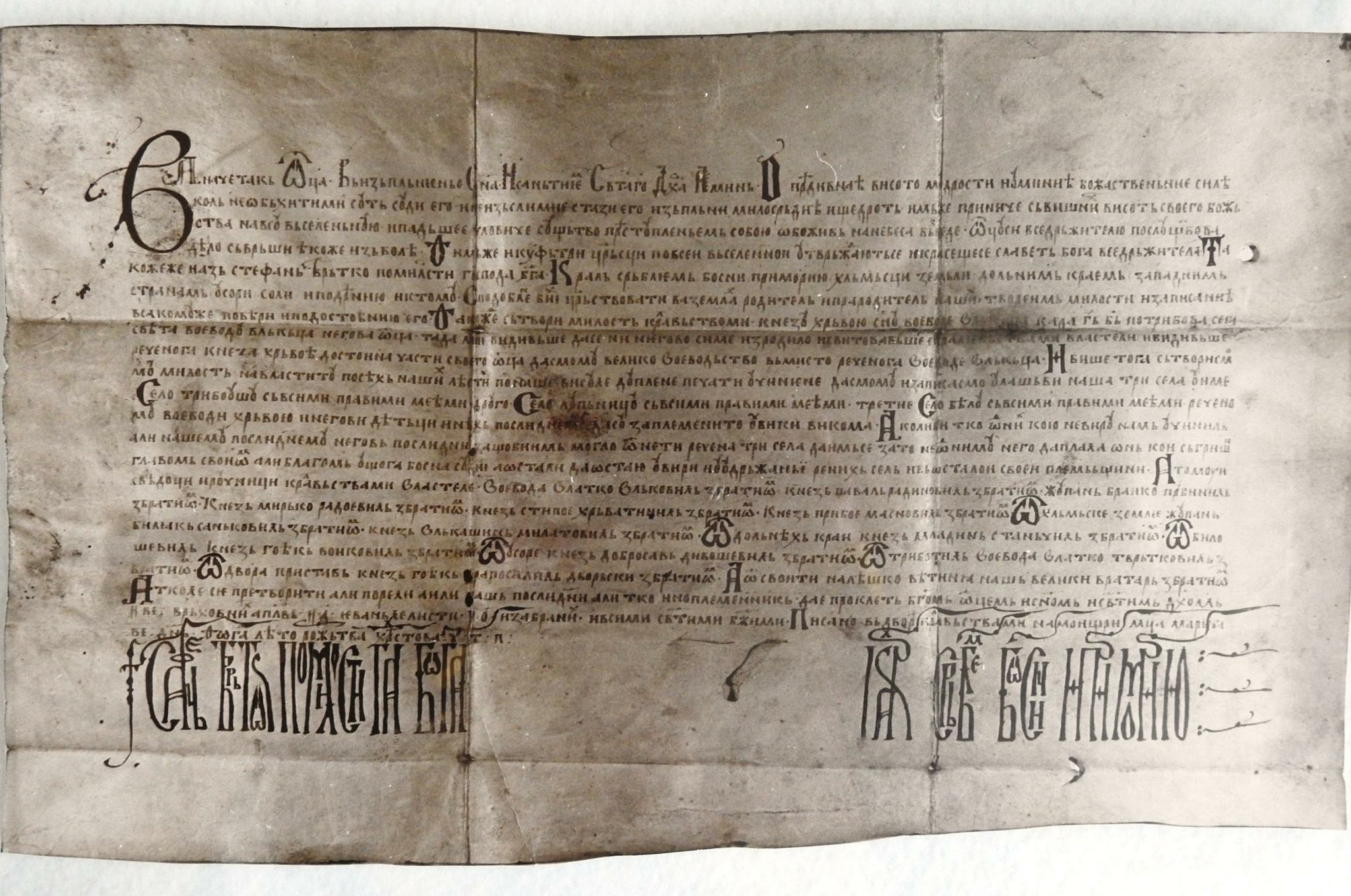
Charter of King Tvrtko I Kotromanić, written in Moštre

Tvrtko, however, was only about fifteen years old at the time, so his father Vladislav governed as regent. Soon after his accession, Tvrtko traveled with his father throughout the realm, to settle relations with his vassals. Jelena Šubić, Tvrtko's mother, replaced Vladislav as regent upon his death in 1354. She immediately traveled to Hungary to obtain consent to Tvrtko's accession from King Louis I, his overlord. Following her return, Jelena held an assembly (stanak) in Mile, with the mother and her son confirming the possessions and privileges of the noblemen of "all of Bosnia, Donji Kraji, Zagorje, and the Hum land".

At the start of his personal rule the young Ban somehow considerably increased his power. Although he constantly emphasized his subordinance to the King, Tvrtko started regarding the loyalty of the Donji Kraji noblemen to Louis as treachery against himself. In 1363, a conflict broke out between the two men. By April, the Hungarian King had begun amassing an army An army led by Louis himself attacked Donji Kraji, where the nobility was divided in its loyalties between Tvrtko and Louis. A month later an army led by the Palatine of Hungary Nicholas Kont and the Archbishop of Esztergom Nicholas Apáti struck Usora. Vlatko Vukoslavić deserted to Louis and surrendered to him the important fortress of Ključ, but Vukac Hrvatinić succeeded in defending the Soko Grad fortress in the župa of Pliva, forcing the Hungarians to retreat. In Usora, the Srebrenik Fortress held out against a "massive attack" by the royal army, which suffered the embarrassment of losing the King's seal. The successful defense of Srebrenik marked Tvrtko's first victory against the Hungarian king. The unity of the local magnates waned as soon as the Hungarians were defeated, weakening Tvrtko's position and that of a united Bosnia.

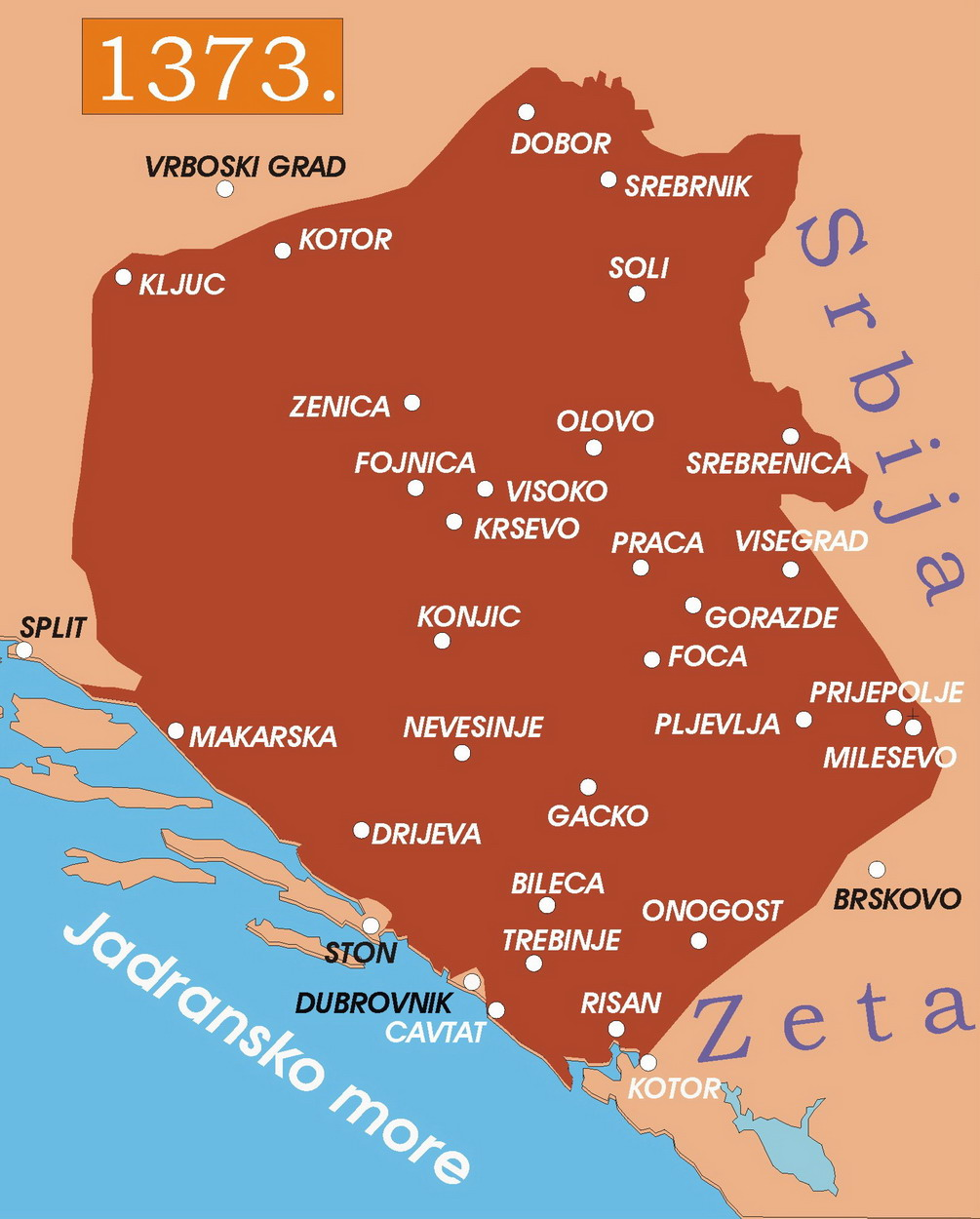
The Banate of Bosnia in 1373

The anarchy escalated, and in February the following year, the magnates revolted against Tvrtko and dethroned him. He was replaced by his younger brother Vuk, Tvrtko and Jelena took refuge at the Hungarian royal court, where they were welcomed by Tvrtko's former enemy and overlord, King Louis. Tvrtko returned to Bosnia in March and reestablished control over a part of the country by the end of the month, including the areas of Donji Kraji, Rama (where he then resided), Hum, and Usora.

Throughout the following year, Tvrtko forced Vuk southwards, eventually compelling him to flee to Ragusa. Sanko, Vuk's last supporter, submitted to Tvrtko in late summer and was allowed to retain his holdings. Ragusan officials made an effort to procure peace between the feuding brothers, and in 1368, Vuk asked Pope Urban V to intervene with King Louis I on his behalf. Those efforts were futile; but by 1374, Tvrtko had reconciled with Vuk on very generous terms.

The death of Dušan the Mighty and the accession of his son Uroš the Weak, in December 1355, was soon followed by the breakup of the once-powerful and threatening Serbian Empire. It disintegrated into autonomous lordships that, by themselves, could not resist Bosnia. This paved the way for Tvrtko to expand towards the east, but internal problems prevented him from seizing the opportunity immediately. By the mid-14th century, the Bosnian banate reached its peak under the young ban Tvrtko Kotromanić who came into power in 1353, and had himself crowned as King on 26 October 1377.

== Government and social structure ==
Power in the Banate of Bosnia was decentralized, based on a complex relationship between the Ban and the powerful nobility.

=== The Ban ===
The state was headed by the Ban. While early rulers like Ban Borić were vassals of the Hungarian King, more powerful bans such as Kulin and Stephen II operated as de facto independent sovereigns. The Ban's power was hereditary but not absolute; it depended on the support of the most powerful noble families.

=== The Stanak ===
The key institution of state was the Stanak (or Sabor), the assembly of all Bosnian nobility (vlastela). The Stanak held significant power: it formally elected and confirmed the new ban, decided on foreign policy (war and peace), approved charters and land grants, and served as the highest court, especially in disputes between the ban and the nobility. The Ban could not make major state decisions without the consent of the Stanak. An assembly held by Jelena Šubić and the young Tvrtko I in Mile in 1354, for the purpose of confirming the privileges of the nobility, illustrates the Stanak's role. The power of the magnates was most evident in 1366, when they revolted at the Stanak, dethroned Tvrtko I, and replaced him with his brother, Vuk.

=== The Nobility ===
Bosnian society was strictly feudal. Below the Ban was the high nobility, known as velikaši or magnates. These figures ruled large, semi-autonomous territories (such as the Hrvatinići in Donji Kraji or the Sankovići in Hum). Below them was a large class of lesser nobility (vlasteličići), who held smaller estates and provided military service to the magnates or the Ban.

== Economy ==
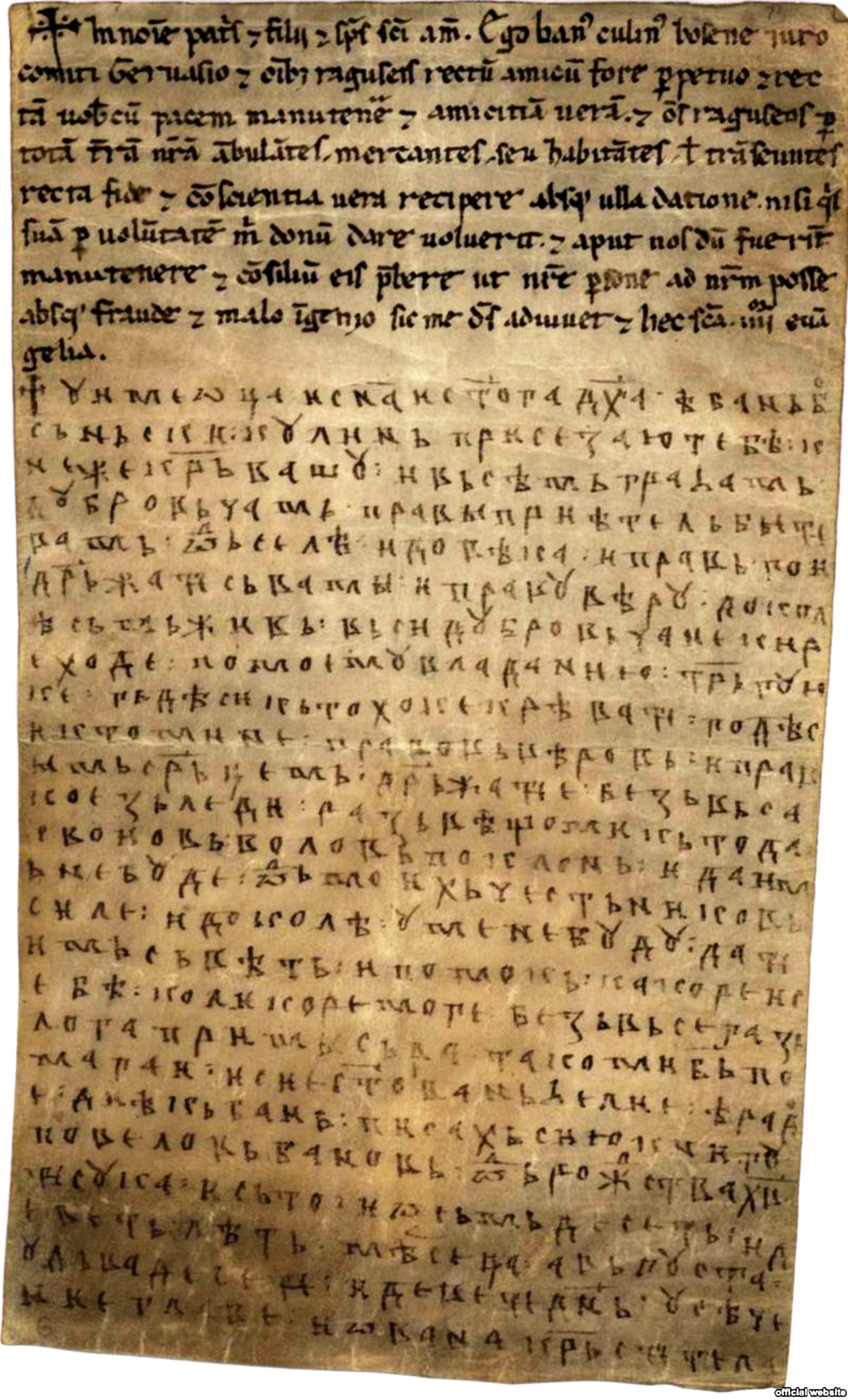
Charter of Ban Kulin, trade agreement between Bosnia and Republic of Ragusa

The second Bosnian ruler, Ban Kulin strengthened the country's economy through treaties with Dubrovnik in 1189 and Venice. Charter of Ban Kulin was a trade agreement between Bosnia and the Republic of Ragusa that effectively regulated Ragusan trade rights in Bosnia written on 29 August 1189. It is one of the oldest written state documents in the Balkans and is among the oldest historical documents written in Bosančica.

The export of metal ores and metalwork (mainly silver, copper and lead) formed the backbone of the Bosnian economy, as these goods along others like wax, silver, gold, honey and rawhide were transported over the Dinaric Alps to the seashore by Via Narenta, where they were bought chiefly by the Republics of Ragusa and Venice. Access to Via Narenta was crucial for Bosnian economy, which was possible only after ban Stephen II managed to take control of the trading route during his conquests of Hum. The main trading centres were Fojnica and Podvisoki.

== Religion ==
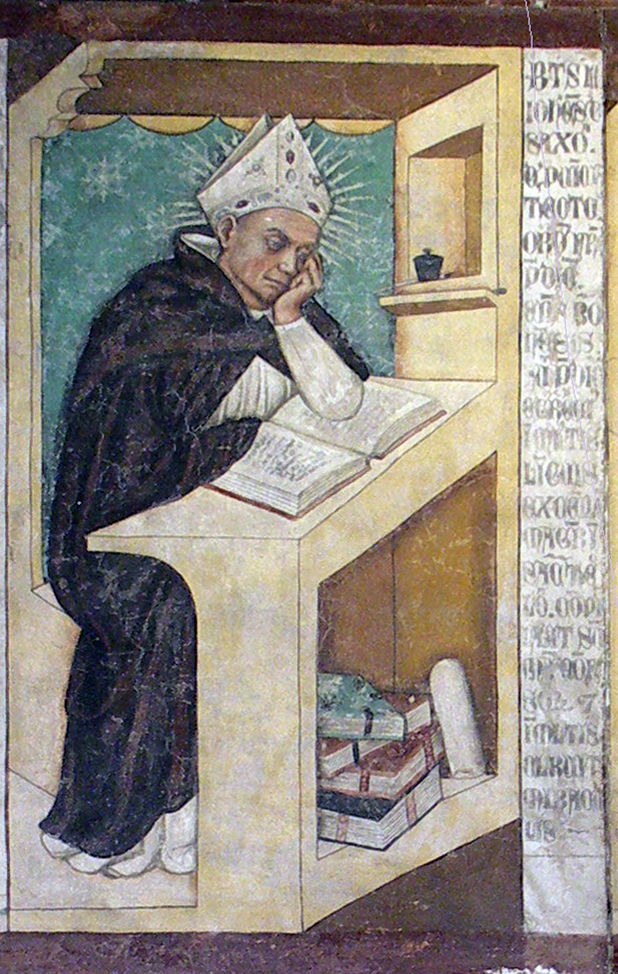
John of Wildeshausen, Bishop of Bosnia

Christian missions emanating from Rome and Constantinople started pushing into the Balkans in the 9th century, Christianizing the South Slavs and establishing boundaries between the ecclesiastical jurisdictions of the See of Rome and the See of Constantinople. The East–West Schism then led to the establishment of Roman Catholicism in Croatia and most of Dalmatia, while Eastern Orthodoxy came to prevail in Serbia. Lying in-between, the mountainous Bosnia was nominally under Rome, but Catholicism never became firmly established due to a weak church organization and poor communications. Medieval Bosnia thus remained a "no-man's land between faiths" rather than a meeting ground between the two Churches, leading to a unique religious history and the emergence of an "independent and somewhat heretical church".

While Bosnia remained at least nominally Catholic in the High Middle Ages, the Bishop of Bosnia was a local cleric chosen by Bosnians and then sent to the Archbishop of Ragusa solely for ordination. Although the Papacy already insisted on using Latin as the liturgical language, Bosnian Catholics retained Church Slavonic language. The Franciscans order arrived in Bosnia in the later half of the 13th century, aiming to eradicate the teachings of the Bosnian Church. The Serbian Orthodox Metropolitanate of Dabar and Bosnia and Eparchy of Zachlumia, Herzegovina, and the Littoral was founded in 1219. The first Franciscan vicariate in Bosnia was founded in 1339/40. Stephen II Kotromanić was instrumental in establishing of the vicariate. By 1385. they had four monasteries in Olovo, Mile, Kraljeva Sutjeska and Lašva.

== List of rulers ==
- Ban Borić (1154—1164)
- Ban Kulin (1180—1204)
- Stephen Kulinić (1204—1232)
- Matej Ninoslav (1232—1250)
- Prijezda I (1250—1287)
- Prijezda II (1287—1290)
- Stjepan I Kotromanić (1287—1314), together with Prijezda II 1287—1290, as a vassal ban 1290—1314
- Mladen I Šubić of Bribir (1299—1304)
- Mladen II Šubić of Bribir (1304—1322)
- Stjepan II Kotromanić (1314—1353), as vassal ban 1314—1322, independently 1322—1353
- Tvrtko I Kotromanić (1353—1366)
- Vuk Kotromanić (1366—1367)
- Tvrtko I Kotromanić (1367—1377)

== Sources ==
- Bataković, Dušan T. (1996). The Serbs of Bosnia & Herzegovina: History and Politics. Paris: Dialogue. ISBN 9782911527104.
- Ćirković, Sima (2004). The Serbs. Malden: Blackwell Publishing. ISBN 9781405142915.
- Ćirković, Sima (1964). Istorija srednjovekovne bosanske države [History of the medieval Bosnian state] (in Serbo-Croatian). Srpska književna zadruga.
- Ćošković, Pejo (2009). Kotromanići (in Serbo-Croatian). Miroslav Krleža Institute of Lexikography.
- Curta, Florin (2006). Southeastern Europe in the Middle Ages, 500–1250. Cambridge: Cambridge University Press.
- Dzino, Danijel (2023). Early Medieval Hum and Bosnia, ca. 450-1200: Beyond Myths. Taylor & Francis. ISBN 9781000893434.
- Fine, John Van Antwerp Jr. (1991) [1983]. The Early Medieval Balkans: A Critical Survey from the Sixth to the Late Twelfth Century. Ann Arbor, Michigan: University ofD Michigan Press. ISBN 0472081497.
- Fine, John Van Antwerp Jr. (1994) [1987]. The Late Medieval Balkans: A Critical Survey from the Late Twelfth Century to the Ottoman Conquest. Ann Arbor, Michigan: University of Michigan Press. ISBN 0472082604.
- Hadžijahić, Muhamed (2004). Povijest Bosne u IX i X stoljeću (from the original University of Michigan ed.). Sarajevo: Preporod. ISBN 9789958820274.
- Klaić, Nada (1989). Srednjovjekovna Bosna: Politički položaj bosanskih vladara do Tvrtkove krunidbe (1377. g.). Zagreb: Grafički zavod Hrvatske. ISBN 9788639901042.
- Malcolm, Noel (1994). Bosnia: A Short History. New York: NYU Press. ISBN 9780814755204.
- Orbini, Mauro (1601). Il Regno de gli Slavi hoggi corrottamente detti Schiavoni. Pesaro: Apresso Girolamo Concordia.
- Орбин, Мавро (1968). Краљевство Словена. Београд: Српска књижевна задруга.
- Suarez, S.J., Michael F.; Woudhuysen, H.R. (2013). "The History of the Book in the Balkans". The Book: A Global History. Oxford University Press. pp. 506–07. ISBN 978-0-19-967941-6.
- Treadgold, Warren (1997). A History of the Byzantine State and Society. Stanford, California: Stanford University Press. ISBN 0-8047-2630-2.
- Vego, Marko (1982). Postanak srednjovjekovne bosanske države. Sarajevo: Svjetlost.
