= Prijezda I, Ban of Bosnia =

Ban of Bosnia

Prijezda

Ban of Bosnia
- Reign: 1250–1287
- Predecessor: Matej Ninoslav
- Successor: Stephen I
- Died: 1287–1290; Bosnia
- Issue: Stephen I Prijezda II; Vuk
- House: Presumably Kotromanić
- Religion: Roman Catholicism (conversion)

Prijezda I (Serbian Cyrillic: Пријезда I; pronounced [prǐjezda]; fl. 1233–1287) was the Ban of Bosnia as a vassal of the Hungarian Kingdom, ruling from c. 1250 until his death in 1287. He was a relative to his predecessor Matej Ninoslav, and is first mentioned in Papal letters regarding heretics in Bosnia. He stayed loyal to the Hungarian king.

== Life ==
=== Early life ===
Historiography is undecided on the origin of Prijezda. Some treat him as the first known member of the Kotromanić dynasty.

Prijezda is mentioned in one of Pope Gregory IX's letters dated 10 October 1233 to Matej Ninoslav, the Ban of Bosnia, as Ninoslav's relative and the ubanus ("vice-ban") and having recently "returned from the filth of heretical depravity to the purity of the Catholic faith". Ninoslav is recorded in another of the letters as having himself claimed that his ancestors were heretics. Prijezda had been imprisoned, and Pope Gregory IX ordered Dominican Order friars to free him if he stayed loyal to the Catholic faith and sent his son as a political hostage to the Dominican Order, which he did. Ninoslav then guaranteed for Prijezda's loyalty and his work in "hunting heretics", upon which Prijezda's son was released to him. Pope Gregory IX was delighted at Ninoslav's and Prijezda's recent conversion to Catholicism through the Dominican Order.

In 1234, Pope Gregory IX began the Bosnian Crusade to strengthen Catholicism in Bosnia, and that year Coloman of Galicia became the leader in the mission; while Coloman fought with the sword, bishop John of Wildeshausen fought with the book. Coloman was successful, and received the administration of Bosnia by August 1235, thereby becoming a feudal sovereign under his father Andrew II. Bishop John was exhausted and decided to leave, while Coloman likely led a war in 1236–1237, reportedly finished with "eradicating" heresy in a letter dated 26 April 1238. Coloman was aided by Sibislav, the knez of Usora and son of earlier Ban Stephen Kulinić. Ninoslav was not mentioned as having participated in the fight, and is mentioned by the Pope in letters dated 22 December 1238 and 27 December 1239 as having returned to heresy, having likely left the Catholic camp during Coloman's campaign. It seems that Prijezda joined the Hungarian camp against Ninoslav in 1240 and was a Hungarian candidate for the Bosnian banate. Ninoslav then accepted the new holdings of the Catholic church in Bosnia and gave away considerable rights to Hungary and the Catholic church, such as taxes and lands.

=== Ban of Bosnia ===
After Ninoslav's death in c. 1250, Prijezda joined the struggle for rule in Bosnia, and only managed to defeat his opponents and secure his office in 1254–1255. Some put his accession at c. 1250. He was under Hungarian influence throughout his reign. Béla IV campaigned in 1253 and subjugated Bosnia and divided it into banates, out of which Bosnia proper (the zemlja of Bosna) was given to his loyal subject Prijezda, while Béla's nephew Rastislav Mihailovich received Usora, Soli and Mačva.

As a Hungarian vassal, Prijezda received property in Podravina in 1255 and participated in the war against Bohemia in 1260. In the period of 1264–1280, the Hungarian kings constrained his reign through giving titles related to Bosnia (ban, duke) to junior members of the Arpad dynasty and the Hungarian–Croatian nobility. In 1273, Stephen II Gutkeled received the title of Ban of Bosnia, but Prijezda was still the de facto ruler. In 1280, heresy in Bosnia was still present, as per Hungarian king Ladislaus IV. In 1284, Prijezda's son Stephen married Jelisaveta, the daughter of Serbian king of Syrmia, Stefan Dragutin. Ladislaus IV granted Mačva, Usora and Soli to Dragutin in the second half of 1284.

In the 1270s and 1280s, the magnates in Slavonia that emerged as the most powerful in the region were the Babonić brothers Radoslav and Stephen. As they became neighbours, Prijezda entered marital relations with the Babonić, either being forced to do so, or as an preemptive measure in case of a conflict, and gave up part of his lands. Prijezda gave the frontier župa (county) of Zemunik in the Vrbas basin (part of Donji Kraji) as a dowry to his daughter and Ladislaus, the son of Stephen Babonić, on 8 May 1287. The Latin-language charter regarding this has survived and is held at the National Archives of Hungary.

He died some time between May 1287 and 23 July 1290, when his sons Stephen and Prijezda II are mentioned as Bans, co-ruling in the beginning.

== Family ==
Prijezda had the following children:

- Stephen, ruled 1287/1290–1310, married Jelisaveta Nemanjić.
- Prijezda II (fl. 1290), co-ruled in 1287/1290, after which nothing more is known.
- Vuk (fl. 1287), only mentioned in the Zemunik charter.
- an unnamed daughter (fl. 1287) that married Ladislaus, the son of Stephen III Babonić.

== See also ==
- House of Kotromanić
- List of Bosnian rulers

== Sources ==
- Isailović, Neven (2012). "Повеља бана Пријезде I" (PDF). GPB. 5. ANURS: 9–25.
- Komatina, Ivana (2016). Crkva i država u srpskim zemljama od XI do XIII veka [Church and State in the Serbian Lands from the XIth to the XIIIth Century]. Istorijski institut. ISBN 978-86-7743-113-6.
- Krstić, Aleksandar R. (2016). "The Rival and the Vassal of Charles Robert of Anjou: King Vladislav II Nemanjić". Banatica. 26 (2): 33–51.
- Mrgić, Jelena (2008). Živković, Tibor (ed.). Северна Босна: 13-16. век. Историјски институт. ISBN 9788677430719.
- Mrgić Radojčić, Jelena (2002). Доњи Краји. Belgrade: Filozofski fakultet. ISBN 978-86-80269-59-7.
- Solovjev, A. (1949). "Властеоске повеље босанских владара". Историско-правни зборник. 1.

Preceded by Matej Ninoslav	Ban of Bosnia; 1250–1287	Succeeded by Prijezda II and Stephen I Kotromanić
