= Bilino Polje abjuration =

1203 renunciation of heresy by Bosnian Church clergy at Bilino Polje

- Native name: Bilinopoljska izjava
- Date: April 8, 1203
- Time: Middle Ages
- Venue: Bilino Polje
- Location: Banate of Bosnia, present-day Zenica, Bosnia and Herzegovina; 44°12′20.7″N 17°54′25.5″E
- Also known as: Confessio Christianorum bosniensis
- Type: synod
- Target: Bosnian Church
- Patrons: Inocent III and Emeric, King of Hungary
- Organised by: Giovanni da Casamari
- Participants: Giovanni da Casamari, Ban Kulin, Dragić Ljubiša and Dražeta
- Outcome: signed abjuration
- Arrests: no
- Suspects: Bosnian Church hierarchy
- Convicted: no
- Charges: heresy

Bilino Polje abjuration, also known as “Confessio Christianorum bosniensis”, was an act of heresy abjuration by Bosnian clergy in presence of Ban Kulin and Giovanni da Casamari. It was signed by seven priors of the Bosnian Church, on 8 April 1203 at Bilino Polje field, near today town of Zenica, in Bosnia and Herzegovina. The same document was brought to Buda, in 30 April by Giovanni da Casamari, Ban Kulin and two abbots, where it was examined by Emeric, King of Hungary, and the high clergy.

== Background ==
Vukan Nemanjić, Serbian Great Prince and ruler of Dioclea, wrote to Pope Innocent III in 1199 that Kulin, Bosnian ruler, had become a heretic, along with his wife, sister, other relatives, and 10,000 other Bosnians. The Archbishop of Spalato, vying for control over Bosnia, joined Vukan and accused the Archbishop of Ragusa of neglecting his suffragan diocese in Bosnia. Emeric, King of Hungary and supporter of Spalato, also seized this opportunity to try to extend his influence over Bosnia. More accusations against Kulin, such as harbouring heretics, ensued until 1202.

In 1203, Ban Kulin moved to defuse the serious threat of foreign intervention. Fearing that Emeric might undertake a full-blown crusade against his country, Kulin decided to summon a synod of the Bosnian Church at Bilino Polje. A synod was held at his instigation on 6 April 1203. where the hierarchy of the Bosnian Church acknowledged papal primacy and ordered the reform of its rites.

Following the abjuration of Bilino Polje, Kulin succeeded in keeping the Bosnian Diocese under the Ragusan Archdiocese, thus limiting Hungarian influence. The errors abjured by the Bosnians in Bilino Polje seem to have been errors of practice, stemming from ignorance, rather than heretical doctrines.

== Development ==
The “Confessio Christianorum bosniensis” ended with a signing at Bilino Polje by seven priors of the Bosnian Church in this field, on 8 April 1203. The same document was brought to Buda, in 30 April by Giovanni da Casamari and Kulin and two abbots, where it was examined by Emeric, King of Hungary, and the high clergy. Confessio records that a group of Bogomil leaders renounced patareni's teachings before Innocent III's court chaplain John of Casamaris (Giovanni da Casamari). Bosnian krstjani's presence in the Zenica area and its status as a seat of the Bosnian Church is supported by written documents, but also by engravings which illuminate the church's hierarchy.

On the surface, the “Confessio” concerned church organization and practices. The monks renounced their schism with Rome and agreed to accept Rome as the mother church. They promised to erect chapels with altars and crucifixes, where they would have priests who would say Mass and dispense Holy Communion at least seven times a year on the main feast days.

The priests would also hear confession and give penances. The monks promised to chant the hours, night and day, and to read the Old Testament as well as the New. They would follow the Church's schedule of fasts, as well as their own regimen. They also agreed to stop calling themselves krstjani—which had been their exclusive privilege—lest they cause pain to other Christians. They would wear special, uncolored robes, closed and reaching the ankles. In addition they were to have graveyards next to the church, where they would bury their brethren and any visitors who happened to die there.

Women members of the order were to have special quarters away from the men and to eat separately; nor could they be seen talking alone with a monk, lest they cause scandal. The abbots also agreed not to offer lodging to manicheans or other heretics. Finally, upon the death of the head of their order (magister), the abbots, after consultation with their fellow monks, would submit their choice to the Pope for his approval. As for the Bosnian Catholic diocese itself, John advised Innocent that they needed to break the hold of the Slavonic bishop who had ruled the Bosnian church up to then, and to appoint three or four Latin bishops, since Bosnia was a large country (“ten days’ walk”).

After the “Confessio” was approved by King Emmerich, John de Casamaris, in a letter to Innocent, refers to “the former Patarenes.”(23) Obviously, he thought that he had converted the krstjani, but he was wrong. Partly due to Rome's complacency (caused by Casamaris's feelings of success) and the Pope's failure to appoint Latin bishops, as John had suggested, the heretical movement grew stronger over the next few decades, uniting with remnants of the old native Catholic church. Together they formed a national, heretical church which survived crusades and threats of crusades until the mid-fifteenth century, when it gradually vanished in the face of the Ottoman takeover.

== Bosnian Crusade ==
Several crusades were called against Bosnia, a country long deemed infested with heresy by both the rest of Catholic Europe and its Eastern Orthodox neighbours. The first crusade was averted in April 1203, when Bosnians under Ban Kulin promised to practice Christianity according to the Roman Catholic rite and recognized the spiritual supremacy of the bishop of Rome (pope). Kulin also reaffirmed the secular supremacy of the kings of Hungary over Bosnia. In effect, however, the independence of both the Bosnian Church and Banate of Bosnia continued to grow.

The Bosnian Crusade was fought against unspecified heretics from 1235 until 1241. It was, essentially, a Hungarian war of conquest against the Banate of Bosnia sanctioned as a crusade. Led by the Hungarian prince Coloman, the crusaders succeeded in conquering only peripheral parts of the country. They were followed by Dominicans, who erected a cathedral and put heretics to death by burning. The crusade came to an abrupt end when Hungary itself was invaded by the Mongols during the Mongol invasion of Europe. The crusaders were forced to withdraw and engage their own invaders, most of them perishing, including Coloman. Later popes called for more crusades against Bosnia, but none ever took place. The failed crusade led to mistrust and hatred for Hungarians among the Bosnian population that lasted for centuries.

== See also ==
- Religious persecution

== Sources ==
- Curta, Florin (2006). Southeastern Europe in the Middle Ages, 500–1250. Cambridge University Press. ISBN 978-0-521-89452-4.
- Fine, John Van Antwerp Jr. (1994) [1987]. The Late Medieval Balkans: A Critical Survey from the Late Twelfth Century to the Ottoman Conquest. Michigan: University of Michigan Press. ISBN 0-472-08260-4.
- Fine, John Van Antwerp Jr. (1975). "The Bosnian Church: A New Interpretation. A Study of the Bosnian Church and its Place in State and Society From the 13th to the 15th Centuries". East European Quarterly. East European Monographs. 10. New York and London: Columbia University Press. ISBN 0-914710-03-6 – via Internet Archive.
- Lambert, Malcolm D. (1977). Medieval heresy: popular movements from Bogomil to Hus. Holmes & Meier Publishers.
- Stoianovich, Traian (2015). Balkan Worlds: The First and Last Europe. London: Routledge. ISBN 978-1-317-47615-3.
