= Stephen Tvrtko =

Stephen Tvrtko (also Stjepan Tvrtko or Stefan Tvrtko) may refer to:

- Stephen Tvrtko I, ruler of medieval Bosnia (1353–1366 and again 1367–1391)
- Stephen Tvrtko II, ruler of medieval Bosnia (1404–1409 and again 1421–1443)

== See also ==
- Tvrtko (disambiguation)
- Tvrtko of Bosnia (disambiguation)
- Tvrtko Kotromanić (disambiguation)
- List of rulers of Bosnia
