= Prijezda Kotromanić =

Prijezda Kotromanić may refer to:

- Prijezda I Kotromanić, medieval ruler (ban) of Bosnia (1250–1287)
- Prijezda II Kotromanić, medieval ruler (ban) of Bosnia (1287-1290)

== See also ==
- Stephen Kotromanić (disambiguation)
- Tvrtko Kotromanić (disambiguation)
- List of rulers of Bosnia
