= Stephen Kulinić =

Ban of Bosnia

Stephen

Ban of Bosnia
- Reign: first half of 13th c.
- Born: Bosnia
- Died: first half of 13th c. Bosnia
- Spouse: banica Ancila
- Issue: Sebislav
- House: Kulinić
- Religion: Catholicism

Territory ruled by the House of Kulinić

Stephen or Stjepan Ban of Bosnia, was the third Bosnian ban who ruled the banate of Bosnia recorded by name in written sources. He was in power sometime between 1204 and 1232. His rule was not popular, due to his Catholicism and allegiance to the Kingdom of Hungary. He was the last ruler of the House of Kulinić.

He is often called Serbo-Croatian: Stjepan Kulinić / Стјепан Кулинић in local sources (Stephen son of Kulin), and sometimes Stephen Kulinić in English There are no contemporary sources calling him by this patronymic, however.

== Reign ==
=== Lack of sources ===
It is not clear from the sources when exactly did Stjepan reign, between April 1203 and May 1233, when Matej Ninoslav became ban of Bosnia.

Stjepan is often considered the son of Ban Kulin and his wife, the banica Vojslava, and it is said that he actively participated in the events related to the papal investigation of the religion of Kulin and Vojslava. This cannot be proven with written sources, nor can it be completely rejected. There is no source that says that Kulin was succeeded by his son Stepan I, or by someone who usurped power from Kulin's son.

It is not even clear whether there was only one ruler between ban Kulin, who was alive in April 1203, and the "great ban" Ninoslav who ruled around 1232. From the papal correspondence, we learn a little that in 1236 Sebislav was the Knez of Usora, and that he was the son of the deceased Stjepan ban of Bosnia ("Zibisclao, Kenesio de Woscura (Vsora) nato quondam Stephani Bani de Bosna").

Despite the lively diplomatic activity of Pope Gregory IX after 1227 against those that he deemed as heretics in Bosnia, there is no mention of ban Stjepan in contemporary documents of the Roman Catholic Church.

=== Hungarian crusades ===
Despite the Bilino Polje abjuration of 1203, the Catholic Church remained suspicious of the orthodoxy of the Bosnian Christians. A mission was sent to convert Bosnia in 1216 but failed. The Crown of Hungary, of which Bosnia was formally a vassalage, and which followed Roman Catholicism, was equally wary of the Church of Bosnia because of its political influence in the country. Stjepan's Bosnia was thus characterized as being half-Barbaric.

At the height of the Albigensian Crusade against French Cathars in the 1220s, a rumour broke out that a "Cathar antipope", called Nicetas, was residing in Bosnia. It has never been clear whether Nicetas existed, but the neighboring Hungarians took advantage of the spreading rumour to reclaim suzerainty over Bosnia, which had been growing increasingly independent. Bosnians were accused of being sympathetic to Bogomilism, a Christian sect closely related to Catharism and likewise dualist.

In 1221, Pope Honorius III dispatched his legate, Aconcius, to Bosnia, to determinate the status of the Bosnian heresy. Aconcius claimed that the Bogumils spread Bogumilism over there just as younglings are being breast-fed. The Pope complained to King Andrew II of Hungary and the Hungarian Bishoprics to destroy the Bosnian Bogomils, calling for a crusade against Bosnia. King Andrew was fighting inner conflicts, so he could not heed the Papacy's callings. The Roman Catholic Archbishop of Kalocsa wanted to lead the Crusade against Bosnia if the Pope promised that Bosnia would be ecclesiastically subjected to him; and so the Pope asked him to keep his promise in 1225. That year, by Pope's edict, Bosnia, Soli and Usora were transferred from the coastal Dalmatian bishoprics to the suzerainty of Ugrin Csák, Archbishop of Kalocsa. The Archbishop negotiated with the ruler of Srem to launch a joint operation in Bosnia. The Archbishop dispatched John Angelos of Syrmia, a Byzantine prince and nephew of the Hungarian King, to lead a military attempt into Bosnia.

On 15 May 1225, Pope Honorius III spurred the Hungarians to undertake the Bosnian Crusade. That expedition, like the previous ones, turned into a defeat, and the Hungarians had to retreat when the Mongols invaded their territories.

During the reign of Stjepan, the grasp of the Bosnian Church had grown further. Pope Gregory IX, elected in 1227, decided to launch a Crusade against the Bosnian Church in order to finally eradicate it. As part of that plan, he launched a very lively diplomatic activity. During all that time, there is no mention of ban Stjepan in local documents, and the Vatican does not mention him either.

=== Deposition ===
Because of his ardent Roman Catholicism and his allegiance to the Hungarian Kingdom, Stjepan was not popular among his Bosnian subjects. Towards the end of his reign, the Inquisition came to Bosnia and burned several dozen heretics in Vitez for ten years.. In 1232, when a disorder caught Hungary, the Bosnians revolted and deposed ban Stjepan. His throne was seized by Matej Ninoslav.

Ban Stjepan and his wife, banica Ancila, had a son, Sibislav.

== See also ==
- History of Bosnia and Herzegovina
- List of rulers of medieval Bosnia

== Bibliography ==
- Логос, Александар А. (2017). Историја Срба I. Београд. ISBN 978-86-85117-37-4.
- Анчић, Младен (2005). Касносредњовековни Столац, Повијесни прилози 29.
- Ћирковић, Сима (1964). Историја средњовековне босанске државе. Београд: Српска књижевна задруга.
- Накаш, Лејла (2011). Конкордацијски рјечник ћирилских повеља средњовјековне Босне. Сарајево.
- Fejér, Georgius (1829a). Codex diplomaticus Hungariae ecclesiasticus ac civilis, Tomi IV, Vol. 1. Budae.
- Fejér, Georgius (1829b). Codex diplomaticus Hungariae ecclesiasticus ac civilis, Tomi II. Budae.
- Логос, Александар А. (2016). Историја Срба, 2. измењено издање. Београд. ISBN 978-86-85117-31-2.

Preceded by Kulin	Bosnian Ban; 1204–1232	Succeeded by Matej Ninoslav
