= Stephen Kotromanić =

Stephen Kotromanić (also Stjepan Kotromanić, or Stefan Kotromanić) may refer to:

- Stephen I Kotromanić, ban (ruler) of medieval Bosnia (1287–1314)
- Stephen II Kotromanić, ban (ruler) of medieval Bosnia (1322–1353)

== See also ==
- Tvrtko Kotromanić (disambiguation)
- Prijezda Kotromanić (disambiguation)
- List of rulers of Bosnia
