= Tvrtko of Bosnia =

Tvrtko of Bosnia may refer to:

- Tvrtko I of Bosnia, medieval ban, and king of Bosnia (1353-1366 and 1367-1391)
- Tvrtko II of Bosnia, medieval king of Bosnia (1404–1409 and again 1421–1443)

== See also ==
- Tvrtko (disambiguation)
- Tvrtko Kotromanić (disambiguation)
- List of rulers of Bosnia
