= Matej Ninoslav =

Ban of Bosnia, 1232–1250

- Ban (duke) of Bosnia
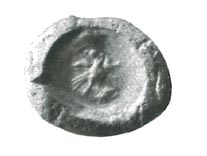
- His seal, dated 1240
- Predecessor: Stjepan Kulinić
- Successor: Prijezda I
- Born: Bosnia
- Father: Radivoje
- Occupation: Vassal of the Kingdom of Hungary

Matej Ninoslav (Serbian Cyrillic: Матеј Нинослав; died 1250) was the Ban of Bosnia in the period of 1232–50. Most of Bosnia was under the Kingdom of Hungary from 1235 to 1241. Ninoslav was also a Prince of Split in 1242–1244 during the local civil war. Ninoslav established control of most of Bosnia after the Hungarian withdrawal. Ninoslav continually defended Bosnia during the Bosnian Crusade that persecuted its heretic population. He was succeeded by his cousin, Ban Prijezda, in 1254.

== Biography ==
=== Early rule ===
Before his rule, early in his life, Ninoslav was an opposer of the Bosnian Church, a faithful Hungarian supporter and a pious Catholic Christian. Entering his rule, Matej Ninoslav forcibly replaced his predecessor, Stjepan Kulinić with the help of the adherents of the Bosnian Church, which caused good relations with Serbia to sour.

During his rule, Ninoslav served as a faithful Hungarian vassal, but was greatly underestimated during his reign. The Prenestine Bishop James, serving as the Pope's legate, finished a business in Hungary and came to Bosnia to influence Matej Ninoslav to give a statement that he will remain a Catholic, even though his ancestors were adherents of the Bosnian Church. The Roman Pope wrote a letter to Matej Ninoslav thus on 10 October 1233, guaranteeing his integrity and putting him under his protectorate:

Hugging you with true love, your person and your land of Bosnia. We accept under the protection of Saint Peter and Us with all the lands, that you rightfully hold, and We stand by you through the protection of this letter, as long as you remain in Catholic religion...

The letter also bears a mention of his Krstjanin cousin, Prijezda, who now returned to his old religion by converting to Catholicism. This was insufficient to the Pope's emissaries - so Prijezda had to give his son hostage as a guarantee. Ban Ninoslav himself had to beg to Rome itself for the release of Prijezda's son.

In 1234, King Andrew II of Hungary gifted Ninoslav's title to Herzeg Coloman, who passed on the title on to Matej's cousin, Prijezda during the crusades between 1234 and 1239, weakening Matej's position as Ban. At the same time, the son of former Bosnia's Ban Stjepan, Prince Sibislav of Usora began to intrude on Ninoslav's territory with his forces, trying to return the title of Ban to the House of Kulinić. To make matters worse; the Pope was unsatisfied with the Krstjani in Bosnia; so he replaced the old, presumably strayed Bosnian Bishop, in 1233, with a German member of the Dominican Order Johannes Wildeshausen. Wildeshausen was not welcomed in Bosnia since its population did not want an extremely zealous German for their ecclesiastical leader. The Pope's emissaries to Bosnia become more frequent as the situation becomes more tense. It led to Pope Gregory IX calling for a Crusade on Bosnia on 17 October 1234. This proclamation was given in Rome the same significance of the Crusades for the Holy Land. On 9 August 1235, the Pope also confirmed King Andrew's proclamation of Croatia's Herzog Coloman as the legitimate Ban of Bosnia.

=== Edicts to Dubrovnik ===
Some time between 1232 and 1235, Matej issued an edict to the Republic of Ragusa, guaranteeing the old privileges given to Ragusa by Ban Kulin long ago. It dealt with commercial privileges and states that for deceit by a Vlach over a Serb, a Bosnian court was to be conveyed. But for deceit of a Serb over a Vlach, a court was to be convened in Ragusa (Dubrovnik). Ninoslav reissued the edict to Ragusa on 22 March 1240, but expanded it to include a protectorate guaranteeing the independence of Ragusa in case of an attack by Serbian King Stefan Vladislav. The latter was reissued in March 1249 during the reign of King Stefan Uroš I. In all three of them the terms Serbs (Srblji) for Bosnians and Vlachs (Vlasi) for Ragusans were used, however such terminology was never used beforehand or afterwards for the Bosnians, nor of Vlachs for Ragusans by the Bosnians. Mirošević (1997) considered that the terminology was brought from Serbian documents via the Dubrovnik office (first written by notary Desoje, and two others by notary Paskal who previously copied a document by Stefan the First-Crowned of Serbia).

=== Late rule and the Crusades ===
The Hungarians amassed an immense Crusader Force. The Bosnians did not want to give up their religion for another, under Hungarian sword, so they organized resistance. Soon the Crusaders, led by Croatia's Herzog Coloman, stormed Bosnia. As Ban Matej did not have the strength to oppose, he retreated to the impassable mountains and primeval forests. The war lasted for almost five years and was exhausting for both sides as can be seen in the fact that Bishop Wildeshausen begged the Pope to relieve him from his duty. Ninoslav put up a staunch defense. Prince Sibislav of Usora joined the fight against Ninoslav soon. Many of the Bosnian noblemen under Sibislav crossed to the Hungarian side, while others were simply too afraid to act. On 26 April 1238, it seemed that Coloman had destroyed the heretic strength in Bosnia, reporting to the Pope that Bosnia had been cleansed. On 23 December 1238, Coloman continued to amass victories against the heretic side. Although the Crusaders managed to freely overrun the Western Areas and the Hum they could never get a permanent hold of Bosnia proper. In 1237, deemed incapable, Bishop Wildeshausen was replaced by the Pope with a Hungarian Dominican, who conducted terror by burning the Bogomils on stakes. Matej had to retreat to Dubrovnik in 1240, after the numerous crusaders overran his realm.

In 1241, the Tartars invaded Hungary and killed Duke Coloman at the battle of Mohi at the river of Sajó. King Bela IV was on the retreat which enabled Ninoslav to restore control over most of Bosnia. The Bosnian Church prevailed and would continue to play an integral role in the inner politics of Bosnian society until the Ottoman conquest.

=== Split-Trogir conflict ===
In retaliation, Ninoslav punished the Pope's supporters throughout Bosnia after he restored control. His cousin, Prijezda, fled to Hungary. Ninoslav also intervened in the civil war in Croatia between the loyalist city of Trogir and rebelling Split as he was looking to gain more of Split's possessions. He sided with Split which rebelled against King Bela IV and elected Ninoslav as its new Prince. The Split assault on the City of Trogir failed, but the city's surroundings were devastated. In 1244, King Bela sent one of his two armies on Bosnia against Ninoslav. Ninoslav lost Split, as the Hungarian Army, under Slavonia's Ban Dionisus, together with the forces of Trogir took the city in the summer of 1244. A peace treaty was signed on July 19, 1244. The amnesty itself excluded Split's allies, presented by Ninoslav. The other army was led by King Bela and breached to the city of Glaško in Bosnia. Bosnia was not harmed itself by the King's military campaign and a peace was signed on 20 July 1244 with Ban Ninoslav and his brothers and nobility, that confirmed the rights and lands of the Bosnian Church. Bela's negotiations lasted in Glaško from 15th to 21 July. Matej Ninoslav had to only nominally recognize Hungarian rule and kept his possessions abroad, in Slavonia. He also had to grant numerous lands in Bosnia itself, recognizing and keeping the organization and infrastructure of the Catholic Church.

=== Proposed Crusade against Ninoslav ===
The Bosnian heresy remained strong, so King Bela IV and the Roman Catholic Archbishop requested that Pope Innocent IV launch a new Crusade against Ninoslav in 1247. The situation grew very dangerous, so Ninoslav wrote to the new Pope that he always remained a staunch Catholic Christian, and never a heretic. This was confirmed by the Pope's delegates that visited Bosnia shortly thereafter. The Pope wrote to the Catholic Archbishop in 1248 stating that he found Ninoslav to be a noble man and loyal to the Catholic faith, despite the sympathy he received infidels against his old enemies, and asked the Archbishop not to rise up against the Ban.

The remainder of his reign, Ban Ninoslav Matej dealt with inner matters in Bosnia. His death after 1249, possibly in 1250, brought some conflicts over the throne; as the Bosnian Church desired someone from their own sphere of interest, and the Hungarians side desired someone that they could easily control. Eventually, King Bela IV conquered and pacified Bosnia and succeed in putting Ninoslav's Catholic cousin Prijezda as the Bosnian Ban. The Bosnian Bishop was expelled to Djakovo in Slavonia and never returned to Bosnia, with the Roman Catholic Church permanently losing all greater foundations in Bosnia.

== See also ==
- List of Bosnian rulers
- History of Bosnia and Herzegovina

== Annotations ==
- Name: His name is mostly spelled Matej Ninoslav (Матеј Нинослав), and also Matija Ninoslav.

| Preceded by Stjepan Kulinić | Ban of Bosnia; 1232–1250 | Succeeded by Prijezda I |
| Preceded by unknown | Prince of Split; 1242 – 19 July 1244 | Succeeded by unknown |
