= Stephen Praska =

Ban of Croatia in the 11th century

Ban of Croatia
- In office c. 1035 – c. 1058
- Monarch: Stephen I (1030–1058)
- Preceded by: Božeteh
- Succeeded by: Gojčo

Personal details
- Spouse: Mary

Stephen Praska (Croatian: Stjepan Praska) was Ban of Croatia under King Stephen I. According to the chronicle of Archdeacon Goricensis John, he was established by king Stephen I around 1035 (after his military expeditions to the east), thus succeeding Božeteh as Croatian ban. He eventually attained an imperial title of protospatharios somewhere between 1035 and 1042, which governed his influence over the Byzantine Dalmatian theme. Prasca is known to have granted land to the monastery of Crisogni with his wife, Mary, which is attested in a 1042 document. He resided in Zadar.

Preceded by Božeteh	Ban of Croatia; 1035–1058	Succeeded by Gojčo
