= Godemir, Ban of Croatia =

Croatian ban (10th century)

Godemir

Ban of Croatia
- In office c. 969 – c. 997
- Monarchs: Michael Krešimir II (949–969); Stephen Držislav (969–997)
- Preceded by: Pribina
- Succeeded by: Gvarda

Godemir or Godimir (fl. 970 – 1000/1030) was Ban of Croatia during 10th century Croatia. He is said to have served the king Stephen Držislav in a charter from 1068. According to the much debated Chronicle of Archdeacon Goricensis John, he was established to his position by a certain King Krešimir (though it is unclear whether the chronicler mixes two different rulers). He is also referred to in a charter as potens banus, meaning "powerful ban".

Additionally, he is mentioned in another charter, dated 1028, which is a grant to the monastery of St. Krševan by his sister Helenica.

Preceded by Pribina	Ban of Croatia fl. c. 969 – c. 997	Succeeded by Gvarda
