= Pribina, Ban of Croatia =

Croatian nobleman and politician

Pribina

Ban of Croatia
- In office c. 949 – 969
- Monarchs: Miroslav (945–949); Michael Krešimir II (949–969)
- Preceded by: unknown
- Succeeded by: Godimir

Pribina was a Croatian nobleman and politician who is the first historically attested Ban of Croatia, having served under kings Miroslav and Michael Krešimir II of Croatia. Pribina is known to have killed king Miroslav during a civil war in the kingdom and replaced him with Michael Krešimir II because the former had restrained his jurisdiction over some areas. He ruled over counties (županija) Gacka, Krbava and Lika, according to De Administrando Imperio. He is also referred to in a charter as potens banus, meaning "powerful ban".

According to historian Tibor Živković, implying different chronological order of Croatian dukes and kings, Pribina should be identified with the same-named Duke of Lower Pannonia, Pribina, while Frankish archon Kotzil with Duke's son Kocel, both mentioned in De Administrando Imperio regarding the deposition of Miroslav in 861 and armed revolt by the Croats who were led by their Duke Domagoj in which "managed to prevail and killed all the Franks and their archon, called Kotzil" in 874.

Preceded by unknown	Ban of Croatia fl. 930 - 969	Succeeded by Godimir
