= Gojčo =

Ban of Croatia in the 11th century

Gojslav

Ban of Croatia
- In office c. 1060 – 1070
- Monarch: Peter Krešimir IV
- Preceded by: Stephen Praska
- Succeeded by: Demetrius Zvonimir

Gojčo was the Ban of Croatia from c.1060 to c.1070. He succeeded Stjepan Praska as ban. He is mentioned in royal charters from 1060-1062 and probably is one of unmentioned ban's in royal charter of 1069.

Some historians identified him to the brother of king Peter Krešimir IV of Croatia, who was rumored to have murdered his brother Gojslav, but other historians reject such identification.

He was succeeded by Zvonimir, who also later became king.

== Bibliography ==
- Brković, Milko. "Svjedoci u ispravama hrvatskih narodnih vladara"

Preceded by Stephen Praska	Ban of Croatia fl. c. 1060 – c. 1070	Succeeded by Demetrius Zvonimir
