= Knez =

Knez may refer to:

- Knez (title), equivalent of "duke" or "prince", used in medieval Slavic countries such as Croatia, Serbia and Slovenia
- Knez (Vlach leader), a leader of the Vlach (or Romanian) communities in the medieval Kingdom of Hungary.
- Knez (surname), a South Slavic surname
- Knez (singer), the stage name of Montenegrin singer Nenad Knežević

KNEZ may refer to:

- KNEZ (FM), a radio station (107.3 FM) licensed to serve Hazen, Nevada, United States
- KETF-CD, a low-power television station (channel 27, virtual 39) licensed to serve Laredo, Texas, United States, which held the call sign KNEZ-LP from 1999 to 2007
