= Tvrtko Kotromanić =

Tvrtko of Bosnia may refer to:

- Tvrtko I Kotromanić, medieval ruler of Bosnia (1353–1366 and again 1367–1391)
- Tvrtko II Kotromanić, medieval ruler of Bosnia (1404–1409 and again 1421–1443)

== See also ==
- Tvrtko (disambiguation)
- Tvrtko of Bosnia (disambiguation)
- Stephen Kotromanić (disambiguation)
- Prijezda Kotromanić (disambiguation)
- List of rulers of Bosnia
