= Bosnian Crusade =

Crusade fought against heretics in Bosnia

- Part of the Crusades
Date	1235–1241
Location	Bosnia, possibly also Slavonia and Zachlumia
Result	Bosnian victory: Hungarian Invasion repelled
Territorial changes	Hungarian occupation of peripheral parts of Bosnia reversed after the war

Belligerents
Kingdom of Hungary	Banate of Bosnia

Commanders and leaders
Coloman of Hungary	Matej Ninoslav

The Bosnian Crusade was fought against unspecified heretics from 1235 to 1241 and was essentially a Hungarian war of conquest against the Banate of Bosnia that was sanctioned as a crusade. Led by a Hungarian prince, Coloman, the crusaders succeeded in conquering only peripheral parts of the country. They were followed by Dominicans, who erected a cathedral and put some heretics to death by burning.

The crusade came to an abrupt end when Hungary itself was invaded by the Mongols during the Mongol invasion of Europe. The crusaders were forced to withdraw and to engage their own invaders, with most of them perishing including Coloman. Later Popes called for more crusades against Bosnia, but none ever took place. The failed crusade led to mistrust and hatred for Hungarians among the Bosnians that lasted for centuries.

== Background ==
Several crusades were called against Bosnia, a country that had long been deemed infested with heresy by both the rest of Catholic Europe and Orthodox Europe. The first crusade was averted in April 1203, when the Bosnians under Ban Kulin promised to practice Christianity according to the Roman Catholic rite and recognized the spiritual supremacy of the Pope. Kulin also reaffirmed the secular supremacy of the kings of Hungary over Bosnia. In effect, however, the independence of the Bosnian Church and the Banate of Bosnia continued to grow.

At the height of the Albigensian Crusade against the French Cathars in the 1220s, a rumour broke out that a "Cathar antipope", called Nicetas, resided in Bosnia. It has never been clear whether Nicetas existed, but neighbouring Hungary took advantage of the rumour to reclaim suzerainty over Bosnia, which had been growing increasingly independent. The Bosnians were accused of being sympathetic to Bogomilism, a Christian sect that was closely related to Catharism and likewise dualist. In 1221, the concern finally prompted Pope Honorius III to preach a crusade against Bosnia. He repeated this in 1225, but internal problems prevented the Hungarians from answering his call.

Honorius III's successor, Pope Gregory IX, accused the Catholic bishop of Bosnia himself of sheltering heretics, in addition to illiteracy, simony, ignorance of the baptismal formula and failure to celebrate Mass and the sacraments. He was duly deposed in 1233 and replaced with a German Dominican prelate, John of Wildeshausen, the first non-Bosnian bishop of Bosnia. The same year, Ban Matthew Ninoslav abandoned an unspecified heresy, but that did not satisfy Gregory.

== Conflict ==
In 1234, Pope Gregory IX issued another call for crusade, and this time, Hungary readily responded. It is possible that the Bosnians had failed to align their church with Rome, but the crusade actually served as a perfect excuse for the Hungarians to expand their authority. Gregory promised indulgences to prospective crusaders and entrusted Coloman, the younger son of Andrew II and brother of Béla IV, with executing the military action. Coloman and his followers were put under protection of the Holy See. Neither the enemies nor the targeted region were precisely named in the letters the Pope sent to Coloman and the Bishop of Bosnia. He referred to "Slavonia" and mentioned "lands of Bosnia" only in the letter to the Bishop. It is generally understood that by "Slavonia", he meant Bosnia and its surroundings, Slavic lands or even to actual Slavonia. The fact that the Bishop of Bosnia was informed, however, makes it clear that Bosnia itself was targeted. The action seems to have been taken against Bosnians in general as only "heretics" are mentioned; it is implied in one source that the crusade was directed against dualists.

Active fighting began in 1235, but the Hungarian Army reached Bosnia proper only three years later. The delay may have been caused by the popular resistance in the north of the country, Soli, where the mountainous terrain helped "many heretics" fight the crusaders. In August 1236, Pope Gregory ordered the crusaders not to pester Matthew Ninoslav's relative Sibislav, the knez of Usora, or his mother, who were both "good Catholics" among heretical nobles, "lilies among thorns". Vrhbosna apparently fell in 1238, when a cathedral was constructed by Dominicans, who followed the crusaders. The crusaders failed to conquer all of Bosnia, however, as Matthew Ninoslav continued to act as ban throughout the conflict in the central parts of his realm, where Dominicans never set foot. The order took control of the Catholic Church in Bosnia, which was now led by a new bishop, the Hungarian Ponsa. The Dominicans recorded that some heretics were burned at the stake but do not appear to have discovered anything about the nature of the heresy. The crusaders then either reached as far south as Zachlumia or intended to do so.

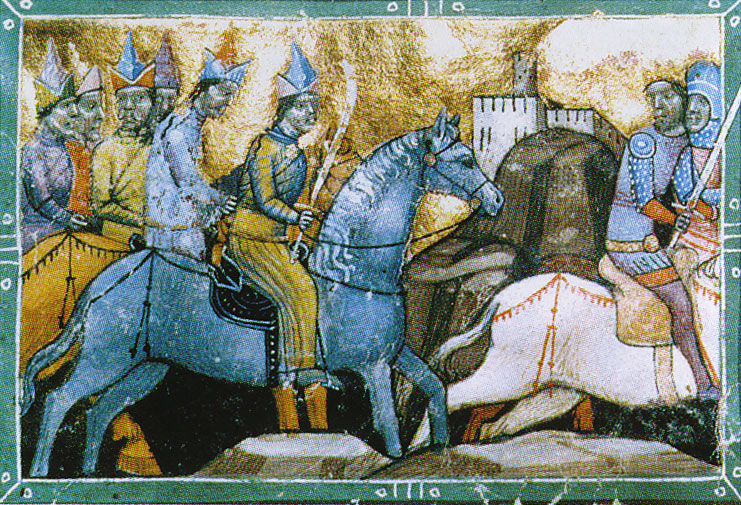
Hungarians fleeing Mongol invaders

Then, in 1241, the Mongol invasion of Europe saved Bosnia. The Mongols under Batu Khan, having subdued and devastated Kievan Rus', invaded Hungary. The Hungarian troops were forced to withdraw from Bosnia and face their own invaders. Much of their army was wiped out in the Battle of Mohi. Coloman, the commander of the crusaders, was among those killed. The Mongols plundered Dalmatia, Croatia, Zeta, Serbia and Bulgaria. Their attack proved disastrous for all of the Balkans but Bosnia. The crusaders were annihilated and never returned. Bosnia retook the occupied territories and maintained its level of independence following what turned out to be a Hungarian war of conquest that was sanctioned as a crusade.

== Aftermath and legacy ==
The threat of new religious persecution in Bosnia reappeared within a few years of the war. Pope Innocent IV began urging the Hungarians to undertake another crusade in late 1246 and 1247, and they appeared willing. Matthew Ninoslav argued that he had associated with heretics only to defend Bosnia from Hungarian invaders. He appears to have convinced Innocent, who suspended the crusade in March 1248.

A crusade against Bosnia was preached again in 1337–1338 and 1367 by Popes Benedict XII and Urban V, respectively, but in drastically different political circumstances. Hungary was ruled by a new dynasty, the Capetian Angevins, who supported the Kotromanić rulers of Bosnia. King Charles Robert once declared that any Hungarian who attacked Bosnia, ruled by his friend Stephen II, would be regarded as a traitor.

The only significant impact of the Bosnian Crusade was augmenting the anti-Hungarian sentiment among the Bosnians that greatly contributed to the Ottoman conquest of Bosnia in 1463 and lasted afterward.
