= Abjuration =

Repudiation, abandonment, or renunciation by or upon oath

Abjuration is the solemn repudiation, abandonment, or renunciation by or upon oath, often the renunciation of citizenship or some other right or privilege. The term comes from the Latin abjurare, "to forswear".

== Abjuration of the realm ==
Abjuration of the realm was a type of abjuration in ancient English law. The person taking the oath swore to leave the country directly and promptly, never to return to the kingdom unless by permission of the sovereign. This was often taken by fugitives who had taken sanctuary:

I swear on the Holy Book that I will leave the realm of England and never return without the express permission of my Lord the King or his heirs. I will hasten by the direct road to the port allotted to me and not leave the King's highway under pain of arrest or execution. I will not stay at one place more than one night and will seek diligently for a passage across the sea as soon as I arrive, delaying only one tide if possible. If I cannot secure such passage, I will walk into the sea up to my knees every day as a token of my desire to cross. And if I fail in all this, then peril shall be my lot.

== English Commonwealth ==
Near the start of the English Civil War, on 18 August 1643 Parliament passed "An Ordinance for Explanation of a former Ordinance for Sequestration of Delinquents Estates with some Enlargements". The enlargements included an oath which became known as the "Oath of Abjuration":

I ...; Do abjure and renounce the Pope's Supremacy and Authority over the Catholic Church in General, and over my self in Particular; And I do believe that there is not any Transubstantiation in the Sacrament of the Lords Supper, or in the Elements of Bread and Wine after Consecration thereof, by any Person whatsoever; And I do also believe, that there is not any Purgatory, Or that the consecrated Host, Crucifixes, or Images, ought to be worshipped, or that any worship is due unto any of them; And I also believe that Salvation cannot be Merited by Works, and all Doctrines in affirmation of the said Points; I do abjure and renounce, without any Equivocation, Mental Reservation, or secret Evasion whatsoever, taking the words by me spoken, according to the common and usual meaning of them. So help me God.

In 1656–57, it was reissued in what was for Catholics an even more objectionable form. Everyone was to be "adjudged a Papist" who refused this oath, and the consequent penalties began with the confiscation of two-thirds of the recusant's goods, and went on to deprive him of almost every civic right.

The Catholic Encyclopaedia makes the point that the oath and the penalties were so severe that it stopped the efforts of the Gallicanizing party among the English Catholics, who had been ready to offer forms of submission similar to the old oath of Allegiance, which was condemned anew about this time by Pope Innocent X.

== Scotland ==
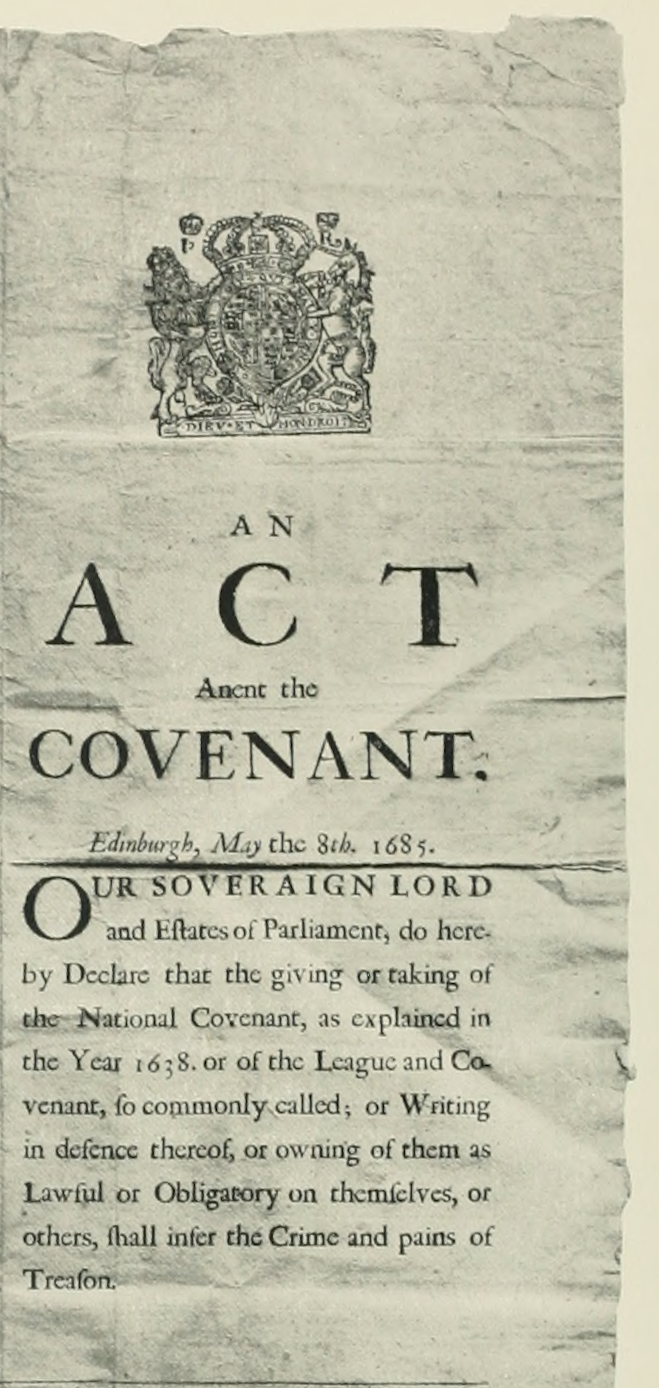
"An Act Anent [i.e. about] the Covenant", 8 May 1685. Following the union with England 22 years later, the Treason Act 1708 rendered this Act void as the English law of treason was extended to Scotland.

During the Killing Time of the 1680s, an Abjuration Oath could be put to suspects where they were given the option to abjure or renounce their allegiances. The terms of the oath were deliberately designed to offend the consciences of the Presbyterian Covenanters. Those who would not swear "whether they have arms, or not" could be "immediately killed" by field trial "before two witnesses" on a charge of high treason. John Brown was included among those executed in this judicial process by John Graham (Bluidy Clavers) on 1 May 1685. The wives and children of such men could also be put out of their houses if they had spoken to the suspect or refused the oath themselves.

== Great Britain and Ireland ==
In England (and after 1707 Great Britain) the Oath of Abjuration denied the royal title of James II's heirs (i.e. the direct Catholic descendant of the House of Stuart exiled after the Glorious Revolution in 1688). In England, an Oath of Abjuration was taken by Members of Parliament, clergy, and laymen, pledging to support the current British monarch and repudiated the right of the Stuarts and other claimants to the throne. This oath was imposed under William III, George I, and George III. It was superseded by the oath of allegiance. In Ireland, the oath was imposed of state officeholders, teachers, lawyers, and on the clergy of the established church in from 1703, the following year it was on all Irish voters and from 1709 it could be demanded of any adult male by a magistrate.

== Bilino Polje abjuration ==
The Bilino Polje abjuration, also known as "Confessio Christianorum bosniensis", was an act of alleged heresy abjuration by clergy of the Bosnian Church in presence of the Bosnian ruler, Ban Kulin, and Giovanni da Casamari. It affirmed the primacy of the pope and related to errors of practice, stemming from ignorance, rather than heretical doctrines. It was signed by seven Bosnian priors, on 8 April 1203 at Bilino Polje field, near today town of Zenica, in Bosnia and Herzegovina. The same document was brought to Buda, in 30 April by Giovanni da Casamari, Ban Kulin and two abbots, where it was examined by Emeric, King of Hungary, and the high clergy.

== The Netherlands ==
The Plakkaat van Verlatinghe (Spanish: Acta de Abjuración; English: Act of Abjuration) of 26 July 1581 was the formal declaration of independence of much of the Low Countries from the Spanish king, Philip II. This oath was one of the most important events of the Eighty Years' War (Dutch Revolt).

== See also ==
- English post-Reformation oaths
- Papists Act 1716
