= Tvrtko =

Tvrtko may refer to:

- Tvrtko I of Bosnia, medieval ban, and king of Bosnia (1353-1366 and 1367-1391)
- Tvrtko II of Bosnia, medieval king of Bosnia (1404–1409 and again 1421–1443)
- Tvrtko Jakovina (born 1972), Croatian historian
- Tvrtko Kale (born 1974), Croatian-Israeli footballer

== See also ==
- Tvrtko Kotromanić (disambiguation)
