= Soli (zemlja) =

Medieval region of Bosnia and Herzegovina

Coordinates: 44°33′37″N 18°41′50″E

Territorial development of Bosnia during the Middle Ages; with region of Soli indicated in northeastern parts of the country

Soli or Só was a zemlja of the medieval Bosnian state, located in today's northern Bosnia and Herzegovina, centered around the town of Tuzla. Initially, a Slavic župa, the County of Soli became an integral part of Kulin's Bosnia and later both of Banate of Bosnia and of the Kingdom of Bosnia.

Soli was also specially organized in the early feudal period. As such, it entered the title of Bosnian rulers, but somewhere in the first half of the 14th century it completely merged with Usora. Apart from the name and only the approximate territory, we know nothing about the organization of this zemlja.

The meaning of the name is "salts". With the arrival of the Ottoman Empire around 1512, the names of the villages "Gornje Soli" and "Donje Soli" were translated to "Memlehai-bala" and "Memlehai-zir", literally meaning Upper and Lower Saltworks, resp. Zemlja Soli would eventually be incorporated into zemlja Usora in 15th century.

== See also ==
- Donji Kraji

== Literature ==
- Anđelić, Pavao (1982). Studije o teritorijalnopolitičkoj organizaciji srednjovjekovne Bosne [Studies on the territorial-political organization of medieval Bosnia] (in Serbo-Croatian). Sarajevo: "Svjetlost," OOUR Izdavačka djelatnost. pp. 9–24. OCLC 1650228.
- Ćirković, Sima (2014) [1964]. "The Double Wreath: A Contribution to the History of Kingship in Bosnia". Balcanica (45): 107–143. doi:10.2298/BALC1445107C.
- Ćirković, Sima (2004). The Serbs. Malden: Blackwell Publishing. ISBN 978-1-4051-4291-5.
- Fine, John Van Antwerp Jr. (1991) [1983]. The Early Medieval Balkans: A Critical Survey from the Sixth to the Late Twelfth Century. Ann Arbor, Michigan: University of Michigan Press. ISBN 0-472-08149-7.
- Fine, John Van Antwerp Jr. (1994) [1987]. The Late Medieval Balkans: A Critical Survey from the Late Twelfth Century to the Ottoman Conquest. Ann Arbor, Michigan: University of Michigan Press. ISBN 0-472-08260-4.
- Moravcsik, Gyula, ed. (1967) [1949]. Constantine Porphyrogenitus: De Administrando Imperio (2nd revised ed.). Washington D.C.: Dumbarton Oaks Center for Byzantine Studies. ISBN 978-0-88402-021-9.
