= Prijezda II, Ban of Bosnia =

Ban of Bosnia

Prijezda II (Serbian Cyrillic: Пријезда II; Born 1242) was a Bosnian Ban in 1287–1290 alone, but later together with his possible brother Stephen I Kotroman as a vassal of the Hungarian Kingdom.

He was one of the sons of Ban Prijezda I. After his father's withdrawal from power in 1287, he split Bosnia with his brother, Stephen I Kotroman, taking control over western Bosnia. He died in 1290 and his lands were transferred to his brother Kotroman, who became the sole ruler of Bosnia proper.

== See also ==
- List of Bosnian rulers
- House of Kotromanić
- History of Bosnia and Herzegovina
- List of Bosnians

Preceded by Prijezda I	Bosnian Ban with Stephen I Kotromanić; 1287–1290	Succeeded by Stephen I Kotromanić
