= Bilino Polje =

Plain near Zenica, Bosnia and Herzegovina

- historic name Bolino polje
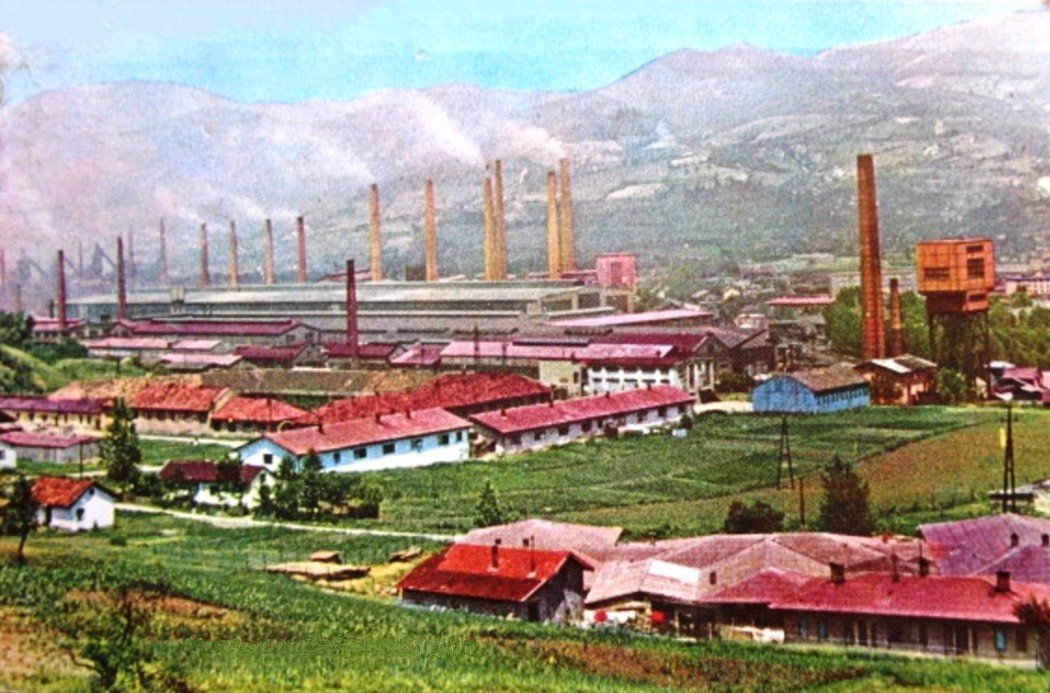
- Interactive map of Bilino Polje
- 44°12′20.7″N 17°54′25.5″E
- Type: karstic field (polje)
- Location: Bosnia and Herzegovina
- Nearest city: Zenica

History
- Formed: Cretaceous period

Site notes
- Elevation: 310 metres (1,020 ft)

Bilino Polje, is historic areal and polje, located near town of Zenica, in Bosnia and Hezegovina. Today, Bilino Polje represents an urban area of the town, and it is one of its main local communal self-governing units or Bosnian: Mjesna zajednica.

== Middle Ages ==
Among other Bosnian župas, Bored župa or Brod župa, which includes "Bilina poila", is mentioned in the charters. The place refers to one part of the town of Zenica, today known as Bilino Polje. The “Confessio” (abjuration) was signed at Bilino Polje by seven priors of the Bosnian Church in this field, on 8 April 1203. The same document was brought to Buda, in 30 April by Giovanni da Casamari and Kulin and two abbots, where it was examined by Emeric, King of Hungary, and the high clergy. Confessio records that a group of Bogomil leaders renounced patareni's teachings before Innocent III's court chaplain John of Casamaris (Giovanni da Casamari). Bosnian krstjani's presence in the Zenica area and its status as a seat of the Bosnian Church is supported by written documents, but also by engravings which illuminate the church's hierarchy.

== Modern times ==
Bilino Polje Stadium is the home football stadium of Bosnian Premier League football club NK Čelik from the city of Zenica in Bosnia and Herzegovina and one of two stadiums of the national football team of Bosnia and Herzegovina. It is also sometimes used for the Bosnia and Herzegovina national rugby union team as well.

== See also ==
- History of Bosnia and Herzegovina
