= Ban Kulin =

Kulin
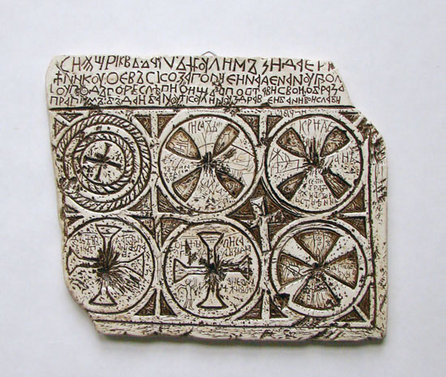

Ban of Bosnia
- Reign: 1180–1204
- Predecessor: Ban Borić
- Successor: Stephen Kulinić
- Born: Usora; Bosnia
- Died: c. November 1204; Bosnia
- Spouse: Vojislava
- Religion: Bosnian Church; Roman Catholicism (briefly)

Kulin's state in map of expansion of medieval Bosnia

Kulin (Serbo-Croatian Cyrillic: Кулин; d. c. November 1204) was the Ban of Bosnia from 1180 to 1204, and one of Bosnia's most prominent and notable historic rulers and had a great effect on the development of early Bosnian history. One of his most noteworthy diplomatic achievements is widely considered to have been the signing of the Charter of Ban Kulin, which encouraged trade and established peaceful relations between Dubrovnik and his realm of Bosnia. Kulin was the founder of the House of Kulinić. His son, Stephen Kulinić, succeeded him as Bosnian Ban.

== Early life ==
Kulin's sister was married to Miroslav of Hum, the brother of Serbian Grand Prince Stefan Nemanja (r. 1166–1196). He belonged to the Bosnian nobility and was brought to the throne when the Byzantine Emperor Manuel I Komnenos (1143–1180) was the overlord of Bosnia. In 1180, when Komnenos died, Stefan Nemanja and Kulin asserted independence of Serbia and Bosnia, respectively.

== Reign ==
His rule is often remembered as being emblematic of Bosnia's golden age, and he is a common hero of Bosnian national folk tales. Under him, the "Bosnian Age of Peace and Prosperity" would come to exist. Bosnia was completely autonomous and mostly at peace during his rule.

=== War against Byzantium ===
In 1183, Kulin Ban led his troops with the forces of the Kingdom of Hungary under King Béla and the Serbs under Stefan Nemanja, who had just launched an attack on the Byzantine Empire. The cause of the war was Hungary's non-recognition of the new emperor, Andronikos Komnenos. The united forces met little resistance in the eastern Serbian lands – the Byzantine squadrons were fighting among themselves as the local Byzantine commanders Alexios Brannes supported the new Emperor, while Andronikos Lapardes opposed him – and deserted the Imperial Army, going onto adventures on his own. Without difficulties, the Byzantines were pushed out of the Morava Valley and the allied forces breached all the way to Sofia, raiding Belgrade, Braničevo, Ravno, Niš and Sofia itself.

=== Heresy ===
In 1199, Serbian prince Vukan Nemanjić informed the Pope, Innocent, of heresy in Bosnia. Vukan claimed that Kulin, a heretic, had welcomed the heretics whom Bernard of Split had banished, and treated them as Christians. In 1200, the Pope wrote a letter to Kulin's suzerain, the Hungarian King Emeric, warning him that "no small number of Patarenes" had gone from Split and Trogir to Ban Kulin where they were warmly welcomed, and told him to "Go and ascertain the truth of these reports and if Kulin is unwilling to recant, drive him from your lands and confiscate his property". Kulin replied to the Pope that he did not regard the immigrants as heretics, but as Catholics, and that he was sending a few of them to Rome for examination, and also invited that a Papal representative be sent to investigate. Unconvinced, the Pope sent his legates to Bosnia to interrogate Kulin and his subjects about religion and life, and if indeed heretical, correct the situation through a prepared constitution. The Pope wrote to Bernard in 1202 that "a multitude of people in Bosnia are suspected of the damnable heresy of the Cathars." The two legates sent by the Pope went through the country of Bosnia and interrogated the clergy.

==== Bilino Polje abjuration ====
Not only did Casamaris listen to his informants' answers, but where they were in error, he would have taught them correct doctrine, in line with Innocent's directive. John must have convinced himself that he had fulfilled Innocent's command to correct the krstjani, because the "Confessio" (Abjuration) signed at Bilino Polje by seven priors of the Krstjani church on 8 April 1203, makes no mention of errors. The same document was brought to Budapest, 30 April by Casamaris and Kulin and two abbots, where it was examined by the Hungarian King and the high clergy. Kulin's son.

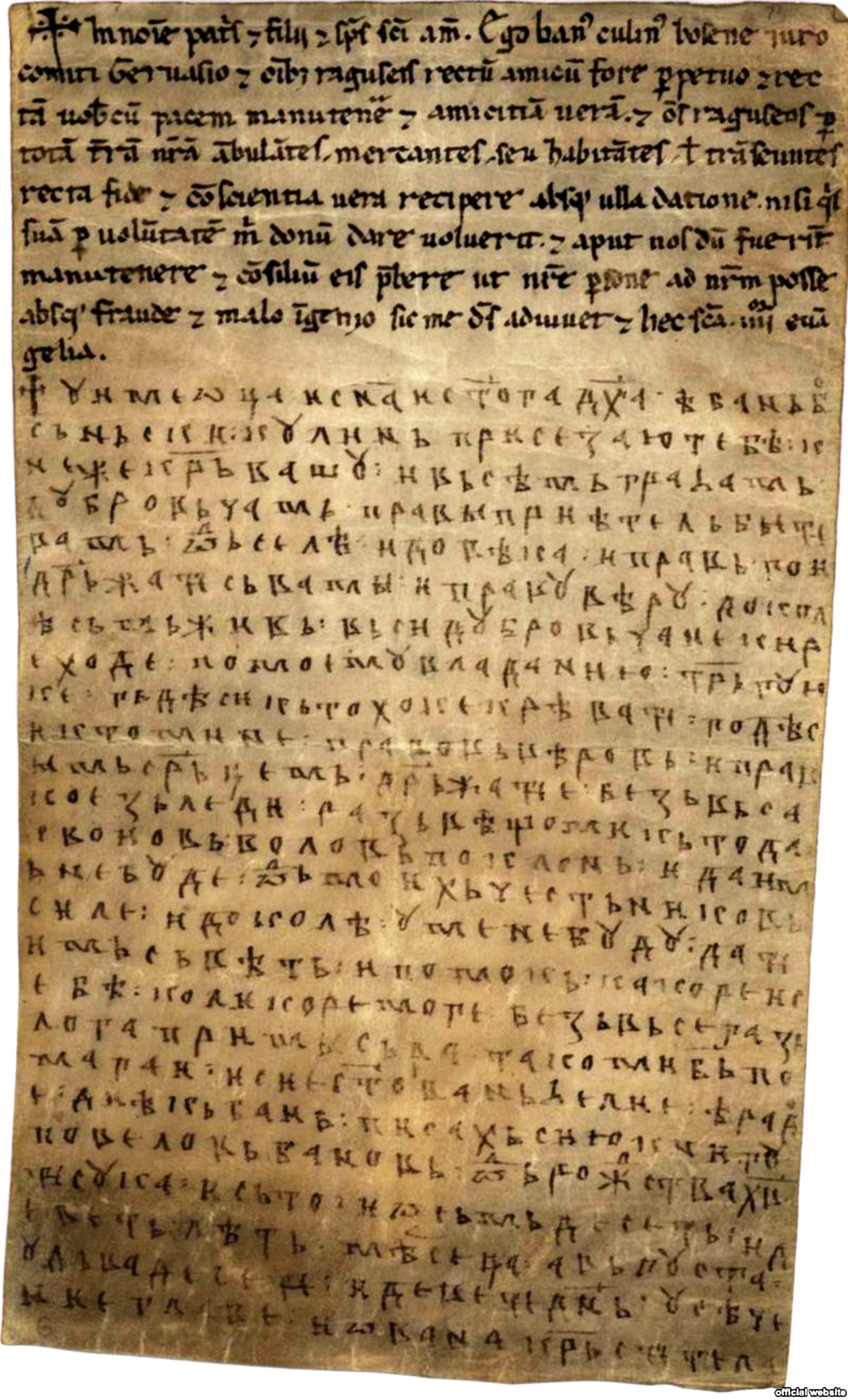
Copy B of the Charter of Ban Kulin.

=== Charter of Ban Kulin ===
The Charter of Ban Kulin was a trade agreement between Bosnia and the Republic of Ragusa that effectively regulated Ragusan trade rights in Bosnia written on 29 August 1189. It is one of the oldest written state documents in the Balkans and is among the oldest historical documents written in Bosnian Cyrillic. The charter is of great significance in national pride and historical heritage of Bosnia.

=== Death ===
After his death in 1204, Ban Kulin was succeeded to the Bosnian throne by Stjepan, ban of Bosnia, often deemed his son.

== Marriage and children ==
Kulin married Vojislava, with whom he had two sons:

- Stephen Kulinić, the following Ban of Bosnia
- A son that went with the Pope's emissaries in 1203 to explain heresy accusations against Kulin

== Legacy and folklore ==
Today Kulin's era is regarded as one of the most prosperous historical eras, not just for Bosnian medieval state and its feudal lords, but for the common people as well, whose lasting memory of those times is kept in Bosnian folklore, like an old folk proverb with significant meaning: "Od kulina Bana i dobrijeh dana" (English: Since Kulin Ban and those good old days).

Accordingly, in today's Bosnia and Herzegovina, many streets and town squares, as well as cultural institutions, and non-governmental organizations, bear Kulin's name, while numerous culturally significant events, manifestation, festivals and anniversaries are held in celebration of his life and deeds.

== See also ==
- Bosnia and Herzegovina in the Middle Ages
- List of rulers of Bosnia

| Preceded by Ban Borić | Bosnian Ban; 1180–1204 | Succeeded by Stjepan Kulinić |
