= Stjepan Vukčić Kosača =

15th-century Bosnian nobleman

Gospodin Stjepan Vukčić

Grand Duke of Bosnia
- Reign: 1435–1466
- Predecessor: Sandalj Hranić
- Successor: split Vlatko and Vladislav Hercegović
- Full name: Stjepan Vukčić Kosača
- Born: 1404; Goražde
- Died: 22 May 1466 (aged 61–62); Novi
- Residence: Blagaj, Soko, Novi, Ključ
- Wars and battles: Second Konavle War
- Noble family: Kosača
- Spouses: Jelena Balšić; Barbara; Cecilie
- Issue: Katarina, Queen of Bosnia; Vladislav Hercegović; Vlatko Hercegović; Hersekzade Ahmed Pasha
- Father: Vukac Hranić Kosača
- Mother: Katarina

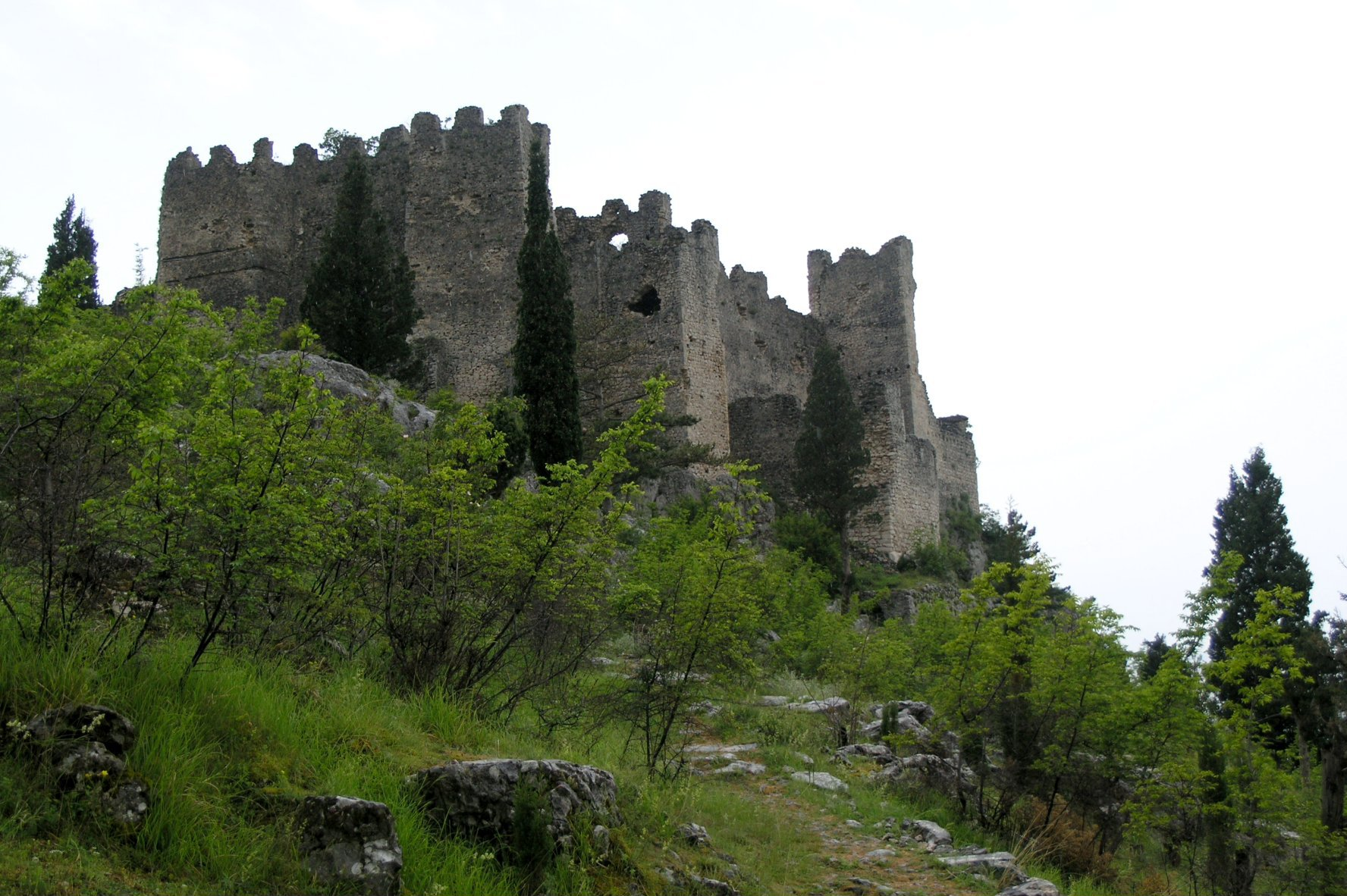
Blagaj, near Mostar, the seat of Kosača

Fortress Novi, today in Herceg Novi, winter seat of Kosača.

Stjepan Vukčić Kosača (1404– 22 May 1466) was a powerful Bosnian nobleman who was politically active from 1435 to 1466; the last three decades of Bosnian medieval history. During this period, three kings acceded to the Bosnian throne: Tvrtko II, Thomas (Tomaš), Stephen Tomašević (Stjepan Tomašević) and anti-king Radivoj—the older brother of King Thomas—before the country was conquered by the Ottomans.

Stjepan, a son of the Knez of Drina, Vukac Hranić, and Katarina, whose ancestry is unknown, was probably born in 1404. Stjepan's father held hereditary lands in the Upper Drina region. Stjepan was a member of the Kosača noble family and became its chieftain in 1435 when he succeeded his uncle, Duke Sandalj, as Duke of Humska zemlja and the Grand Duke of Bosnia. Stjepan influenced the development of the late Bosnian medieval state more than any other person of his era.

Stjepan supported Radivoj in the line of succession for the Bosnian throne and refused to recognise the ascension of King Thomas, leading to a series of civil wars in the kingdom. During this time, Stjepan added the title herzog (Serbo-Croatian: herceg) to his intitulation. While searching for help, he aligned himself first with the Ottoman Empire then the Crown of Aragon, and again the Ottoman Empire. The marriage of King Thomas and Stjepan's daughter Katarina temporarily restored peace, but with the death of King Thomas and the ascension of his son and heir, Stephen Tomašević, to the Bosnian throne, peace was finally restored and reconciliation was achieved. This ensured the nobility's, including Herceg Stjepan's, full support of the king and loyalty for the kingdom, which was facing the Ottomans' advancement.

It was Stjepan's herceg title that gave rise to the name of Herzegovina (Serbo-Croatian: Hercegovina), which was used as early as 1 February 1454 in a letter Ottoman commander Esebeg wrote from Skopje. In 1470, Herzegovina was separated from the Sanjak of Bosnia and reorganised into the Sanjak of Herzegovina, with a seat in Foča. The name remains in use for the southernmost region of Bosnia and Herzegovina. The town of Herceg Novi in present-day Montenegro, which was founded by Tvrtko I of Bosnia as Sveti Stefan—the name that from the beginning gave way to a name Novi (literally "New"; also known as Castelnuovo in Italian, New Castle in English)—later came to Kosača possession and become their winter seat. During this era, the town was renamed again by adding Stjepan's title herceg (Serbo-Croatian pronunciation of German ''herzog'') to the name Novi, which gave it the current name of Herceg Novi.

== Early life and rise ==
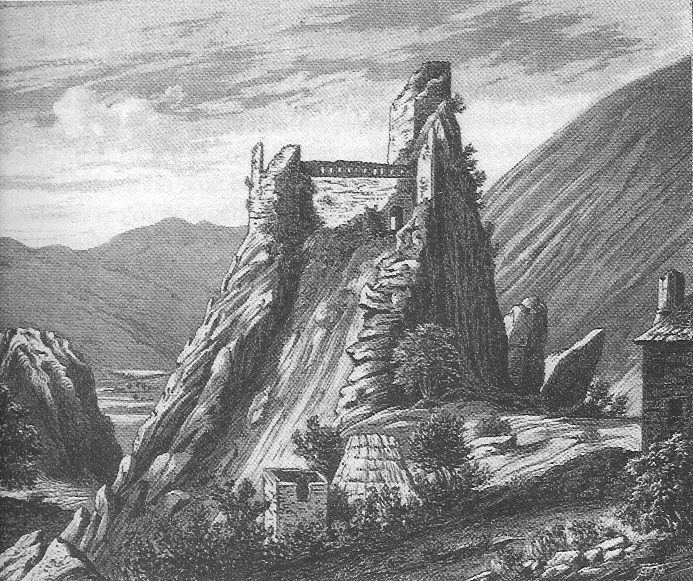
Ključ, developed by Sandalj, was Kosača's favorite residence, along with Blagaj and Novi.

Stjepan Vukčić Kosača, who was probably born in 1404, was the son of Knez of Drina Vukac Hranić Kosača and his wife Katarina, whose ancestry is unknown. Stjepan's father's modest hereditary lands were located in the Upper Drina region, situated in the eastern parts of the Kingdom of Bosnia. It was centered around the village which bears the family name, Kosače, to this day, and is located near Ilovača in the župa of Osanica, some 12 km southwest of Goražde.

In the first two decades of the 15th century, following the death of its first king Tvrtko I, the Kingdom of Bosnia began developing into a less-centralised state with three powerful noble families Pavlović, Vukčić, and Hranić, These families had significant independence in the conduct of their political and economic affairs. They influenced the kingdom's political life to the point at which they had an important role in the accession and succession of the kings, including steering foreign policy. During this period, between 1392 and 1420, several rulers acceded to the Bosnian throne: Stephen Dabiša (1391–1395), Helen (1395–1398), Stephen Ostoja (1398–1404; 1409–1418), Tvrtko II (1404–1409), Stephen Ostojić (1418–1420). Still, Bosnian unity was symbolized in the Bosnian crown, with the royal authority having a place of honor in it, and the Bosnian Church, which was schismatic and independent from both the Catholic and Eastern Orthodox churches. Toward the end of the second decade of the 15th century, however, only Stjepan's uncle Sandalj remained powerful. The state authority became influential again, and the throne was more stable.

Stjepan was the fraternal nephew of one of the powerful Bosnian magnates, Sandalj Hranić, who was the Bosnian Grand Duke and chieftain of the Kosača family. In 1419, Stjepan's uncle Sandalj, who was childless, decided to choose him as his heir. When his father died in 1432, Stjepan inherited his lands in the Upper Drina along with the title Knez of Drina that came with it. Sandalj died on 15 March 1435, and Stjepan succeeded him. Along with Sandalj's noble titles, Stjepan inherited his uncle's lands with all of the attendant obligations, alliances, antagonisms, and conflicting interests. Upon succeeding his uncle, Stjepan became the most powerful magnate in Bosnia.

=== Citizenship of Dubrovnik ===
State Flag of the Ragusan Republic

Along with his father and uncles Sandalj and Vuk, Stjepan was admitted into the nobility of the Republic of Ragusa. The republic was an aristocratic maritime state centred on the city of Dubrovnik in South Dalmatia, surrounded since 1326 by the piece of medieval Bosnian state territory known as Primorje.

It was customary for the republic to grant all the principal Bosnian nobility the status of citizenry and the republic's nobility. It was also customary to grant them a palace and a refuge in case of need in Dubrovnik. The City Council granted Stjepan, and his sons Vladislav and Vlatko, citizenship by the charter dated 30 October 1435, a palace and a refuge by the same charter.

=== Struggle for family inheritance ===
In 1435, a few days after Sandalj's death, legitimate Bosnian king Tvrtko II was forced to flee when the Ottomans put forward Radivoj and assured him support from important Bosnian noblemen Sandalj Hranić and Radislav Pavlović, as well as the Despotate of Serbia. Tvrtko II returned from a two-year exile in Hungary to assume the throne for the second time. Stjepan's takeover from his uncle was met with hope among his neighbours, who anticipated Stjepan would be weak and opportunistically diverted their attention toward his inheritance.

The Holy Emperor King Sigismund wanted to take Hum. He relied on Tvrtko II, who was mostly inactive in his first year of his reign. The Bosnian king then approached Stjepan and assured him of good relations with him, contrary to Sigismund's expectations. This prompted Radislav Pavlović to seek support from the Ottomans and report on the harmonious relations between the king and Stjepan, whose relationship remained close until at least 1440.

Sigismund then turned to Stjepan's other enemies within and outside Bosnia. He successfully sought help from Bosnian noblemen against Stjepan, most of all the Radivojevićs and Vojsalićs, and tried to persuade Dubrovnik to join this coalition. Sigismund also ordered his vassals, primarily Matko Talovac and other Croatian noblemen of the Frankopan family, to attack and retain the land of Hum for him.

==== Conflicts in Neretva and with Pavlovićs ====
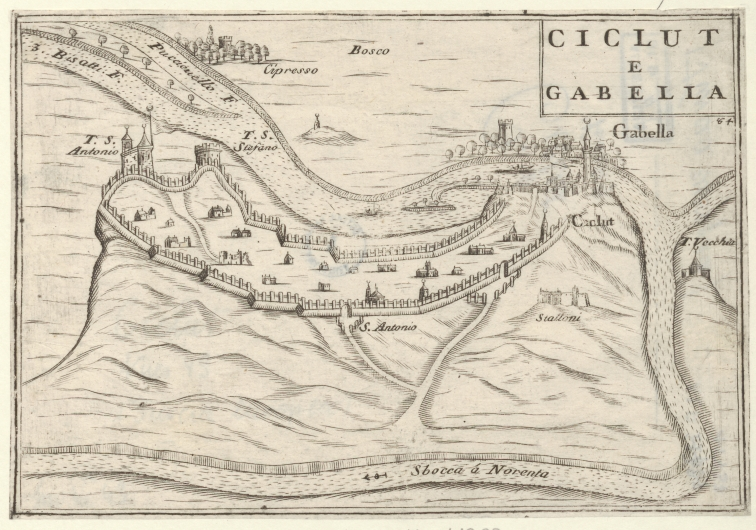
An old map of market town Drijeva on the Neretva, in today Gabela, Bosnia and Herzegovina

The first major Bosnian nobility to act was Radislav Pavlović, who engaged Stjepan in the eastern Hum. At the same time, the Vojsalićs and Radivojevićs attacked in the Lower Neretva valley with success. Pavlović acted three days after Sandalj's death on 18 March, and on March 29, he was expected to enter Dračevica. Despite Stjepan being under intense military pressure to the west of the Neretva River from the Hungarian king, his Croatian vassals, and Bosnian allies, Pavlović managed to seize some of Stjepan's lands but was unable to cause serious damage. Radislav then asked the Ragusans to mediate and help him achieve peace. Reluctant to take up the undertaking, they responded by saying Bosnia had many noblemen better suited for the task. Later, the Ragusans led the negotiations and pleaded with both men that a war would bring many "dangers and misfortunes" to them and their subjects, and to Bosnia as a whole. Stjepan demanded that Pavlović cede lands he had taken earlier, but after many missions to both noblemen's courts, the negotiations failed. Other involved Bosnians were Vojsalić's and Radivojević's. Đurađ Vojsalić's attack had produced some results. He took the medieval market town (transl. trg, trgovište) Drijeva, which also favoured Radivojević, so the coalition between Vojsalić and Radivojević, including Sigismund, who also wanted Drijeva, had conflicting interests. Sigismund asked Dubrovnik to pay him all of the customs tolls and dispatched some of his men to Drijeva to set up the new regimen.

The Republic of Venice also tried to take advantage during the power transfer from Sandalj to Stjepan. Venice unsuccessfully tried to take over the fortress of Novi via neighbouring Kotor and its knez's manoeuvring. Venice thought it could take the town by exerting pressure and influence on the fortress' castellan (governor). Despite the problems, and with some critical moments, Stjepan firmly retained the town.

During these initial struggles, Stjepan had help from the Ottomans, who supported him, and he had Bosnian anti-king Radivoj at his court. Stjepan's situation was challenging but not critical. He invited the Ottomans to Bosnia, and they helped him to overcome all of his adversities.

==== Acquiring Trebinje ====
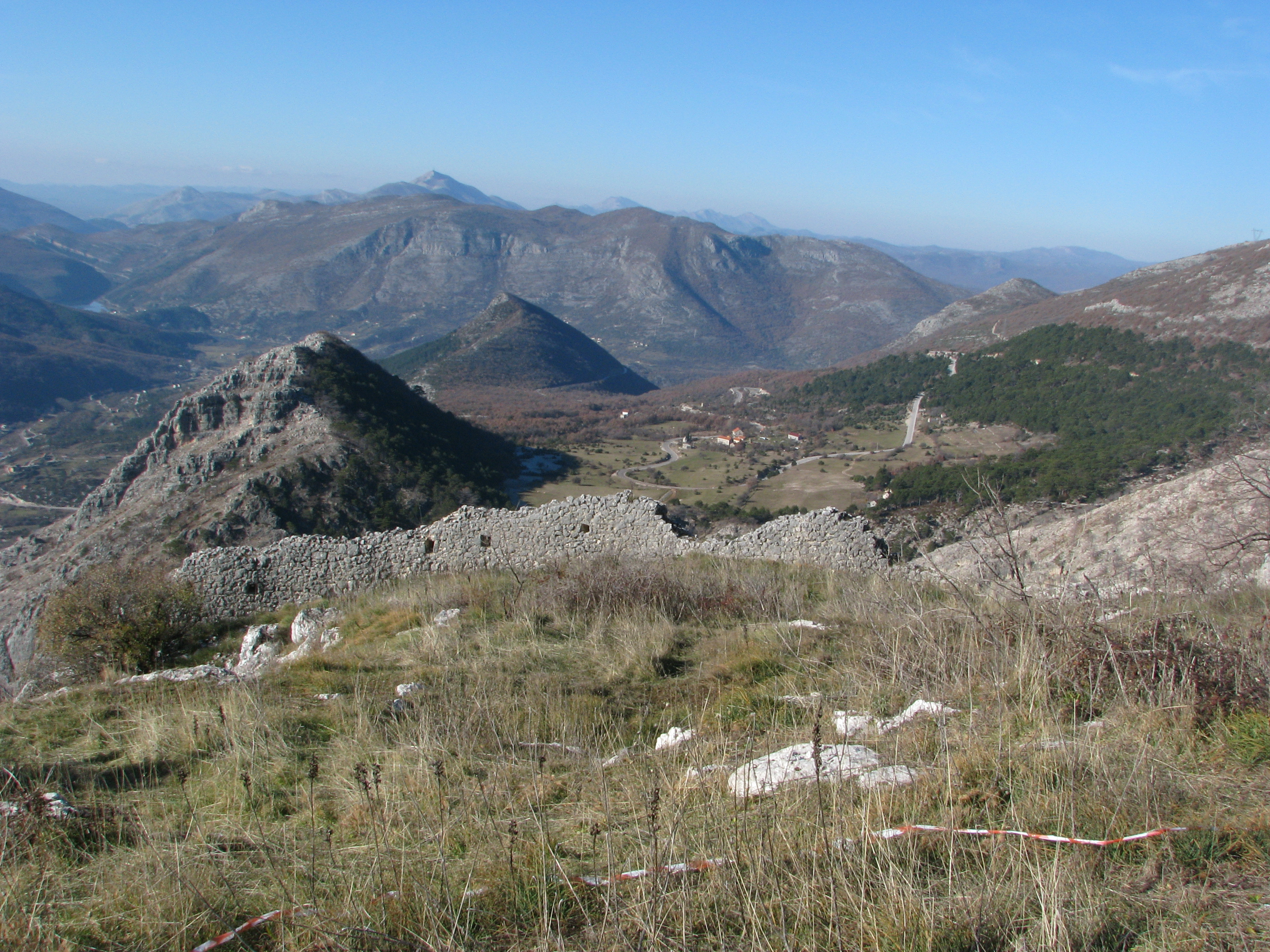
Klobul fortress, at the northern approach to Trebinje, was the last stronghold of Pavlovićs in their lands in the south, before it was taken over by Stjepan Vukčić

During the initial conflicts for his inheritance, Stjepan Vukčić's most persistent adversary was Duke Radislav Pavlović, against whom the alliance between King Tvrtko II and Stjepan turned. By the end of 1437, Duke Radislav had also fallen out of favour with the Sublime Porte, while Stjepan received a signal from the Sultan to take Trebinje from him. At the beginning of 1438, Radislav Pavlović was in a difficult situation; Stjepan took Trebinje from him and recaptured the town of Jeleč in Upper Podrinje, which Radislav probably seized from Kosača immediately after Sandalj's death. Pavlović's other fortress Klobuk in Vrm was besieged. At that point, the Ragusans told Stjepan he "took revenge on his enemies more than any one of his predecessors". Stjepan's triumph was short-lived, however, as Radislav soon regained the sultan's sympathy. Stjepan had to return Trebinje and other lands he had recently taken from Radislav. Probably through Ottoman mediation, two magnates started negotiations, which lasted until June 1439, ending in peace between the two houses and the renewal of family ties; Radislav remarried Stjepan's sister.

At the beginning of 1440, Radislav Pavlović's situation dramatically changed. Because he owed the Sultan a large sum of money, probably having indebted himself during the campaigns to regain his lands and Trebinje in 1439, the Sultan decided Stjepan Vukčić should repay that debt and, in return, regain Trebinje and its surroundings from Pavlović. In March, Stjepan recaptured Trebinje, which caused war to break out, and in April, new negotiations between the "two main eyes of the Bosnian kingdom", as the Ragusans used to say, pandering to Stjepan's vanity, while trying to mediate between the two noblemen.

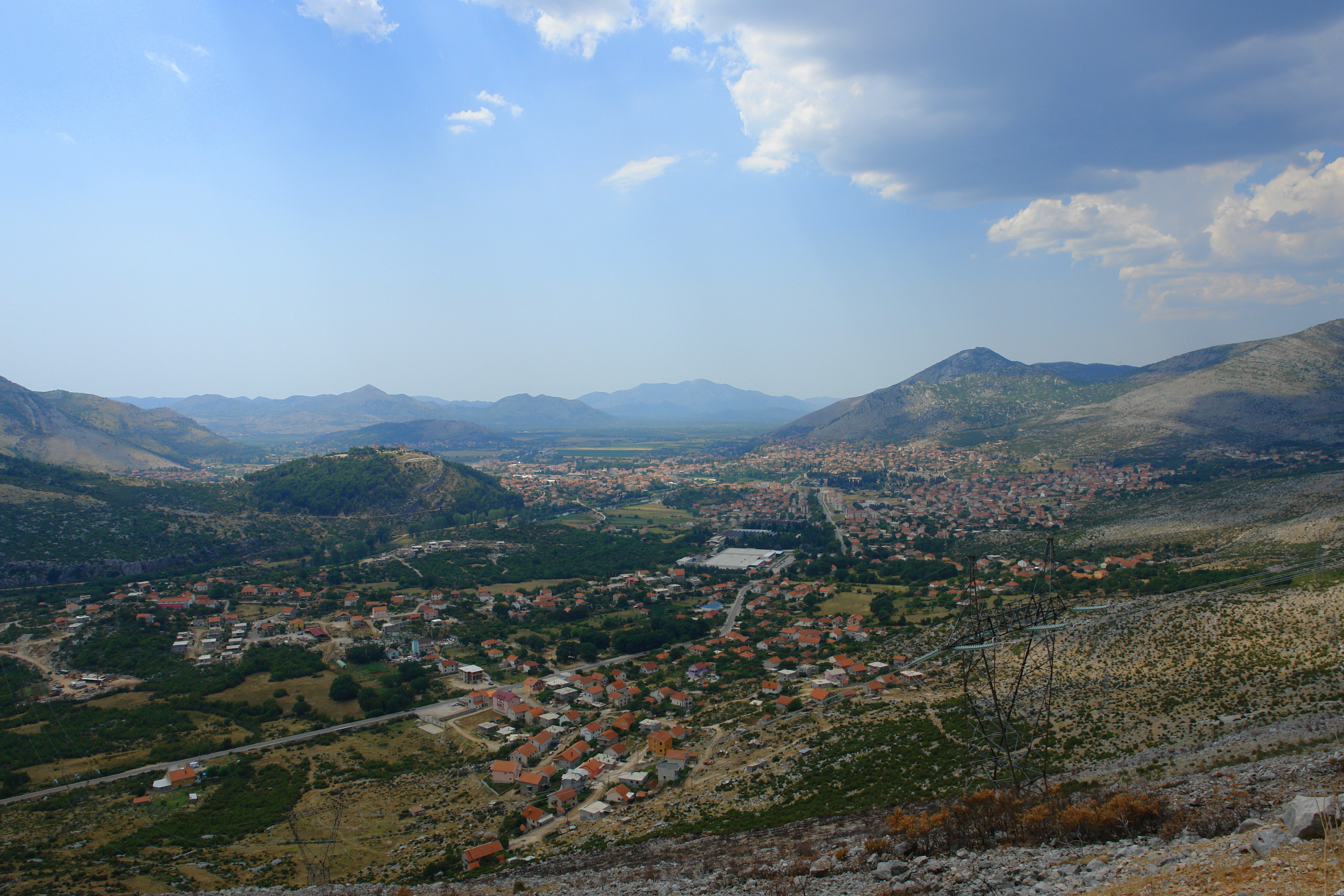
Wider area of modern Trebinje.

While Bosnians fought for personal and petty-proprietary reasons, events around them hinted at problems with far-reaching consequences that would shake the country in the coming years. The Ragusans, guided by logic and observing Ottoman policy, which was quite transparent, advised King Tvrtko II, Duke Stjepan and Duke Radislav to implore the Sultan to lower his impossible demands jointly, and suggested it would be best and easiest if the three men together pay the Sultan thousands of ducats for Radislav's lands. They warned their Bosnian neighbours that friendship bought for money is neither firm nor permanent. They indicated the fate of other regional lords, Serbs, Byzantines, Albanians, who had perished or suffered due to their discord. Neither the fall of Serbia nor increasing Ottoman pressure made the Bosnian lords any less reckless. Stjepan and Radislav continued their quarrel while litigating before the Porte through envoys.

=== Incursion into Zeta ===
Stjepan's offensive into Zeta (1441–44), Podgorica, Medun, in Upper Zeta, and Bar, in Lower Zeta, were conquered.

At the beginning of July 1439, Murad II set out to conquer Bosnia's eastern neighbour, the Serbian despotate, and was joined by his Bosnian vassal Stjepan Vukčić Kosača, who participated in a devastation of the Serb realm. At the same time in the west, Albert II of Germany, who acceded to the Hungarian throne after Sigismund died in late 1437, also died two years later. A lengthy succession crisis broke out in Hungary, which prompted Bosnian Duke Stjepan Vukčić and King Tvrtko II to conquer the lands of Croatian lord Matija Talovac. Stjepan immediately besieged Omiš, which fell to him after eight months, and probably took Poljica from the Croatian ban. Bosnians continued their offensive against the Croatian ban and his family until June 1441, when the Talovac brothers sought a truce.

After the Ottomans' conquest of the Despotate of Serbia, and Stjepan's participation in the ravaging of it, the Principality of Zeta was vulnerable, tempting Stjepan to conquer it. He exploited the Ottoman successes and directed his attention to the unprotected province. He asked the Kotor knez to assist him in capturing it, and presented himself as Balšić's successor. Stjepan also contacted Stefan Maramonte, son of Konstantin Balšić and Helena Thopia, who was fighting as a condottiero in southern Italy. The postponement of the conquest of Zeta was caused by the Serbian despot Đurađ's prolonged stay there in mid-1440, when he unsuccessfully attempted to reconcile with the Ottomans. In April 1441, after failing to get amnesty from the Porte, Đurađ hurriedly departed Zeta, taking refuge in Ragusa. The Sultan ordered Stjepan to attack Ragusa because the city gave refuge to Đurađ, but this threat prompted the despot to leave the city-state. Stjepan also attracted support from knez Stefan Crnojević. After the departure of Đurad, Stjepan engaged and by September 1441, he had occupied Upper Zeta (Serbo-Croatian: Gornja Zeta) to the left bank of the Morača river. He had help from Stefan, Crnojević's oldest brother, who represented the Crnojević family and was awarded with control over the five large katuns in Upper Zeta.

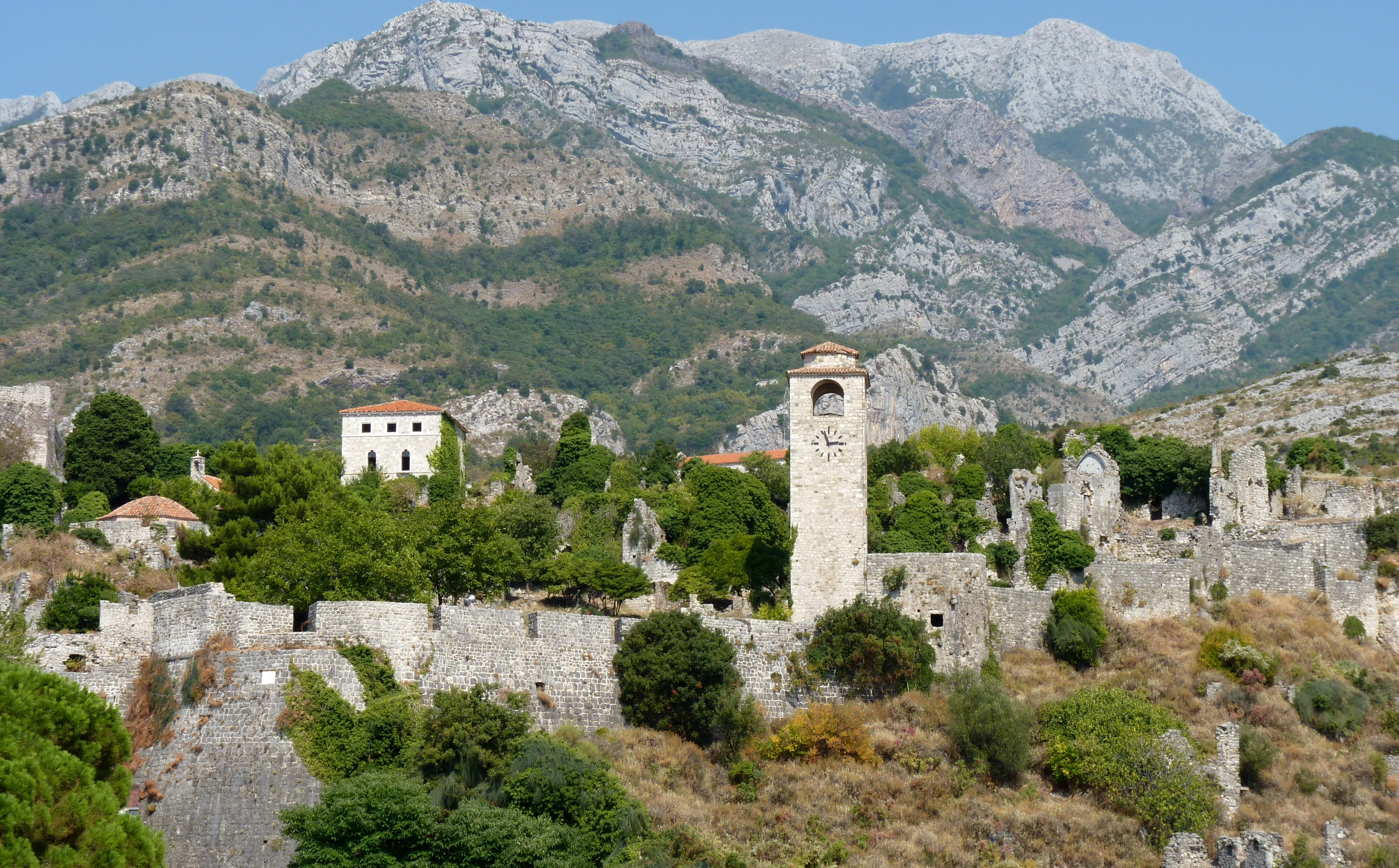
In his operations in Lower Zeta, Stjepan captured Old Bar.

In his conquest of Lower Zeta (Serbo-Croatian: Donja Zeta), Stjepan faced a much tougher foe, the Republic of Venice. During the expansion into Upper Zeta, the Venetian government criticised Kotor's knez in 1439 for refusing to help Stjepan and because the knez attempted to thwart Stjepan's actions. The Venetians adopted the same strategy because they anticipated that Kotor would be trapped between Stjepan's territories and that, as the Ottoman vassal, he could endanger all of the other cities in Lower Zeta and further along the Albanian coast. The Republic of Venice did not intend to allow further Bosnian expansion in this direction. The Venetians tried to influence Stjepan's actions via their knez in Skadar and by invoking Stjepan's obligations as an ally of the despot Đurađ, and themselves considered occupying the territories of Lower Zeta they did not already hold. Stjepan took Bar in March 1442, which turned Budva and Drivast against him. Stjepan's armies approached and besieged both cities, which resisted for two months, but both eventually surrendered to Venice. Because of these engagements in Zeta, the Venetian Republic and Stjepan entered the war, which resulted in expansion for the Venetians, who acquired additional lands on the eastern coast of the Adriatic.

=== Consolidation ===
In his first years in power, Stjepan Vukčić consolidated his position as the family chieftain and preserved the inherited lands; he also gained important new territories of Omiš and Poljica, pushing the Pavlovićs out of their southern regions, the most important of which were Trebinje and Dračevica, and captured the whole of Upper Zeta and Bar in Lower Zeta. Radislav Pavlović died in late 1441, changing the balance of power in Bosnia. Although hostilities between Duke Stjepan and his sister, Radislav's widow, and her sons Duke Ivaniš, Knez Petar II and Knez Nikola, lasted for several months after her husband's death, Stjepan captured the last of Pavlović's southern strongholds, the Klobuk fortress, before peace was brokered between them in May 1442. Radislav's successor, Duke Ivaniš Pavlović, as a Bosnian King Tvrtko II's man, maintained his side of the bargain. However, a civil war broke out between Duke Stjepan, his eldest son, Vladislav, and the king.

Consolidating his power, Stjepan's influence upon the development of the late-medieval Kingdom of Bosnia became greater than of any other Bosnian nobleman. Throughout his reign, Stjepan, to strengthen and centralise his rule locally, was forced to suppress the aspirations of local nobility subordinate to him, who sought to be as independent as possible from Stjepan's supremacy or escape it altogether. The same thing happened in the Bosnian state between the throne and Stjepan within the local framework of his reign. Whenever the opportunity arose, Stjepan's vassals would deviate from his authority or join the king against him during the civil wars.

== Civil wars ==
=== Royal succession and outbreak of civil war ===
King Tvrtko II died in September 1443, and on 5 December that year, stanak approved the accession of Thomas (Tomaš), his first cousin and heir, to the throne. It is unclear if Thomas was chosen by Tvrtko II or elected by stanak, and if Stjepan participated in his election. Stjepan was the new king's opponent from the start and opted for Thomas's exiled brother Radivoj, a candidate put forward by the Ottoman Empire. Sensing problems, Ragusans dispatched envoys to Stjepan's court with instructions to appeal to him by arguing he is now "the most powerful and most wise Bosnian lord" who must preserve "the peace and unity in the country"; if he does, it will bring him "glory throughout the world".

In 1443, the Papacy sent envoys to Thomas and Stjepan about a counter-offensive against the Ottomans, but Thomas and Stjepan were at war. Duke Ivaniš Pavlović, who was the second-most-powerful nobleman in Bosnia after Stjepan, and who was passive when the conflict broke out during the final year in the reign of Tvrtko II, was dispatched by King Thomas to attack Stjepan. The Hungarian regent John Hunyadi had recognised Thomas. Stjepan turned to King Alfonso V of Aragon, who made him "Knight of the Virgin" but did not provide any troops. On 15 February 1444, Stjepan signed a treaty with the King of Aragon and Naples, becoming his vassal in exchange for Alfonso's help against his enemies—King Thomas, Duke Ivaniš Pavlović and the Republic of Venice. In the same treaty, Stjepan promised to pay Alfonso regular tribute instead of paying the Ottoman sultan, as he had done until then. However, the senior-vassal relationship between King Alfonso and Stjepan had no meaningful effects and remained theoretical.

For the next seventeen years of Thomas's rule, events provoked by this dynamism between the two men were changing rapidly in terms of historical scale. Civil war broke out in 1444 and continued into the 1450s, with many armistices agreed and broken, treaties and peace agreements signed. As Stjepan Vukčić was a staunch supporter of and adherent to the Bosnian Church, Thomas's conversion to Roman Catholicism, probably by the time of negotiations to marry the duke's daughter Catherine between 1445 and 1446, were another obstacle in their relations.

=== Srebrenica and Drijeva issues ===
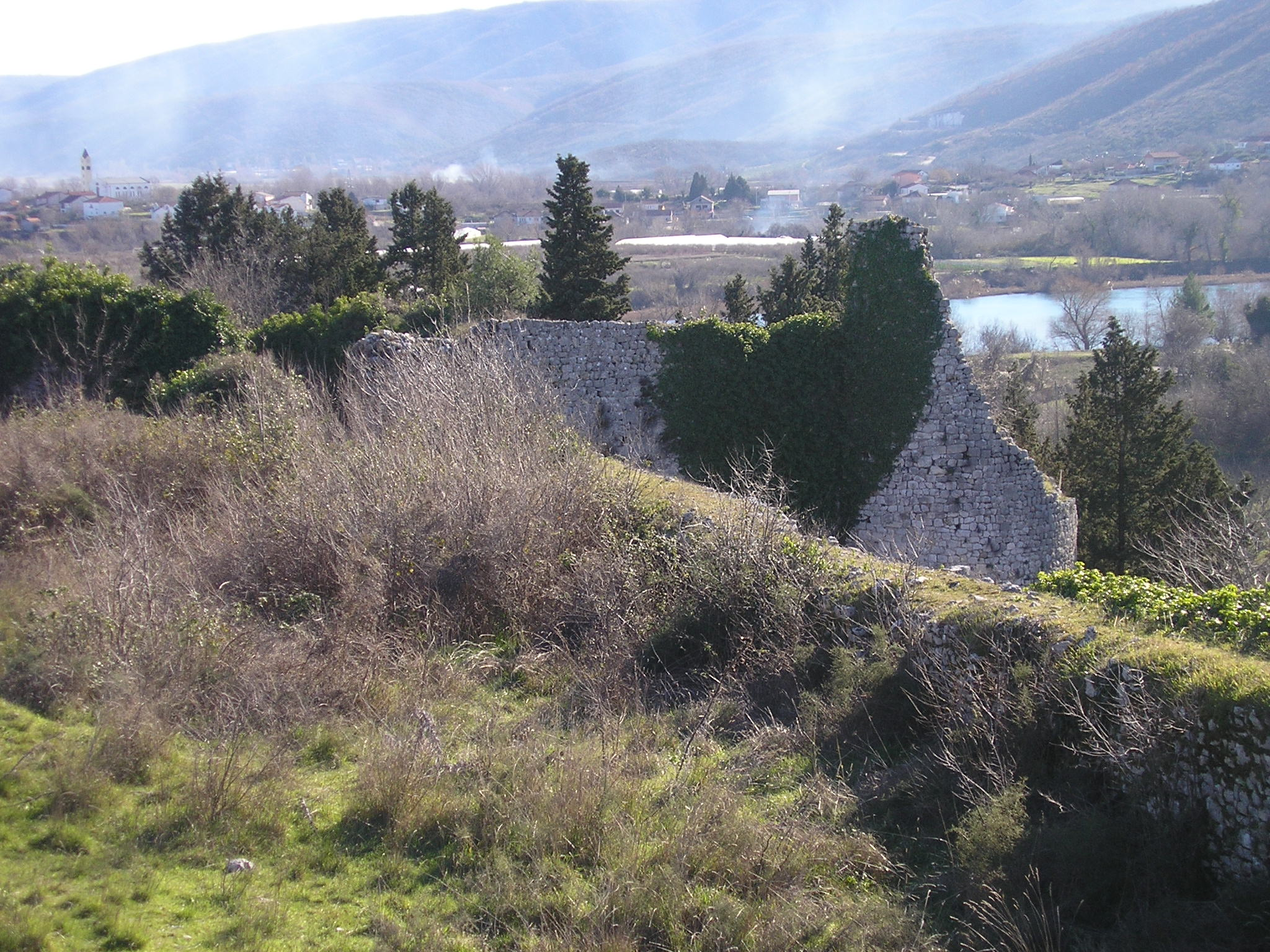
Old market-town (trg) Drijeva – the Neretva visible beyond the walls.

The cause of the series of conflicts is unknown. Still, King Thomas moved resolutely against his opponents in the regions of Lower Neretva and Middle Drina around Srebrenica (Middle Podrinje). With Duke Ivaniš Pavlović and Duke Sladoje Semković, he entered the Lower Neretva valley in January 1444, where the Radivojevićs joined them, and in early February they captured Drijeva, a medieval market town (trgovište). In March, the king appears to have brokered a truce with Stjepan and also recaptured Srebrenica, the mining town in Middle Podrinje, which was defended by the Ottomans and the fortress of Srebrenica, and was preparing another attack on Stjepan in August. Ottoman retaliation against the king allowed Stjepan to regain the lost possessions in the Neretva Valley and again place Thomas' allies, the Radivojević noble family, under his authority. Also in 1444, Stjepan established an alliance with despot Đurađ Branković, against Thomas and Venice. In April 1445, Thomas lost Srebrenica, which was taken from him by Despot Đurađ, but he continued to prepare for war against Stjepan, and together with the Pavlovićs, he soon regained Drijeva.

=== Peace and royal marriage ===
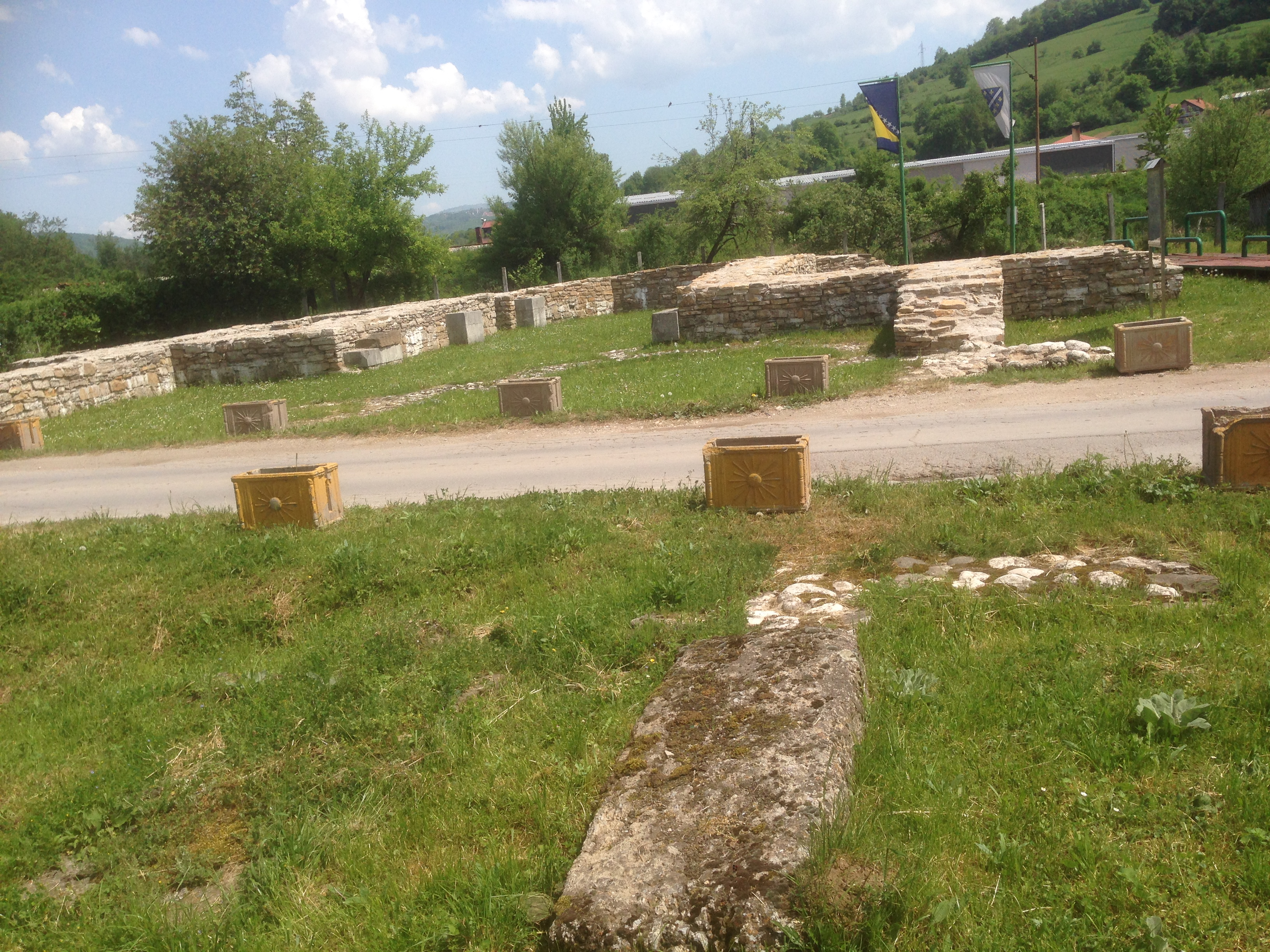
Coronation and burial church in Mile, Visoko, royal capital of the kingdom.

Having failed to strengthen his royal authority by force, King Thomas sought another way to pacify the kingdom. A rapprochement with Stjepan via marriage with his daughter Catherine of Bosnia (Katarina), was probably mooted by 1445, when Thomas sought improved relations with the Holy See to be cleared of the "stain of illegitimacy" and to receive an annulment of his union with commoner and krstjanka, Vojača. Negotiations between Thomas and Stjepan intensified in early 1446. Tommaso Tommasini, Bishop of Lesina, converted the King from the Bosnian Church to Roman Catholicism, but only by 1457 Cardinal Juan Carvajal performed the baptism.

In mid-1446, the two rivals had made peace again. Stjepan Vukčić recognised Thomas as king and the pre-war borders between the royal demesne and the land of Hum were restored, but the king retook Srebrenica later that year. The royal wedding which sealed this peace took place in mid-May 1446 in Milodraž. It was conducted through Catholic rite, marked by elaborate festivities, and followed by the couple's coronation in Mile. By this time, Catherine, who had also been a krstjanka (adherent of the Bosnian Church), had converted to Roman Catholicism. The peace between the king and Duke Stjepan lasted for the next two years until 1448, but relations again deteriorated.

=== Renewal of conflict and new peace ===
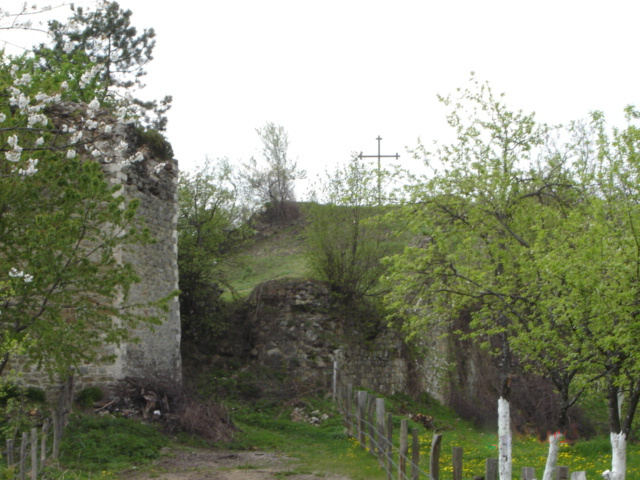
Market-town (trg) and mines of Srebrenica were defended by the Srebrenica Fortress.

In late 1446, King Thomas recaptured Srebrenica but agreed with Despot Đurađ Branković to share a profit from taxes and the town's rich silver mines. Peace between Stjepan and the king displeased the Ottomans because their interest lay in dividing Bosnia. Stjepan's relations with the Serbian despot Đurađ also deteriorated, mainly because of the Srebrenica issue. While the king enjoyed a period of stability in relations with the despot, in late 1447, Stjepan attempted to re-negotiate a reconciliation with Đurađ by dispatching envoys to offer him "peace and alliance".

In March 1448, the Ottomans sent an expedition to plunder the king's demesne. They also plundered Stjepan Vukčić's lands, burning Drijeva in the process.

At this point, the king's position was seriously impaired by the Ottoman offensive and the rapprochement of his father-in-law, Stjepan, with the despot. In September 1448, the despot's brother-in-law Thomas Kantakouzenos attacked Thomas' troops while Stjepan helped the despot recapture Srebrenica. The king and Duke Ivaniš Pavlović successfully retaliated against Stjepan and his Serbian ally in late 1449. In February 1450, they retook Srebrenica; in April and May, they recaptured Drijeva. New peace negotiations began in late 1450, and a short-lived peace was concluded at the beginning of 1451.

=== Second Konavle War and infighting ===
In 1451, Stjepan Vukčić attacked the Republic of Ragusa in Konavle and laid siege to Dubrovnik, starting Second Konavle War. He wanted to take Konavle back from Dubrovnik on the justification that Ragusans had swindled his, at the time, too young uncle Sandalj, into selling Konavle to Dubrovnik. Because Stjepan had been made a Ragusan nobleman earlier, the Ragusan government proclaimed him a traitor. A reward of 15,000 ducats, a palace in Dubrovnik worth 2,000 ducats, and an annual income of 300 ducats was offered to anyone who would kill Stjepan, along with the promise of hereditary Ragusan noble status. The threat seemed to have worked because Stjepan abandoned the siege and moved to Kotor to help destroying an Albanian marauder who were reported had come to operate around the city.

After King Thomas and Despot Đurađ reconciled, Dubrovnik proposed a league against Stjepan. Apart from the theoretical ceding of some of Stjepan's family territories to the Republic of Ragusa, Thomas' charter from 18 December 1451 obliged him to attack Stjepan.

In July 1451, Dubrovnik entered into secret relations with Herceg's son Knez Vladislav and Duke of Hum, Ivaniš Vlatković, both of whom were loyal to the Bosnian throne. The first trace of secret negotiations with Knez Vladislav is found in a letter from Dubrovnik to their negotiator dated July 23. In the last days of July or the first days of August, Vladislav expressed the desire to ally with Dubrovnik against his father, expecting the city to help him with money and troops. Moreover, Vladislav advocated that Dubrovnik make an alliance with King Thomas and that he also be given help, since there was already an alliance between him and the King. From another letter by Dubrovnik, written in 1459, it is clear that the initiative that despot and King Thomas strike together against the Herceg came from Herceg's wife Jelena and Knez Vladislav.

The relations in Herceg's family greatly influenced the opening of the infighting and Vladislav's rebellion. Still, also whole conspiracy against Herceg. The reason behind infighting can be found in a writing by the Italian chronicler Gaspare Broglio Tartaglia da Lavello, who says that Herzeg's envoys brought from Florence a young Sienese girl, intending to present her to his son, Vladislav. This was probably Jelisaveta, a young concubine to whom Herceg fell in love and even imprisoned his son briefly to have her for himself. Herceg's wife Jelena was also looking to take revenge on her husband for this. Vladislav, certainly under her influence, decided to rebel against his father. The alliance was forged in greatest secrecy, and sealed by a charter of partnership, written, signed and issued by Vladislav in Drinaljevo župa near Tođevac fortress, on August 15.

On March 29, 1452, Vladislav openly declared his hostility against his father. His mother and grandmother stood by him. Duke Ivaniš Vlatković joined him with his brothers. The rebellion was well organized, so that on the first day, Vladislav and his allies occupied a significant territory with equally significant fortresses such as the capital Blagaj, Tođevac, Vratar on the Sutjeska, two cities at the Neretva bridge, Vjenačac in Nevesinje, Imotski, Kruševac and Novi in Luka, and a little later Ljubuški. Already in April, it was expected that King Tomas will come to Hum to help the efforts. King came with his vassal Petar Vojsalić and a military contingent in mid-April, when allied forces including Vladislav, Vlatkovićs and all the other petty Hum's nobility came together against Herceg and his younger son Vlatko.

The alliance was very successful, especially because Hum's general population was extremely dissatisfied with Stjepan's rule, the king and despot were in agreement and the Porte, on huge Herceg disadvantage, was neutral; only Venice remained friend with him during the war, and he had his local vassals. Though at the beginning Herceg Stjepan could count on Pavlović's troops, because they were too weak after Radisav's death and had signed a peace agreement with him, but being loyal king's men, Ivaniš and Petar II Pavlović restrained themselves from participating actively. So, the alliance could have defeated Stjepan if a quarrel had not broken out over the city of Blagaj, which King Tomas demanded from Vladislav. Still, which he did not agree to relinquish. After several unsuccessful negotiations, this led the king to leave the alliance. The Ragusans, disappointed by the king's decision, withdrew their fleet from the Neretva and mercenaries too. Thus abandoned, Vladislav and the Vlatković brothers lost the upper hand on the battlefield. In summer 1452 preparations for negotiation to stop the war slowly started. In February 1453 negotiations began, most likely on Herceg's initiative. But before its start, during preparations for negotiations in late summer and fall 1452, Ragusans tried to persuade young Vladislav, now duke, not to enter negotiations with his father and younger brother, claiming that Stjepan had promised to exact revenge on Vladislav and his brother "thinking the same", citing Herceg's letters to Venice as evidence. However, since they could not completely prevent the negotiations between Vladislav and Herceg, the Dubrovnik government wanted to find at least a way to influence them. In January 1453, Ragusans expressed to the Papal legate their commitment to peace but rejected the possibility of a separate peace between any party involved. With some doubt over the exact date and place, Herceg Stjepan eventually forgave his eldest son, his wife, and Hum's nobility for rebelling against him, and everything was sealed with a treaty in a ceremony held in Pišče on the Piva, on the road to the Sokol Fortress, between 1 and 5 June, with the confirmation and vouching by the djed of the Bosnian Church and its 12 clerics, called strojniks, and led by gost Radin, who served as witnesses. It was also stipulated that the Herceg must not take any action against dukes Ivaniš Vlatković and Sladoje Semković, and knezs Đurađ Ratković and Vukašin Sanković, nor any of the nobles who were not part of the family's immediate circle, until the suspicions were first checked by the djed of the Bosnian church, twelve strojniks, among which a place was reserved for Radin Gost.

=== Religious strife ===
In the second half of 1459, King Thomas decisively acted against the Krstjani or Kristjani, followers of the Bosnian Church. Between 2,000 and 12,000 were converted to Catholicism; according to the apostolic legate Nikola Modruški, who resided in Bosnia between 1461 and 1463, the "Manichean heretics were baptised forcefully". At least 40 high-ranking members of the church hierarchy fled to Duke Stjepan, who welcomed them despite the papal request. In early 1461, to prove his commitment to the Catholic Church, King Thomas sent three bound Krstjani to Rome, where Cardinal Juan de Torquemada interrogated them. The king demanded that all of his vassals convert.

=== Final reconciliation and kingdom's unity restoration ===
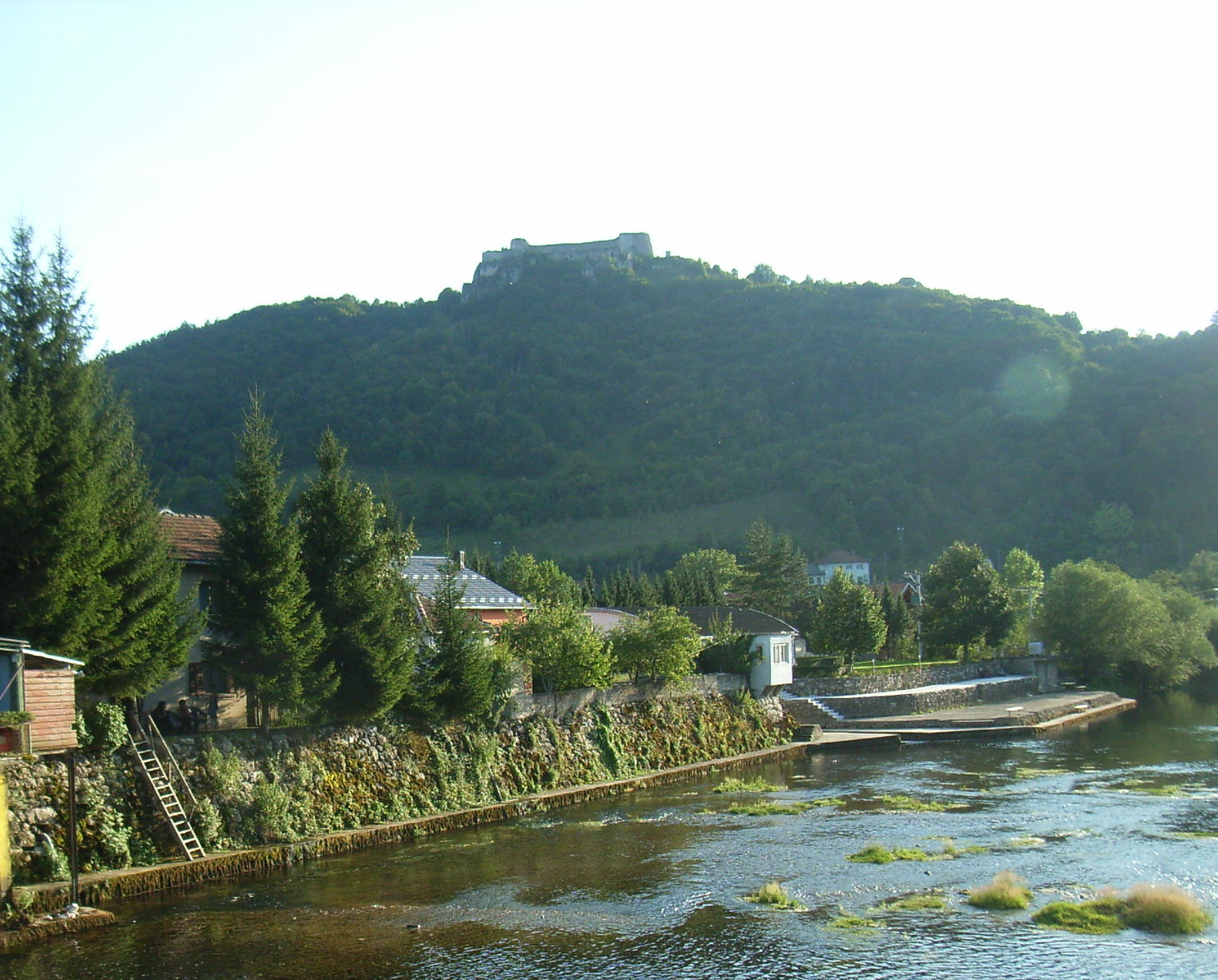
Ostrovica Castle

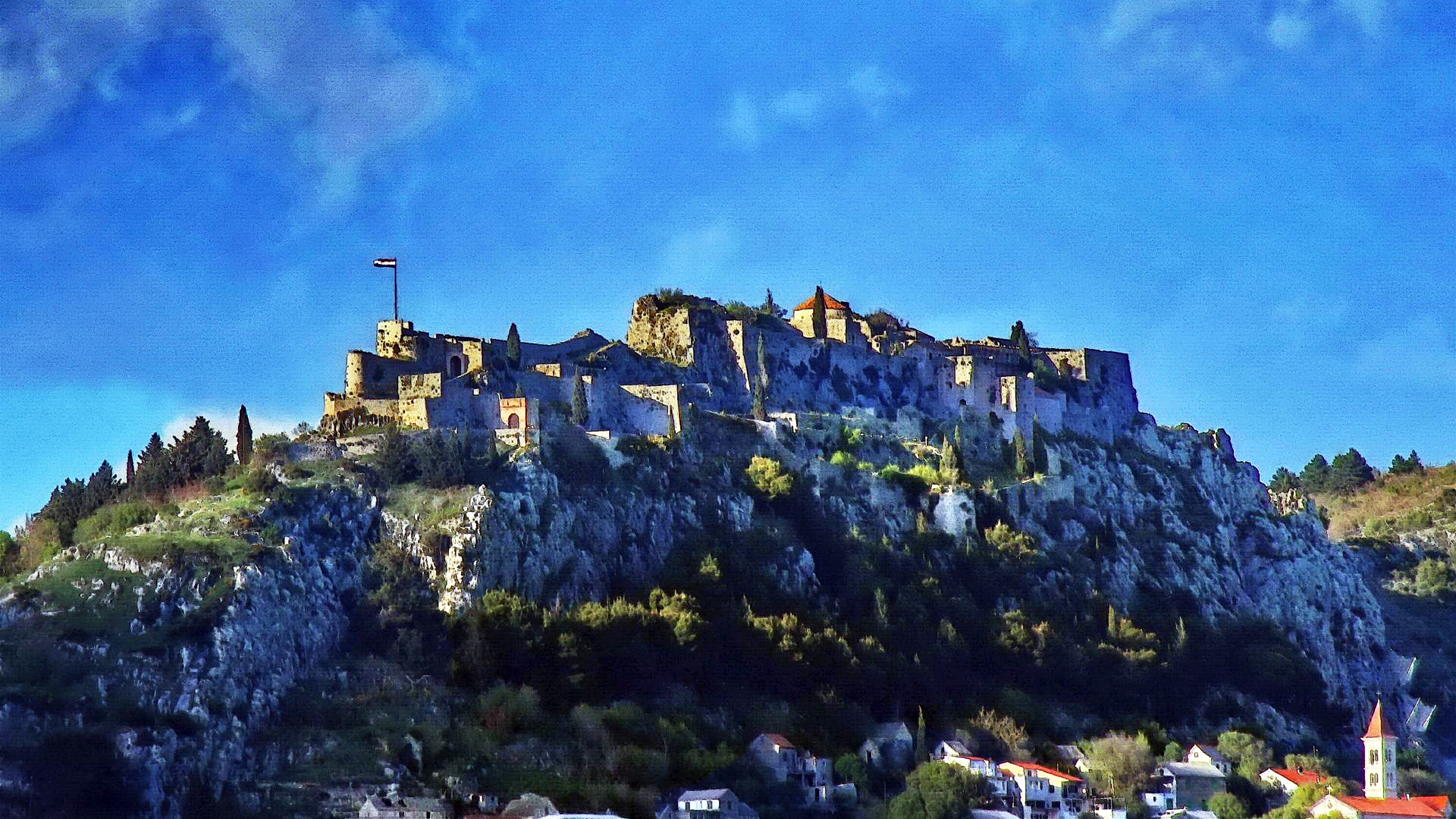
Klis Fortress

Stjepan Vukčić Kosača may have been the kingdom's most powerful nobleman,. The constant conflicts with King Thomas were due to be resolved by the king's son and heir, Stephen or Stjepan Tomašević. Stephen, a determined new king who acceded to the throne after Thomas' death, set out to resolve all disagreements within the royal family to strengthen his position. Strained relations with his stepmother, Stjepan's daughter Queen Catherine, were relaxed as he guaranteed she would retain her title and privileges. This was noted by her father, Stjepan, who wrote to Venetian officials saying the King had "taken her as his mother".

The new king, who also wanted reconciliation, took the Venetians' advice to reconcile with his step-grandfather seriously. Upon strengthening his position, peace was restored and reconciliation achieved, ensuring the nobility's absolute support of the king and loyalty to the kingdom.

For King Stephen, it was essential to get Stjepan's full support. Stjepan had sent his son and chosen heir Vlatko to Stephen's coronation. The king was proud to announce that he had assumed the kingdom's throne with the full acceptance of the nobility.

Herceg Stjepan refrained from claiming the Bosnian crown for his adolescent grandson Sigismund, Catherine's son and Stephen Tomašević's half-brother, probably realising Bosnia needed a strong, mature monarch in a time of peril. The Ottomans threatened the territory of Bosnia while attacks against the kingdom's southern edges by Pavao Špirančić, Ban of Croatia and Dalmatia, between September 1461 and the beginning of 1462, resulted in the capture of one Bosnian border town. Stjepan prepared to counter-attack with the support of Venice. Still, Stjepan and King Stephen agreed to an alliance with a knezs of Krbava, the Kurjaković noble family, which made Venice suddenly relent, fearing a strong alliance could threaten its interests in the area. They campaigned for negotiations on the ban to avoid a confrontation between the two sides. Venice was also interested in securing Klis and Ostrovica, two key fortresses on the Bosnian-Croatian border—the ban held Klis, and Ostrovica was in Bosnian hands. Ban Pavao promised to relinquish Klis to them in case of a Bosnian attack.

In the Christian world, the reconciliation of Bosnia's two most powerful men was greeted with relief. Venice appreciated the stability that was attained after many years in Bosnia. There was an expectation that Bosnia would lead the actions against Ottoman advancement. The Bosnians had earlier failed to lead the crusade, the role assigned to them in 1457, due to the dynamism between Stjepan Vukčić and the throne, which was personified at the time in King Thomas.

After more than a decade of discord, Bosnia was unified and faced increasing pressure from the Ottomans. King Stephen and Herceg Stjepan knew the Ottomans would soon attack, so throughout 1462 and early 1463, they sought help from anyone, friend or foe, who would offer assistance. On 8 and 20 March 1463, Stjepan asked Venice to allow Skanderbeg's forces to cross their territory to help him, which they did but the decision to inform their outpost in Skadar was issued on 26 April. Possibly due to this belated Venetian reaction, Skanderbeg failed to carry out his promises before Venice withdrew its permission.

== Final years, death and succession ==
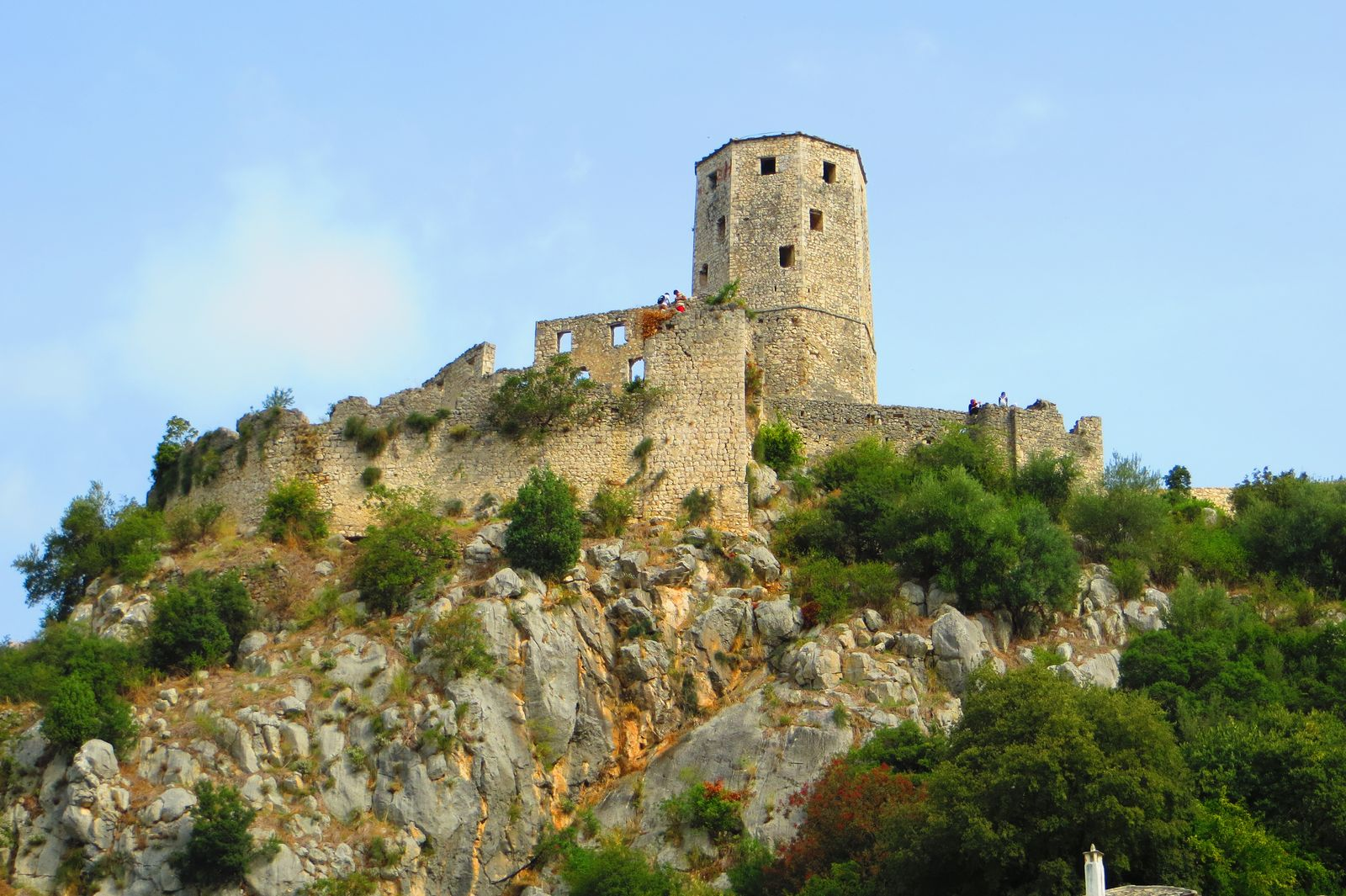
Počitelj, built by Bosnian king Tvrtko I sometime in 1383, first mentioned in 1444, fell in 1471.

After the fall of Bosnia in 1463, Herceg Stjepan Vukčić, lord of its southernmost province, lived for another three years, during which the kingdom was dismantled, all of which he blamed on his eldest son Vladislav Hercegović. Soon after taking the hearth of th Kingdom of Bosnia in 1463, Mahmud Pasha turned to herceg's lands and besieged Blagaj, after which Stjepan conceded a truce while ceding all of his lands north of Blagaj to the Ottomans. On 21 May 1466 in Novi, in front of his closest courtiers summoned as witnesses, a court chaplains gost Radin and monk David, and a chamberlain Knez Pribislav Vukotić, Stjepan, old and terminally ill, dictated his last words recorded in a testament, and leaving Vladislav out of it he blamed fall of Bosnia on him, stating that Vladislav had "brought the great Turk to Bosnia to the death and destruction of us all". The duke died the following day.

For the salvation of his soul, he left a bequest of 10,000 ducats. He distributed the rest of the money to his sons, Vlatko and Stjepan-Ahmed Pasha Hercegović, 30,000 gold ducats each, while to Vladislav, with whom he remained on bad terms for the rest of his life, Herceg did not leave any money. To his third wife Cecilia, he left 1000 ducats, and rich silverware and silver dishes, two silver belts and some gilded brocade for clothes, and everything he had given her since she came to his home. He left the most valuable personal belongings to his youngest son Stjepan-Ahmed Pasha. Apparently his father's favorite, Stjepan-Ahmed Pasha also received his father's biggest special silver dish, four necklaces made of precious stones, his mother Barbara's relics and icons, a crown decorated with pearls, rings with precious stones and a necklace, belts, her clothes and four pairs of ceremonial robes, a large red cap of gilded linen - the gift of Matthias Corvinus, a red and scarlet a cap with gilding, a red cloak made of damask with gold cords, dishes with several bowls, spoons and cups, and two ibriks, one of which belonged to Sandalj. He divided everything else, including dishes, crockery, belts, clothes and other valuables, equally among his three sons, and each of them was to receive one-third of what was in the palace in Dubrovnik. His love and special attituded for his youngest, Stjepan-Ahmed Pasha, is highlighted by the fact that Herceg left him most cherished personal belongings such as a golden icon and relics that he owned–medieval Christians believed that the spirits of particular saints were present in the relics, and that by possessing such relics they were guaranteed protection. Judging by what Herceg left for Stjepan-Ahmed, there is no doubt that he loved and cared for him the most.

Stjepan was succeeded as Herceg by his second-youngest son, Vlatko Hercegović, who struggled to retain as much of the territory as he could. Blagaj, which was in Vladislav's hands in 1452, during the war between him and his father, was Kosača's capital during Sandalj's and Stjepan's reign. The city fell in 1466 while Ključ Castle between Nevesinje and Gacko was cut off from the central part of his territory. Vlatko's actions against the Ottomans were mainly concentrated around this fort with limited success. Počitelj fell in 1471, but Herceg Vlatko had already, in 1470, realised that only a radical change in his politics could bring him some release, so he pursued and achieved a peace with the Ottomans. In the same year, the Ottomans excluded Hum from the Bosnian Sanjak and established a new, separate Sanjak of Herzegovina with its seat in Foča.

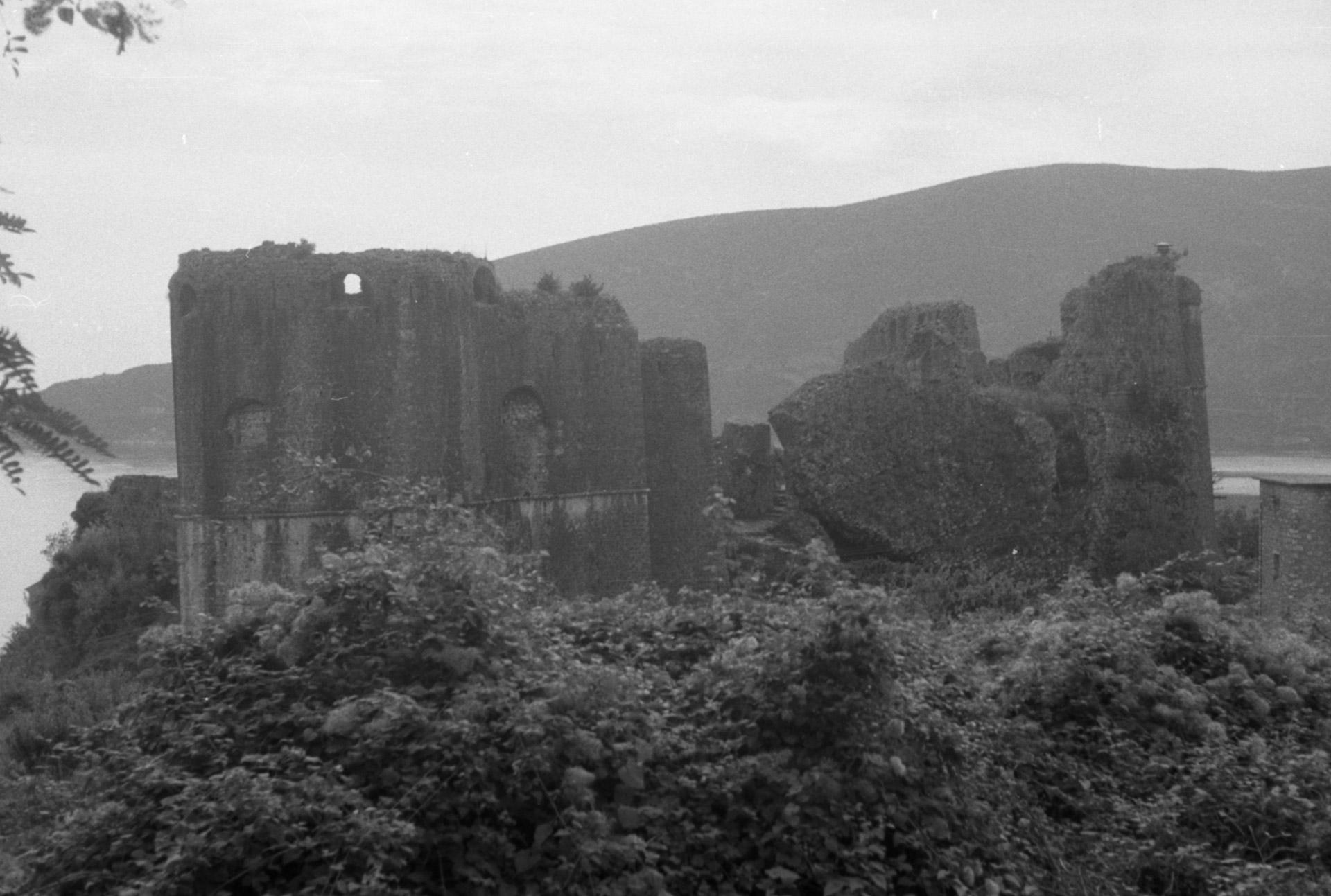
Fortress of Novi, built by Tvrtko I in 1382, with its newly founded port immediately became economic hub of the kingdom, later winter seat of Stjepan and his son Vlatko, was also the last independent point of the Bosnian state.

Attempts to restore the Bosnian kingdom, mostly under the auspices of external powers, primarily Hungarians, whom historiography sees as major culprits for its fall, lasted until the beginning of the 16th century. As early as 1465, the Ottomans installed Matija Šabančić, son of Radivoj, as the titular king of Bosnia, while the Hungarian king, Matthias Corvinus, installed Nicholas of Ilok on the Hungarian side as early as 1471. The Ottomans responded by appointing Hrvoje's great grandnephew Matija Vojsalić as the new titular king. But all these external interests and pretensions, which intertwined around the Bosnian crown and state territory, had nothing to do with real Bosnian independence—the independent Bosnian state tradition played no role in whatever was intended by either the Hungarians or the Ottomans.

The only real remnants of the independent Bosnian state were the last stretches of land held by Vlatko in Hum. He moved his residence to his last capital Novi and after a few years gave up his peace agreement with the Ottomans. After his marriage in 1474, Vlatko reconciled with his older brother Vladislav. Around the same time, late 1473 to early 1474, his younger brother Stjepan departed for Constantinople, where he converted to Islam as Ahmed Pasha Hercegović, after which he would hold various top positions in his 40-year career, including the highest function in the Ottoman navy.

Just before death of Sultan Mehmed II, Vlatko tried one more push to the heart of Bosnia but was abandoned by his allies. He completely withdrew to his fortress in Novi. The death of Mehmed II prompted the new Sultan Bayezid II to overrun Novi, its harbour and the remaining Bosnian territory. In November 1481, Ajaz-Bey of the Sanjak of Herzegovina besieged Novi but just before 14 December 1481, Vlatko ceased resisting and agreed with the Ottomans to move with his family to Constantinople. Now the entirety of Herzegovina was reorganized into the already established Sanjak of Herzegovina with the seat in Foča, and later, in 1580, would become one of the sanjaks of the Bosnia Eyalet. This signified the disappearance of the last-remaining independent point of the Bosnian state.

== Titles, Ottomans and public relations ==
In the first half of 1448, Stjepan Vukčić, already Duke of Hum and Grand Duke of Bosnia, in an attempt to "bolster his case with the Ottomans", added the title herceg and styled himself Herceg of Hum and the Coast, Grand Duke of Bosnia, Knez of Drina, and the rest, which was first documented in early 1449. In late 1449 or early 1450, he changed it to Herceg of Saint Sava, Lord of Hum, Grand Duke of Bosnia, Knez of Drina, and the rest. This new and unusual style for the herceg part of the title came from the name of Saint Sava, the Serbian saint whose relics were held in Mileševa at the east of Stjepan's province but was unconnected to his religious persuasion; he was a lifelong member of the Bosnian Church.

Not much is known about the circumstances surrounding the new part of the title. Kings Thomas Kotromanić, Frederick III and Alfonso V, as well as the Pope, Venice, and the Ottomans, are all possible bestowers of Stjepan with the title herceg. He probably added the title himself in early October 1448 and received confirmation and recognition from the Ottomans. On 17 October 1448, the people of Dubrovnik congratulated him on "de nova dignitate cherzech acquisita" (transl. acquisitions of the new herceg dignity). At the Hungarian court, Stjepan's latest title was commented on in a less-flattering terms; "if one can be called herceg when the Turks bestowed him with a title", and later, whenever Dubrovnik was in a quarrel with Stjepan, their officials eagerly used this conjecture.

Duke Stjepan was not the first Bosnian nobleman to bear the title of herceg. Another Bosnian magnate, Hrvoje Vukčić, wore the title Herceg of Split, which he received from Ladislav of Naples some half a century earlier. It seems this fact must have left a powerful impression and was constantly on the duke Stjepan's mind, because he at first tried to acquire this exact title, Herceg of Split, from King Alfons V. This kind of internal Bosnian dynamic was met with little or no interest. However, a strict hierarchical order did not allow such "usurpation" to pass unnoticed in medieval Europe. In Bosnia, this event could have passed unnoticed, but a relaxed attitude was usual in the Bosnian political context.

According to medievalists, the move had brought Stjepan considerable public relations value. John V. A. Fine attributed it to fact that Saint Sava's relics were considered miracle-working objects with healing properties by people of all faiths in the region, but probably more importantly, the move signaled alignment with Despot Đurađ—at times Stjepan's only ally during the civil war— and the Ottomans, whose vassal the despot had been. Marko Vego believed that Stjepan, with the title Duke of St. Sava (Ducatus s. Sabbe), raised his and his family's reputation both "inside the Bosnian state and abroad", as did Vladimir Ćorović, who similarly concluded that Stjepan thought he would raise his rank and prestige in this way.

Medievalist Sima Ćirković noted earlier historians harshly criticised Stjepan's subservient relations with the Ottomans, and stated such relations were characteristic of all Bosnian and other Balkan lords at the time; it was practically a norm of that period. Ćirković also writes that Stjepan spent his last few years as a staunch adversary of the Ottomans. He concluded that Stjepan probably wished to emphasise his importance with the Ottoman court, but that adding the new herceg title had hardly more than symbolic significance because Stjepan remained for the rest of his life the Grand Duke of Bosnia. According to historians, Stjepan's acquisition of the title herceg gave the name to a province, becoming one of his enduring legacies.

== Religion ==
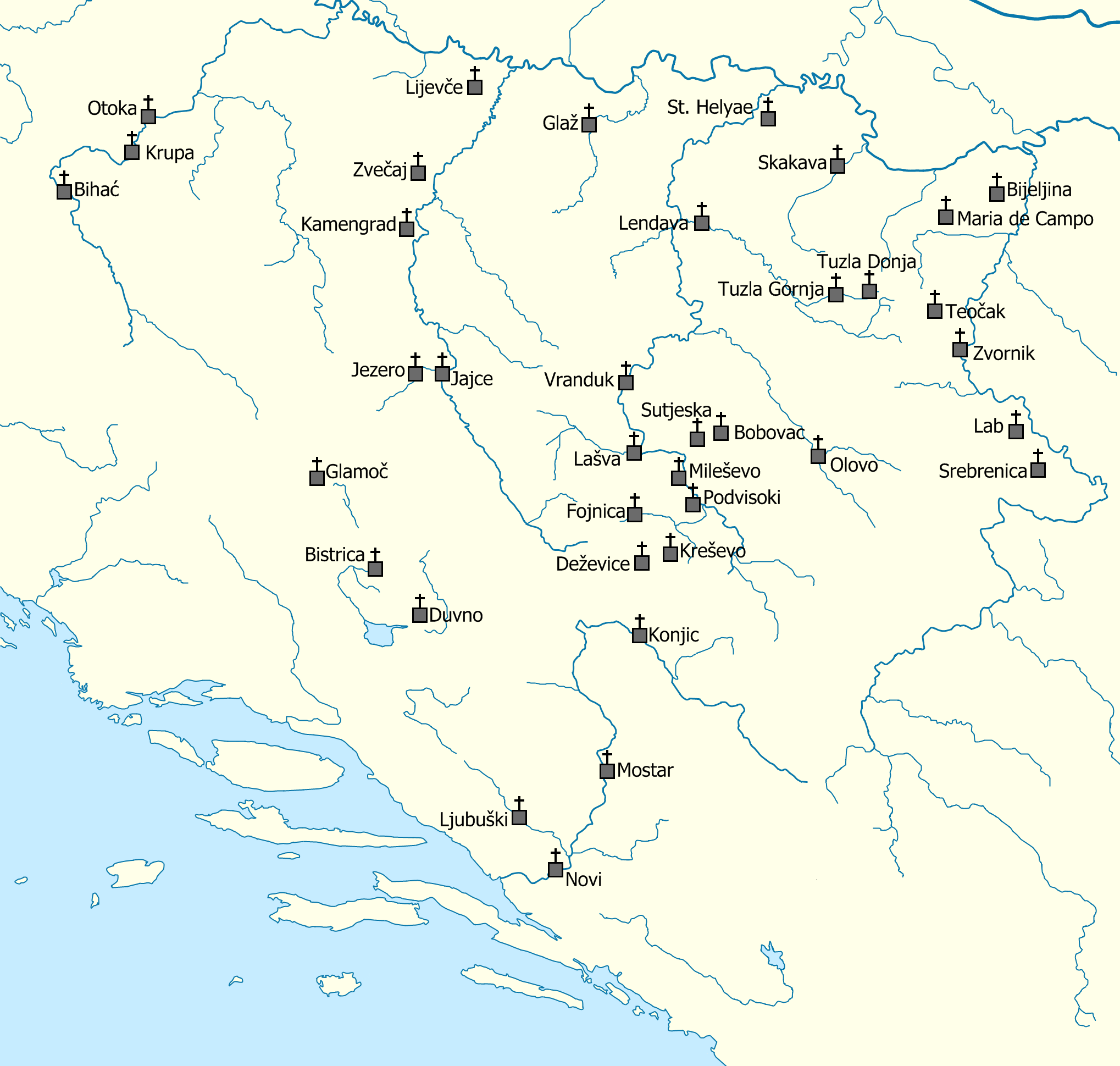
Ubication of Franciscan monasteries in 15th century Bosnia, during Thomas' reign.

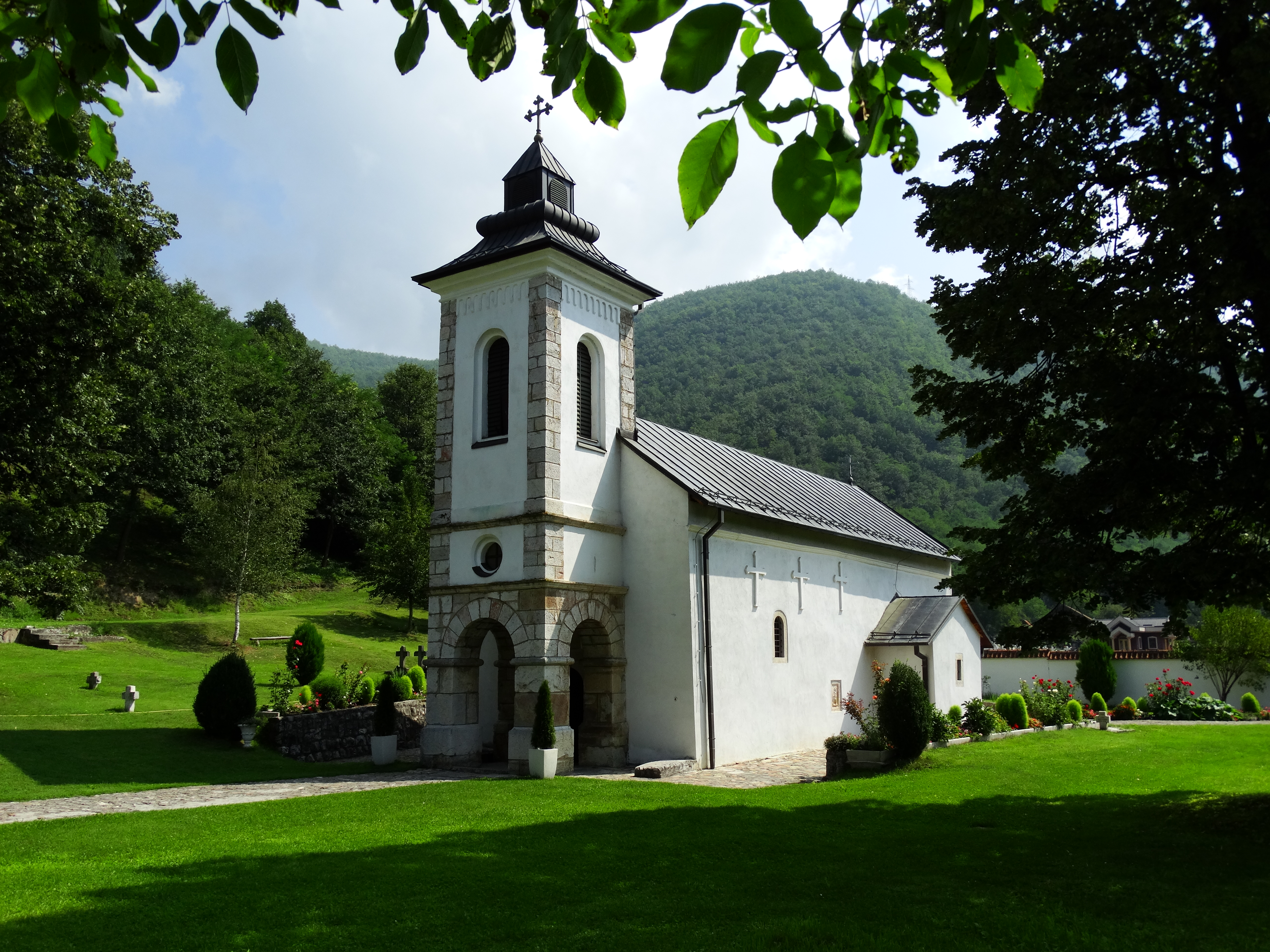
Church of St. George in Sopotnica founded by Stjepan Vukčić.

Like most Bosnian nobleman of the era, Stjepan Vukčić considered himself a staunch Krstjanin, as adherents of the Bosnian Church were known and its members called themselves. His attitude toward the Bosnian Church was highlighted when King Tvrtko II died in September 1443. The events that ensued from Stjepan's refusal to recognise the deceased king's cousin and chosen heir, Thomas, as the new King of Bosnia, created a political crisis that culminated in civil war. Thomas had converted to Roman Catholicism, a move that was catastrophic for the Krstjani and the Bosnian Church. Thomas's decision to convert was a political manoeuvring, albeit founded on sound reasoning, and was intended to save the realm. Thomas committed to demonstrating his devotion by engaging in religious prosecution against his recent fellow coreligionists. These developments prompted Stjepan to give the Krstjanins of the Bosnian Church haven and join the Ottomans in support of Bosnian anti-King Radivoj, Thomas' exiled brother, who remained a Bosnian Church adherent despite Thomas' crusade against the church's adherents.

The Kosača family belonged to the Bosnian Church but were "shaky Christians" like most countrymen. Traditionally, most Bosnians' attitudes towards religion—including those of Stjepan Vukčić—were uncommonly flexible for Europe of the era. As a Krstjanin, Stjepan titled himself after the shrine of an Orthodox saint while maintaining close relations with the papacy. His eldest child Catherine, who had also been a Krstjanka, converted to Roman Catholicism, while his youngest child Stjepan adopted Islam and changed his name to Ahmed after moving to Constantinople in about 1473.

This religious flexibility was highlighted again in 1454, when Duke Stjepan erected an Orthodox church in Goražde. Still, he also requested that a Catholic chapel be included into the church, and before works were finished in early 1455, parvis was built-in left of the altar so that the Herceg’s second wife, Catholic princess Barbara, "daughter of the Most Illustrious Duke of Bavaria" could pray there.

Duke Stjepan also requested Catholic missionaries to be sent from southern Italy to proselytise in Bosnia. He desired to become Catholic, while developing close relations and allying himself with the Ottoman Muslims. The Holy See in the Vatican treated Stjepan as a Catholic. At the same time, simultaneously the Ecumenical Patriarchate of Constantinople considered him Orthodox, but they also laid claims of him being heretic and belonging to the Bosnian Church–the pope IV explicitly accused Herceg of such transgression.

Stjepan was a lifelong protector of the Bosnian Church Krstjani and kept a high-ranking prelate of the Church, a diplomat and ambassador, a well-known and highly influential gost Radin, as his closest adviser at his court. At the end of his life, Stjepan used both gost Radin and priest David, an Orthodox Metropolitan of Mileševa, as his court chaplains, and his chamberlain, Knez Pribislav Vukotić, was a Catholic.

When Herceg Stjepan agreed the peace with his eldest son, his wife, and Hum's nobility after they rebelled against him, the treaty was sealed in a ceremony in front of djed of the Bosnian Church and its 12 clerics, called strojniks headed by gost Radin, who served as witnesses. By the same treaty it was also stipulated that the Herceg must not take any action against any of the nobles outside the family's immediate circle until the suspicions were first checked by the djed of the Bosnian Church, twelve strojniks, among whom a place was again reserved for Radin Gost.

== Land possession ==
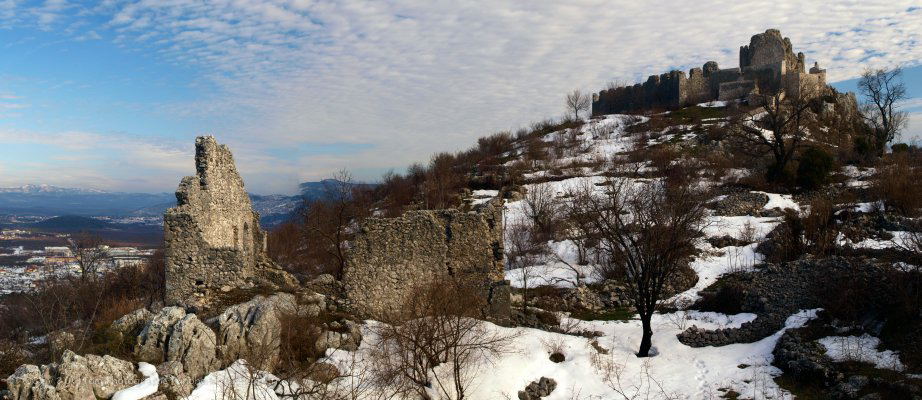
The Ljubuški Fortress was the scene of a family inner confrontation between Herceg Stjepan and his sons, knezs Vlatko and Vladislav.

Around 1450, the possessions of the Kosača family included zemljas and župas: Humska zemlja, Zagorje, Drina, Rudine, Banjani, Trebinje, Upper and Lower Zeta (transl. Gornja i Donja Zeta), Polimlje, Dračevica, Krajina and Poljica on the Cetina. In the early 1460s, just before the fall of the Bosnian Kingdom, Stjepan controlled most of modern-day Herzegovina, at the time Humska zemlja (Hum) including Vitina, as far west as Krajina. However, he had already lost control of many of his lands and towns north of Hum to the Ottomans, namely Zagorje, Drina, Taslidža, Čajniče, Višegrad, Sokol fortress near Šćepan Polje, including Nevesinje and Gacko within Hum.

== Personal life ==
Stjepan Vukčić ancestry tree

Vuk Kosača	unknown
Vlatko Vuković	Hrana Vuković	Anka
Sandalj Hranić	JelenaKatrinaJelena	Vukac Hranić	Katarina	Vuk Hranić
Teodora	Stjepan Vukčić

Stjepan Vukčić was married three times. In 1424, he married Jelena Balšić, daughter of Balša III of Zeta (and granddaughter of his aunt, Jelena Balšić). Jelena died in 1453. Two years later, he married the Catholic princess Barbara, "daughter of the Most Illustrious Duke of Bavaria" (Latin: filia illustris ducis de Payro), probably an illegitimate daughter of Duke Henry XVI. She died in 1459. In 1460, Stjepan was married to a German woman named Cecilie.

=== Issue ===
With his first wife Jelena Balšić, he had at least four children:

- Katarina (1424–1478), in 1446 she married King King Tomaš of Bosnia, and, leaving the Bosnian Church, converted to Catholicism;
- Vladislav Hercegović (c. 1427–1489), Grand Duke of Bosnia, Lord of Krajina, married Kyra Ana, daughter of Georgios Kantakuzenos in 1455;
- Vlatko Hercegović (c. 1428–1489), Herceg of St. Sava, married an Apulian noblewoman;
- Hersekzade Ahmed Pasha (c. 1430–1515), baptised Stjepan; the youngest son of Stjepan Vukčić, whom Sultan Mehmed II took to his court, became a Muslim in the Sultan's service. He became the Grand Vizier and Grand Admiral to the Sultan, married Sultan Bayezid II's daughter, Fatima, in 1482, and had descendants by her.

With his second wife Barbara, he had at least two children:

- son (1456), a short-lived child whose name is not known;
- Mara, daughter.

== Historiography, personality and legacy ==
=== In historiography ===
Herceg Sefan Vukčić Kosača i njegovo doba, by S. Ćirković, 1964 (cover).

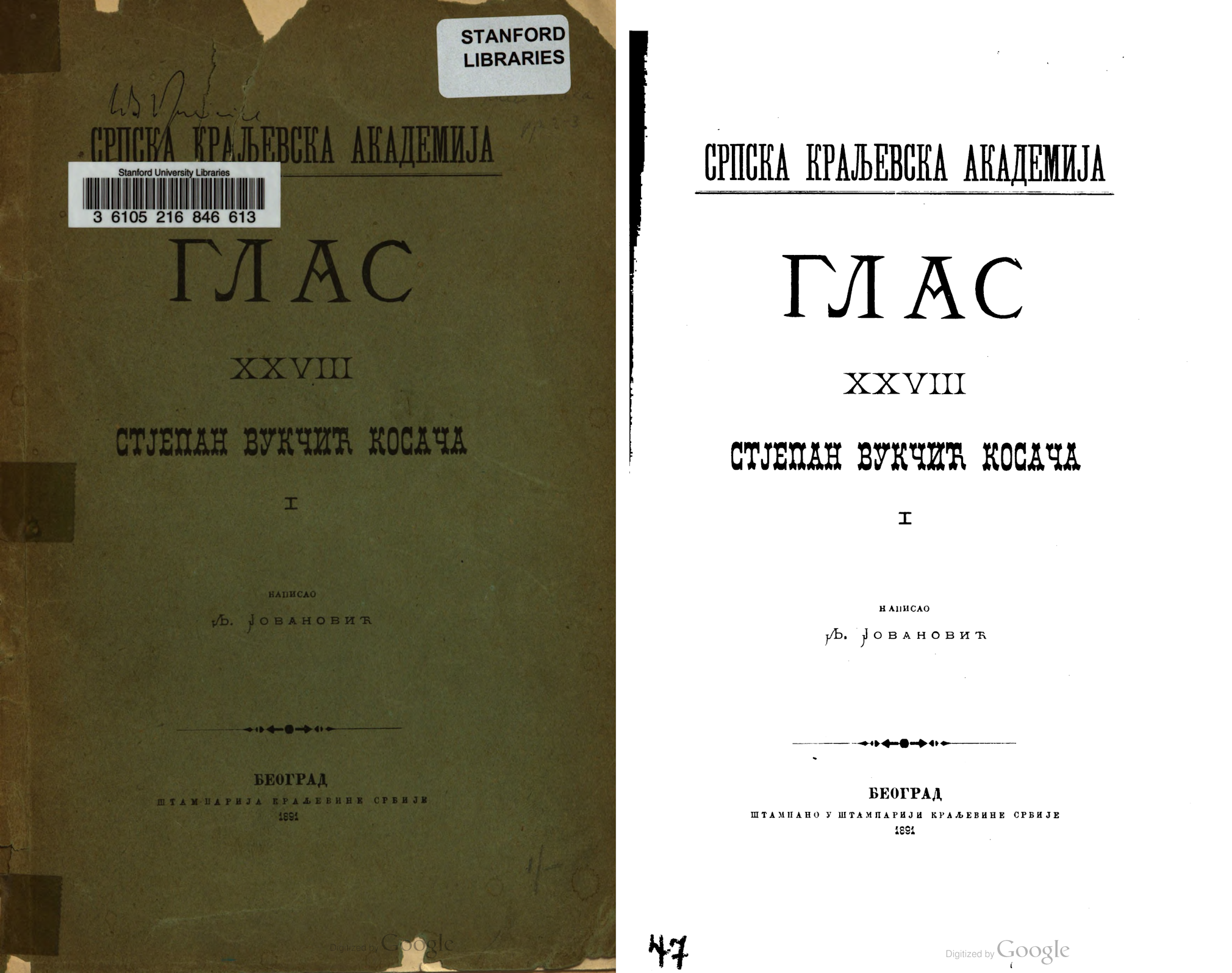
Stjepan Vukčić Kosača, by Lj. Jovanović, 1891 (cover).

Before publication of the historical biography by Sima Ćirković, Herceg Stefan Vukčić-Kosača i njegovo doba (transl. Herceg Stefan Kosača and his time), and despite the large number of archival sources, historiography lacked a critical monograph on Stjepan's life using modern scientific methodology. The Dubrovnik Archive, Venice State Archive, and archives in other Italian cities' archives, including Papal curia, also General Archive of the Crown of Aragon in Barcelona, and one in Buda, Hungary, are sources of information on the political and diplomatic history of the time. Especially valuable are Mavro Orbini's and Jakov Lukarević's first historical works on Stjepan's life and career. These texts were written when the systematic use of archival sources had not yet been utilised.

At the end of the 19th century, Ilarion Ruvarac intended to work on the history of the Kosača family, but the first research was done a few years later by Ljubomir Jovanović, first with War of Duke Stjepan with Dubrovnik and then with the first and incomplete work Stjepan Vukčić Kosača. According to Ćirković, the basic outlines for researching Stjepan's life can be found in Konstantin Jireček's History of Serbs, in which he briefly covers Stjepan's life. In contrast, Vladimir Ćorović's History of Bosnia has a more extensive overview but is insufficiently comprehensive. In 1964, Ćirković published his historical biography Herceg Stefan Vukčić-Kosača i njegovo doba, using his predecessors, and in particular the research of Ilarion Ruvarac, Jakov Lukarević, Lajos Thallóczy, Aleksa Ivić, Mihajlo Dinić, and Vladimir Ćorović.

=== Personality ===
According to Sima Ćirković, assessing information about Stjepan Vukčić Kosača's personality from contemporary documents is unhelpful because they were created under specific circumstances to satisfy political and economic needs, so they are often idiosyncratic and biased. The representation of Stjepan's personality and image based on contemporaneous statements from merchants and ambassadors from Dubrovnik is biased. Accounts arising from contact with Stjepan and depending on the circumstances contained courteous praise of his wisdom, political prudence, law-abiding righteousness, generosity, and fierce condemnation and insult when circumstances demanded it.

The scarcity of sources did not discourage historians whose assessment of Stjepan's character is unflattering Early-modern Dubrovnik historian Jakov Lukarević (fl. 1551–1615) described Stjepan with conspicuous indignation: "He barely knew the letters" and "he was all given over to rage, wine, and living with slave-girls and harlots". Stjepan's "characterization" particularly concerned Medievalist Lajos Thallóczy, who made several harsh assessments; according to him, Stjepan "could have been a model for a Balkan Machiavelli"; "is a typical Balkan knez who can serve as a model"; "we find no ethical features in him, nothing sympathetic, only a marauder"; and "neither his word nor his written promise could be trusted".

Thallóczy's characterisation was taken over by Konstantin Jireček, who added that Stjepan was a "loyal vassal of Porte". He paraphrased Thallóczy, calling Stjepan "cunning, capricious, brutal and a coward, a friend of wine and women, unusually reckless in choosing means, but with a highly developed ability to notice a change in the political circumstance". According to Vladimir Ćorović, Stjepan had "a strong will and a bad temper", "had strength and skills, but no morale", and saying, "since coming to power, he was surprising the world with his ruthlessness, by which he provoked conflicts not only with his neighbours but even in his own family".

Ćirković criticised these descriptions, mainly Thallóczy's, because of his "inherent superficiality and pretentiousness" and based almost entirely on the author's "ideological beliefs [rather] than on a sober examination of the source". He also noted "the historical role of Duke Stjepan in recent historiography is dominated by condemnation for serving the Turks", and that such judgmental assessments never consider many circumstances. Ćirković added: "the common feature of all assessments of Herceg's character is that it was seldom taken into account the extent to which Stjepan's qualities were only his, and not the characteristics of the entire society of that time".

Ćirković concludes, "inversion, treachery, inconsistency cannot be used to characterise any one person from the Bosnian history of the 15th century, because these are characteristics of all feudal lords of that time".

=== Legacy ===
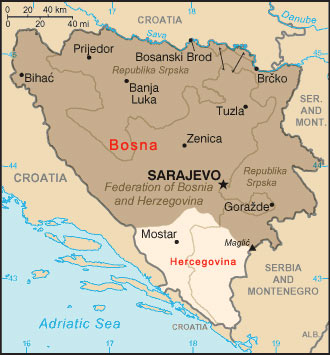
Herzegovina within modern day Bosnia and Herzegovina.

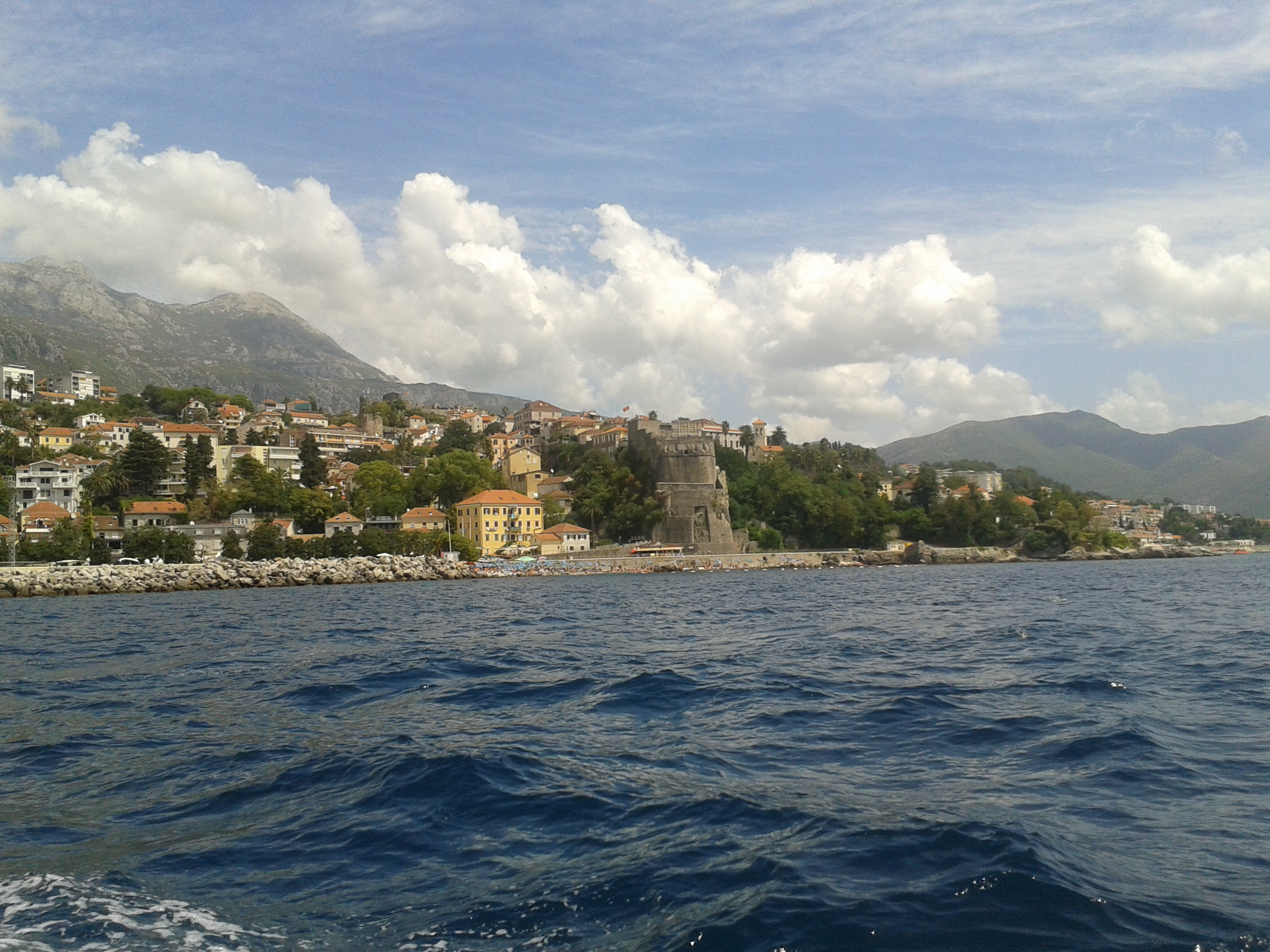
Herceg Novi, old town from the sea, today in Montenegro

The medieval town Novi was founded as a fortress in a small fishing village in 1382 by the first King of Bosnia Tvrtko I Kotromanić, and was initially named Sveti Stefan (Saint Stephen). After the death of Tvrtko, Duke Sandalj Hranić acquired Sveti Stefan. During his reign, the town began trading salt. When Hranić died, his nephew Stjepan Vukčić Kosača inherited it. During his reign, the city grew in importance and became Stjepan's winter seat and was renamed Herceg Novi.

The name "Herzegovina" is the most-important and indelible legacy of Stjepan Vukčić Kosača; it is unique within the Serbo-Croatian-speaking Balkans, because one person gave his noble title, which in the last few years of his life became inseparable from his name, to a region that was previously called Humska zemlja or Hum. Herzegovina still exists with the name Bosnia and Herzegovina.

This is a superficial understanding because the appearance of the name Herzegovina, which is recorded in 1 February 1454 in a letter written by the Ottoman commander Esebeg from Skopje, cannot be attributed to Stjepan alone, and his title was not of decisive importance. More critical is the Ottoman custom of calling newly acquired lands by the names of their earlier rulers. Therefore, it was enough for the Ottomans to conquer Stjepan's land to start calling it Herzegovina. Also, Stjepan did not establish this province as a feudal and political unit of the Bosnian state; that honour befell Grand Duke of Bosnia Vlatko Vuković, who received it from King Tvrtko I; Sandalj Hranić expanded it and reaffirmed the Kosača family's supremacy.

Stjepan is mentioned in Marin Držić's oeuvre, in one replica in the play Džuho Krpeta, performed in 1554 at the feast of Rad Gučetić and Anica Đurđević. It is the most damaged of Držić's manuscripts, which was preserved in the prints made in 1702 by Đuro Matijašević. The replica does not indicate who is saying it. Still, it mentions Bosnian duke: "Brjemena slatka i pritila hercega Stjepana" ("Pregnant sweet and companion of Herceg Stjepan").

== Bibliography ==
- Ančić, Mladen (2001). Na rubu zapada: tri stoljeća srednjovjekovne Bosne [On the brim of the west: three centuries of medieval Bosnia] (in Croatian). Hrvatski institut za povijest. ISBN 9789536491438.
- Babinger, Franz (1992). Mehmed the Conqueror and His Time. USA: Princeton University Press. ISBN 0-691-01078-1.
- Bašagić, Safvet-beg (1900). Kratka uputa u prošlost Bosne i Hercegovine, od g. 1463–1850 [A brief lesson to the past of Bosnia and Herzegovina, from 1463–1850] (in Serbo-Croatian). Vlastita naklada. OCLC 31285183.
- Benson, Robert L. (1978). Viator. Medieval and Renaissance Studies. Vol. 9. University of California Press. ISBN 0-520-03608-5.
- Bešić, Zarije M.; et al. (1970), Istorija Crne Gore / Vol. 2: Crna gora u doba oblasnih gospodara [History of Montenegro / Vol. 2: Montenegro in the time of regional lords] (in Serbo-Croatian), Titograd: Redakcija za istoiju Crne Gore, OCLC 175122851
- Božić, Ivan (1952), Dubrovnik i Turska u XIV i XV veku [Dubrovnik and Turkey in the 14th and 15th centuries] (in Serbo-Croatian), vol. 200 (Posebna izdanja ed.), Belgrade: Naučna knjiga, OCLC 252990068. Via Scribd
- Božić, Jelena (2009). "Prikaz knjige: Srednjovjekovni gradovi u Bosni i Hercegovini Autor: Husref Redžić" [Review: Mediaeval walled towns in Bosnia and Herzegovina Author: Husref Redžić] (pdf). Baština (At ceeol.com) (V). Sarajevo: KONS Commission to preserve national monuments of Bosnia and Herzegovina: 445–452.
- Bury, John Bagnell; Tanner, Joseph Robson; Previté-Orton, Charles William; Brooke, Zachary Nugent, eds. (1923), The Cambridge Medieval History, vol. 4, Cambridge University Press, OCLC 463168558
- Ćirković, Sima (1964a). Herceg Stefan Vukčić-Kosača i njegovo doba [Herceg Stefan Vukčić-Kosača and his time] (in Serbian). Naučno delo SANU. OCLC 4864621.
- Ćirković, Sima (1964). Историја средњовековне босанске државе [History of the medieval Bosnian state] (in Serbian). Srpska književna zadruga. OCLC 494551997.
- Ćorović, Vladimir (1940). Хисторија Босне [History of Bosnia] (in Serbian) (Посебна изданја - Друштбени и историски списи - Књига 53 ed.). Belgrade: Српска краљевска академија – Штамиарија "Слово" (Глас српски – reprint 1999). ISBN 978-86-7119-161-6.
- Ćorović, Vladimir (1997). Istorija srpskog naroda [History of the Serb people] (in Serbian) (Book 1 ed.). Belgrade: eBook Portal. OCLC 494551997.
- Ćošković, Pejo (2009a), Kosača (in Serbo-Croatian), Miroslav Krleža Institute of Lexicography
- Ćošković, Pejo (2009), Kotromanići (in Serbo-Croatian), Miroslav Krleža Institute of Lexicography
- Ćošković, Pejo (2005), Crkva Bosanska u xv. stoljeću [Bosnian Church in the 15th century] (in Serbo-Croatian), vol. Book 2 of Historijske monografije, Sarajevo: Institut za Istoriju, ISBN 9789958964268
- Dželetović, Danilo N. (2007). Istorija i stradanje Hercegove crkve [History and Tribulations of the Herceg's church]. Istočno Sarajevo: Zavod za udžbenike i nastavna sredstva. p. 60. ISBN 978-99955-0-176-1.
- Fine, John Van Antwerp Jr. (1990) [1987]. The Late Medieval Balkans: A Critical Survey from the Late Twelfth Century to the Ottoman Conquest. University of Michigan Press. ISBN 0-472-10079-3.
- Fine, John Van Antwerp Jr. (1994) [1987]. The Late Medieval Balkans: A Critical Survey from the Late Twelfth Century to the Ottoman Conquest. Ann Arbor, Michigan: University of Michigan Press. ISBN 978-0-472-08260-5.
- Fine, John Van Antwerp Jr. (2007). The Bosnian Church: Its Place in State and Society from the Thirteenth to the Fifteenth Century. Saqi. ISBN 978-0-86356-503-8.
- Isailović, Neven (14 December 2020). "Partnerstvo u pokušaju – temeljne značajke odnosa Alfonsa V. i Stjepana Vukčića Kosače". Radovi Zavoda za hrvatsku povijest Filozofskoga fakulteta Sveučilišta u Zagrebu (in Croatian). 52 (3): 37–68. doi:10.17234/RadoviZHP.52.30. ISSN 0353-295X.
- Jovanović, Ljubomir (1891). Стјепан Вукчић Косача. OCLC 829364661.
- Kajmaković, Zdravko (1971). Zidno slikarstvo u Bosni i Hercegovini [Fresco-painting in Bosnia and Herzegovina] (in Serbian). Veselin Masleša. OCLC 5002857.
- Korać, Dijana (2008). Vjera u humskoj zemlji (in Croatian). Crkva na kamenu.
- Korać, Dijana (2015). Religioznost humske vlastele u kasnom srednjem vijeku (in Croatian). Crkva na kamenu. ISBN 978-9958-1918-3-1.
- Kurtović, Esad (2010). "Sandalj Hranić Kosača – Biography of the Bosnian Magnate". Bosna Franciscana (in Bosnian) (33). CEEOL. ISSN 1330-7487.
- Kurtović, Esad (2009). Sandalj Hranić Kosača – Biografija bosanskog vlastelina [Sandalj Hranić Kosača – Biography of a Bosnian nobleman]. Historijske monografije (in Bosnian). Vol. 4. Sarajevo: Institut za istoriju. ISBN 978-9958-649-01-1.
- Kurtović, Esad (2009b), Hranić (in Serbo-Croatian), Miroslav Krleža Institute of Lexicography
- Kurtović, Esad (2019). Kratka historija srednjovjekovne Bosne [A short history of medieval Bosnia] (in Bosnian). Sarajevo: Autorsko izdanje. ISBN 978-9926-466-65-7.
- Lovrenović, Dubravko (2008), Church of Saint George in Sopotnica, the architectural ensemble, Bosnia and Herzegovina Commission to Preserve National Monuments
- Ljubez, Bruno (2009), Jajce Grad: prilog povijesti posljednje bosanske prijestolnice [Jajce City: a contribution to the history of the last Bosnian capital] (in Serbo-Croatian), HKD Napredak, ISBN 9789958840456
- Maglajlić, Munib, ed. (2005). "Naučni skup Herceg Stjepan Vukčić Kosača i njegovo doba". Zbornik radova sa naučnog skupa [Proceedings from Scientific conference Mostar 23 May 2003] (in Bosnian). Mostar: BZK Preporod, Gradsko društvo Mostar. WorldCat.org. ISBN 9958-9457-5-4. OCLC 500028137.
  - Ćošković, Pejo. "Veze hercega Stjepana s Katoličkom Crkvom [Hezeg Stjepan's ties with the Catholic Church]". In Maglajlić (2005), pp. 99–128.
  - Kurtović, Esad. "Stjepan Vukčić Kosača u ulaganju novca na dobit u Dubrovniku [Stjepan Vukčić Kosača in investing money for profit in Dubrovnik]". In Maglajlić (2005), pp. 129–142.
  - Maglajlić, Munib. "Neka književna svjedočenja o Kosačama [Some oral and written legacy about Kosače]". In Maglajlić (2005), pp. 149–154.
- Mandić, Dominik (1978), Sabrana djela Dr. O. Dominika Mandića: Bosna i Hercegovina: povjesno kritička istraživanja [Collected works of Dr. Father Dominik Mandić: Bosnia and Herzegovina: Historically-Critical Research], Zajednica izdanja ranjeni labud, OCLC 462782159
- Miller, William (1923), The Cambridge Medieval History, Volume 4, Cambridge University Press
- Miller, William (1921), Essays On The Latin Orient, Cambridge University Press, ISBN 9781117905761
- Miller, Timothy S.; Nesbitt, John W., eds. (1995), Peace and war in Byzantium: essays in honor of George T. Dennis, S.J, The Catholic University of America Press, ISBN 0-8132-0805-X
- Nakaš, Lejla (2011), Konkordancijski rječnik ćirilskih povelja srednjovjekovne Bosne [Concordance Dictionary of Cyrillic Charters of Medieval Bosnia] (in Bosnian) (Posebna izdanja, knjiga X, svezak 1 ed.), Društvo za proučavanje srednjovjekovne bosanske historije, OCLC 1166792149
- Pinson, Mark (1996). The Muslims of Bosnia-Herzegovina: their historic development from the Middle Ages to the dissolution of Yugoslavia. Harvard CMES. ISBN 978-0-932885-12-8.
- Redžić, Husref (2009). Srednjovjekovni gradovi u Bosni i Hercegovini. Sarajevo: Biblioteka Kulturno naslijeđe Bosne i Hercegovine, Sarajevo Publishing. p. 266. ISBN 9789958215117.
- Spremić, Momčilo (2005). Balkanski vazali kralja Alfonsa Aragonskog [Balkan vassals of King Alfonso of Aragon]. Beograd: Prekinut uspon.
- Vasić, Milan (1995). Bosna i Hercegovina od srednjeg veka do novijeg vremena: međunarodni naučni skup 13–15. decembar 1994 [Bosnia and Herzegovina from the Middle Ages to Recent Times: An International Scientific Conference]. Istorijski institut SANU. ISBN 9788677430078.
- Vego, Marko (1957). Naselja bosanske srednjevjekovne države [Settlements of the Bosnian medieval state] (in Serbo-Croatian). Sarajevo: Svjetlost. OCLC 9379295.
- Vego, Marko (1982). Postanak srednjovjekovne bosanske države [The becoming of the medieval Bosnian state] (in Serbo-Croatian). Sarajevo: Svjetlost. OCLC 461824314.
- Vrankić, Petar (5 October 2017). "Stjepan/Ahmedpaša Hercegović (1456.?-1517.) u svjetlu dubrovačkih, talijanskih i osmanskih izvora". Hercegovina: Časopis za kulturno i povijesno naslijeđe (in Croatian) (3): 9–67. doi:10.47960/2712-1844.2017.3.9. ISSN 2566-3429.
- Šanjek, Franjo, ed. (2005). Fenomen "Krstjani" u Srednjovjekovnoj Bosni i Humu: Zbornik Radova (in Serbo-Croatian). Sarajevo: Institut za istoriju u Sarajevu. ISBN 978-9985-9642-5-5.
  - Puljić, Ivica. "Crkvene prilike u zemljama Hercega Stjepana Vukčića Kosače [Confessional circumstances in the lands of Herceg Stjepan Vukčić Kosača]". In Šanjek (2005), pp. 239–269.
