= Ključ, Gacko =

Village in Bosnia and Herzegovina

Ključ Кључ
- Village
- Location within Bosnia and Herzegovina
- Coordinates: 43°05′35″N 18°29′38″E
- Country: Bosnia and Herzegovina
- Entity: Republika Srpska
- Municipality: Gacko
- Time zone: UTC+1 (CET)
  - Summer (DST): UTC+2 (CEST)

Ključ (Serbian Cyrillic: Кључ) is a village in the municipality of Gacko, Republika Srpska, Bosnia and Herzegovina.

== Geography ==
The Village is located southwest of Gacko. It is separated from Gatačko polje by the Baba mountain (1,737 m). This mountain borders the Ključ-Cernik valley from the north, and Kamno brdo from the south. Considering that the mentioned hills protect the valley, the climate here is milder than in other areas in Gatačko polje and around Gacko. There are also several springs in Kljuc.

== History ==
=== Middle Ages ===
The settlement has a historical area - the Old Town of Ključ and the Ključ Mosque (Ajnebeg-dede Mosque, the Mosque of Ključ Captains or Starica) with a harem in Ključ, which has been declared a national monument of Bosnia and Herzegovina. In 1373, the Serbian prince Lazar Hrebeljanović and the Bosnian ban Tvrtko divided the lands of Nikola Altomanović. In that division, the area of Gacko belonged to the Bosnian ban Tvrtko. The first written document in which the town of Ključ is mentioned in the charter of Sandalj Hranić from 28 December 1410. In a broader sense, the suburb of Ključ was Cernica, which developed from a caravan station into a square with a customs house.

=== Ottoman period ===
In 1463, the town of Ključ was attacked and captured by the Ottomans. It finally came under Turkish rule in 1468. After the peace was signed in Sremski KarlovciIn 1699, Ključ became the seat of the captaincy, which occupied the largest parts of the territory of today's municipalities of Gacko and Bileća, and coincided with the territory of the Cernički kadiluk.

=== Modern history ===
The fortification in Ključ was abandoned before the Austro-Hungarian occupation. Ključ, and wider Bosnia was annexed by Austria 1878, when Austrian troops entered this area, however, the region had been under habsburg spare of influence for some time. Following World War I, Bosnia and Herzegovina joined the South Slav Kingdom of Serbs, Croats and Slovenes (soon renamed Yugoslavia). Once the Kingdom of Yugoslavia was conquered by German forces in World War II, all of Bosnia was ceded to the Nazi puppet regime, the Independent State of Croatia (NDH) led by the Ustaše. At the end of the war, the establishment of the Socialist Federal Republic of Yugoslavia, with the constitution of 1946, officially made Bosnia and Herzegovina one of six constituent republics in the new state.

On 18 November 1990, multi-party parliamentary elections were held throughout Bosnia and Herzegovina. A second round followed on 25 November, resulting in a national assembly where communist power was replaced by a coalition of three ethnically-based parties. Following Slovenia and Croatia's declarations of independence from Yugoslavia, a significant split developed among the residents of Bosnia and Herzegovina on the issue of whether to remain within Yugoslavia (overwhelmingly favored by Serbs) or seek independence (overwhelmingly favored by Bosniaks and Croats). A declaration of the sovereignty of Bosnia and Herzegovina on 15 October 1991 was followed by a referendum for independence on 29 February and 1 March 1992, which was boycotted by the great majority of Serbs. The region eastern Herzegovina found itself under the control Republika Srpska during the war.

== Ethnic composition ==
Ethnic composition – Ključ
	2013.	1991.	1981.	1971.
Total	39 (100.0%)	78 (100.0%)	139 (100.0%)	241 (100.0%)
Bosniaks	38 (97.44%)	78 (100.0%)	133 (95.68%)	239 (99.17%)
Serbs			1 (0.719%)	1 (0.415%)
Yugoslavs			5 (3.597%)	
Croats				
Montenegrins				
Muslum	1 (2.564%)			
Other				1 (0.415%)
