= Ključ Castle (Gacko) =

Medieval castle in Ključ near Gacko, Bosnia and Herzegovina

Ključ
- Ključ; Bosnia and Herzegovina
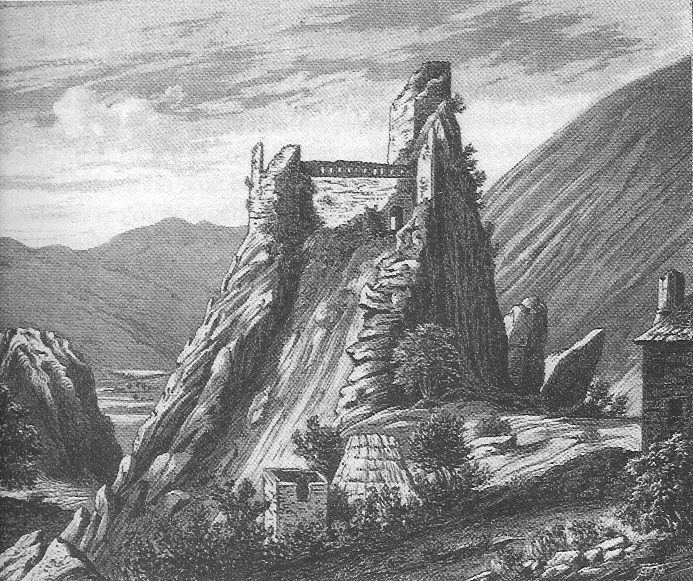
- A 19th century engraving of an idealised historical view of the castle, found in János Asbóth's travelog "Bosznia és a Hercegovina", 1884 (artist unknown).

Site information
- Type: town-fortress
- Owner: The Government of Bosnia and Herzegovina
- Condition: Ruin

Location
- Location within Bosnia and Herzegovina
- Coordinates: 43.093401°N 18.488900°E

Site history
- Built: Unknown-12th century
- Built by: (unknown)
- In use: Until 1918
- Materials: limestone in dry stone walling
- Battles/wars: Siege of Ključ (1469)

Garrison information
- Designations

KONS of Bosnia and Herzegovina
- Official name: Old Ključ fort and the Ključ mosque (mosque of Ajnebeg dede, mosque of the Ključ captains or Starica) with harem in Ključ, the historic site
- Type: Category II monument
- Criteria: A, B, C iv.vi., D i.ii.iv, E ii.iii.v., F ii., G i.ii.iii.v.vi., H i.
- Designated: 28 June 2005 (?th session)
- Reference no.: 2565
- Decision no.: . 05.2-2-165/05-4

Ključ fortrass, locally known as Stari grad Ključ (transl. Old Town Ključ), is a medieval castle complex in the village of Ključ, Gacko, Bosnia and Herzegovina. The historic area includes the Ključ fortress, the Podključ castle town (in Serbo-Croatian: podgrađe, lit. transl. below-town or under-town) as part of a wider area just beneath of the fortress, the Ključ Mosque (Ajnebeg-dede Mosque, Ključ Captains' Mosque or Starica) with a harem. The site has been declared a National monument of Bosnia and Herzegovina by the Commission to preserve national monuments of Bosnia and Herzegovina.

== Location ==
Ključ medieval castle complex is located in the village of Ključ, northeastern Herzegovina, in the Republika Srpska entity of Bosnia and Herzegovina. The remains of Ključ are located on the extreme southwestern slope of the Babe mountain, under Rudi brdo (1,167 m). The Ključ mosque is located on a prominent hill, in a locality called Begova bašča, and is fifty meters away from the Old Town of Ključ.

== History ==
The date of the construction is unknown, however by 1426 the site was used as a regional powerbase and 'capital' of the Grand Duke Sandalj Ključ, which translates as Key, was the residence of Sandalj Hranić, the most powerful Bosnian nobleman in the region during the period, and one of his most important fortified cities. Holding the title Grand Duke of Bosnia, it was from Ključ he issued the most charters. Sandalj's successor, Stjepan Vukčić Kosača, often stayed in Ključ and received missions, although by then Ključ had fallen out of favour.

Ključ is mentioned in August 1434 in one lawsuit, where it is referred to as 'The place of the robbery is the suburb of the castrum called Ključ' (subtus unum castrum vocatum Cluz) Radonja Ratković died under the town of Ključ for his master, Duke Sandalj Hranić, recorded and inscribed on his Stećak. Under Ključ there was a market in which economic life in the air was organized. Although previously implied, it was explicitly mentioned in mid-February 1449. At that time, Radassin Stanchouich de Sotocliuç undertook a four-year service and studied crafts with the weaver Vlakota Mihačević. It is not explained why Ključ is not mentioned in the first charter of the Aragonese-Neapolitan king Alfonso from 1444 when the estates of Stjepan Kosača are confirmed. The fortress is mentioned as Glutsch in 1448, and as the name Cluz cum castris et partinentiis suis, in 1454. Supervising the neighbouring Cernica (an old settlement from the time of the Roman Empire), the city observed the movement of the most important trade route, Dubrovnik-Goražde.

Stjepan Tomašević succeeded his father on the throne of Bosnia following the latter's death in July 1461 and became the first Bosnian (and last) king to receive a crown from the Holy See. Under Tomašević, Bosnia was left to fend for itself by his senior, Matthias Corvinus, who held nominal rule of Bosnia, and by other European powers. By now the growing power of the Ottoman's could not be ignored. After Tomašević's fall in 1463, herceg Stjepan Vukčić, lord of the Hum province in the south of the kingdom, lived for another three years, enough to see kingdom's complete demise, for which he blamed his eldest son Vladislav Hercegović. Among with 'most' of Herzegovina residences, Ključ survived the longest under Ottoman siege. Thus, the incursion of Ottoman mobile troops was thwarted in July 1463, by a new and short annexation to the Duke's territory. At the end of 1465, Kosača asked the government of Dubrovnik for emergency supplies and support for the besieged fortress. Fearing retaliation, their request was denied and addressed to Hungarian commanders. The Herzog's son Vlatko directly took control of Ključ from 1464 to 1468. On 21 May 1466, an old and terminally ill duke Stjepan dictated his last words, recorded in a testament, and bypassing Vladislav he condemned him by saying that it was him who "brought the great Turk to Bosnia to the death and destruction of us all". The next day duke died. In 1469 the fortress fell to the governor of the Herzegovina Ajas Pasha. Vlatko tried one more push to the heart of Bosnia, however now abandoned by his allies his venture ended in disaster, after which he completely and finitely withdraw to his fortress in Novi. After the fall of the Kingdome, the fortress lost its strategic importance and began to fall into ruin. In the 16th century, several foreigners, including Venetian Benedetto Ramberti in 1533 travelled from Dubrovnik via Ključ, and noted the fortress was destroyed.

Before the Austro-Hungarian annexation in 1878, the role of Ključ had been taken over by the newly built town of Koriti.

== Architecture ==
The position of the walls is limited by limestone boulders at the junction of the outer rampart, while the rocky terrain protects the eastern rampart of the upper town to the extreme. It has an entrance with door frames 1.70 metres (5.6 ft) high and 0.80 metres (2.6 ft) wide. The terrain is levelled in front of the lower threshold, and above it are the steps for the exit to the guard path. The interior encloses a courtyard space of 51 metres (167 ft) by 19.2 metres (63 ft) and on the highest ridge rises the main tower of a quadrangular base, 8 metres (26 ft) by 8 metres (26 ft) with a wall 1.80 metres (5.9 ft) thick. South of the main entrance is a square tower 7 metres (23 ft) by 40 metres (130 ft) that served as a dungeon. With walls 0.80 metres (2.6 ft)-1 metre (3.3 ft) wide, with a supervised secret exit for the lower town. Above the northeastern ramparts, cannon openings and numerous loopholes can be seen. On the walls of the main tower, a much smaller number of openings for firearms and cold steel can be seen. Perhaps the most important description of the city's architecture is the outer rampart of the upper town, about 7 metres (23 ft) high and up to 3.50 metres (11.5 ft) wide, unusual for medieval Bosnian towns. Access to the main entrance of the upper town was made through a side wall 2 metres (6.6 ft) and 1.40 metres (4.6 ft). Along with it, the remains of an unidentified residential building on the way to the dungeon can be recognized. With Herzegovina's rule, Kljuc lost its political role, but its strategic and economic value grow. Then the walls were reinforced with a medieval opus incertum filled with trpanca in lime mortar.

== Current state ==
Immediately after 1878, engineer Hugo Jedlička researched Ključ. Leading archaeological excavations, he transferred two cannons to the National Museum in Sarajevo. On the hill Ćućenica south of the city there are stećak tombstones from the medieval period, some of which have been transferred to the National Museum. Today, the castle is a ruin.

== Bibliography ==
- Hamdija Kreševljaković and Hamdija Kapidžić - Old Herzegovinian Cities, Naše starine II, Sarajevo, 1954.
- Husref Redzic, 2009 - Medieval cities in Bosnia and Herzegovina
- Marko Vego, Zbornik srednjovjekovnih natpisa Bosne i Hercegovine, Knjiga III, Zemaljski muzej, Sarajevo 1964, 32–33.
