= Srebrenica Fortress =

- Srebrenica; Bosnia and Herzegovina
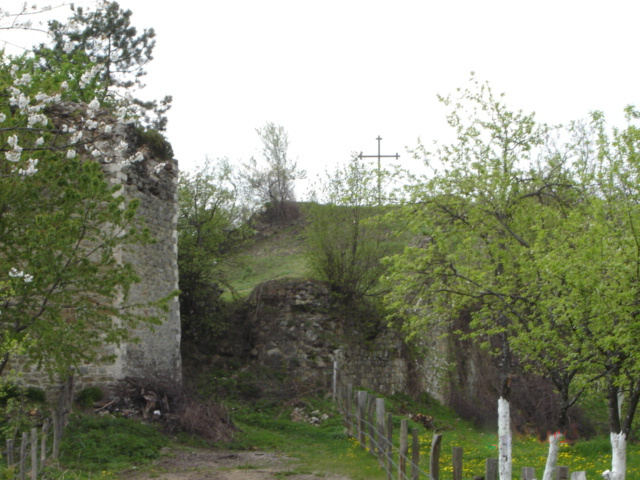

Site information
- Type: town-fortress
- Owner: The Government of Bosnia and Herzegovina
- Condition: Ruin

Location
- Coordinates: 44°06′04″N 19°18′10″E

Site history
- Built: Unknown-- Middle Ages
- Built by: (unknown)
- In use: Until 17th century
- Materials: limestone in dry stone walling
- Battles/wars: Bosnia-Serbia War (first half of the 16th c.)

Garrison information
- Designations

KONS of Bosnia and Herzegovina
- Official name: Lower Fort in Srebrenica, the historic site
- Type: Category II monument
- Criteria: A, B, C iv.vi., D i.ii.iv, E ii.iii.v., F ii., G i.ii.iii.v.vi., H i.
- Designated: 8 November 2006 (?th session No.05.2-2-104/04-6)
- Reference no.: 2903
- List of National Monuments of Bosnia and Herzegovina

The Strebrenica Fortress is located in Srebrenica, Bosnia and Herzegovina. It dates back to medieval times and was still in use at the end of the 17th century. It is included in the list of National Monuments of Bosnia and Herzegovina.

== See also ==
- History of Bosnia and Herzegovina
- Fortresses of Bosnia and Herzegovina
