= Jeleč, Foča =

Jeleč
- Village
- Location within Bosnia and Herzegovina
- Coordinates: 43°29′36″N 18°36′56″E
- Country: Bosnia and Herzegovina
- Time zone: UTC+1 (CET)
  - Summer (DST): UTC+2 (CEST)

Jeleč is a village in the municipality of Foča, Bosnia and Herzegovina.
