= Kamno Brdo =

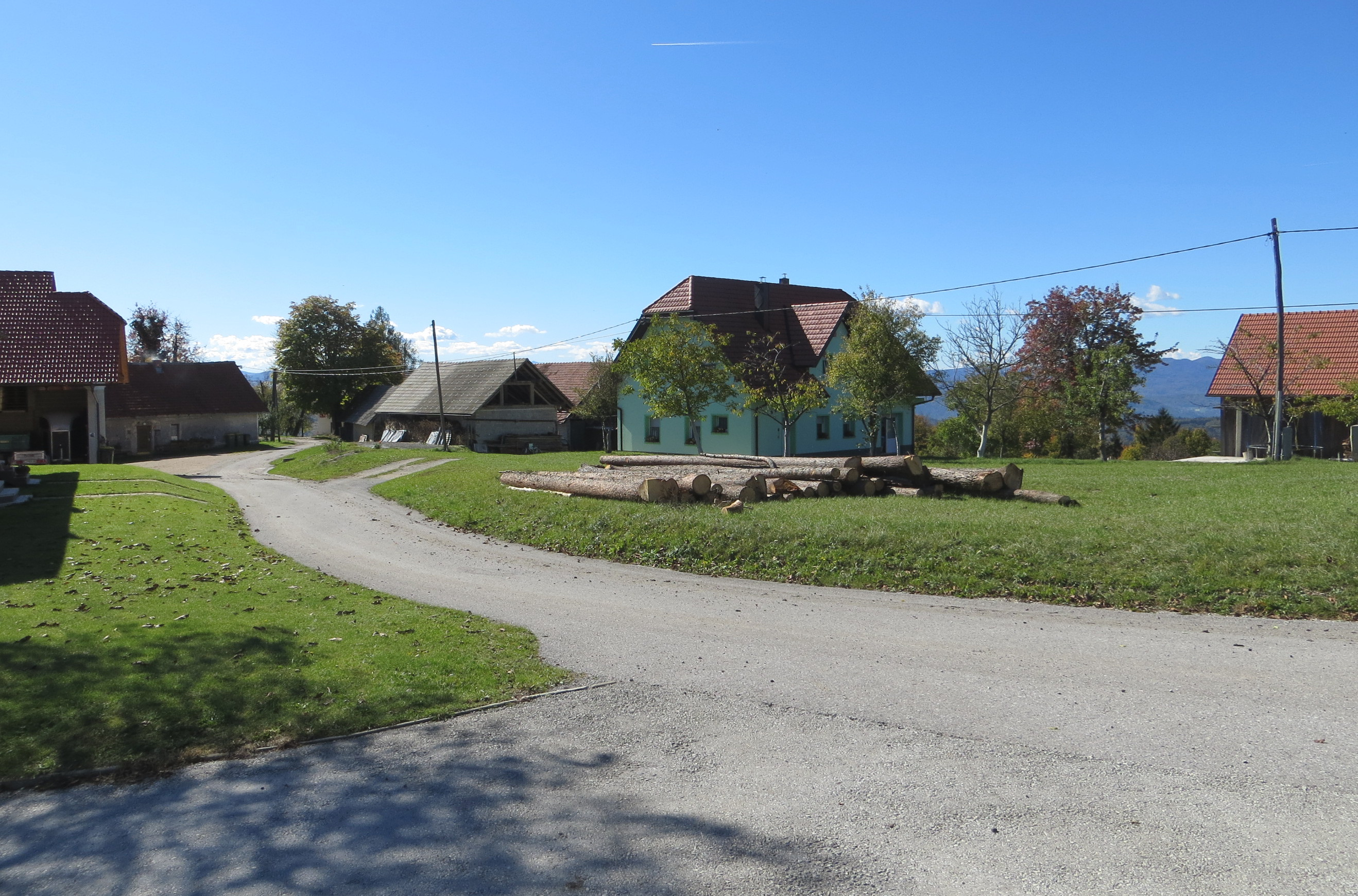

- Location in Slovenia
- Coordinates: 45°58′6.07″N 14°45′48.04″E
- Country: Slovenia
- Traditional region: Lower Carniola
- Statistical region: Central Slovenia
- Municipality: Ivančna Gorica

Area
  - Total: 0.7 km^{2} (0.27 sq mi)
- Elevation: 629.6 m (2,066 ft)

Population (2002)
  - Total: 11

Kamno Brdo (pronounced [ˈkaːmnɔ ˈbəɾdɔ]; German: Kamenwerch) is a small settlement in the hills above Višnja Gora in the Municipality of Ivančna Gorica in central Slovenia. The area is part of the historical region of Lower Carniola and is now included in the Central Slovenia Statistical Region.
