= Batić Mirković =

15th century Bosnian nobleman

Gospodin Batić Mirković Veliki Knez Bosanski [Grand Knyaz of Bosnia]
- Predecessor: Mirko Radojević
- Native name: Batić Mirković
- Known for: witness in charters
- Buried: near Kopošići; 44.004167°N 18.345115°E
- Residence: Kopošići
- Locality: Ljubina
- Noble family: Radojević-Mirković
- Father: Mirko Radivojević
- Mother: Vukosava

Batić Mirković (Serbian Cyrillic: Батић Мирковић) was a prominent 15th century Bosnian nobleman and magnate. His father was Bosnian knez, Mirko Radojević, the Radojević-Mirković noble family senior, who had a brother Radič Radojević. Batić succeeded as a head of the family and Bosnian knez after his father death, while he also succeeded Radoje Radosalić-Pribinić of his grandfather, as Grand Knez of Bosnia. He was married to Vukava.

Knez Batić Mirković can be traced in three places in diplomatic material, on charters as a witness in the period 1405–1420. In June 1405, in Bijela Selišta in Trstivnica, the Bosnian king Tvrtko II Tvrtković issued a charter to the people of Dubrovnik confirming cession of the Slano littoral, and among the witnesses to this act (with the elected nobleman and nobles of the Bosnian Rusag) was Knez Batić Mirković. This could mean that his father dead and that he has taken his place. His next mention is from the beginning of March 1419, in charter written in Zvečaj, when the Bosnian king Stjepan Ostojić confirmed pledges to Dubrovnik in the charters of his predecessors. Among the witnesses is Knez Batić. The last mention in the diplomatic material is from August 1420. Tvrtko II confirms Sandalj's contract with Dubrovnik, regarding selling of Konavle to the city-republic, in charter written in Podvisoko, and among the witnesses is Knez Batić Mirković. The information from the charters show that Batić Mirković was indeed a respectable person, a lord who was among the most important nobles of medieval Bosnia at the beginning of the 15th century.

Another piece of important information about Batić Mirković comes from his stećak tombstone. His stećak is preserved in the necropolis of the village of Kopošići, in the municipality of Ilijaš. According to the inscription on his stećak, it is known that his title was in fact the Knez of Bosnia and that he was associated with the fortified town of Visoki. The inscription states that he fell ill in Visoko, and that death found him "at Duboko". According to the inscription, the stećak was placed and inscribed by his wife Vukava. The stećak tombstone of Batić Mirković is considered one of the most beautiful among the preserved stećaks. The stećak and the tomb were the subject of numerous looting, devastation and displacement, mostly during the late 19th century.

Archaeological excavations were undertaken in 2015. Findings included remains of a fine funerary shroud, made of brocade embroidered with fine threads of gilded silver, covering partly preserved skeletal remains, that could be relevant for further analysis. In 2021 were genetically analyzed his skeletal remains and of near unidentified adult individual, showing the same Y-DNA haplotype and almost identical autosomal DNA haplotype, indicating "high probability of father–son relation", theorized to be remains of his father Mirko Radojević.

The place of the stećak tombstone and the tomb of the Bosnian Knez Batić Mirković is in close proximity to the fortified city of Dubrovnik, which, like the surrounding estates in the Misoča river basin, is considered his noble heritage.

Both, medieval necropolis and the Dubrovnik Castle, are protected national monument of Bosnia and Herzegovina, by the decision of the Commission to Preserve National Monuments of Bosnia and Herzegovina from 2003.

== Bibliography ==
- Ljubomir Stojanović, Старе српске повеље и писма, I/1, Srpska kraljevska akademija, Zbornik za istoriju, jezik i književnost srpskog naroda, prvo odeljenje, Spomenici na srpskom jeziku 19, Beograd - Sremski Karlovci 1929,
- Nekropola kneza Batića
- Nadgorbni spomenik kneza Batića
- Posjeta nekropoli stećaka u Kopošićima
- Stećci u Kopošićima
- Utvrđeni gradovi srednjovjekovne Bosne,
