= Donje Selo =

Donje Selo may refer to the following places:

- Donje Selo (Goražde) in Bosnia and Herzegovina
- Donje Selo (Ilijaš) in Bosnia and Herzegovina
- Donje Selo (Konjic) in Bosnia and Herzegovina
- Donje Selo, Danilovgrad in Montenegro
- Donje Selo, Primorje-Gorski Kotar County, a village near Mošćenička Draga, Croatia
- Donje Selo, Split-Dalmatia County, a village on the island of Šolta, Croatia
