= Radio Kakanj =

Bosnian radio station

Kakanj; Bosnia and Herzegovina
- Broadcast area: Zenica-Doboj Canton
- Frequency: Kakanj 87.9 MHz

Programming
- Language: Bosnian language
- Format: Local news, talk and music

History
- First air date: April 27, 1992; 2000

Technical information
- Licensing authority: CRA BiH
- Transmitter coordinates: 44°07′52″N 18°05′50″E
- Repeater: Kakanj/Plandište

Links
- Webcast: Listen Live
- Website: radiokakanj.co.ba

Radio Kakanj is a Bosnian local commercial radio station, broadcasting from Kakanj, Bosnia and Herzegovina. This radio station broadcasts a variety of programs such music and local news.

When war in Bosnia and Herzegovina started, Radio Kakanj was founded on 27 April 1992 as local/municipal public radio station. In 2000, radio station was re-registered in Communications Regulatory Agency of Bosnia and Herzegovina as private, commercial radio station.

Program is mainly produced in Bosnian language at one FM frequency (Kakanj 87.9 MHz) and it is available in the city of Kakanj as well as in nearby municipalities in Zenica-Doboj Canton and Sarajevo Canton area.

Estimated number of listeners of Radio Kakanj is around 27.221. Radio Kakanj is also available via internet and via IPTV platform in BiH (Moja TV - Channel 240).

== Frequencies ==
- Kakanj 87.9 MHz

== See also ==
- List of radio stations in Bosnia and Herzegovina
- Radio Visoko
- Radio Breza
- Radio Ilijaš
- Radio Zenica
- Radio Vogošća
