= Kadarići =

Kadarići may refer to the following villages in Bosnia and Herzegovina:

- Kadarići (Ilijaš), in the Sarajevo Canton
- Kadarići (Vareš), in the Zenica-Doboj Canton
