= Radio Breza =

Bosnian radio station

Breza; Bosnia and Herzegovina
- Broadcast area: Zenica-Doboj Canton
- Frequency: Breza 100.1 MHz

Programming
- Language: Bosnian language
- Format: Local news, talk and music

History
- First air date: July 8, 1992; 2000

Technical information
- Licensing authority: CRA BiH
- Transmitter coordinates: 44°01′16″N 18°15′40″E
- Repeater: Breza/Kolovaj

Links
- Webcast: Listen Live
- Website: www.radiobreza.com.ba

Radio Breza is a Bosnian local commercial radio station, broadcasting from Breza, Bosnia and Herzegovina. This radio station broadcasts a variety of programs such as folk and pop music with local news.

When war in Bosnia and Herzegovina started, Radio Breza was founded on 8 July 1992 as local/municipal public radio station. In 2000, radio station was re-registered in Communications Regulatory Agency of Bosnia and Herzegovina as private, commercial radio station.

Program is mainly produced in Bosnian language at one FM frequency (Breza 100.1 MHz) and it is available in the city of Breza as well as in nearby municipalities in Zenica-Doboj Canton and Sarajevo Canton area.

Estimated number of listeners of Radio Breza is around 54.007. Radio Breza is also available via internet and via CATV platform in BiH (Telemach - Channel 634).

== Frequencies ==
- Breza 100.1 MHz

== See also ==
- List of radio stations in Bosnia and Herzegovina
- Radio Visoko
- Radio Kakanj
- Radio Ilijaš
- Radio Zenica
- Radio Vogošća
