= Taračin Do =

- Village
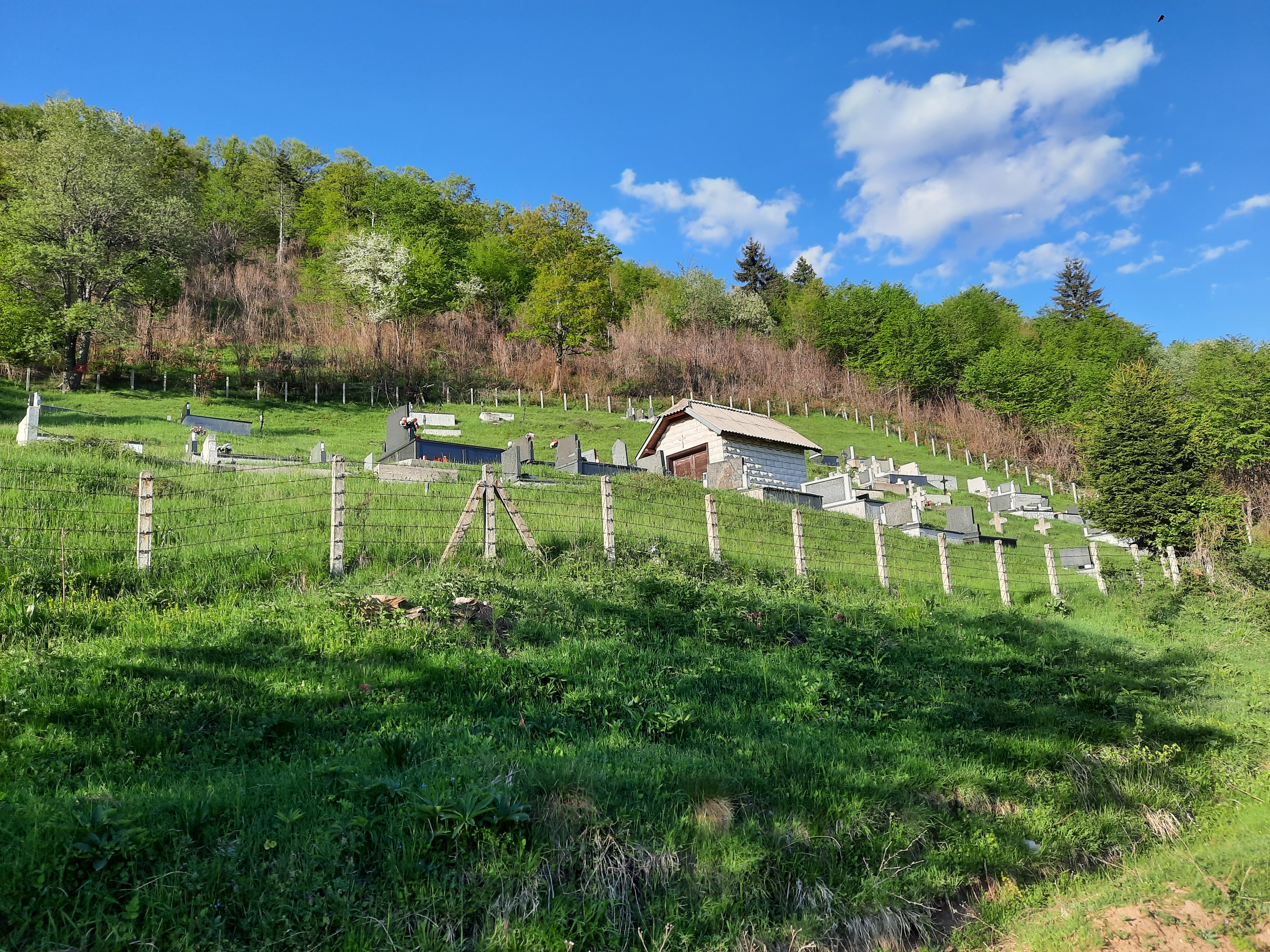
- A cemetery in Taračin Do

- Location within Bosnia and Herzegovina
- Coordinates: 43°59′26″N 18°21′46″E
- Country: Bosnia and Herzegovina
- Entity: Federation of Bosnia and Herzegovina
- Canton: Sarajevo
- Municipality: Ilijaš

Area
  - Total: 3.56 sq mi (9.23 km^{2})

Population (2013)
  - Total: 0
  - Density: 0.0/sq mi (0.0/km^{2})
- Time zone: UTC+1 (CET)
  - Summer (DST): UTC+2 (CEST)

Taračin Do is a village in the municipality of Ilijaš, Bosnia and Herzegovina.

Taračin Do is 15 kilometers north of Sarajevo, and it is easiest to reach it through Solakovići, a five-kilometer-long local road that separates on the 22nd kilometer of the main road (M-18) Sarajevo-Tuzla, Ljubini. It is now only a geographic name for a desolate place that is no longer inhabited. Over a century, Taračin Do was a geographic, spiritual, educational-cultural and administrative-administrative center of the wider area, consisting of about twenty villages between Semizovac and Srednje, in the Ljubina and Misoča river basins.

== Demographics ==
According to the 2013 census, its population was nil, down from 83 in 1991.
