= Šabanci =

Šabanci may refer to a village in Bosnia and Herzegovina:

- Šabanci (Goražde), a village in the municipality of Goražde
- Šabanci (Ilijaš), a village in the municipality of Ilijaš
- Šabanci (Trnovo), a village in the municipality of Trnovo
