= Duboki Potok =

Duboki Potok, which translates as Deep Stream from Serbo-Croatian, may refer to:

- Duboki Potok (Ilijaš), a village in Bosnia and Herzegovina
- Duboki Potok (Srebrenik), a village in Bosnia and Herzegovina
- Duboki Potok Monastery, a monastery in the Eparchy of Raška and Prizren, Kosovo
