= Vukasović =

Vukasović (Serbian Cyrillic: Вукасовић) is a Serbo-Croatian surname, a patronymic derived from the Slavic name Vukas, a variant of Vuk. Notable people with the surname include:

- Nenad Vukasović (born 1952), Serbian politician
- Vid Vuletić Vukasović (1853–1933), writer and ethnographer from Dubrovnik
- Marko Vukasović (born 1990), Montenegrin footballer
- Mladen Vukasović (born 1992), Montenegrin footballer
- Josef Philipp Vukassovich (1755–1809), Habsburg Croatian military commander
- Ivanka Vukasović, Serbian film editor (W.R.: Mysteries of the Organism)
- Volcasso (or Vukasović), Ragusan noble family

== See also ==
- Vukasovići, village in Bosnia
