= Vuknić =

Coordinates: 44.7850°N 15.8433°E

Vuknić Вукнић
- Village
- Interactive map of Vuknić
- Country: Bosnia and Herzegovina
- Entity: Republika Srpska
- Municipality: Istočni Stari Grad
- Time zone: UTC+1 (CET)
  - Summer (DST): UTC+2 (CEST)

Vuknić (Serbian Cyrillic: Вукнић) is a village in the municipality of Istočni Stari Grad, Bosnia and Herzegovina.
