= Gornje Biosko =

- Village
- Location within Bosnia and Herzegovina
- Coordinates: 43°53′53″N 18°28′09″E
- Country: Bosnia and Herzegovina
- Entity: Republika Srpska; Federation of Bosnia and Herzegovina
- Region Canton: Sarajevo; Sarajevo
- Municipality: Istočni Stari Grad; Stari Grad Sarajevo

Area
  - Total: 5.40 sq mi (13.98 km^{2})

Population (2013)
  - Total: 144
  - Density: 26.7/sq mi (10.3/km^{2})
- Time zone: UTC+1 (CET)
  - Summer (DST): UTC+2 (CEST)

Gornje Biosko is a village in the municipalities of Istočni Stari Grad (Republika Srpska) and Stari Grad Sarajevo, Bosnia and Herzegovina.

== Demographics ==
According to the 2013 census, its population was 144 (all Serbs), with 96 of them living in the Republika Srpska part and 48 living in the Federation part.
