= Donje Međuše =

Donje Međuše Доње Међуше
- Village
- Location within Bosnia and Herzegovina
- Coordinates: 43°49′N 18°27′E
- Country: Bosnia and Herzegovina
- Entity: Republika Srpska
- Municipality: Istočni Stari Grad
- Time zone: UTC+1 (CET)
  - Summer (DST): UTC+2 (CEST)

Donje Međuše (Serbian Cyrillic: Доње Међуше) is a village in Bosnia and Herzegovina. According to the 1991 census, the village is located in the municipality of Istočni Stari Grad.
