= Sirovine =

Sirovine Сировине
- Village
- Location within Bosnia and Herzegovina
- Coordinates: 43°59′39″N 18°34′42″E
- Country: Bosnia and Herzegovina
- Entity: Republika Srpska
- Municipality: Istočni Stari Grad
- Time zone: UTC+1 (CET)
  - Summer (DST): UTC+2 (CEST)

Sirovine (Serbian Cyrillic: Сировине) is a village in the municipality of Istočni Stari Grad, Bosnia and Herzegovina.
