= Šljeme =

- Village
- Location within Bosnia and Herzegovina
- Coordinates: 43°57′N 18°31′E
- Country: Bosnia and Herzegovina
- Municipality: Ilijaš
- Time zone: UTC+1 (CET)
  - Summer (DST): UTC+2 (CEST)

Šljeme is a village in the municipality of Ilijaš, Bosnia and Herzegovina.
