= Vukasovići =

- Village
- Location within Bosnia and Herzegovina
- Coordinates: 44°01′03″N 18°30′21″E
- Country: Bosnia and Herzegovina
- Entity: Federation of Bosnia and Herzegovina
- Canton: Sarajevo
- Municipality: Ilijaš

Area
  - Total: 1.59 sq mi (4.13 km^{2})

Population (2013)
  - Total: 100
  - Density: 63/sq mi (24/km^{2})
- Time zone: UTC+1 (CET)
  - Summer (DST): UTC+2 (CEST)

Vukasovići is a village in the municipality of Ilijaš, Bosnia and Herzegovina.

== History ==
According to old gravestones from the 15th century, it is estimated that this area was inhabited even in medieval period.

== Geography ==
- Draževići
- Gudelj
- Gornja Kustura
- Donja Kustura
- Homar
- Lokve
- Ravne

== Demographics ==
According to the 2013 census, its population was 100, all Bosniaks.
