= Karaula =

Karaula may refer to:

- Karaula (film) or The Border Post, a 2006 Serbo-Croatian film
- Karaula (Ilijaš), a village in Bosnia and Herzegovina
- Karaula (Kakanj), a village in Bosnia and Herzegovina
- Karaula (Prijepolje), a village in Serbia
