= Lađevići =

Šljivno may refer to the following places in Bosnia and Herzegovina:

- Lađevići, Bileća, Bileća
- Lađevići (Ilijaš)
