= Misoča =

- Village
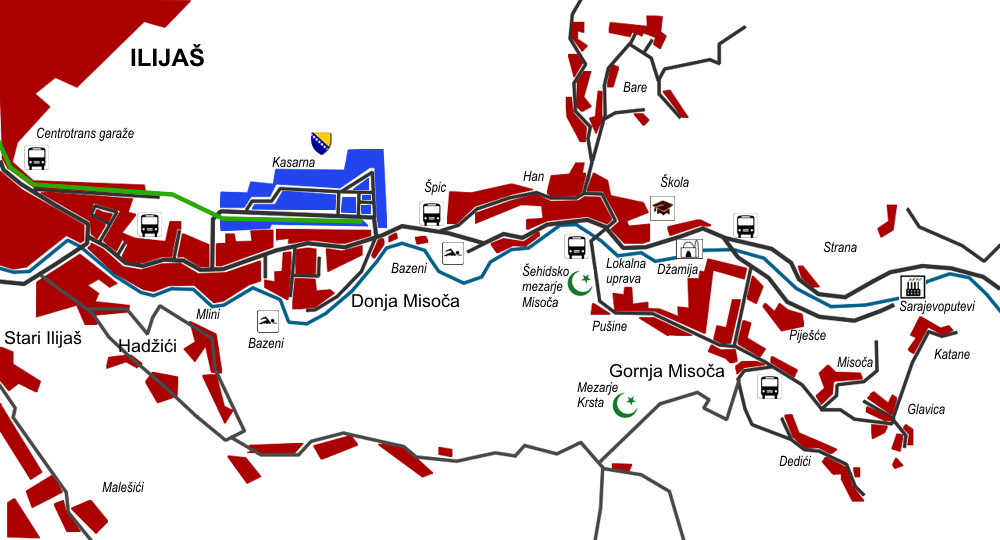
- Map of Misoča

- Location within Bosnia and Herzegovina
- Country: Bosnia and Herzegovina
- Entity: Federation of Bosnia and Herzegovina
- Canton: Sarajevo
- Municipality: Ilijaš
- Time zone: UTC+1 (CET)
  - Summer (DST): UTC+2 (CEST)

Misoča is one of the largest settlements of the Ilijaš Municipality, known in Bosnian as Naselje Misoča. It is the biggest community in the municipality of Ilijaš with 981 residents. Ethnically, the majority of the settlement consists of Bosniaks, numbering at 857 people, 121 are Serbs, 6 are Croats, 9 are classified as others. Otherwise, the community of Misoča is known as the place with the first organized Bosniak defense against local Serbs.

Misoča is the largest area in the municipality Ilijaš, Sarajevo Canton.

== History ==
Prior to the war in Bosnia and Herzegovina, the settlement was separated into two parts: Donja Misoča and Gornja Misoča. Now, it is simply known as Misoča, with one local community – Misoča. Places in Misoča are: Bare, Dedići, Glavica, Matorugin Han, Katane, Misoča, Mlini, Pušine, and Strana. Misoča is 18 kilometers far from Sarajevo and only one mile from the municipality of Ilijaš.
