= Lipnik (Ilijaš) =

Lipnik Липник
- Village
- Location within Bosnia and Herzegovina
- Coordinates: 43°59′42″N 18°33′20″E
- Country: Bosnia and Herzegovina
- Entity: Republika Srpska; Federation of Bosnia and Herzegovina
- Region Canton: Sarajevo; Sarajevo
- Municipality: Istočni Stari Grad; Ilijaš

Area
  - Total: 2.67 sq mi (6.92 km^{2})

Population (2013)
  - Total: 11
  - Density: 4.1/sq mi (1.6/km^{2})
- Time zone: UTC+1 (CET)
  - Summer (DST): UTC+2 (CEST)

Lipnik is a village in the municipalities of Istočni Stari Grad (Republika Srpska) and Ilijaš, Bosnia and Herzegovina.

== Demographics ==
According to the 2013 census, its population was 11, all Bosniaks living in the Ilijaš part, thus none in the Istočni Stari Grad.
