= Gornje Međuše =

Gornje Međuše Горње Међуше
- Village
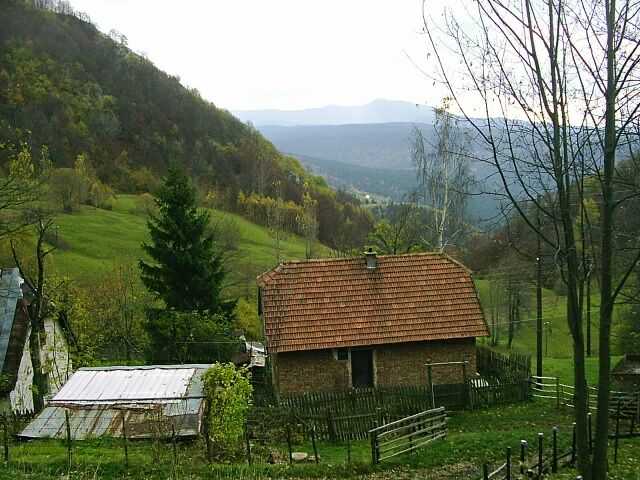

- Location within Bosnia and Herzegovina
- Coordinates: 43°49′N 18°28′E
- Country: Bosnia and Herzegovina
- Entity: Republika Srpska
- Municipality: Istočni Stari Grad
- Time zone: UTC+1 (CET)
  - Summer (DST): UTC+2 (CEST)

Gornje Međuše (Serbian: Горње Међуше) is a village in Bosnia and Herzegovina. According to the 1991 census, it is in the municipality of Istočni Stari Grad.
