= Vučja Luka =

Vučja Luka Вучја Лука
- Village
- Location within Bosnia and Herzegovina
- Coordinates: 43°55′N 18°31′E
- Country: Bosnia and Herzegovina
- Entity: Republika Srpska; Federation of Bosnia and Herzegovina
- Region Canton: Sarajevo; Sarajevo
- Municipality: Istočni Stari Grad; Stari Grad Sarajevo

Area
  - Total: 9.64 sq mi (24.97 km^{2})

Population (2013)
  - Total: 257
  - Density: 26.7/sq mi (10.3/km^{2})
- Time zone: UTC+1 (CET)
  - Summer (DST): UTC+2 (CEST)

Vučja Luka (Serbian: Вучја Лука) is a village in the municipalities of Istočni Stari Grad (Republika Srpska) and Stari Grad Sarajevo, Bosnia and Herzegovina.

== Demographics ==
According to the 2013 census, its population was 257, with 256 of them living in the Republika Srpska part and 1 Serb living in the Federation part.

Ethnicity in 2013
Ethnicity	Number	Percentage
Serbs	251	97.7%
Bosniaks	2	0.8%
Croats	1	0.4%
other/undeclared	3	1.2%
Total	257	100%
