= Dubrovnik (disambiguation) =

Dubrovnik is a city in Croatia.

Dubrovnik may also refer to:

- MF Dubrovnik (built 1979), a ferry operated by the Croatian shipping company Jadrolinija
- Yugoslav destroyer Dubrovnik, a destroyer built in 1931 for the Royal Yugoslav Navy
- KK Dubrovnik, basketball club from Dubrovnik
- Dubrovnik chess set, a chess set
- Dubrovnik (literary almanac), published in Dubrovnik 1849–1850, and Zagreb in 1851, and as an annual collection in 1867, 1868, 1870 and 1876
- Dubrovnik (literary magazine), published by the Dubrovnik branch of the Matica hrvatska, since 1955 occasionally and from 1964 quarterly
- Medieval Town of Dubrovnik, Bosnia, a medieval fortress in Bosnia and Herzegovina

== See also ==
- Dobrovnik
- Doubravník
