= Dubrovnik Castle =

Medieval fortress, Ilijaš, Bosnia and Herzegovina

- Ilijaš, Bosnia and Herzegovina
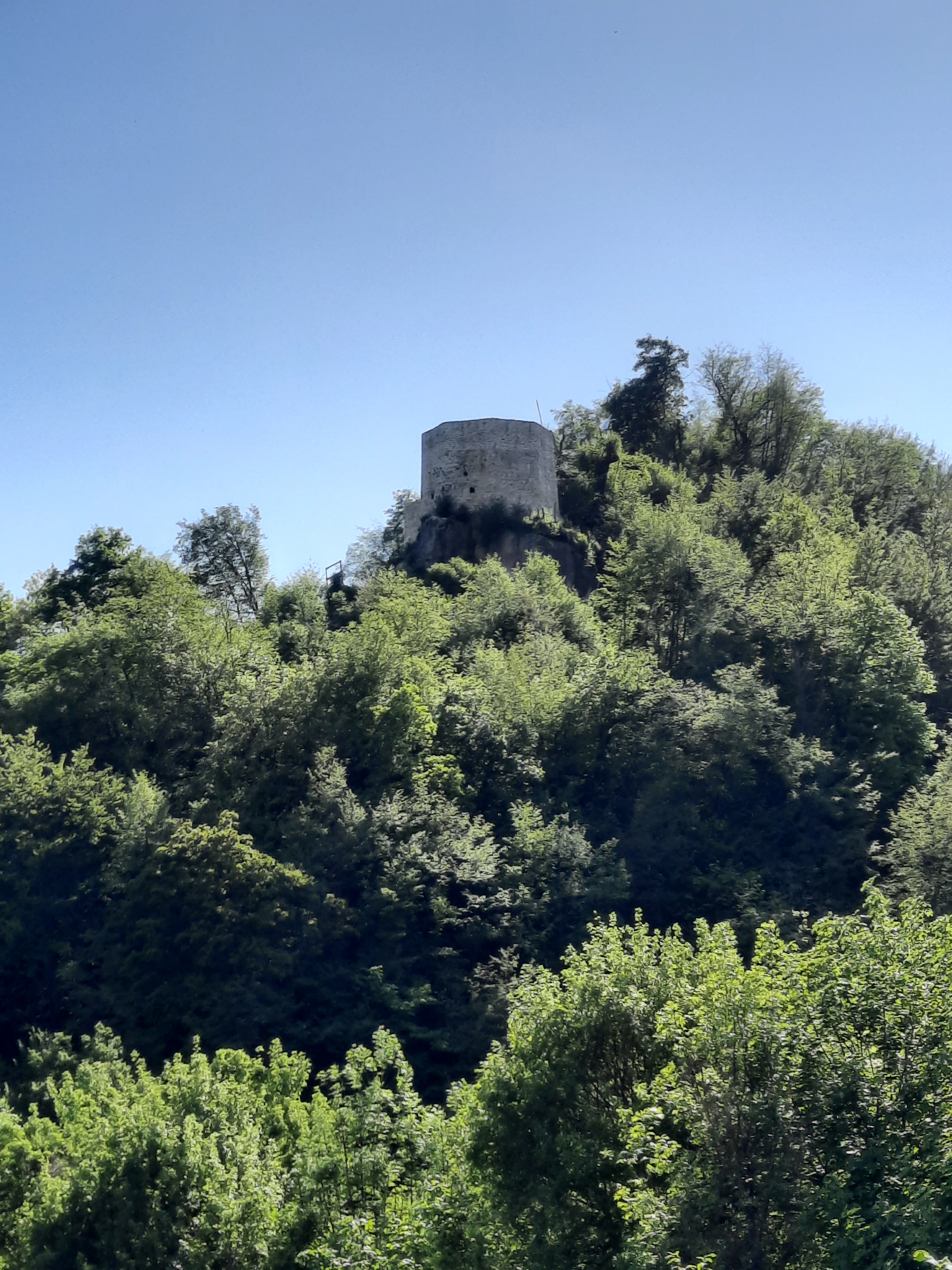
- Medieval Fortress of Dubrovnik

Location
- Coordinates: 43.9932°N 18.3362°E

Site history
- Built: 13th c.

Garrison information
- Designations

KONS of Bosnia and Herzegovina
- Official name: Old Dubrovnik Fort in Višnjica, the archaeological site
- Type: Category archaeological site of Bosnia and Herzegovina
- Criteria: A, B, C iv., D i., F iii., G v..
- Designated: 8 October 2003 (?th session; Decision number: 06-6-14/03-3)
- Reference no.: 1845
- State: National Monuments of Bosnia and Herzegovina

Medieval Town of Dubrovnik, also Old Dubrovnik Fort in Višnjica, is medieval fortress in the area of Višnjica, Ilijaš municipality, Bosnia and Herzegovina. The city was seat of the Bosnian Knez Batić of Mirković's. In 2014 it was declared as National monument of Bosnia and Herzegovina.

== History ==
It was built on the Hum, 882 meters high peak setteled above confluence of the mountain stream Zenik and small river Misoča.

In the 13th century, the area between Sarajevo and Visočki polje belonged to the old Bosnian Vidogošći-Vogošći parish, in which Dubrovnik, together with its podgrađe, is the main political center of this parish. Although there are no precise data on the origin of the city, it is assumed that it was built in the 13th century because it was first mentioned in the Dubrovnik archives (Dubrovnik Chancellery - Diversa Cancellariae), on July 11, 1404, which talks about the transport of goods to Deževica, Podvisko and to a place called "Doboruonich".

The city belonged to and was also seat of Mirković's, a noble family whose most prominent member in the times of King Tvrtko II was Bosnian Knez Batić, which is testified by an inscription on his stećak found in a necropolis in Kopošić.

== Name ==
It is believed that the town was named after the medieval merchants from Dubrovnik, how Ragusa was called by its own and city's hinterland Slavic population already back then, who came in that period with the approval of the Bosnian king to exploit the mines of lead, zinc, gold and other precious materials.

== Restoration and protection ==
In 2014 it was declared by the KONS a National monument of Bosnia and Herzegovina under the name Old Dubrovnik Fort in Višnjica, the archaeological site.
