= Ozren =

Ozren (pronounced [ɔ̌zrɛn]) may refer to:

== Places ==
- Ozren (Bosnia and Herzegovina), a mountain in northern Bosnia
  - Ozren Monastery, near Mount Ozren
- Ozren (Ilijaš), a village in the municipality of Ilijaš, Bosnia and Herzegovina
- Ozren (Pešter), a mountain in southwestern Serbia
- Ozren (Sokobanja), a mountain in eastern Serbia
- Sarajevo's Ozren, a mountain near Sarajevo, Bosnia and Herzegovina

== People ==
- Ozren Bonačić (born 1942), Croatian water polo player who competed in the 1964 and 1968 Summer Olympic Games
- Ozren Nedeljković (1903–84), Serbian chessplayer
- Ozren Nedoklan (1922–2004), Yugoslav footballer and manager
- Ozren Grabarić (born 1980), Croatian actor
- Ozren Perić (born 1987), Bosnian Serb footballer

== Organisations ==
- FK Ozren (disambiguation), several football clubs
