= Rakova Noga (Ilijaš) =

- Village
- Location within Bosnia and Herzegovina
- Coordinates: 44°00′58″N 18°34′31″E
- Country: Bosnia and Herzegovina
- Entity: Republika Srpska; Federation of Bosnia and Herzegovina
- Region Canton: Sarajevo; Sarajevo
- Municipality: Istočni Stari Grad; Ilijaš

Area
  - Total: 1.34 sq mi (3.47 km^{2})

Population (2013)
  - Total: 2
  - Density: 1.5/sq mi (0.58/km^{2})
- Time zone: UTC+1 (CET)
  - Summer (DST): UTC+2 (CEST)

Rakova Noga is a village in the municipalities of Istočni Stari Grad (Republika Srpska) and Ilijaš, Bosnia and Herzegovina.

== Demographics ==
According to the 2013 census, its population was 2, both Serbs living in the Ilijaš part, thus none in the Istočni Stari Grad.
