= Luka, Ilijaš =

Luka
- Village
- Location within Bosnia and Herzegovina
- Coordinates: 43°56′47″N 18°15′17″E
- Country: Bosnia and Herzegovina
- Entity: Federation of Bosnia and Herzegovina
- Canton: Sarajevo
- Municipality: Ilijaš

Area
  - Total: 0.48 sq mi (1.25 km^{2})

Population (2013)
  - Total: 1,029
  - Density: 2,130/sq mi (823/km^{2})
- Time zone: UTC+1 (CET)
  - Summer (DST): UTC+2 (CEST)

Luka is a village in the municipality of Ilijaš, Bosnia and Herzegovina.

== Demographics ==
According to the 2013 census, its population was 1,029.

Ethnicity in 2013
Ethnicity	Number	Percentage
Bosniaks	1,005	97.7%
Serbs	17	1.7%
Croats	2	0.2%
other/undeclared	5	0.5%
Total	1,029	100%
