= Ljubnići =

Ljubnići Љубнићи
- Village
- Location within Bosnia and Herzegovina
- Coordinates: 43°58′N 18°14′E
- Country: Bosnia and Herzegovina
- Entity: Federation of Bosnia and Herzegovina
- Canton: Sarajevo
- Municipality: Ilijaš

Area
  - Total: 1.70 sq mi (4.41 km^{2})

Population (2013)
  - Total: 707
  - Density: 415/sq mi (160/km^{2})
- Time zone: UTC+1 (CET)
  - Summer (DST): UTC+2 (CEST)

Ljubnići (Serbian: Љубнићи) is a village in the municipality of Ilijaš, Bosnia and Herzegovina.

== Demographics ==
According to the 2013 census, its population was 707.

Ethnicity in 2013
Ethnicity	Number	Percentage
Bosniaks	701	99.2%
Serbs	4	0.6%
Croats	1	0.1%
other/undeclared	1	0.1%
Total	707	100%
