= Kamenica (Ilijaš) =

- Village
- Location within Bosnia and Herzegovina
- Coordinates: 43°58′08″N 18°21′06″E
- Country: Bosnia and Herzegovina
- Entity: Federation of Bosnia and Herzegovina
- Canton: Sarajevo
- Municipality: Ilijaš

Area
  - Total: 5.29 sq mi (13.69 km^{2})

Population (2013)
  - Total: 738
  - Density: 140/sq mi (53.9/km^{2})
- Time zone: UTC+1 (CET)
  - Summer (DST): UTC+2 (CEST)

Kamenica is a village in the municipality of Ilijaš, Bosnia and Herzegovina.

== Demographics ==
According to the 2013 census, its population was 738.

Ethnicity in 2013
Ethnicity	Number	Percentage
Bosniaks	731	99.1%
other/undeclared	7	0.9%
Total	738	100%
