= Kožlje =

- Village
- Location within Bosnia and Herzegovina
- Coordinates: 43°58′06″N 18°22′53″E
- Country: Bosnia and Herzegovina
- Entity: Federation of Bosnia and Herzegovina
- Canton: Sarajevo
- Municipality: Ilijaš

Area
  - Total: 2.15 sq mi (5.57 km^{2})

Population (2013)
  - Total: 23
  - Density: 11/sq mi (4.1/km^{2})
- Time zone: UTC+1 (CET)
  - Summer (DST): UTC+2 (CEST)

Kožlje is a village in the municipality of Ilijaš, Bosnia and Herzegovina.

== Demographics ==
According to the 2013 census, its population was 23.

Ethnicity in 2013
Ethnicity	Number	Percentage
Croats	22	95.7%
Serbs	1	4.3%
Total	23	100%
