= Sudići =

Sudići Судићи (Илијаш)
- Village
- Location within Bosnia and Herzegovina
- Coordinates: 44°02′55″N 18°32′31″E
- Country: Bosnia and Herzegovina
- Entity: Federation of Bosnia and Herzegovina
- Canton: Sarajevo
- Municipality: Ilijaš

Area
  - Total: 2.71 sq mi (7.02 km^{2})

Population (2013)
  - Total: 101
  - Density: 37.3/sq mi (14.4/km^{2})
- Time zone: UTC+1 (CET)
  - Summer (DST): UTC+2 (CEST)

Sudići is a village in the municipality of Ilijaš, Bosnia and Herzegovina.

== Demographics ==
According to the 2013 census, its population was 101, all Bosniaks.
