= Ribarići (Ilijaš) =

- Village
- Location within Bosnia and Herzegovina
- Coordinates: 43°56′N 18°17′E
- Country: Bosnia and Herzegovina
- Entity: Federation of Bosnia and Herzegovina
- Canton: Sarajevo
- Municipality: Ilijaš

Area
  - Total: 0.69 sq mi (1.78 km^{2})

Population (2013)
  - Total: 65
  - Density: 95/sq mi (37/km^{2})
- Time zone: UTC+1 (CET)
  - Summer (DST): UTC+2 (CEST)

Ribarići is a village in the municipality of Ilijaš, Bosnia and Herzegovina.

== Demographics ==
According to the 2013 census, its population was 65.

Ethnicity in 2013
Ethnicity	Number	Percentage
Bosniaks	58	89.2%
Serbs	6	9.2%
other/undeclared	1	1.5%
Total	65	100%
