= Balibegovići =

Balibegovici
- Village
- Location within Bosnia and Herzegovina
- Coordinates: 43°58′N 18°14′E
- Country: Bosnia and Herzegovina
- Entity: Federation of Bosnia and Herzegovina
- Canton: Sarajevo
- Municipality: Ilijaš

Area
  - Total: 0.72 sq mi (1.86 km^{2})

Population (2013)
  - Total: 110
  - Density: 150/sq mi (59/km^{2})
- Time zone: UTC+1 (CET)
  - Summer (DST): UTC+2 (CEST)

Balbegovići is a village in the municipality of Ilijaš, Bosnia and Herzegovina.

== Demographics ==
According to the 2013 census, its population was 110.

Ethnicity in 2013
Ethnicity	Number	Percentage
Bosniaks	106	96.4%
Croats	1	0.9%
Serbs	0	0.0%
other/undeclared	3	2.7%
Total	110	100%
