= Visojevica =

- Village
- Location within Bosnia and Herzegovina
- Coordinates: 43°59′N 18°28′E
- Country: Bosnia and Herzegovina
- Entity: Federation of Bosnia and Herzegovina
- Canton: Sarajevo
- Municipality: Ilijaš

Area
  - Total: 5.20 sq mi (13.46 km^{2})

Population (2013)
  - Total: 16
  - Density: 3.1/sq mi (1.2/km^{2})
- Time zone: UTC+1 (CET)
  - Summer (DST): UTC+2 (CEST)

Visojevica is a village in the municipality of Ilijaš, Bosnia and Herzegovina.

== Demographics ==
According to the 2013 census, its population was 16.

Ethnicity in 2013
Ethnicity	Number	Percentage
Serbs	10	62.5%
Bosniaks	6	37.5%
Total	16	100%
