= FK Ozren =

FK Ozren may refer to:

- FK Ozren Petrovo, Bosnia and Herzegovina football club
- FK Ozren Semizovac, Bosnia and Herzegovina football club
- FK Ozren Sokobanja, Serbian football club

== See also ==
- Ozren (disambiguation)
