= Krivajevići =

Krivajevići Кривајевићи
- Village
- Location within Bosnia and Herzegovina
- Coordinates: 44°04′55″N 18°31′32″E
- Country: Bosnia and Herzegovina
- Entity: Federation of Bosnia and Herzegovina
- Canton: Sarajevo
- Municipality: Ilijaš

Area
  - Total: 2.64 sq mi (6.83 km^{2})

Population (2013)
  - Total: 36
  - Density: 14/sq mi (5.3/km^{2})
- Time zone: UTC+1 (CET)
  - Summer (DST): UTC+2 (CEST)

Krivajevići is a village in the municipality of Ilijaš, Bosnia and Herzegovina.

== Demographics ==
According to the 2013 census, its population was 36.

Ethnicity in 2013
Ethnicity	Number	Percentage
Bosniaks	18	50.0%
Serbs	17	47.2%
Croats	1	2.8%
Total	36	100%
