= Odžak (Ilijaš) =

Odžak Оџак
- Village
- Location within Bosnia and Herzegovina
- Country: Bosnia and Herzegovina
- Entity: Federation of Bosnia and Herzegovina
- Canton: Sarajevo
- Municipality: Ilijaš

Area
  - Total: 0.48 sq mi (1.24 km^{2})

Population (2013)
  - Total: 307
  - Density: 641/sq mi (248/km^{2})
- Time zone: UTC+1 (CET)
  - Summer (DST): UTC+2 (CEST)

Odžak is a village in the municipality of Ilijaš, Bosnia and Herzegovina.

== Demographics ==
According to the 2013 census, its population was 307.

Ethnicity in 2013
| Ethnicity | Number | Percentage |
|---|---|---|
| Bosniaks | 303 | 98.7% |
| Serbs | 3 | 1.0% |
| Croats | 1 | 0.3% |
| Total | 307 | 100% |
