= Vilić =

- Village
- Location within Bosnia and Herzegovina
- Coordinates: 43°59′51″N 18°29′37″E
- Country: Bosnia and Herzegovina
- Entity: Federation of Bosnia and Herzegovina
- Canton: Sarajevo
- Municipality: Ilijaš

Area
  - Total: 1.68 sq mi (4.36 km^{2})

Population (2013)
  - Total: 6
  - Density: 3.6/sq mi (1.4/km^{2})
- Time zone: UTC+1 (CET)
  - Summer (DST): UTC+2 (CEST)

Vilić is a village in the municipality of Ilijaš, Bosnia and Herzegovina.Vilić is also a village in Croatia, near Omiš.

== Demographics ==
According to the 2013 census, its population was 6, all Bosniaks.
