= Gojanovići (Ilijaš) =

- Village
- Location within Bosnia and Herzegovina
- Coordinates: 44°03′N 18°29′E
- Country: Bosnia and Herzegovina
- Entity: Federation of Bosnia and Herzegovina
- Canton: Sarajevo
- Municipality: Ilijaš

Area
  - Total: 1.61 sq mi (4.17 km^{2})

Population (2013)
  - Total: 82
  - Density: 51/sq mi (20/km^{2})
- Time zone: UTC+1 (CET)
  - Summer (DST): UTC+2 (CEST)

Gojanovići is a village in the municipality of Ilijaš, Bosnia and Herzegovina.

== Demographics ==
According to the 2013 census, its population was 82.

Ethnicity in 2013
Ethnicity	Number	Percentage
Bosniaks	75	91.5%
Serbs	3	3.7%
other/undeclared	4	4.9%
Total	82	100%
