= Ljubina, Ilijaš =

Ljubina Љубина
- Village
- Location within Bosnia and Herzegovina
- Coordinates: 43°58′20″N 18°22′23″E
- Country: Bosnia and Herzegovina
- Entity: Federation of Bosnia and Herzegovina
- Canton: Sarajevo
- Municipality: Ilijaš

Area
  - Total: 0.50 sq mi (1.29 km^{2})

Population (2013)
  - Total: 38
  - Density: 76/sq mi (29/km^{2})
- Time zone: UTC+1 (CET)
  - Summer (DST): UTC+2 (CEST)

Ljubina is a village in the municipality of Ilijaš, Bosnia and Herzegovina.

== Demographics ==
According to the 2013 census, its population was 38.

Ethnicity in 2013
Ethnicity	Number	Percentage
Croats	20	52.6%
Bosniaks	17	44.7%
other/undeclared	1	2.6%
Total	38	100%
