= Kunosići =

Kunosići Куносићи
- Village
- Location within Bosnia and Herzegovina
- Coordinates: 44°04′07″N 18°24′53″E
- Country: Bosnia and Herzegovina
- Entity: Federation of Bosnia and Herzegovina
- Canton: Sarajevo
- Municipality: Ilijaš

Area
  - Total: 0.89 sq mi (2.30 km^{2})

Population (2013)
  - Total: 0
  - Density: 0.0/sq mi (0.0/km^{2})
- Time zone: UTC+1 (CET)
  - Summer (DST): UTC+2 (CEST)

Kunosići (Serbian: Куносићи) is a village in the municipality of Ilijaš, Bosnia and Herzegovina.

== Demographics ==
According to the 2013 census, its population was nil, down from 19 in 1991.
