= Malešići (Ilijaš) =

Malešići Малешићи
- Village
- Location within Bosnia and Herzegovina
- Coordinates: 43°55′48″N 18°17′02″E
- Country: Bosnia and Herzegovina
- Entity: Federation of Bosnia and Herzegovina
- Canton: Sarajevo
- Municipality: Ilijaš

Area
  - Total: 2.06 sq mi (5.33 km^{2})

Population (2013)
  - Total: 762
  - Density: 370/sq mi (143/km^{2})
- Time zone: UTC+1 (CET)
  - Summer (DST): UTC+2 (CEST)

Malešići is a village in the municipality of Ilijaš, Bosnia and Herzegovina.

== Demographics ==
According to the 1991 census, the total population was 883, out of which 832 (94,22%) of the inhabitants were ethnic Serbs.

According to the 2013 census, its population was 762.

Ethnicity in 2013
Ethnicity	Number	Percentage
Bosniaks	621	81.5%
Serbs	80	10.5%
other/undeclared	61	8.0%
Total	762	100%

== Notable people ==
- Maya Berović, pop singer
