= Duševine =

Duševine Душевине
- Village
- Location within Bosnia and Herzegovina
- Coordinates: 44°04′N 18°31′E
- Country: Bosnia and Herzegovina
- Entity: Federation of Bosnia and Herzegovina
- Canton: Sarajevo
- Municipality: Ilijaš

Area
  - Total: 1.32 sq mi (3.43 km^{2})

Population (2013)
  - Total: 10
  - Density: 7.6/sq mi (2.9/km^{2})
- Time zone: UTC+1 (CET)
  - Summer (DST): UTC+2 (CEST)

Duševine (Serbian: Душевине) is a village in the municipality of Ilijaš, Bosnia and Herzegovina.

== Demographics ==
According to the 2013 census, its population was 10.

Ethnicity in 2013
Ethnicity	Number	Percentage			
Bosniaks	9	90.0%			
Serbs	1	10.0%	Total	10	100%
