= Bokšići =

- Village
- Location within Bosnia and Herzegovina
- Coordinates: 43°59′N 18°26′E
- Country: Bosnia and Herzegovina
- Entity: Federation of Bosnia and Herzegovina
- Canton: Sarajevo
- Municipality: Ilijaš

Area
  - Total: 2.32 sq mi (6.00 km^{2})

Population (2013)
  - Total: 27
  - Density: 12/sq mi (4.5/km^{2})
- Time zone: UTC+1 (CET)
  - Summer (DST): UTC+2 (CEST)

Bokšići is a village in the municipality of Ilijaš, Bosnia and Herzegovina.

== Demographics ==
According to the 2013 census, its population was 27.

Ethnicity in 2013
Ethnicity	Number	Percentage
Croats	20	74.1%
Bosniaks	6	22.2%
Serbs	1	3.7%
Total	27	100%
