= Popovići, Ilijaš =

Popovići Поповићи
- Village
- Location within Bosnia and Herzegovina
- Coordinates: 43°58′47″N 18°17′26″E
- Country: Bosnia and Herzegovina
- Entity: Federation of Bosnia and Herzegovina
- Canton: Sarajevo
- Municipality: Ilijaš

Area
  - Total: 1.43 sq mi (3.70 km^{2})

Population (2013)
  - Total: 259
  - Density: 181/sq mi (70.0/km^{2})
- Time zone: UTC+1 (CET)
  - Summer (DST): UTC+2 (CEST)

Popovići is a village in the municipality of Ilijaš, Bosnia and Herzegovina.

== Demographics ==
According to the 2013 census, its population was 259.

Ethnicity in 2013
| Ethnicity | Number | Percentage |
|---|---|---|
| Bosniaks | 253 | 97.7% |
| other/undeclared | 6 | 2.3% |
| Total | 259 | 100% |
