= Gajevi (Ilijaš) =

Gajevi Гајеви
- Village
- Location within Bosnia and Herzegovina
- Coordinates: 44°01′57″N 18°30′59″E
- Country: Bosnia and Herzegovina
- Entity: Federation of Bosnia and Herzegovina
- Canton: Sarajevo
- Municipality: Ilijaš

Area
  - Total: 0.36 sq mi (0.94 km^{2})

Population (2013)
  - Total: 58
  - Density: 160/sq mi (62/km^{2})
- Time zone: UTC+1 (CET)
  - Summer (DST): UTC+2 (CEST)

Gajevi is a village in the municipality of Ilijaš, Bosnia and Herzegovina.

== Demographics ==
According to the 2013 census, its population was 58.

Ethnicity in 2013
Ethnicity	Number	Percentage
Bosniaks	57	98.3%
Croats	1	1.7%
Total	58	100%
