= Sovrle =

Sovrle Соврле
- Village
- Location within Bosnia and Herzegovina
- Coordinates: 43°59′N 18°16′E
- Country: Bosnia and Herzegovina
- Entity: Federation of Bosnia and Herzegovina
- Canton: Sarajevo
- Municipality: Ilijaš

Area
  - Total: 0.81 sq mi (2.10 km^{2})

Population (2013)
  - Total: 1,324
  - Density: 1,630/sq mi (630/km^{2})
- Time zone: UTC+1 (CET)
  - Summer (DST): UTC+2 (CEST)

Sovrle (Serbian: Соврле) is a village in the municipality of Ilijaš, Bosnia and Herzegovina.

== Demographics ==
According to the 2013 census, its population was 1,324.

Ethnicity in 2013
Ethnicity	Number	Percentage
Bosniaks	1,253	94.6%
Serbs	13	1.0%
Croats	11	0.8%
other/undeclared	47	3.5%
Total	1,324	100%
