= Vidotina =

- Village
- Location within Bosnia and Herzegovina
- Coordinates: 43°58′26″N 18°24′48″E
- Country: Bosnia and Herzegovina
- Entity: Federation of Bosnia and Herzegovina
- Canton: Sarajevo
- Municipality: Ilijaš

Area
  - Total: 1.48 sq mi (3.84 km^{2})

Population (2013)
  - Total: 3
  - Density: 2.0/sq mi (0.78/km^{2})
- Time zone: UTC+1 (CET)
  - Summer (DST): UTC+2 (CEST)

Vidotina is a village in the municipality of Ilijaš, Bosnia and Herzegovina.

== Demographics ==
According to the 2013 census, its population was 3.

Ethnicity in 2013
Ethnicity	Number	Percentage
Croats	2	66.7%
other/undeclared	1	33.3%
Total	3	100%
