= Han Šići =

Han Šići Хан Шићи
- Village
- Location within Bosnia and Herzegovina
- Country: Bosnia and Herzegovina
- Entity: Federation of Bosnia and Herzegovina
- Canton: Sarajevo
- Municipality: Ilijaš

Area
  - Total: 1.45 sq mi (3.76 km^{2})

Population (2013)
  - Total: 4
  - Density: 2.8/sq mi (1.1/km^{2})
- Time zone: UTC+1 (CET)
  - Summer (DST): UTC+2 (CEST)

Han Šići (Serbian: Хан Шићи) is a village in the municipality of Ilijaš, Bosnia and Herzegovina.

== Demographics ==
According to the 2013 census, its population was 4, all Bosniaks.
