= Banjer (Ilijaš) =

- Village
- Location within Bosnia and Herzegovina
- Coordinates: 43°58′N 18°13′E
- Country: Bosnia and Herzegovina
- Entity: Federation of Bosnia and Herzegovina
- Canton: Sarajevo
- Municipality: Ilijaš

Area
  - Total: 0.51 sq mi (1.33 km^{2})

Population (2013)
  - Total: 5
  - Density: 9.7/sq mi (3.8/km^{2})
- Time zone: UTC+1 (CET)
  - Summer (DST): UTC+2 (CEST)

Banjer is a village in the municipality of Ilijaš, Bosnia and Herzegovina.

== Demographics ==
According to the 2013 census, its population was 5, all Bosniaks.
