= Moševići (Ilijaš) =

- Village
- Location within Bosnia and Herzegovina
- Coordinates: 44°01′50″N 18°26′39″E
- Country: Bosnia and Herzegovina
- Entity: Federation of Bosnia and Herzegovina
- Canton: Sarajevo
- Municipality: Ilijaš

Area
  - Total: 1.02 sq mi (2.64 km^{2})

Population (2013)
  - Total: 80
  - Density: 78/sq mi (30/km^{2})
- Time zone: UTC+1 (CET)
  - Summer (DST): UTC+2 (CEST)

Moševići is a village in the municipality of Ilijaš, Bosnia and Herzegovina.

== Demographics ==
According to the 2013 census, its population was 80.

Ethnicity in 2013
Ethnicity	Number	Percentage
Bosniaks	79	98.8%
other/undeclared	1	1.3%
Total	80	100%
