= Medojevići, Ilijaš =

Medojevići Медојевићи
- Village
- Location within Bosnia and Herzegovina
- Coordinates: 44°00′58″N 18°28′20″E
- Country: Bosnia and Herzegovina
- Entity: Federation of Bosnia and Herzegovina
- Canton: Sarajevo
- Municipality: Ilijaš

Area
  - Total: 3.19 sq mi (8.27 km^{2})

Population (2013)
  - Total: 93
  - Density: 29/sq mi (11/km^{2})
- Time zone: UTC+1 (CET)
  - Summer (DST): UTC+2 (CEST)

Medojevići is a village in the municipality of Ilijaš, Bosnia and Herzegovina.

== Demographics ==
According to the 2013 census, its population was 93, all Bosniaks.
