= Podlipnik =

- Village
- Location within Bosnia and Herzegovina
- Coordinates: 44°01′50″N 18°33′47″E
- Country: Bosnia and Herzegovina
- Entity: Federation of Bosnia and Herzegovina
- Canton: Sarajevo
- Municipality: Ilijaš

Area
  - Total: 0.30 sq mi (0.78 km^{2})

Population (2013)
  - Total: 1
  - Density: 3.3/sq mi (1.3/km^{2})
- Time zone: UTC+1 (CET)
  - Summer (DST): UTC+2 (CEST)

Podlipnik is a village in the municipality of Ilijaš, Bosnia and Herzegovina.

== Demographics ==
According to the 2013 census, its population was just 1, a Serb.
