= Stomorine =

- Village
- Location within Bosnia and Herzegovina
- Coordinates: 44°03′N 18°26′E
- Country: Bosnia and Herzegovina
- Entity: Federation of Bosnia and Herzegovina
- Canton: Sarajevo
- Municipality: Ilijaš

Area
  - Total: 2.35 sq mi (6.08 km^{2})

Population (2013)
  - Total: 43
  - Density: 18/sq mi (7.1/km^{2})
- Time zone: UTC+1 (CET)
  - Summer (DST): UTC+2 (CEST)

Stomorine is a village in the municipality of Ilijaš, Bosnia and Herzegovina.

== Demographics ==
According to the 2013 census, its population was 43.

Ethnicity in 2013
| Ethnicity | Number | Percentage |
|---|---|---|
| Bosniaks | 35 | 81.4% |
| Serbs | 8 | 18.6% |
| Total | 43 | 100% |
