= Korita, Ilijaš =

Village in Bosnia and Herzegovina

Korita
- Village
- Location within Bosnia and Herzegovina
- Coordinates: 44.0009111°N 18.3922695°E
- Country: Bosnia and Herzegovina
- Entity: Federation of Bosnia and Herzegovina
- Canton: Sarajevo
- Municipality: Ilijaš

Area
  - Total: 2.69 sq mi (6.96 km^{2})

Population (2013)
  - Total: 1
  - Density: 0.37/sq mi (0.14/km^{2})
- Time zone: UTC+1 (CET)
  - Summer (DST): UTC+2 (CEST)

Korita is a village in the municipality of Ilijaš, Bosnia and Herzegovina.

== Demographics ==
According to the 2013 census, its population was just 1, a Bosniak.
