= RTV Visoko =

Bosnian public television channel

- Country: Bosnia and Herzegovina
- Broadcast area: Visoko area
- Headquarters: Visoko

Programming
- Language(s): Bosnian language
- Picture format: 4:3 576i SDTV

Ownership
- Owner: JP “Radio televizija Visoko”
- Sister channels: Radio Visoko

History
- Launched: 26 July 1977 (radio) 1994 (television)

Links
- Website: www.visocka.ba

Availability

Terrestrial
- Visoko: UHF 25

RTV Visoko or Televizija Visoko is a local Bosnian public television channel based in Visoko municipality. Under this name, it was established in 1994 when local Radio Visoko started television broadcasting.

RTV Visoko broadcasts a variety of programs such as local news, local sports, mosaic and documentaries. Program is mainly produced in Bosnian language.

Radio Visoko is also part of public municipality services.
