= Gornja Bioča (Ilijaš) =

- Village
- Location within Bosnia and Herzegovina
- Coordinates: 43°55′01″N 18°15′26″E
- Country: Bosnia and Herzegovina
- Entity: Federation of Bosnia and Herzegovina
- Canton: Sarajevo
- Municipality: Ilijaš

Area
  - Total: 2.54 sq mi (6.57 km^{2})

Population (2013)
  - Total: 186
  - Density: 73.3/sq mi (28.3/km^{2})
- Time zone: UTC+1 (CET)
  - Summer (DST): UTC+2 (CEST)

Gornja Bioča is a village in the municipality of Ilijaš, Bosnia and Herzegovina.

== Demographics ==
According to the 2013 census, its population was 186.

Ethnicity in 2013
| Ethnicity | Number | Percentage |
|---|---|---|
| Bosniaks | 174 | 93.5% |
| other/undeclared | 12 | 6.5% |
| Total | 186 | 100% |
