= Gajine =

Gajine Гајине
- Village
- Location within Bosnia and Herzegovina
- Coordinates: 44°04′12″N 18°34′21″E
- Country: Bosnia and Herzegovina
- Entity: Federation of Bosnia and Herzegovina
- Canton: Sarajevo
- Municipality: Ilijaš

Area
  - Total: 1.41 sq mi (3.65 km^{2})

Population (2013)
  - Total: 81
  - Density: 57/sq mi (22/km^{2})
- Time zone: UTC+1 (CET)
  - Summer (DST): UTC+2 (CEST)

Gajine (Serbian: Гајине) is a village in the municipality of Ilijaš, Bosnia and Herzegovina.

== Demographics ==
According to the 2013 census, its population was 81.

Ethnicity in 2013
Ethnicity	Number	Percentage
Bosniaks	79	97.5%
Serbs	2	2.5%
Total	81	100%
