= Lješevo =

Lješevo =
- Village
- Location within Bosnia and Herzegovina
- Coordinates: 43°59′21″N 18°14′18″E
- Country: Bosnia and Herzegovina
- Entity: Federation of Bosnia and Herzegovina
- Canton: Sarajevo
- Municipality: Ilijaš

Area
  - Total: 0.86 sq mi (2.24 km^{2})

Population (2013)
  - Total: 973
  - Density: 1,130/sq mi (434/km^{2})
- Time zone: UTC+1 (CET)
  - Summer (DST): UTC+2 (CEST)

Lješevo is a village in the municipality of Ilijaš, Bosnia and Herzegovina.

== Demographics ==
According to the 2013 census, its population was 973.

Ethnicity in 2013
Ethnicity	Number	Percentage
Bosniaks	954	98.0%
Croats	8	0.8%
other/undeclared	11	1.1%
Total	973	100%
