= Gornji Čevljanovići =

- Village
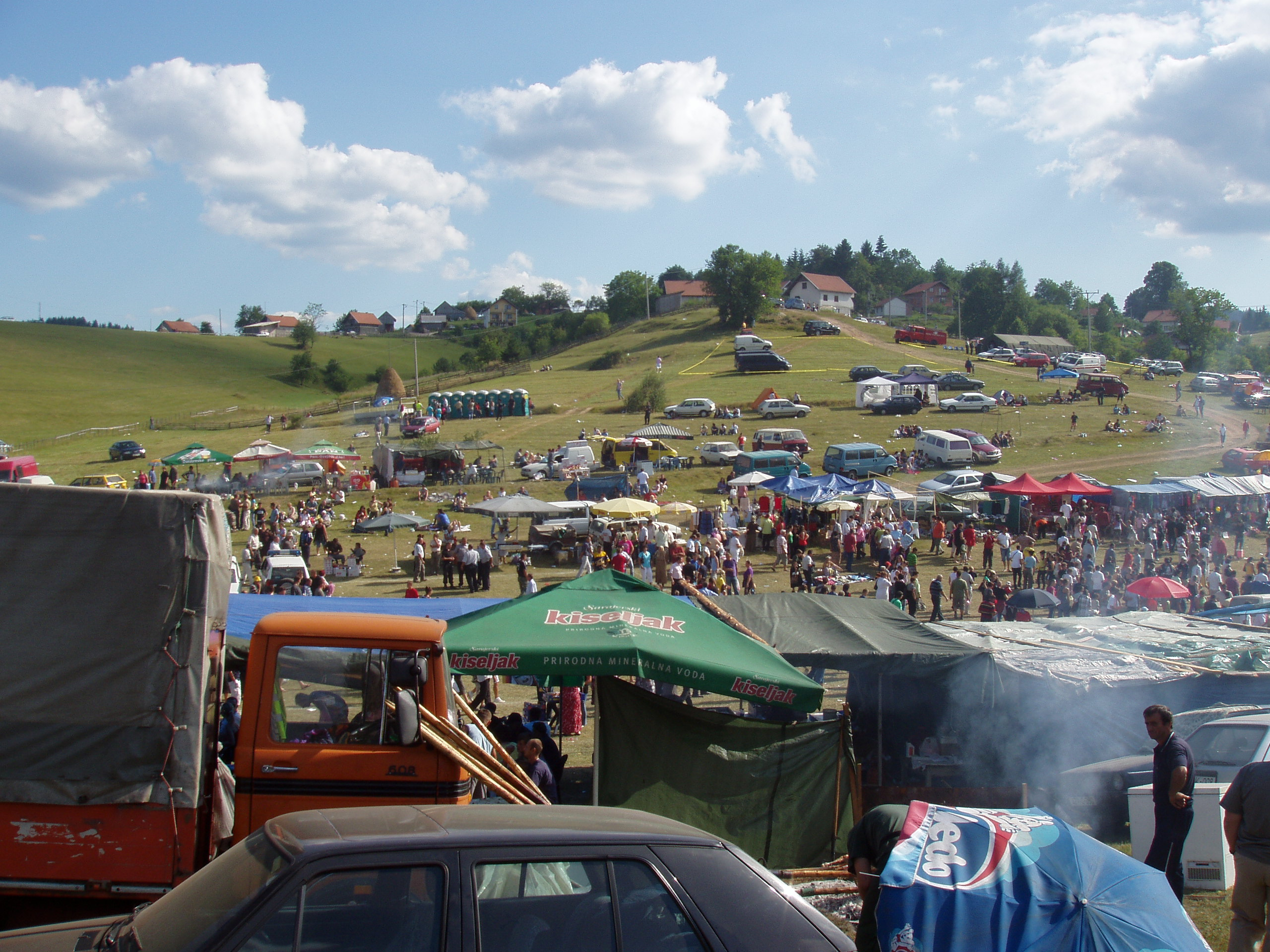

- Location within Bosnia and Herzegovina
- Coordinates: 44°02′25″N 18°30′37″E
- Country: Bosnia and Herzegovina
- Entity: Federation of Bosnia and Herzegovina
- Canton: Sarajevo
- Municipality: Ilijaš

Area
  - Total: 0.56 sq mi (1.46 km^{2})

Population (2013)
  - Total: 76
  - Density: 130/sq mi (52/km^{2})
- Time zone: UTC+1 (CET)
  - Summer (DST): UTC+2 (CEST)

Gornji Čevljanovići is a village in the municipality of Ilijaš, Bosnia and Herzegovina.

== Demographics ==
According to the 2013 census, its population was 76, all Bosniaks.
