= Hreša =

Hreša Хреша
- Village
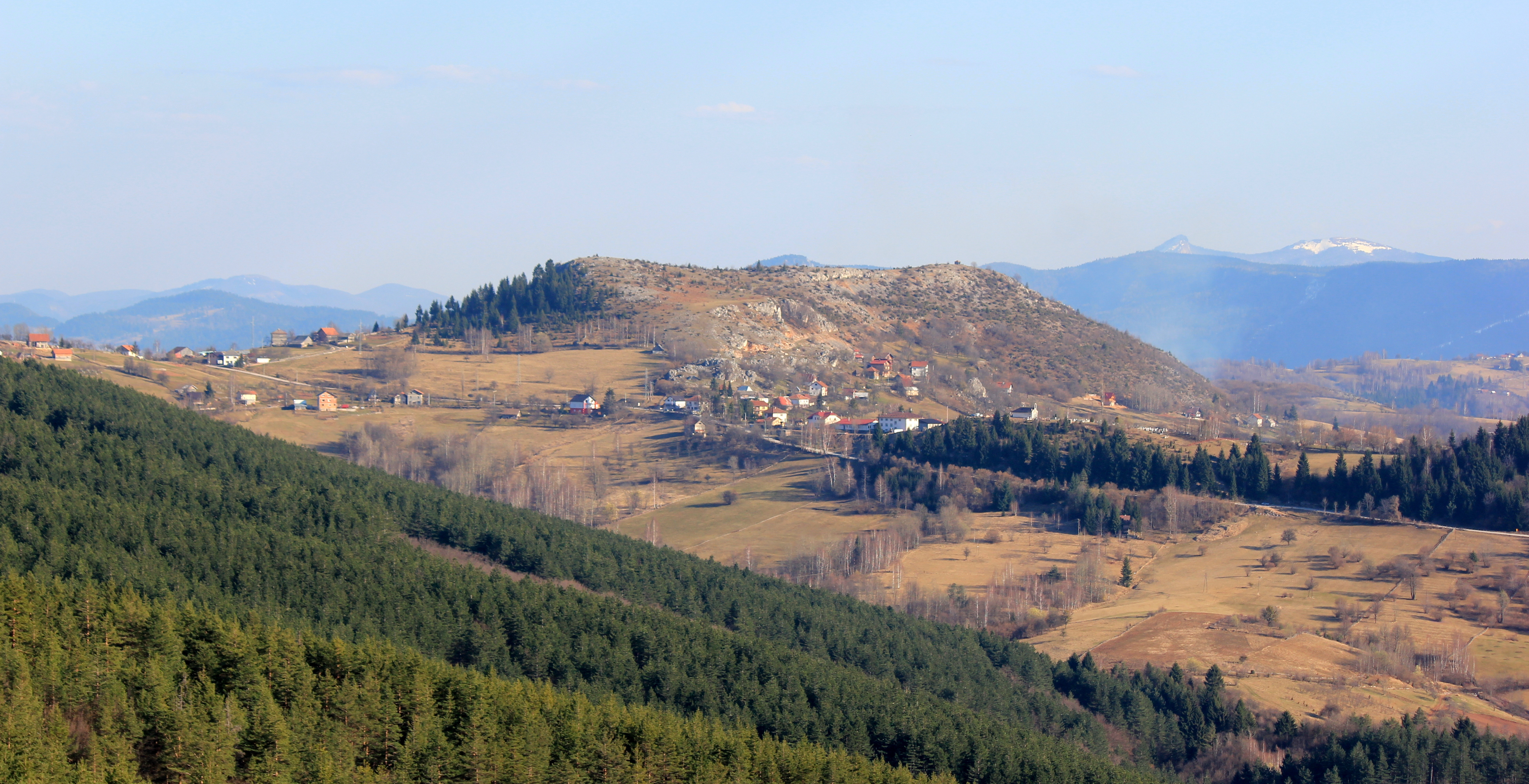

- Location within Bosnia and Herzegovina
- Country: Bosnia and Herzegovina
- Entity: Republika Srpska
- Region: Istočno Sarajevo
- Municipality: Istočni Stari Grad

Area
  - Total: 3.69 sq mi (9.57 km^{2})

Population (2013)
  - Total: 214
  - Density: 57.9/sq mi (22.4/km^{2})
- Time zone: UTC+1 (CET)
  - Summer (DST): UTC+2 (CEST)

Hreša (Serbian Cyrillic: Хреша) is a village near Sarajevo, the capital of Bosnia and Herzegovina. Hreša is in Istočni Stari Grad (Cyrillic: Источни Стари Град), municipality of the city of Istočno Sarajevo, Republika Srpska, Bosnia and Herzegovina. It was also known as Srpski Stari Grad (Cyrillic: Српски Стари Град), and was created from part of the pre-war municipality of Stari Grad (the other part of the pre-war municipality is now in the Federation of Bosnia and Herzegovina). Hreša is the biggest place of Istočni Stari Grad (East Old Town).

== Demographics ==
Ethnicity in 2013
Ethnicity	Number	Percentage
Serbs	208	97.2%
Bosniaks	6	2.8%
Total	214	100%
