= Ivančići, Bosnia and Herzegovina =

Ivančići
- Village
- Location within Bosnia and Herzegovina
- Coordinates: 44°03′06″N 18°28′26″E
- Country: Bosnia and Herzegovina
- Entity: Federation of Bosnia and Herzegovina
- Canton: Sarajevo
- Municipality: Ilijaš

Area
  - Total: 0.83 sq mi (2.14 km^{2})

Population (2013)
  - Total: 135
  - Density: 163/sq mi (63.1/km^{2})
- Time zone: UTC+1 (CET)
  - Summer (DST): UTC+2 (CEST)

Ivančići is a village in the municipality of Ilijaš, Bosnia and Herzegovina.

== History ==
In early January 1942, during the World War II in Yugoslavia, leader of Yugoslav Partisans Josip Broz Tito organized the Communist Party of Yugoslavia council at which he gave instructions on decisive fight against the Četnik forces. His instructions were subsequently criticized by the Comintern which insisted on the "wide liberation front" leading to subsequent change in policy in Foča on 4 April 1942.

== Demographics ==
According to the 2013 census, its population was 135.

Ethnicity in 2013
Ethnicity	Number	Percentage
Bosniaks	132	97.8%
other/undeclared	3	2.2%
Total	135	100%
