= Donji Čevljanovići =

Donji Čevljanovići Доњи Чевљановићи
- Village
- Location within Bosnia and Herzegovina
- Coordinates: 44°02′N 18°27′E
- Country: Bosnia and Herzegovina
- Entity: Federation of Bosnia and Herzegovina
- Canton: Sarajevo
- Municipality: Ilijaš

Area
  - Total: 0.69 sq mi (1.79 km^{2})

Population (2013)
  - Total: 91
  - Density: 130/sq mi (51/km^{2})
- Time zone: UTC+1 (CET)
  - Summer (DST): UTC+2 (CEST)

Donji Čevljanovići (Serbian: Доњи Чевљановићи) is a village in the municipality of Ilijaš, Bosnia and Herzegovina.

== Demographics ==
According to the 2013 census, its population was 91.

Ethnicity in 2013
| Ethnicity | Number | Percentage |
|---|---|---|
| Bosniaks | 86 | 94.5% |
| other/undeclared | 5 | 5.5% |
| Total | 91 | 100% |
