= Zlotege =

- Village
- Location within Bosnia and Herzegovina
- Coordinates: 44°04′N 18°29′E
- Country: Bosnia and Herzegovina
- Entity: Federation of Bosnia and Herzegovina
- Canton: Sarajevo
- Municipality: Ilijaš

Area
  - Total: 0.38 sq mi (0.99 km^{2})

Population (2013)
  - Total: 2
  - Density: 5.2/sq mi (2.0/km^{2})
- Time zone: UTC+1 (CET)
  - Summer (DST): UTC+2 (CEST)

Zlotege is a village in the municipality of Ilijaš, Bosnia and Herzegovina.

== Demographics ==
According to the 2013 census, its population was 2.

Ethnicity in 2013
Ethnicity	Number	Percentage
Bosniaks	1	50.0%
Serbs	1	50.0%
Total	2	100%
