= Donja Bioča (Ilijaš) =

- Village
- Location within Bosnia and Herzegovina
- Coordinates: 43°56′12″N 18°15′08″E
- Country: Bosnia and Herzegovina
- Entity: Federation of Bosnia and Herzegovina
- Canton: Sarajevo
- Municipality: Ilijaš

Area
  - Total: 1.03 sq mi (2.67 km^{2})

Population (2013)
  - Total: 106
  - Density: 103/sq mi (39.7/km^{2})
- Time zone: UTC+1 (CET)
  - Summer (DST): UTC+2 (CEST)

Donja Bioča is a village in the municipality of Ilijaš, Bosnia and Herzegovina.

== Demographics ==
According to the 2013 census, its population was 106.

Ethnicity in 2013
Ethnicity	Number	Percentage
Bosniaks	104	98.1%
Serbs	1	0.9%
other/undeclared	1	0.9%
Total	106	100%
