= Volcasso =

Ragusan noble family

The House of Volcasso or Volcassio was a Ragusan noble family.

== History ==
They are mentioned since the 13th century, and were one of the wealthiest families in the 14th century. It was extinct by 1372.

== Notable members ==
- Volcasso di Giovanni (fl. 1265), settled Ragusa.
- Pasqua de Bolchasso (fl. 1293), Ragusan diplomat in Venice.
- Pasque de Volcasso (fl. 1302).
- Zugno de Volchasso (fl. 1303).
- Goysclaua de Volcasso (fl. 1304), wife of Paolo Querini.
- Junius de Volcax (fl. 1313).
- Junius de Volcasso (fl. 1319).
- Junii de Volcasso (fl. 1340).
- Laurizza de Volcasso (fl. 1343–44).
- Matchi de Volcasso (fl. 1363).
- Laurentius de Volcasso/de Volcasio/Lorenzo de Volcaxo (fl. 1352–59), rector.
- Marini de Volchasso.
- Clementis de Vulchasso
- Vincenzo Volcasso.

== Annotations ==
Also spelt Volchasso, Bolchasso, Volcassio, Volcasio, Vulchasso, Volcax, Volcaxo. The name was derived from Slavic Vlkas, Vlkasović (Vukasović).

== Sources ==
- Zdenko Zlatar (1 January 1992). Our Kingdom Come: The Counter-Reformation, the Republic of Dubrovnik, and the Liberation of the Balkan Slavs. East European Monographs. pp. 34–37. ISBN 978-0-88033-239-2.
- Benyovsky Latin, Irena; Ledić, Stipe (2013). "Posjed obitelji Volcassio u srednjovjekovnom Dubrovniku". Anali Zavoda za Povijesne Znanosti Hrvatske Akademije Znanosti i Umjetnosti u Dubrovniku (in Croatian). 51 (51/1): 17–60. doi:10.21857/9e31lh48qm.
