= Četojevići =

Četojevići Четојевићи
- Village
- Location within Bosnia and Herzegovina
- Coordinates: 44°02′08″N 18°34′09″E
- Country: Bosnia and Herzegovina
- Entity: Federation of Bosnia and Herzegovina
- Canton: Sarajevo
- Municipality: Ilijaš

Area
  - Total: 1.57 sq mi (4.07 km^{2})

Population (2013)
  - Total: 0
  - Density: 0.0/sq mi (0.0/km^{2})
- Time zone: UTC+1 (CET)
  - Summer (DST): UTC+2 (CEST)

Četojevići (Serbian: Четојевићи) is a village in the municipality of Ilijaš, Bosnia and Herzegovina.

== Demographics ==
According to the 2013 census, its population was nil, down from 44 in 1991.
