= Vladojevići =

- Village
- Location within Bosnia and Herzegovina
- Coordinates: 44°02′35″N 18°35′10″E
- Country: Bosnia and Herzegovina
- Entity: Federation of Bosnia and Herzegovina
- Canton: Sarajevo
- Municipality: Ilijaš

Area
  - Total: 2.09 sq mi (5.42 km^{2})

Population (2013)
  - Total: 66
  - Density: 32/sq mi (12/km^{2})
- Time zone: UTC+1 (CET)
  - Summer (DST): UTC+2 (CEST)

Vladojevići is a village in the municipality of Ilijaš, Bosnia and Herzegovina.

== Demographics ==
According to the 2013 census, its population was 66, all Bosniaks.
