= Mrakovo (Ilijaš) =

- Village
- Location within Bosnia and Herzegovina
- Coordinates: 43°57′59″N 18°16′48″E
- Country: Bosnia and Herzegovina
- Entity: Federation of Bosnia and Herzegovina
- Canton: Sarajevo
- Municipality: Ilijaš

Area
  - Total: 1.37 sq mi (3.56 km^{2})

Population (2013)
  - Total: 2,666
  - Density: 1,940/sq mi (749/km^{2})
- Time zone: UTC+1 (CET)
  - Summer (DST): UTC+2 (CEST)

Mrakovo is a village in the municipality of Ilijaš, Bosnia and Herzegovina.

== Demographics ==
According to the 2013 census, its population was 2,666.

Ethnicity in 2013
| Ethnicity | Number | Percentage |
|---|---|---|
| Bosniaks | 2,582 | 96.8% |
| Serbs | 28 | 1.1% |
| Croats | 22 | 0.8% |
| other/undeclared | 34 | 1.3% |
| Total | 2,666 | 100% |
