= Stubline (Ilijaš) =

Stubline Стублине
- Village
- Location within Bosnia and Herzegovina
- Coordinates: 43°58′N 18°28′E
- Country: Bosnia and Herzegovina
- Entity: Federation of Bosnia and Herzegovina
- Canton: Sarajevo
- Municipality: Ilijaš

Area
  - Total: 1.31 sq mi (3.38 km^{2})

Population (2013)
  - Total: 4
  - Density: 3.1/sq mi (1.2/km^{2})
- Time zone: UTC+1 (CET)
  - Summer (DST): UTC+2 (CEST)

Stubline is a village in the municipality of Ilijaš, Bosnia and Herzegovina.

== Demographics ==
According to the 2013 census, its population was 4, all Serbs.
