= Dragoradi =

- Village
- Location within Bosnia and Herzegovina
- Coordinates: 44°03′26″N 18°34′51″E
- Country: Bosnia and Herzegovina
- Entity: Federation of Bosnia and Herzegovina
- Canton: Sarajevo
- Municipality: Ilijaš

Area
  - Total: 2.45 sq mi (6.35 km^{2})

Population (2013)
  - Total: 166
  - Density: 67.7/sq mi (26.1/km^{2})
- Time zone: UTC+1 (CET)
  - Summer (DST): UTC+2 (CEST)

Dragoradi is a village in the municipality of Ilijaš, Bosnia and Herzegovina.

== Demographics ==
According to the 2013 census, its population was 166.

Ethnicity in 2013
Ethnicity	Number	Percentage
Bosniaks	157	94.6%
other/undeclared	9	5.4%
Total	166	100%
