= Vlaškovo =

- Village
- Location within Bosnia and Herzegovina
- Coordinates: 43°57′N 18°17′E
- Country: Bosnia and Herzegovina
- Entity: Federation of Bosnia and Herzegovina
- Canton: Sarajevo
- Municipality: Ilijaš

Area
  - Total: 0.47 sq mi (1.22 km^{2})

Population (2013)
  - Total: 388
  - Density: 824/sq mi (318/km^{2})
- Time zone: UTC+1 (CET)
  - Summer (DST): UTC+2 (CEST)

Vlaškovo is a village in the municipality of Ilijaš, Bosnia and Herzegovina.

== Demographics ==
According to the 2013 census, its population was 388.

Ethnicity in 2013
Ethnicity	Number	Percentage
Bosniaks	380	97.9%
Croats	3	0.8%
other/undeclared	5	1.3%
Total	388	100%
