= Vrutci (Ilijaš) =

Vrutci Врутци
- Village
- Location within Bosnia and Herzegovina
- Coordinates: 44°01′41″N 18°31′54″E
- Country: Bosnia and Herzegovina
- Entity: Federation of Bosnia and Herzegovina
- Canton: Sarajevo
- Municipality: Ilijaš

Area
  - Total: 2.41 sq mi (6.25 km^{2})

Population (2013)
  - Total: 98
  - Density: 41/sq mi (16/km^{2})
- Time zone: UTC+1 (CET)
  - Summer (DST): UTC+2 (CEST)

Vrutci is a village in the municipality of Ilijaš, Bosnia and Herzegovina.

== Demographics ==
According to the 2013 census, its population was 98.

Ethnicity in 2013
Ethnicity	Number	Percentage
Bosniaks	97	99.0%
other/undeclared	1	1.0%
Total	98	100%
