= Buljetovina =

Buljetovina Буљетовина
- Village
- Location within Bosnia and Herzegovina
- Coordinates: 44°04′25″N 18°27′02″E
- Country: Bosnia and Herzegovina
- Entity: Federation of Bosnia and Herzegovina
- Canton: Sarajevo
- Municipality: Ilijaš

Area
  - Total: 1.02 sq mi (2.65 km^{2})

Population (2013)
  - Total: 9
  - Density: 8.8/sq mi (3.4/km^{2})
- Time zone: UTC+1 (CET)
  - Summer (DST): UTC+2 (CEST)

Buljetovina (Serbian: Буљетовина) is a village in the municipality of Ilijaš, Bosnia and Herzegovina.

== Demographics ==
According to the 2013 census, its population was 9, all Serbs.
