= Radio Visoko =

Bosnian radio station

Visoko; Bosnia and Herzegovina
- Broadcast area: Zenica-Doboj Canton; Central Bosnia area
- Frequency: Visoko 92.3 MHz
- Branding: Public

Programming
- Language: Bosnian language
- Format: Local news, talk and music

Ownership
- Sister stations: RTV Visoko

History
- First air date: July 26, 1977
- Former call signs: R VISOKO

Technical information
- Transmitter coordinates: 43°59′N 18°10′E
- Repeater: Visoko/Kruščica

Links
- Webcast: On website
- Website: www.visoko-rtv.ba

Radio Visoko is a Bosnian local public radio station, broadcasting from Visoko, Bosnia and Herzegovina. It broadcasts a variety of programs such as news, music, morning and talk shows. Program is operated by RTV Visoko and it is mainly produced in Bosnian language.

== History ==
Radio Visoko was launched on 26 July 1977 as local/municipal Radio Sarajevo network affiliate.

When war in Bosnia and Herzegovina started, in 1992, sister company Television Visoko (now RTV Visoko) was founded. With the establishment of the new national public service broadcaster RTVBiH - Radio BiH (now BHRT - BH Radio 1) radio stations from the former Radio Sarajevo 2 local network generally continued to operate as local public radio stations under the jurisdiction of local authorities in Bosnia and Herzegovina (municipalities, cantons).

Since there was optical visibility of the Transmitter on the hill Kula Banjer (near Visoko) and Sarajevo's Hum Tower (Bosnian: Toranj Hum / Predajnik Hum), TV Link was installed as the only media connection of other, then free parts of Bosnia and Herzegovina with the then besieged Sarajevo.

The first TV show broadcast was about the damage caused by the shelling of Visoko on July 13, 1992. In addition to informative news shows and rebroadcasts of the TV Sarajevo (later Radio and Television of BiH) programs, a "TV School at a distance" (Bosnian: TV škola na daljinu) was also broadcast on TV Visoko during the war, which enabled primary and secondary school students to watch classes during the 1992/1993. and 1993/1994. school years.

Radio Visoko continued to operate as a municipal radio station within RTV Visoko.

Estimated number of potential listeners of Radio Visoko in Zenica-Doboj Canton, parts of Sarajevo Canton and Central Bosnia area is around 63.874

This radiostation is also available via internet and via IPTV platform in BiH (Moja TV - Channel 197).

== Frequencies ==
- Visoko 92.3 MHz

== See also ==
- List of radio stations in Bosnia and Herzegovina
- Radio Ilijaš
- Radio Zenica
