= Gornja Misoča =

- Village
- Location within Bosnia and Herzegovina
- Coordinates: 43°57′15″N 18°18′07″E
- Country: Bosnia and Herzegovina
- Entity: Federation of Bosnia and Herzegovina
- Canton: Sarajevo
- Municipality: Ilijaš

Area
  - Total: 3.06 sq mi (7.92 km^{2})

Population (2013)
  - Total: 365
  - Density: 119/sq mi (46.1/km^{2})
- Time zone: UTC+1 (CET)
  - Summer (DST): UTC+2 (CEST)

Gornja Misoča is a village in the municipality of Ilijaš, Bosnia and Herzegovina.

== Demographics ==
According to the 2013 census, its population was 365.

Ethnicity in 2013
Ethnicity	Number	Percentage
Bosniaks	361	98.9%
other/undeclared	4	1.1%
Total	365	100%
