= Šabanci (Ilijaš) =

- Village
- Location within Bosnia and Herzegovina
- Coordinates: 44°03′23″N 18°30′24″E
- Count: Bosnia and Herzegovina
- Entity: Federation of Bosnia and Herzegovina
- Canton: Sarajevo
- Municipality: Ilijaš

Area
  - Total: 1.88 sq mi (4.86 km^{2})

Population (2013)
  - Total: 4
  - Density: 2.1/sq mi (0.82/km^{2})
- Time zone: UTC+1 (CET)
  - Summer (DST): UTC+2 (CEST)

Šabanci is a village in the municipality of Ilijaš, Bosnia and Herzegovina.

== Demographics ==
According to the 2013 census, its population was 4, all Serbs.
