= Homar =

- Village
- Location within Bosnia and Herzegovina
- Coordinates: 44°00′39″N 18°30′52″E
- Country: Bosnia and Herzegovina
- Entity: Federation of Bosnia and Herzegovina
- Canton: Sarajevo
- Municipality: Ilijaš

Area
  - Total: 3.01 sq mi (7.80 km^{2})

Population (2013)
  - Total: 59
  - Density: 20/sq mi (7.6/km^{2})
- Time zone: UTC+1 (CET)
  - Summer (DST): UTC+2 (CEST)

Homar is a village in the municipality of Ilijaš, Bosnia and Herzegovina.

== Demographics ==
According to the 2013 census, its population was 59, all Bosniaks.
