= Donje Selo, Danilovgrad =

Donje Selo Доње Село
- Village
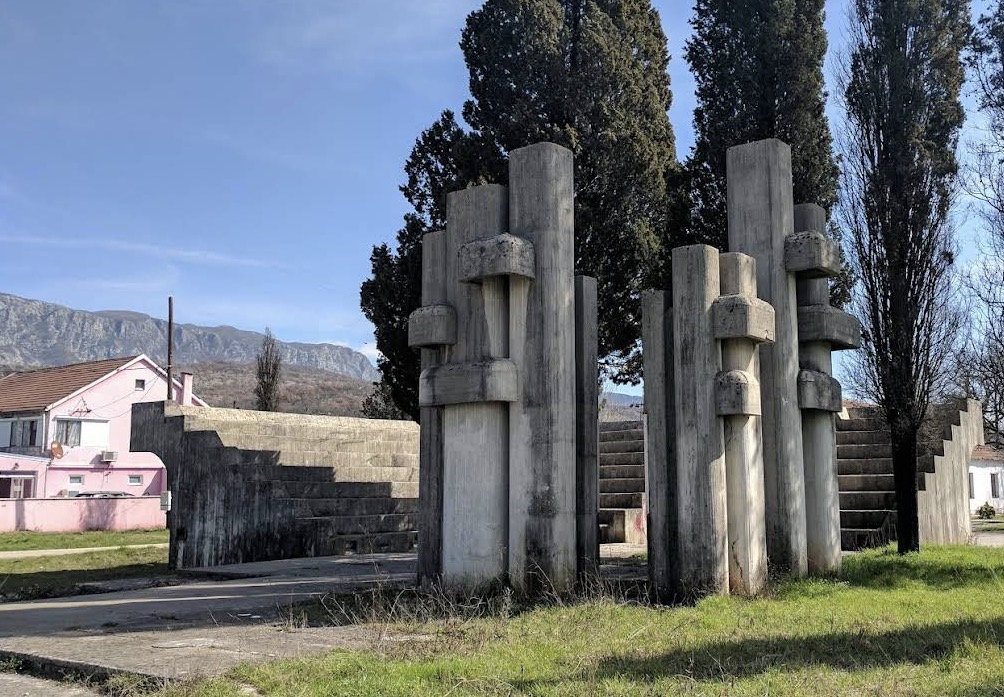
- Monument to the National Liberation Struggle located in the village

- Location within Montenegro
- Coordinates: 42.547361°N 19.167285°E
- Country: Montenegro
- Municipality: Danilovgrad

Population (2011)
  - Total: 399
- Time zone: UTC+1 (CET)
  - Summer (DST): UTC+2 (CEST)

Donje Selo (Montenegrin Cyrillic: Доње Село) is a village in the municipality of Danilovgrad, Montenegro.

== Demographics ==
According to the 2011 census, its population was 399.

Ethnicity in 2011
Ethnicity	Number	Percentage
Montenegrins	255	63.9%
Serbs	94	23.6%
other/undeclared	50	12.5%
Total	399	100%
