= Donja Misoča =

Donja Misoča Доња Мисоча
- Village
- Location within Bosnia and Herzegovina
- Coordinates: 43°57′N 18°17′E
- Country: Bosnia and Herzegovina
- Entity: Federation of Bosnia and Herzegovina
- Canton: Sarajevo
- Municipality: Ilijaš

Area
  - Total: 1.02 sq mi (2.63 km^{2})

Population (2013)
  - Total: 441
  - Density: 434/sq mi (168/km^{2})
- Time zone: UTC+1 (CET)
  - Summer (DST): UTC+2 (CEST)

Donja Misoča (Serbian: Доња Мисоча) is a village in the municipality of Ilijaš, Bosnia and Herzegovina.

== Demographics ==
According to the 2013 census, its population was 441.

Ethnicity in 2013
Ethnicity	Number	Percentage
Bosniaks	439	99.5%
Serbs	2	0.5%
Total	441	100%
