= Radio Ilijaš =

Bosnian radio station

Ilijaš; Bosnia and Herzegovina
- Broadcast area: Sarajevo Canton
- Frequency: Ilijaš 89.7 MHz
- Branding: Public

Programming
- Language: Bosnian language
- Format: Local news, talk and music

Ownership
- Owner: Javna Ustanova "Kulturno-sportski centar i Radio Ilijaš"

History
- First air date: April 6, 1978
- Call sign meaning: R.ILIJAS

Technical information
- Transmitter coordinates: 43°57′N 18°16′E
- Repeaters: Ilijaš/Kadarići; Vareš/Veakovac

Links
- Webcast: On website
- Website: radioilijas.ba

Radio Ilijaš is a Bosnian local public radio station, broadcasting from Ilijaš, Bosnia and Herzegovina.

Radio Ilijaš was launched on 6 April 1978 by the municipal council of Ilijaš. In Yugoslavia and in SR Bosnia and Herzegovina, it was part of local/municipal Radio Sarajevo network affiliate. This radio station broadcasts a variety of programs such as music, sport, local news and talk shows. Program is mainly produced in Bosnian language.

Estimated number of potential listeners of Radio Ilijaš is around 57,793. Radiostation is also available in Sarajevo (Sarajevo Canton region) and in municipalities : Vareš, Visoko and Breza.

== Frequencies ==
The program is currently broadcast at 3 frequencies:

- Ilijaš 89.7 MHz
- Vareš 100.9 MHz
- Ilijaš 102.7 MHz

== See also ==
- List of radio stations in Bosnia and Herzegovina
