= Lađevići (Ilijaš) =

Lađevići Лађевићи
- Village
- Location within Bosnia and Herzegovina
- Coordinates: 44°03′19″N 18°26′10″E
- Country: Bosnia and Herzegovina
- Entity: Federation of Bosnia and Herzegovina
- Canton: Sarajevo
- Municipality: Ilijaš

Area
  - Total: 1.73 sq mi (4.48 km^{2})

Population (2013)
  - Total: 6
  - Density: 3.5/sq mi (1.3/km^{2})
- Time zone: UTC+1 (CET)
  - Summer (DST): UTC+2 (CEST)

Lađevići (Serbian: Лађевићи) is a village in the municipality of Ilijaš, Bosnia and Herzegovina.

== Demographics ==
According to the 2013 census, its population was 6.

Ethnicity in 2013
Ethnicity	Number	Percentage
Bosniaks	5	83.3%
Serbs	1	16.7%
Total	6	100%
