= Pribinić noble family =

Radosalić Radojević
- Noble house Vlasteličićs, transl. Minor Lords
- Parent house: Pribinić
- Country: Banate of Bosnia & Kingdom of Bosnia
- Current region: župa Lepenica
- Etymology: patronymic
- Founded: before 1353
- Founder: Brajko, first known chieftain
- Final head: Dragić Radičević
- Seat: Lepenica
- Titles: Knyazs later Grand Knyazs
- Estates: Fojnica, Kreševo, Kiseljak
- Dissolution: last mentioned 1426 most likely with Ottoman conquest
- Cadet branches: Radojević; Mirković

The Pribinić family, also Radosalić family or Radosalić–Pribinić family, were a prominent medieval Bosnian noble family, a holder of the hereditary honor, which ruled over the medieval župa of Lepenica, a part of the medieval Bosnian state. Župa Lepenica was located in central Bosnia and included modern day's towns of Kiseljak, Fojnica and Kreševo. The Lepenica was mentioned for the first time in 1244 in the charter of the Hungarian king Bela IV, along with other parishes that existed in the area of central Bosnia.

Known members of this family and their genealogy can be established by their appearance in Bosnian medieval state charters. Only seven members of this family are known. All of them were members of the stanak, that is, the assembly of nobility and the state council and close associates of the ruler.

They are recorded on the ruling charters of the kings Tvrtko I, Dabiša, Ostoja and Tvrtko II.

== Stećak of Radoje ==
On the stećak, designated by the commission to preserve monuments of Bosnia and Herzegovina as No. 2, in the protected necropolis in Zabrđe, there is well-preserved relief of the coat of arms, along with an inscription, an epitaph to the Bosnian Grand Knyaz, Radoje Radosalić Pribinić.

Inscription is written in Bosnian Cyrillic and reads:

In original Bosnian Cyrillic:

чѣє ӡɖʌʍєɴнѣє кɴєӡɖ ϸɖΔоѣɖ Вєʌнкогɖ кɴєӡɖ босɖɴског ɖ посmɖВнѣєгɖ чнɴ ɴѣєгоВ кɴєӡ ϸɖΔнω ӡ божнѣоʍ поʍоvɣ н с□онѣχ Вѣєϸɴнχ ɖ с нɴоʍ ɴнѣєΔɴоʍ поʍоvɣ ɴєго сɖʍ оɴ

In Latin script:

sje zalmenije kneza radoja velikoga kneza bosanskog a postavijega sin njegov knez radič z božjom pomoču i svojih vjernih a s inom nijednom pomoču nego on sam

In English:

this memorial gravestone of prince Radoje, Grand Knyaz of Bosnia, laid down by his son knyaz Radič, by God's grace, and by his own faithful, and with no other help than himself

== Family lineage ==
According to the inscription, the stećak was laid down and inscribed by his son, Prince and Knyaz Radič.

- Brajko, was župan from the first generation of Pribinić and appears in 6 charters between 1353 and 1392;
- Vukota, knyaz, appears in 3 charters between 1367 and 1395;
  - Vukac Vukotić, grandson of Vukota, who appears in charters from 1419 and 1426;
- Radosav, župan, koji se pojavljuje u dvije povelje iz 1378. i 1392. godine).
  - Radoje Radosalić, son of Radosav, župan, and later Grand Knyaz of Bosnia, appearing on 6 charters in the period from 1392 to 1408;
    - Radič Radojević, son of Radoj, prince and knyaz, signatory on charters from 1417 and 1420 (died between 1420 and 1426);
      - Dragić Radičević, son of Radič, the last known member of this family, who appears on the charter of King Tvrtko II dated 7 October 1426.

== Bibliography ==
- Pavao Anđelić, Srednji vijek - doba stare bosanske države. In: Visoko i okolina kroz historiju 1, SO Visoko, Visoko, 1984, pp. 102–297
- Marko Vego, Zbornik srednjovjekovnih natpisa Bosne i Hercegovine. IV, Zemaljski muzej u Sarajevu, Sarajevo, 1970.
- Pavao Anđelić, Arheološka ispitivanja. In: Lepenica priroda, stanovništvo, privreda i zdravlje. Naučno društvo Bosne i Hercegovine, posebna izdanja, knjiga III, Sarajevo, 1963, pp. 151–191
- Есад Куртовић, Радосалићи - примјер једнократних презимена средњега вијека [Radosalić - An example of the „One-off“ surnames in the Middle Ages], Историјски институт, Београд 2009.
