= Kadarići (Vareš) =

Village in Vareš, Bosnia and Herzegovina

Kadarići Кадарићи
- Village
- Location within Bosnia and Herzegovina
- Country: Bosnia and Herzegovina
- Entity: Federation of Bosnia and Herzegovina
- Canton: Zenica-Doboj
- Municipality: Vareš

Area
  - Total: 1.65 sq mi (4.28 km^{2})

Population (2013)
  - Total: 118
  - Density: 71.4/sq mi (27.6/km^{2})
- Time zone: UTC+1 (CET)
  - Summer (DST): UTC+2 (CEST)

Kadarići (in Cyrillic: Кадарићи) is a village in Bosnia-Herzegovina. It is located in the municipality of Vareš, in the Zenica-Doboj Canton.

== Demographics ==
The population in the 1991 census was 201, the majority of whom were Muslims (Bosniaks).

According to the 2013 census, its population was 118.

Ethnicity in 2013
Ethnicity	Number	Percentage
Bosniaks	116	98.3%
other/undeclared	2	1.7%
Total	118	100%
