= Duboki Potok (Ilijaš) =

Duboki Potok Дубоки Поток
- Village
- Location within Bosnia and Herzegovina
- Coordinates: 44°03′12″N 18°27′12″E
- Country: Bosnia and Herzegovina
- Entity: Federation of Bosnia and Herzegovina
- Canton: Sarajevo
- Municipality: Ilijaš

Area
  - Total: 0.55 sq mi (1.42 km^{2})

Population (2013)
  - Total: 2
  - Density: 3.6/sq mi (1.4/km^{2})
- Time zone: UTC+1 (CET)
  - Summer (DST): UTC+2 (CEST)

Duboki Potok (Serbian: Дубоки Поток) is a village in the municipality of Ilijaš, Bosnia and Herzegovina.

== Demographics ==
According to the 2013 census, its population was 2, both Croats.
