= Karaula (Ilijaš) =

- Village
- Location within Bosnia and Herzegovina
- Coordinates: 43°56′47″N 18°18′15″E
- Country: Bosnia and Herzegovina
- Municipality: Ilijaš
- Time zone: UTC+1 (CET)
  - Summer (DST): UTC+2 (CEST)

Karaula is a village in the municipality of Ilijaš, Bosnia and Herzegovina.
