= Solakovići =

- Village
- Location within Bosnia and Herzegovina
- Coordinates: 43°59′17″N 18°22′24″E
- Country: Bosnia and Herzegovina
- Entity: Federation of Bosnia and Herzegovina
- Canton: Sarajevo
- Municipality: Ilijaš

Area
  - Total: 1.05 sq mi (2.72 km^{2})

Population (2013)
  - Total: 199
  - Density: 189/sq mi (73.2/km^{2})
- Time zone: UTC+1 (CET)
  - Summer (DST): UTC+2 (CEST)

Solakovići is a village in the municipality of Ilijaš, Bosnia and Herzegovina.

== Demographics ==
According to the 2013 census, its population was 199.

Ethnicity in 2013
Ethnicity	Number	Percentage
Bosniaks	160	80.4%
Croats	32	16.1%
Serbs	3	1.5%
other/undeclared	4	2.0%
Total	199	100%
