= Draževići (Ilijaš) =

Draževići Дражевићи
- Village
- Location within Bosnia and Herzegovina
- Coordinates: 44°01′03″N 18°29′19″E
- Country: Bosnia and Herzegovina
- Entity: Federation of Bosnia and Herzegovina
- Canton: Sarajevo
- Municipality: Ilijaš

Area
  - Total: 1.52 sq mi (3.94 km^{2})

Population (2013)
  - Total: 2
  - Density: 1.3/sq mi (0.51/km^{2})
- Time zone: UTC+1 (CET)
  - Summer (DST): UTC+2 (CEST)

Draževići (Serbian: Дражевићи) is a village in the municipality of Ilijaš, Bosnia and Herzegovina.

== Demographics ==
According to the 2013 census, its population was 2, both Bosniaks.
