= Donje Selo (Ilijaš) =

Donje Selo Доње Село
- Village
- Location within Bosnia and Herzegovina
- Coordinates: 44°02′41″N 18°31′34″E
- Country: Bosnia and Herzegovina
- Entity: Federation of Bosnia and Herzegovina
- Canton: Sarajevo
- Municipality: Ilijaš

Area
  - Total: 0.91 sq mi (2.36 km^{2})

Population (2013)
  - Total: 109
  - Density: 120/sq mi (46.2/km^{2})
- Time zone: UTC+1 (CET)
  - Summer (DST): UTC+2 (CEST)

Donje Selo is a village in the municipality of Ilijaš, Bosnia and Herzegovina.

== Demographics ==
According to the 2013 census, its population was 109, all Bosniaks.
