= Srednje (Ilijaš) =

Srednje Средње
- Village
- Location within Bosnia and Herzegovina
- Coordinates: 43°59′34″N 18°25′35″E
- Country: Bosnia and Herzegovina
- Entity: Federation of Bosnia and Herzegovina
- Canton: Sarajevo
- Municipality: Ilijaš

Area
  - Total: 4.89 sq mi (12.67 km^{2})

Population (2013)
  - Total: 359
  - Density: 73.4/sq mi (28.3/km^{2})
- Time zone: UTC+1 (CET)
  - Summer (DST): UTC+2 (CEST)

Srednje (Bosnian: Srednje) is a village in the municipality of Ilijaš, Bosnia and Herzegovina.

== Demographics ==
According to the 2013 census, its population was 359.

Ethnicity in 2013
Ethnicity	Number	Percentage
Bosniaks	311	86.6%
Croats	20	5.6%
Serbs	12	3.3%
other/undeclared	16	4.5%
Total	359	100%
