= Kadarići (Ilijaš) =

Kadarići Кадарићи
- Village
- Location within Bosnia and Herzegovina
- Coordinates: 44°04′24″N 18°20′35″E
- Country: Bosnia and Herzegovina
- Entity: Federation of Bosnia and Herzegovina
- Canton: Sarajevo
- Municipality: Ilijaš

Area
  - Total: 1.34 sq mi (3.48 km^{2})

Population (2013)
  - Total: 481
  - Density: 358/sq mi (138/km^{2})
- Time zone: UTC+1 (CET)
  - Summer (DST): UTC+2 (CEST)

Kadarići (Cyrillic: Кадарићи) is a village in the municipality of Ilijaš, Bosnia and Herzegovina.

== Demographics ==
According to the 2013 census, its population was 481.

Ethnicity in 2013
Ethnicity	Number	Percentage
Bosniaks	465	96.7%
Serbs	5	1.0%
other/undeclared	11	2.3%
Total	481	100%
