= Ilijaš =

Town and municipality in Sarajevo Canton of the Federation of Bosnia and Herzegovina

Ilijaš Općina Ilijaš (Bosnian)
- Municipality
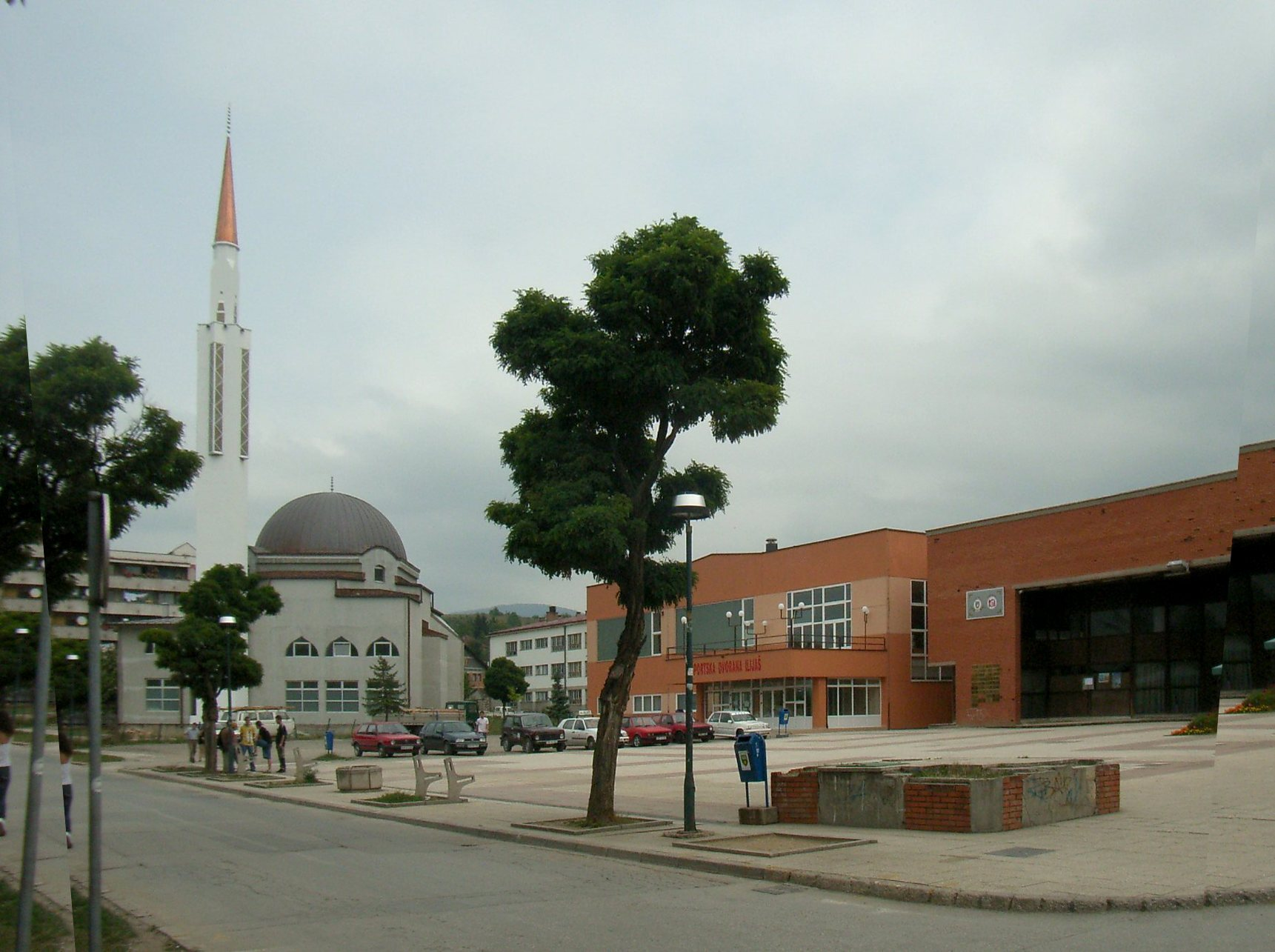
- View of the center of Ilijaš.

- Seal

- Location within Bosnia and Herzegovina
- Coordinates: 43°57′N 18°16′E
- Country: Bosnia and Herzegovina
- Entity: Federation of Bosnia and Herzegovina
- Canton: Sarajevo Canton

Government
  - Municipal mayor: Amar Dovadžija (NiP)

Area
  - Municipality: 308.6 km^{2} (119.2 sq mi)

Population (2013 census)
  - Municipality: 19,603
  - Density: 664/km^{2} (1,720/sq mi)
  - Urban: 4,921
- Time zone: UTC+1 (CET)
  - Summer (DST): UTC+2 (CEST)
- Area code: +387 33
- Website: ilijas.ba

Ilijaš is a town and municipality located in Sarajevo Canton of the Federation of Bosnia and Herzegovina, an entity of Bosnia and Herzegovina. It is located northwest of the inner city of Sarajevo, making it de facto a town and suburb of Sarajevo.

== History ==
The oldest traces of life in these areas date back to the Paleolithic era, as evidenced by the Bijambar Caves complex on the Crnorijek Plateau.

In the early Middle Ages close to the river Bosna and Vogoščica, the district Vogošća, or Vidogošća, was formed.

Between Olovo and Vareš, Srednji and Čevljanovići, on the vast plateau of the Crnorijek Plateau, there are rich deposits of iron, lead, manganese and mercury. Customs duties were levied in this area as early as 1384, and the ore was transported to Dubrovnik.

Some later events that are tied to the Ottoman period came to the formation of džemats, nahiyahs, and sanjaks. At the beginning of the nineteenth century, there were 20 džemats in the Sarajevo Nahiyah: Butmir, Kijevo, Presjenica, Sudići, Trnovo, Zijamet Crna Rijeka, Pale, Mokro with Bobogovićima, Kriva Rijeka, Srednje, Čifluk Crna Rijeka, Rakova Noga, Vogošća, Nahorevo, Kulijes, Rakovica, Hadžići, Drozgometva, Pazarić and the villages of Luka and Žeravica.

Ilijaš is home to the Serbian Orthodox Church of the Holy Prophet Elijah, which was built in the late 19th century.

The occupation of Bosnia and Herzegovina by the Austro-Hungarian Empire led to many changes which manifested in administrative and political changes. The territory of Bosnia and Herzegovina was divided into districts and further divided into counties. The counties were divided into municipalities, instead of džemats, and they were furthermore divided into mahallahs and hamlets while the functions of the muhtars and village chiefs remained the same. The modern municipality of Ilijaš at that time was divided into the Sarajevo and Visoko counties and the boundary line between those two counties was the Povučje stream and the hill Bukovac which was between the stream and Ljubina.

The natural resources of forests, ores, unused land and labor became particularly interesting during the Austro-Hungarian rule, when the first industrial enterprises were established, mines were opened, and railways were built.

In the first years of the occupation of Bosnia and Herzegovina by Austria-Hungary, mines were opened, and in 1880 the manganese mine "Bosna" in Čevljanovići came into existence, which met the needs of the Austro-Hungarian monarchy for many years.

The organized education system of the municipality is linked to the last years of the Austro-Hungarian rule in Bosnia and Herzegovina. The first school began operating in 1908 in Čevljanovići, it was called "" and was attended by the children of the miners of the manganese mine.

In September 1914, priest Tripko Maksimović and 18 peasants who were hostages on the Semizovac-Visoko railway were shot, a monument was erected to them in 1938.[2] (an article in "Politica" talks about 17 people being buried alive[3])

The administrative division of Bosnia and Herzegovina until the formation of bans in 1929 remained the same even during the Austro-Hungarian occupation. In 1922, oblasts were formed instead of districts.

In August 1939 "Jugočelik" began construction of a factory in this town.

After World War II and the liberation of the temporary national assembly of the Federal Bosnia and Herzegovina, the assembly's first session in August 1945 brought up the law of the territorial division of Bosnia and Herzegovina into districts, counties, and areas of local people's committees and their headquarters.

The Ilijaš Municipality was established in May 1952 with the organization of people's committees. Those local people's committees founded the local municipalities, which led to the self-management of the municipalities, including the municipality of Ilijaš.

Eight-year schools in Ilijaš and Ivančići began operating in the 1955/1956 school year, the school in Ljubina began operating in the 1960/61 school year, and then schools in Šići, Sirovine, Vukasovići, Bioča, Malešići, Karaula and Visojevica. In October 1969, a monument was erected to the 53 patriots killed in 1941.

In the 1991/92 school year, immediately before the war in Bosnia and Herzegovina, primary education was provided in the following primary schools: Primary School "27. jul" in Ilijaš, Primary School "Vlado Vuković" in Podlugovi and Primary School "Evgenije Spahić Željko" in Srednji and Podlipnik.

Mostly populated by Serbs population, the municipality was largely under the control of the Army of Republika Srpska from 1992 to 1996. With the Dayton Agreement, the municipality almost entirely belonged to the Federation of Bosnia and Herzegovina, and the Serb population, in fear, largely emigrated and settled throughout Republika Srpska and other countries.

== Demographics ==
The municipality of Ilijaš is composed of two parts, the town of Ilijaš and the upper municipality. The town of Ilijaš is composed of several localities. The biggest and most urban is the center and which has about 10,000 residents, the second is the Misoča settlement (Naselje Misoča), with 1,500 residents. Ethnically, there is a majority of Bosniaks with about 1,300 people, 250 are Serbs, 50 are Croats, with none classified as others. Other places, in the municipality of Ilijaš, are Podlugovi, Lješevo, Stari Ilijaš, and Malešići.

=== 1971 ===
According to the 1971 population census there were 23,007 residents.

- Serbs – 10,941 (47.55%)
- Bosniaks – 9,187 (39.93%)
- Croats – 2,172 (9.44%)
- Yugoslavs – 400 (1.73%)
- others – 307 (1.35%)

=== 1991 ===
According to the 1991 population census there were 25,184 residents.

- Serbs – 11,325 (44.96%)
- Bosniaks – 10,585 (42.03%)
- Croats – 1,736 (6.89%)
- Yugoslavs – 1,167 (4.63%)
- others – 371 (1.47%)

=== 2013 ===
According to the 2013 population census there were 19,603 residents, 4,921 of them in Ilijaš town.

- Bosniaks – 18,151 (92.6%)
- Serbs – 421 (2.1%)
- Croats – 382 (1.9%)
- others – 649 (3.3%)

== Settlements ==
- Balibegovići
- Banjer
- Bokšići
- Buljetovina
- Čemernica
- Četojevići
- Donja Bioča
- Donja Misoča
- Donje Selo
- Donji Čevljanovići
- Dragoradi
- Draževići
- Duboki Potok
- Duševine
- Gajevi
- Gajine
- Gojanovići
- Gornja Bioča
- Gornja Misoča
- Gornji Čevljanovići
- Hadžići
- Han Karaula
- Han Šići
- Homar
- Ilijaš
- Ivančići
- Kadarići
- Kamenica
- Karaula
- Korita
- Košare
- Kožlje
- Krčevine
- Krivajevići
- Kunosići
- Lađevići
- Lipnik
- Luka
- Luka kod Stublina
- Lješevo
- Ljubina
- Ljubnići
- Malešići
- Medojevići
- Moševići
- Mrakovo
- Nišići
- Odžak
- Ozren
- Podlipnik
- Podlugovi
- Popovići
- Rakova Noga
- Ribarići
- Rudnik Čevljanovići
- Solakovići
- Sovrle
- Srednje
- Stomorine
- Stubline
- Sudići
- Šabanci
- Taračin Do
- Velika Njiva
- Vidotina
- Vilić
- Visojevica
- Višnjica
- Vladojevići
- Vlaškovo
- Vrutci
- Vukasovići
- Zakutnica
- Zlotege

== Twin towns and sister cities ==
Ilijaš is twinned with:

- Bayraklı, Turkey

== See also ==
- Bijambare
- Misoča
- Sarajevo
- Sarajevo Canton
- Vukasovići
- Srednje
