= Istočni Stari Grad =

Municipality in Bosnia and Herzegovina

Istočni Stari Grad Источни Стари Град East Old Town
- Municipality
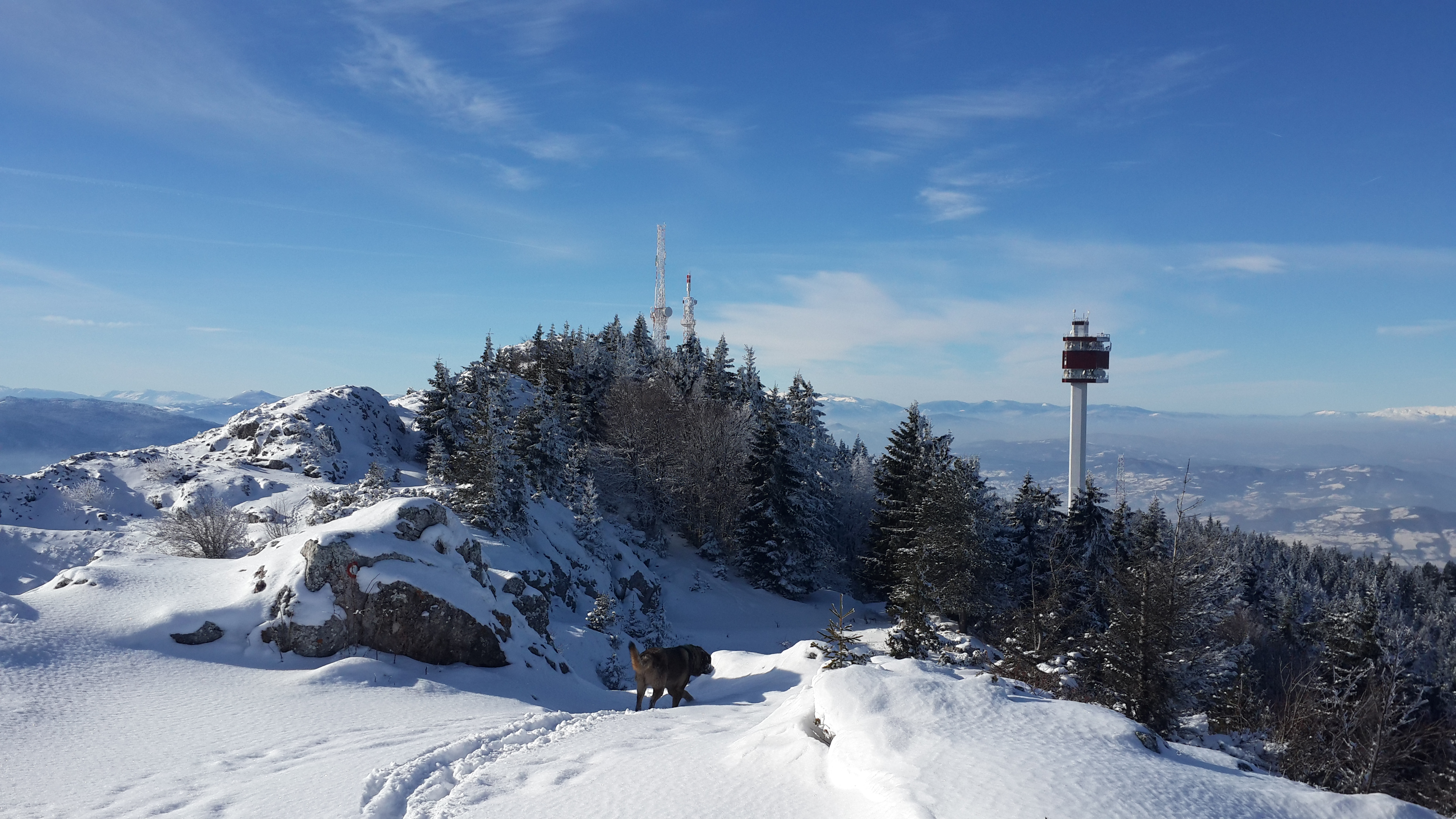

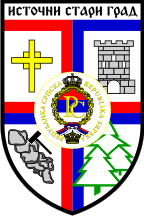
- Coat of arms

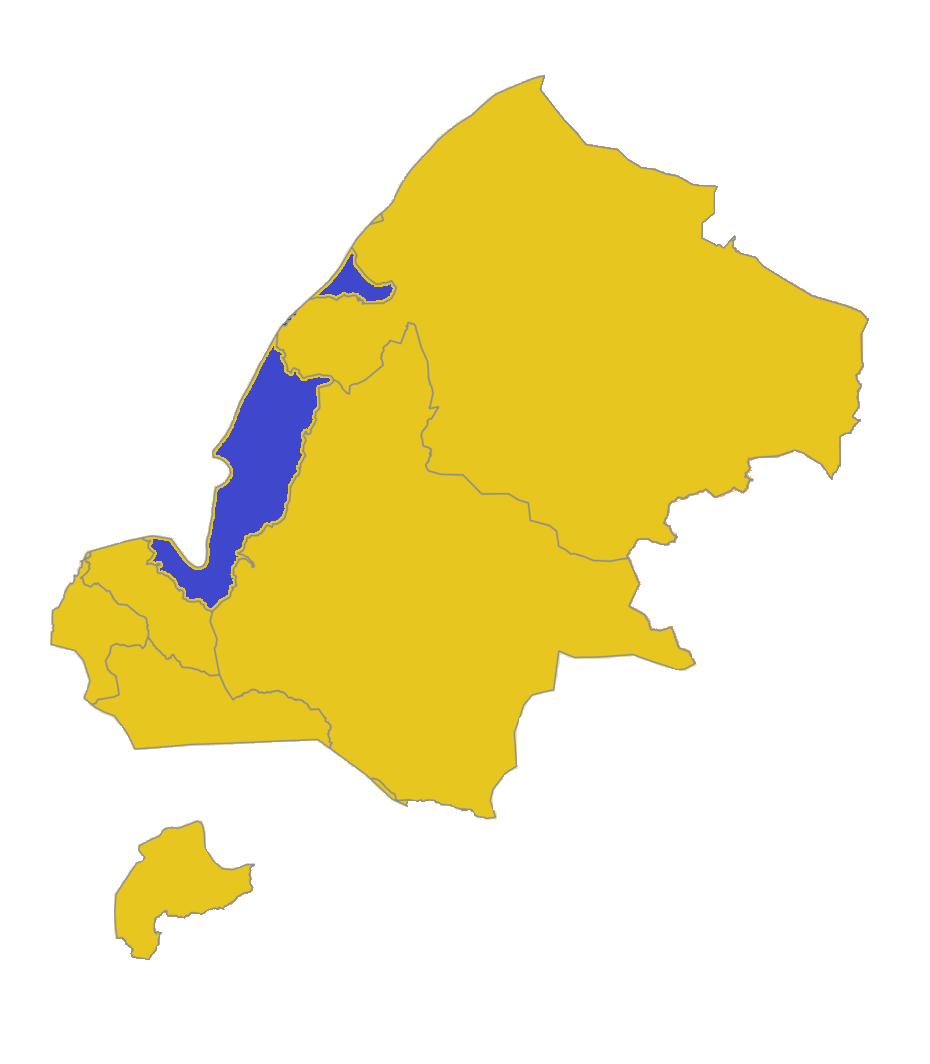
- Location of Istočni Stari Grad within the city of Istočno Sarajevo
- Coordinates: 43°51′22″N 18°29′00″E
- Country: Bosnia and Herzegovina
- Entity: Republika Srpska
- City: Istočno Sarajevo
- Status: Suburban

Government
  - Municipal mayor: Bojo Gašanović (SDS)

Area
  - Total: 69.84 km^{2} (26.97 sq mi)

Population (2013 census)
  - Total: 1,131
  - Density: 16.19/km^{2} (41.94/sq mi)
- Time zone: UTC+1 (CET)
  - Summer (DST): UTC+2 (CEST)
- Postal code: 71144
- Area code: +387 57
- Website: www.opstinaisg.net

Istočni Stari Grad (Serbian Cyrillic: Источни Стари Град, lit. "East Old Town") is a municipality of the city of Istočno Sarajevo, Republika Srpska, Bosnia and Herzegovina. As of 2013, it has a population of 1,131 inhabitants. The seat of municipality is Hreša.

== History ==
It was created with the signing Dayton Peace Agreement 1995 as Srpski Stari Grad (Serbian Old Town) from part of the pre-war municipality of Stari Grad (the other part of the pre-war municipality is now in the Canton Sarajevo in the Federation of Bosnia and Herzegovina). Following the decision on the name of the cities in 2004 by the Constitutional Court of Bosnia and Herzegovina, which outruled the use of the prefix Srpski (Serbian), the municipality 2005 was renamed Istočni Stari Grad (East Old Town). From 2004 to 2005 the municipality was used name Hreša.

== Demographics ==
=== Population ===
Population of settlements – Istočni Stari Grad municipality
	Settlement	1991.	2013.
	Total		1,131
1	Bulozi	278	258
2	Vučja Luka		256

=== Ethnic composition ===
Ethnic composition – Istočni Stari Grad municipality
	2013.
Total	1,131 (100,0%)
Serbs	1,071 (94,69%)
Bosniaks	43 (3,802%)
Others	10 (0,884%)
Croats	7 (0,619%)

== Municipal mayors ==
Municipal mayors were:

- Kosta Plakanović, SDS (1997 — 2004)
- Mlađenka Dragaš, PDP (2004 — 2008)
- Bojo Gašanović, SDS (2008 — present)

== Gallery ==
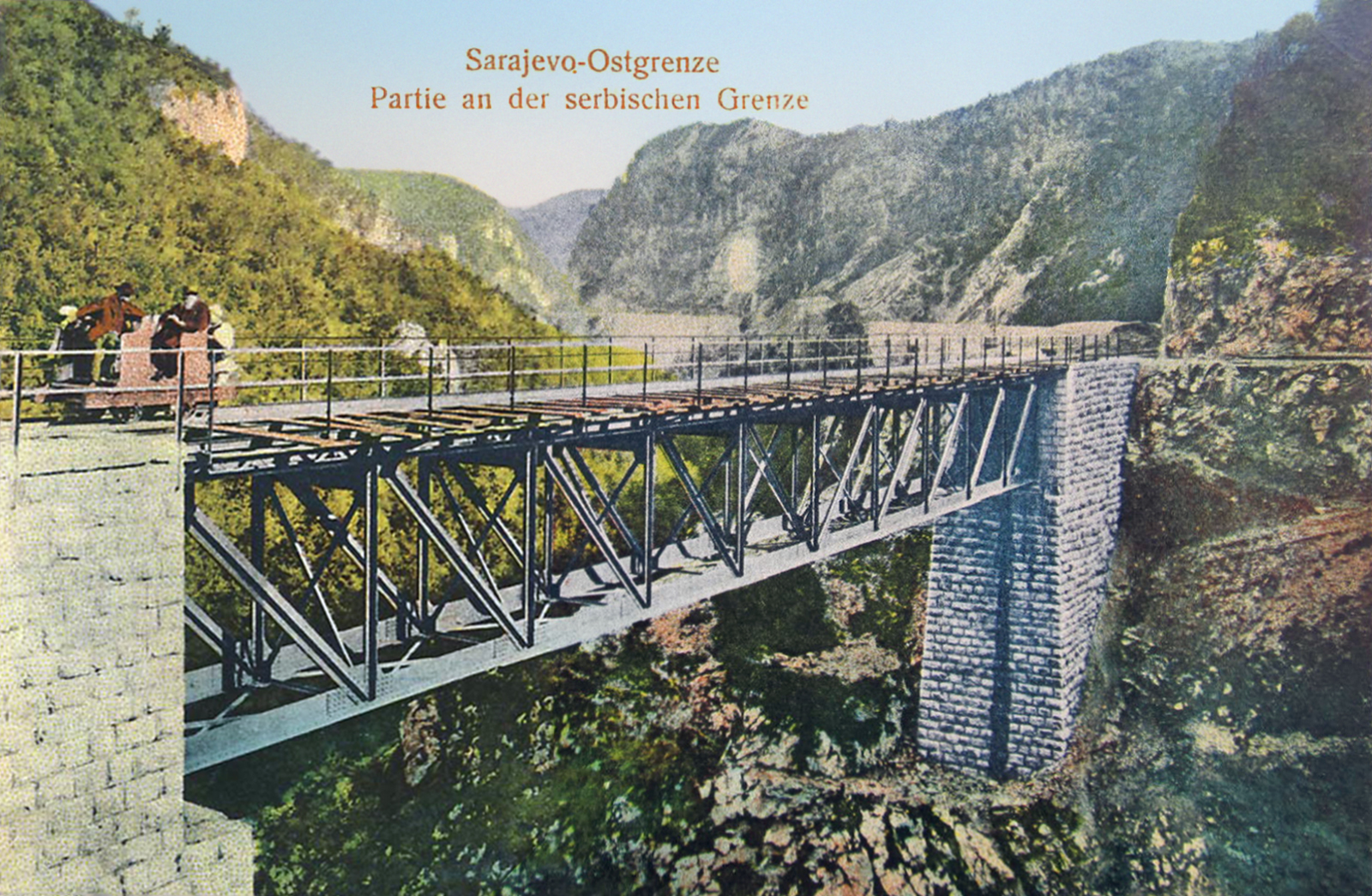
Bridge built during the Austro-Hungarian rule

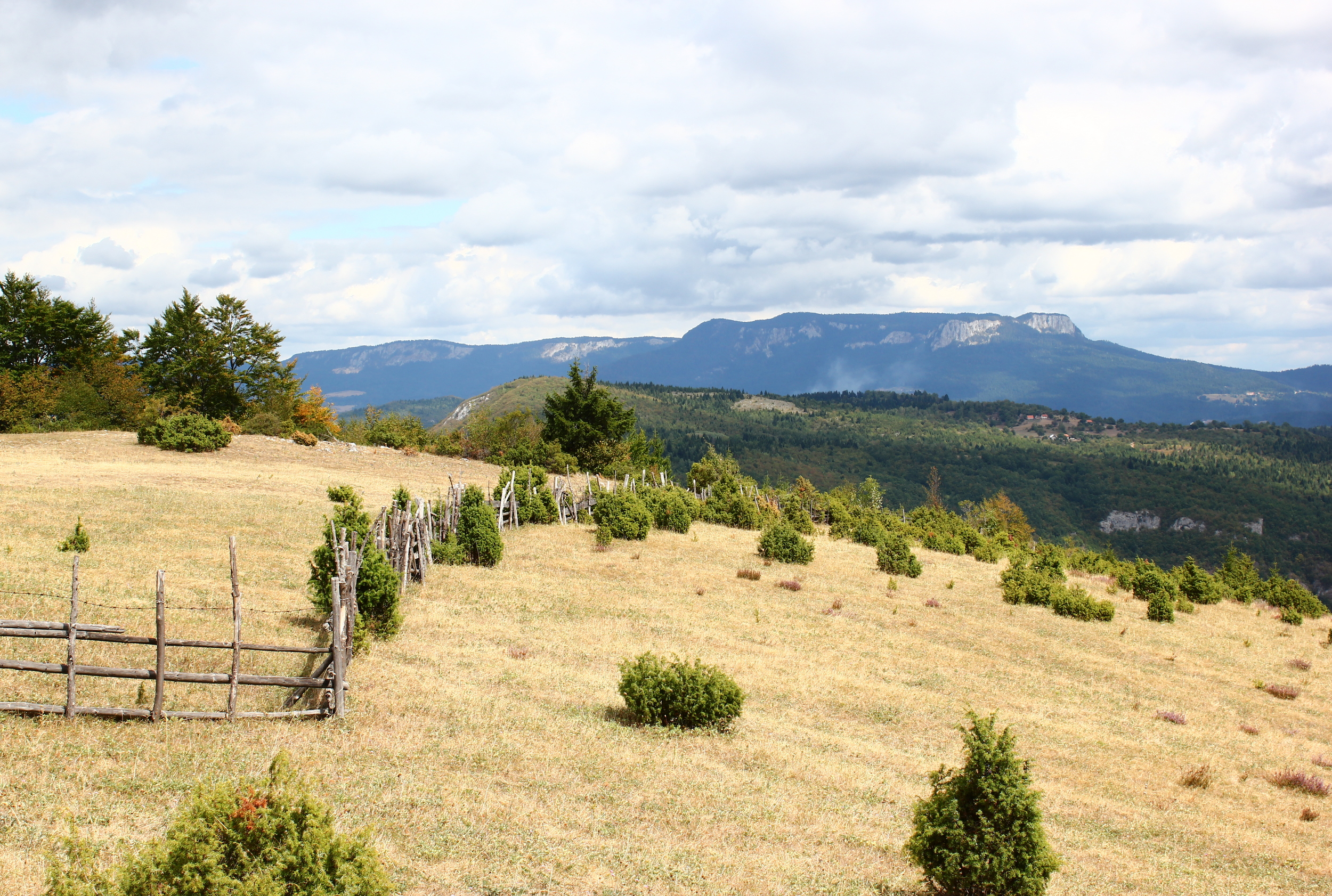
Romanija

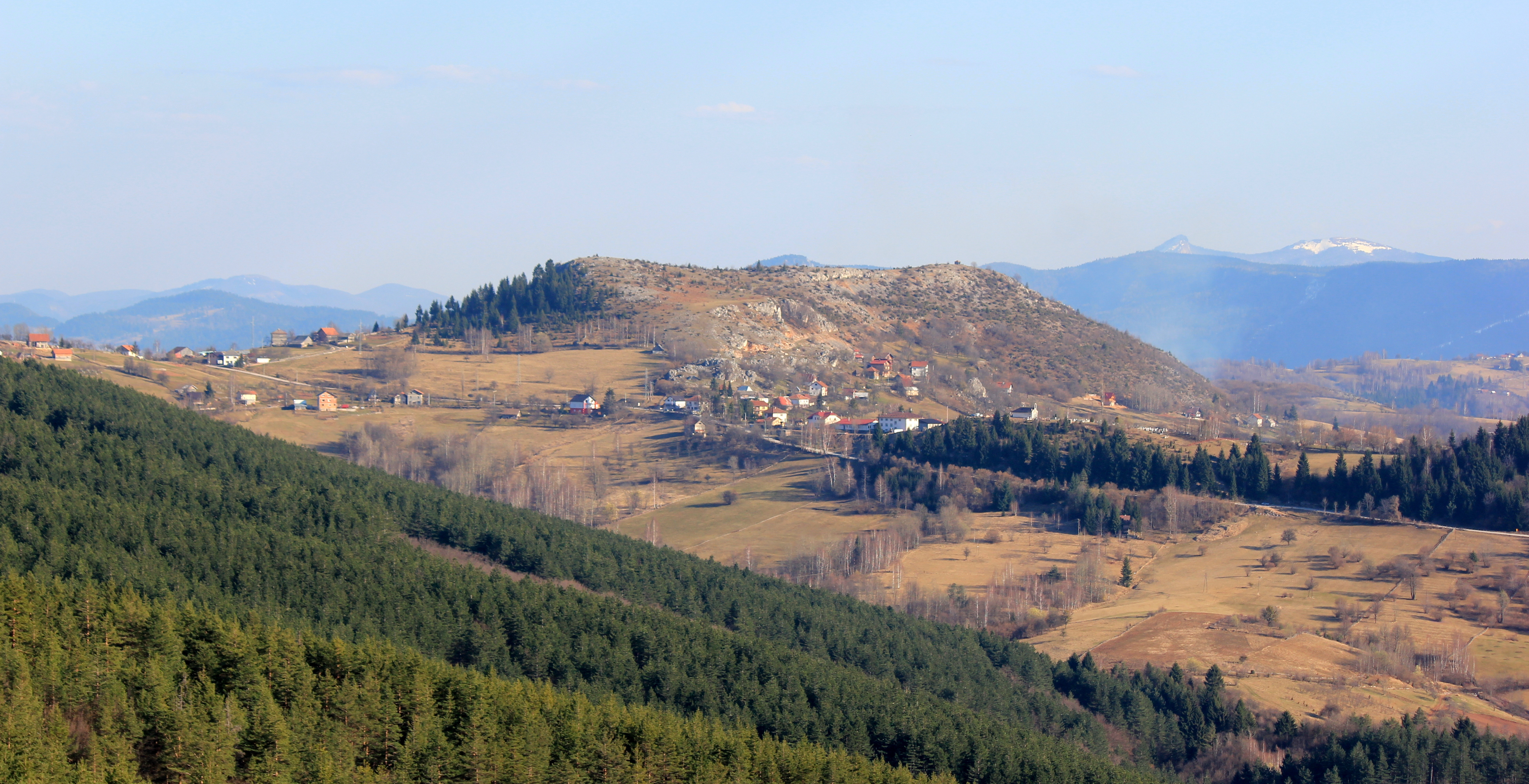
Hreša

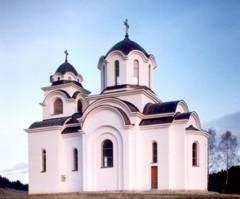
Serbian Orthodox church
