= Ozrakovići =

- Urban area
- Ozrakovići
- View of Ozrakovići

- Location within Bosnia and Herzegovina
- Coordinates: 43.9984994°N 18.1555973°E
- Country: Bosnia and Herzegovina
- Entity: Federation of Bosnia and Herzegovina
- Canton: Zenica-Doboj
- Municipality: Visoko

Area
  - Total: 0.40 sq mi (1.04 km^{2})

Population (2013)
  - Total: 301
  - Density: 750/sq mi (289/km^{2})
- Time zone: UTC+1 (CET)
  - Summer (DST): UTC+2 (CEST)

Ozrakovići is an urban settlement in the municipality of Visoko, Bosnia and Herzegovina, encompassing Ozrakovići Street, Kakanjska Street, Podvanj, and the Ozrakovići Business Zone.

== Demographics ==
According to the 2013 census, its population was 301.

Ethnicity in 2013
Ethnicity	Number	Percentage
Bosniaks	274	91.0%
Croats	5	1.7%
Serbs	5	1.7%
other/undeclared	17	5.6%
Total	301	100%
