= Donja Zimća =

- Village
- Location within Bosnia and Herzegovina
- Coordinates: 44.0149932°N 18.132058°E
- Country: Bosnia and Herzegovina
- Entity: Federation of Bosnia and Herzegovina
- Canton: Zenica-Doboj
- Municipality: Visoko

Area
  - Total: 0.77 sq mi (1.99 km^{2})

Population (2013)
  - Total: 600
  - Density: 780/sq mi (300/km^{2})
- Time zone: UTC+1 (CET)
  - Summer (DST): UTC+2 (CEST)

Donja Zimća is a village in the municipality of Visoko, Bosnia and Herzegovina.

== Demographics ==
According to the 2013 census, its population was 600.

Ethnicity in 2013
Ethnicity	Number	Percentage
Bosniaks	454	75.7%
Croats	94	15.7%
Serbs	6	1.0%
other/undeclared	46	7.7%
Total	600	100%
