= Dolipolje =

- Village
- Location within Bosnia and Herzegovina
- Coordinates: 43.9856281°N 18.1998785°E
- Country: Bosnia and Herzegovina
- Entity: Federation of Bosnia and Herzegovina
- Canton: Zenica-Doboj
- Municipality: Visoko

Area
  - Total: 0.70 sq mi (1.82 km^{2})

Population (2013)
  - Total: 229
  - Density: 326/sq mi (126/km^{2})
- Time zone: UTC+1 (CET)
  - Summer (DST): UTC+2 (CEST)

Dolipolje is a village in the municipality of Visoko, Bosnia and Herzegovina.

== Demographics ==
According to the 2013 census, its population was 229.

Ethnicity in 2013
Ethnicity	Number	Percentage
Bosniaks	226	98.7%
Croats	1	0.4%
other/undeclared	2	0.9%
Total	229	100%
