= Kalići =

- Village
- Location within Bosnia and Herzegovina
- Coordinates: 44.0408813°N 18.0615461°E
- Country: Bosnia and Herzegovina
- Entity: Federation of Bosnia and Herzegovina
- Canton: Zenica-Doboj
- Municipality: Visoko

Area
  - Total: 1.98 sq mi (5.12 km^{2})

Population (2013)
  - Total: 413
  - Density: 209/sq mi (80.7/km^{2})
- Time zone: UTC+1 (CET)
  - Summer (DST): UTC+2 (CEST)

Kalići is a village in the municipality of Visoko, Bosnia and Herzegovina.

== Demographics ==
According to the 2013 census, its population was 413.

Ethnicity in 2013
Ethnicity	Number	Percentage
Bosniaks	412	99.8%
other/undeclared	1	0.2%
Total	413	100%
