= Srhinje =

- Village
- Location within Bosnia and Herzegovina
- Coordinates: 43.9891804°N 18.138168°E
- Country: Bosnia and Herzegovina
- Entity: Federation of Bosnia and Herzegovina
- Canton: Zenica-Doboj
- Municipality: Visoko

Area
  - Total: 2.97 sq mi (7.68 km^{2})

Population (2013)
  - Total: 1,367
  - Density: 461/sq mi (178/km^{2})
- Time zone: UTC+1 (CET)
  - Summer (DST): UTC+2 (CEST)

Srhinje is a village in the municipality of Visoko, Bosnia and Herzegovina.

== Demographics ==
According to the 2013 census, its population was 1,367.

Ethnicity in 2013
Ethnicity	Number	Percentage
Bosniaks	1,303	95.3%
Croats	7	0.5%
Serbs	6	0.4%
other/undeclared	51	3.7%
Total	1,367	100%
