= Mulići =

- Village
- Location within Bosnia and Herzegovina
- Coordinates: 44.0122851°N 18.1556582°E
- Country: Bosnia and Herzegovina
- Entity: Federation of Bosnia and Herzegovina
- Canton: Zenica-Doboj
- Municipality: Visoko

Area
  - Total: 0.70 sq mi (1.82 km^{2})

Population (2013)
  - Total: 520
  - Density: 740/sq mi (290/km^{2})
- Time zone: UTC+1 (CET)
  - Summer (DST): UTC+2 (CEST)

Mulići is a village in the municipality of Visoko, Bosnia and Herzegovina.

== Demographics ==
According to the 2013 census, its population was 520.

Ethnicity in 2013
Ethnicity	Number	Percentage
Bosniaks	513	98.7%
other/undeclared	7	1.3%
Total	520	100%
