= Seoča =

- Village
- Location within Bosnia and Herzegovina
- Coordinates: 44.058347°N 18.08105°E
- Country: Bosnia and Herzegovina
- Entity: Federation of Bosnia and Herzegovina
- Canton: Zenica-Doboj
- Municipality: Visoko

Area
  - Total: 2.71 sq mi (7.02 km^{2})

Population (2013)
  - Total: 604
  - Density: 223/sq mi (86.0/km^{2})
- Time zone: UTC+1 (CET)
  - Summer (DST): UTC+2 (CEST)

Seoča is a village in the municipality of Visoko, Bosnia and Herzegovina.

== Demographics ==
According to the 2013 census, its population was 604.

Ethnicity in 2013
Ethnicity	Number	Percentage
Bosniaks	581	96.2%
Croats	9	1.5%
other/undeclared	14	2.3%
Total	604	100%
