= Čakalovići =

- Village
- Location within Bosnia and Herzegovina
- Coordinates: 44.0009494°N 18.0812127°E
- Country: Bosnia and Herzegovina
- Entity: Federation of Bosnia and Herzegovina
- Canton: Zenica-Doboj
- Municipality: Visoko

Area
  - Total: 0.36 sq mi (0.93 km^{2})

Population (2013)
  - Total: 69
  - Density: 190/sq mi (74/km^{2})
- Time zone: UTC+1 (CET)
  - Summer (DST): UTC+2 (CEST)

Čakalovići is a village in the municipality of Visoko, Bosnia and Herzegovina.

== Demographics ==
According to the 2013 census, its population was 69.

Ethnicity in 2013
Ethnicity	Number	Percentage
Bosniaks	60	87.0%
Croats	1	1.4%
other/undeclared	8	11.6%
Total	69	100%
