= Bradve =

- Village
- Location within Bosnia and Herzegovina
- Coordinates: 44.0252965°N 18.1105642°E
- Country: Bosnia and Herzegovina
- Entity: Federation of Bosnia and Herzegovina
- Canton: Zenica-Doboj
- Municipality: Visoko

Area
  - Total: 0.55 sq mi (1.42 km^{2})

Population (2013)
  - Total: 1,003
  - Density: 1,830/sq mi (706/km^{2})
- Time zone: UTC+1 (CET)
  - Summer (DST): UTC+2 (CEST)

Bradve is a village in the municipality of Visoko, Bosnia and Herzegovina.

== Demographics ==
According to the 2013 census, its population was 1,003.

Ethnicity in 2013
Ethnicity	Number	Percentage
Bosniaks	950	94.7%
Croats	2	0.2%
other/undeclared	51	5.1%
Total	1,003	100%
