= Muhašinovići =

- Village
- Location within Bosnia and Herzegovina
- Coordinates: 44.0075133°N 18.1323021°E
- Country: Bosnia and Herzegovina
- Entity: Federation of Bosnia and Herzegovina
- Canton: Zenica-Doboj
- Municipality: Visoko

Area
  - Total: 0.57 sq mi (1.47 km^{2})

Population (2013)
  - Total: 343
  - Density: 604/sq mi (233/km^{2})
- Time zone: UTC+1 (CET)
  - Summer (DST): UTC+2 (CEST)

Muhašinovići is a village in the municipality of Visoko, Bosnia and Herzegovina.

== Demographics ==
According to the 2013 census, its population was 343.

Ethnicity in 2013
Ethnicity	Number	Percentage
Bosniaks	242	70.6%
Croats	28	8.2%
Serbs	5	1.5%
other/undeclared	68	19.8%
Total	343	100%
