= Kula Banjer =

- Village
- Location within Bosnia and Herzegovina
- Coordinates: 43.9973275°N 18.1906928°E
- Country: Bosnia and Herzegovina
- Entity: Federation of Bosnia and Herzegovina
- Canton: Zenica-Doboj
- Municipality: Visoko

Area
  - Total: 0.76 sq mi (1.96 km^{2})

Population (2013)
  - Total: 479
  - Density: 633/sq mi (244/km^{2})
- Time zone: UTC+1 (CET)
  - Summer (DST): UTC+2 (CEST)

Kula Banjer is a village in the municipality of Visoko, Bosnia and Herzegovina.

== Demographics ==
According to the 2013 census, its population was 479.

Ethnicity in 2013
Ethnicity	Number	Percentage
Bosniaks	440	91.9%
Serbs	18	3.8%
Croats	8	1.7%
other/undeclared	13	2.7%
Total	479	100%
