= Tušnjići =

- Village
- Location within Bosnia and Herzegovina
- Coordinates: 43.9591939°N 18.1106278°E
- Country: Bosnia and Herzegovina
- Entity: Federation of Bosnia and Herzegovina
- Canton: Zenica-Doboj
- Municipality: Visoko

Area
  - Total: 2.35 sq mi (6.09 km^{2})

Population (2013)
  - Total: 353
  - Density: 150/sq mi (58.0/km^{2})
- Time zone: UTC+1 (CET)
  - Summer (DST): UTC+2 (CEST)

Tušnjići is a village in the municipality of Visoko, Bosnia and Herzegovina.

== Demographics ==
According to the 2013 census, its population was 353.

Ethnicity in 2013
Ethnicity	Number	Percentage
Bosniaks	298	84.4%
Croats	33	9.3%
Serbs	12	3.4%
other/undeclared	10	2.8%
Total	353	100%
