= Lisovo, Visoko =

Lisovo
- Village
- Location within Bosnia and Herzegovina
- Coordinates: 44°01′14″N 18°04′03″E
- Country: Bosnia and Herzegovina
- Entity: Federation of Bosnia and Herzegovina
- Canton: Zenica-Doboj
- Municipality: Visoko

Area
  - Total: 1.21 sq mi (3.13 km^{2})

Population (2013)
  - Total: 199
  - Density: 165/sq mi (63.6/km^{2})
- Time zone: UTC+01:00 (CET)
  - Summer (DST): UTC+02:00 (CEST)

Lisovo is a village in the municipality of Visoko, Bosnia and Herzegovina.

== Demographics ==
According to the 2013 census, its population was 199.

Ethnicity in 2013
Ethnicity	Number	Percentage
Bosniaks	180	90.5%
Croats	6	3.0%
other/undeclared	13	6.5%
Total	199	100%
