= Kalotići =

- Village
- Location within Bosnia and Herzegovina
- Coordinates: 43.9992936°N 18.1776694°E
- Country: Bosnia and Herzegovina
- Entity: Federation of Bosnia and Herzegovina
- Canton: Zenica-Doboj
- Municipality: Visoko

Area
  - Total: 0.035 sq mi (0.09 km^{2})

Population (2013)
  - Total: 33
  - Density: 950/sq mi (370/km^{2})
- Time zone: UTC+1 (CET)
  - Summer (DST): UTC+2 (CEST)

Kalotići is a village in the municipality of Visoko, Bosnia and Herzegovina. Visoko Train Station acting as the nearest train station.

== Demographics ==
According to the 2013 census, its population was 33.

Ethnicity in 2013
| Ethnicity | Number | Percentage |
|---|---|---|
| Bosniaks | 26 | 78.8% |
| Serbs | 7 | 21.2% |
| Total | 33 | 100% |
