= Zagorice =

- Village
- Location within Bosnia and Herzegovina
- Coordinates: 43.9509031°N 18.1307644°E
- Country: Bosnia and Herzegovina
- Entity: Federation of Bosnia and Herzegovina
- Canton: Zenica-Doboj
- Municipality: Visoko

Area
  - Total: 1.20 sq mi (3.11 km^{2})

Population (2013)
  - Total: 59
  - Density: 49/sq mi (19/km^{2})
- Time zone: UTC+1 (CET)
  - Summer (DST): UTC+2 (CEST)

Zagorice is a village in the municipality of Visoko, Bosnia and Herzegovina.

== Demographics ==
According to the 2013 census, its population was 59, all Croats.
