= Vilenjak =

- Village
- Location within Bosnia and Herzegovina
- Coordinates: 44.0322966°N 18.104041°E
- Country: Bosnia and Herzegovina
- Entity: Federation of Bosnia and Herzegovina
- Canton: Zenica-Doboj
- Municipality: Visoko

Area
  - Total: 0.22 sq mi (0.58 km^{2})

Population (2013)
  - Total: 157
  - Density: 700/sq mi (270/km^{2})
- Time zone: UTC+1 (CET)
  - Summer (DST): UTC+2 (CEST)

Vilenjak is a village in the municipality of Visoko, Bosnia and Herzegovina.

== Demographics ==
According to the 2013 census, its population was 157.

Ethnicity in 2013
Ethnicity	Number	Percentage
Bosniaks	149	94.9%
Serbs	5	3.2%
Croats	1	0.6%
other/undeclared	2	1.3%
Total	157	100%
