= Čekrčići =

- Village
- Location within Bosnia and Herzegovina
- Coordinates: 43.9905393°N 18.2016411°E
- Country: Bosnia and Herzegovina
- Entity: Federation of Bosnia and Herzegovina
- Canton: Zenica-Doboj
- Municipality: Visoko

Area
  - Total: 0.46 sq mi (1.20 km^{2})

Population (2013)
  - Total: 130
  - Density: 280/sq mi (110/km^{2})
- Time zone: UTC+1 (CET)
  - Summer (DST): UTC+2 (CEST)

Čekrčići is a village in the municipality of Visoko, Bosnia and Herzegovina. It is located on the southern banks of the River Bosna.

== Demographics ==
According to the 2013 census, its population was 130.

Ethnicity in 2013
Ethnicity	Number	Percentage
Bosniaks	122	93.8%
Serbs	6	4.6%
other/undeclared	2	1.5%
Total	130	100%
