= Gornja Zimća =

- Village
- Location within Bosnia and Herzegovina
- Coordinates: 44.0007384°N 18.1190937°E
- Country: Bosnia and Herzegovina
- Entity: Federation of Bosnia and Herzegovina
- Canton: Zenica-Doboj
- Municipality: Visoko

Area
  - Total: 2.09 sq mi (5.41 km^{2})

Population (2013)
  - Total: 273
  - Density: 131/sq mi (50.5/km^{2})
- Time zone: UTC+1 (CET)
  - Summer (DST): UTC+2 (CEST)

Gornja Zimča is a village in the municipality of Visoko, Bosnia and Herzegovina.

== Demographics ==
According to the 2013 census, its population was 273.

Ethnicity in 2013
Ethnicity	Number	Percentage
Bosniaks	271	99.3%
other/undeclared	2	0.7%
Total	273	100%
