= Buzići =

- Village
- Location within Bosnia and Herzegovina
- Coordinates: 44.0395349°N 18.1272375°E
- Country: Bosnia and Herzegovina
- Entity: Federation of Bosnia and Herzegovina
- Canton: Zenica-Doboj
- Municipality: Visoko

Area
  - Total: 0.48 sq mi (1.25 km^{2})

Population (2013)
  - Total: 339
  - Density: 702/sq mi (271/km^{2})
- Time zone: UTC+1 (CET)
  - Summer (DST): UTC+2 (CEST)

Buzići is a village in the municipality of Visoko, Bosnia and Herzegovina. It is located on the eastern banks of the River Bosna.

== Demographics ==
According to the 2013 census, its population was 339.

Ethnicity in 2013
Ethnicity	Number	Percentage
Bosniaks	338	99.7%
other/undeclared	1	0.3%
Total	339	100%
