= Taukčići =

- Village
- Location within Bosnia and Herzegovina
- Coordinates: 44.0055978°N 18.1754071°E
- Country: Bosnia and Herzegovina
- Entity: Federation of Bosnia and Herzegovina
- Canton: Zenica-Doboj
- Municipality: Visoko

Area
  - Total: 0.44 sq mi (1.14 km^{2})

Population (2013)
  - Total: 296
  - Density: 672/sq mi (260/km^{2})
- Time zone: UTC+1 (CET)
  - Summer (DST): UTC+2 (CEST)

Taukčići is a village in the municipality of Visoko, Bosnia and Herzegovina.

== Demographics ==
According to the 2013 census, its population was 296.

Ethnicity in 2013
Ethnicity	Number	Percentage
Bosniaks	289	97.6%
other/undeclared	7	2.4%
Total	296	100%
