= Ayas Pasha =

Ayas Pasha may refer to:

- Ayas Pasha of Bosnia (died 1486), Ottoman governor of Bosnia
- Ayas Mehmed Pasha (1483–1539), Ottoman grand vizier
