= Tujlići =

- Village
- Location within Bosnia and Herzegovina
- Coordinates: 44.0467334°N 18.0588451°E
- Country: Bosnia and Herzegovina
- Entity: Federation of Bosnia and Herzegovina
- Canton: Zenica-Doboj
- Municipality: Visoko

Area
  - Total: 0.64 sq mi (1.67 km^{2})

Population (2013)
  - Total: 209
  - Density: 324/sq mi (125/km^{2})
- Time zone: UTC+1 (CET)
  - Summer (DST): UTC+2 (CEST)

Tujlići is a village in the municipality of Visoko, Bosnia and Herzegovina.

== Demographics ==
According to the 2013 census, its population was 209.

Ethnicity in 2013
| Ethnicity | Number | Percentage |
|---|---|---|
| Bosniaks | 202 | 96.7% |
| other/undeclared | 7 | 3.3% |
| Total | 209 | 100% |
