= Mali Trnovci =

- Village
- Location within Bosnia and Herzegovina
- Coordinates: 44.0579323°N 18.1668074°E
- Country: Bosnia and Herzegovina
- Entity: Federation of Bosnia and Herzegovina
- Canton: Zenica-Doboj
- Municipality: Visoko

Area
  - Total: 0.73 sq mi (1.90 km^{2})

Population (2013)
  - Total: 238
  - Density: 324/sq mi (125/km^{2})
- Time zone: UTC+1 (CET)
  - Summer (DST): UTC+2 (CEST)

Mali Trnovci is a village in the municipality of Visoko, Bosnia and Herzegovina.

== Demographics ==
According to the 2013 census, its population was 238.

Ethnicity in 2013
Ethnicity	Number	Percentage
Bosniaks	233	97.9%
other/undeclared	5	2.1%
Total	238	100%
