= Zbilje, Visoko =

Zbilje
- Village
- Location within Bosnia and Herzegovina
- Coordinates: 43.9696844°N 18.1811411°E
- Country: Bosnia and Herzegovina
- Entity: Federation of Bosnia and Herzegovina
- Canton: Zenica-Doboj
- Municipality: Visoko

Area
  - Total: 1.20 sq mi (3.12 km^{2})

Population (2013)
  - Total: 445
  - Density: 369/sq mi (143/km^{2})
- Time zone: UTC+1 (CET)
  - Summer (DST): UTC+2 (CEST)

Zbilje is a village in the municipality of Visoko, Bosnia and Herzegovina.

== Demographics ==
According to the 2013 census, its population was 445.

Ethnicity in 2013
Ethnicity	Number	Percentage
Bosniaks	424	95.3%
Serbs	6	1.3%
other/undeclared	15	3.4%
Total	445	100%
