= Zagornica =

- Village
- Location within Bosnia and Herzegovina
- Coordinates: 44.0270338°N 18.1476799°E
- Country: Bosnia and Herzegovina
- Entity: Federation of Bosnia and Herzegovina
- Canton: Zenica-Doboj
- Municipality: Visoko

Area
  - Total: 0.25 sq mi (0.65 km^{2})

Population (2013)
  - Total: 387
  - Density: 1,500/sq mi (600/km^{2})
- Time zone: UTC+1 (CET)
  - Summer (DST): UTC+2 (CEST)

Zagornica is a village in the municipality of Visoko, Bosnia and Herzegovina.

== Demographics ==
According to the 2013 census, its population was 387.

Ethnicity in 2013
Ethnicity	Number	Percentage
Bosniaks	378	97.7%
Croats	3	0.8%
other/undeclared	6	1.6%
Total	387	100%
