= Šošnje =

- Village
- Location within Bosnia and Herzegovina
- Coordinates: 44.0780627°N 18.2372846°E
- Country: Bosnia and Herzegovina
- Entity: Federation of Bosnia and Herzegovina
- Canton: Zenica-Doboj
- Municipality: Visoko

Area
  - Total: 1.43 sq mi (3.71 km^{2})

Population (2013)
  - Total: 142
  - Density: 99.1/sq mi (38.3/km^{2})
- Time zone: UTC+1 (CET)
  - Summer (DST): UTC+2 (CEST)

Šošnje is a village in the municipality of Visoko, Bosnia and Herzegovina.

== Demographics ==
According to the 2013 census, its population was 142.

Ethnicity in 2013
| Ethnicity | Number | Percentage |
|---|---|---|
| Bosniaks | 141 | 99.3% |
| other/undeclared | 1 | 0.7% |
| Total | 142 | 100% |
