= Ratkovci, Bosnia and Herzegovina =

Ratkovci
- Village
- Location within Bosnia and Herzegovina
- Coordinates: 43.9256082°N 18.2154347°E
- Country: Bosnia and Herzegovina
- Entity: Federation of Bosnia and Herzegovina
- Canton: Zenica-Doboj
- Municipality: Visoko

Area
  - Total: 1.32 sq mi (3.43 km^{2})

Population (2013)
  - Total: 42
  - Density: 32/sq mi (12/km^{2})
- Time zone: UTC+1 (CET)
  - Summer (DST): UTC+2 (CEST)

Ratkovci is a village in the municipality of Visoko, Bosnia and Herzegovina.

== Demographics ==
According to the 2013 census, its population was 42, all Bosniaks.
