= Loznik, Visoko =

Loznik
- Village
- Location within Bosnia and Herzegovina
- Coordinates: 44.0217858°N 18.1938807°E
- Country: Bosnia and Herzegovina
- Entity: Federation of Bosnia and Herzegovina
- Canton: Zenica-Doboj
- Municipality: Visoko

Area
  - Total: 0.80 sq mi (2.07 km^{2})

Population (2013)
  - Total: 463
  - Density: 579/sq mi (224/km^{2})
- Time zone: UTC+1 (CET)
  - Summer (DST): UTC+2 (CEST)

Loznik is a village in the municipality of Visoko, Bosnia and Herzegovina.

== Demographics ==
According to the 2013 census, its population was 463.

Ethnicity in 2013
Ethnicity	Number	Percentage
Bosniaks	451	97.4%
other/undeclared	12	2.6%
Total	463	100%
