= Uvorići =

- Village
- Location within Bosnia and Herzegovina
- Coordinates: 44.0152469°N 18.1752125°E
- Country: Bosnia and Herzegovina
- Entity: Federation of Bosnia and Herzegovina
- Canton: Zenica-Doboj
- Municipality: Visoko

Area
  - Total: 1.33 sq mi (3.45 km^{2})

Population (2013)
  - Total: 929
  - Density: 697/sq mi (269/km^{2})
- Time zone: UTC+1 (CET)
  - Summer (DST): UTC+2 (CEST)

Uvorići is a village in the municipality of Visoko, Bosnia and Herzegovina.

== Demographics ==
According to the 2013 census, its population was 929.

Ethnicity in 2013
Ethnicity	Number	Percentage
Bosniaks	922	99.2%
other/undeclared	7	0.8%
Total	929	100%
