= Svinjarevo, Visoko =

Svinjarevo
- Village
- Location within Bosnia and Herzegovina
- Coordinates: 43.9940983°N 18.1787877°E
- Country: Bosnia and Herzegovina
- Entity: Federation of Bosnia and Herzegovina
- Canton: Zenica-Doboj
- Municipality: Visoko

Area
  - Total: 1.57 sq mi (4.06 km^{2})

Population (2013)
  - Total: 21
  - Density: 13/sq mi (5.2/km^{2})
- Time zone: UTC+1 (CET)
  - Summer (DST): UTC+2 (CEST)

Svinjarevo is a village in the municipality of Visoko, Bosnia and Herzegovina.

== Demographics ==
According to the 2013 census, its population was 21, all Bosniaks.
