= Stuparići =

- Village
- Location within Bosnia and Herzegovina
- Coordinates: 43.9589198°N 18.186253°E
- Country: Bosnia and Herzegovina
- Entity: Federation of Bosnia and Herzegovina
- Canton: Zenica-Doboj
- Municipality: Visoko

Area
  - Total: 1.21 sq mi (3.13 km^{2})

Population (2013)
  - Total: 533
  - Density: 441/sq mi (170/km^{2})
- Time zone: UTC+1 (CET)
  - Summer (DST): UTC+2 (CEST)

Stuparići is a village in the municipality of Visoko, Bosnia and Herzegovina.

== Demographics ==
According to the 2013 census, its population was 533.

Ethnicity in 2013
Ethnicity	Number	Percentage
Bosniaks	524	98.3%
other/undeclared	9	1.7%
Total	533	100%
