= Paljike =

- Village
- Location within Bosnia and Herzegovina
- Coordinates: 44.0194492°N 18.098254°E
- Country: Bosnia and Herzegovina
- Entity: Federation of Bosnia and Herzegovina
- Canton: Zenica-Doboj
- Municipality: Visoko

Area
  - Total: 0.78 sq mi (2.03 km^{2})

Population (2013)
  - Total: 142
  - Density: 181/sq mi (70.0/km^{2})
- Time zone: UTC+1 (CET)
  - Summer (DST): UTC+2 (CEST)

Paljike is a village in the municipality of Visoko, Bosnia and Herzegovina.

== Demographics ==
According to the 2013 census, its population was 142.

Ethnicity in 2013
Ethnicity	Number	Percentage
Bosniaks	134	94.4%
other/undeclared	8	5.6%
Total	142	100%
