= Hlapčevići =

- Village
- Location within Bosnia and Herzegovina
- Coordinates: 44.0298063°N 18.1100867°E
- Country: Bosnia and Herzegovina
- Entity: Federation of Bosnia and Herzegovina
- Canton: Zenica-Doboj
- Municipality: Visoko

Area
  - Total: 0.42 sq mi (1.08 km^{2})

Population (2013)
  - Total: 748
  - Density: 1,790/sq mi (693/km^{2})
- Time zone: UTC+1 (CET)
  - Summer (DST): UTC+2 (CEST)

Hlapčevići is a village in the municipality of Visoko, Bosnia and Herzegovina.

== Demographics ==
According to the 2013 census, its population was 748.

Ethnicity in 2013
Ethnicity	Number	Percentage
Bosniaks	736	98.4%
Croats	1	0.1%
Serbs	1	0.1%
other/undeclared	10	1.3%
Total	748	100%
