= Orašac, Visoko =

Orašac
- Village
- Location within Bosnia and Herzegovina
- Coordinates: 44.0058054°N 18.0866945°E
- Country: Bosnia and Herzegovina
- Entity: Federation of Bosnia and Herzegovina
- Canton: Zenica-Doboj
- Municipality: Visoko

Area
  - Total: 0.89 sq mi (2.30 km^{2})

Population (2013)
  - Total: 744
  - Density: 838/sq mi (323/km^{2})
- Time zone: UTC+1 (CET)
  - Summer (DST): UTC+2 (CEST)

Orašac is a village in the municipality of Visoko, in the country of Bosnia and Herzegovina.

== Demographics ==
According to the 2013 census, its population was 744. This is an increase from the population of the village in the 1991 census.

Ethnicity in 2013
Ethnicity	Number	Percentage
Bosniaks	734	98.7%
Serbs	1	0.1%
other/undeclared	9	1.2%
Total	744	100%
