= Grajani =

- Village
- Location within Bosnia and Herzegovina
- Coordinates: 43.9468907°N 18.1543712°E
- Country: Bosnia and Herzegovina
- Entity: Federation of Bosnia and Herzegovina
- Canton: Zenica-Doboj
- Municipality: Visoko

Area
  - Total: 1.35 sq mi (3.50 km^{2})

Population (2013)
  - Total: 406
  - Density: 300/sq mi (116/km^{2})
- Time zone: UTC+1 (CET)
  - Summer (DST): UTC+2 (CEST)

Grajani is a village in the municipality of Visoko, Bosnia and Herzegovina.

== Demographics ==
According to the 2013 census, its population was 406.

Ethnicity in 2013
Ethnicity	Number	Percentage
Bosniaks	385	94.8%
other/undeclared	21	5.2%
Total	406	100%
