= Ramadanovci =

- Village
- Location within Bosnia and Herzegovina
- Coordinates: 43.945402°N 18.1800547°E
- Country: Bosnia and Herzegovina
- Entity: Federation of Bosnia and Herzegovina
- Canton: Zenica-Doboj
- Municipality: Visoko

Area
  - Total: 0.55 sq mi (1.42 km^{2})

Population (2013)
  - Total: 247
  - Density: 451/sq mi (174/km^{2})
- Time zone: UTC+1 (CET)
  - Summer (DST): UTC+2 (CEST)

Ramadanovci is a village in the municipality of Visoko, Bosnia and Herzegovina.

== Demographics ==
According to the 2013 census, its population was 247.

Ethnicity in 2013
Ethnicity	Number	Percentage
Bosniaks	192	77.7%
Serbs	1	0.4%
other/undeclared	54	21.9%
Total	247	100%
