= Bulčići =

- Village
- Location within Bosnia and Herzegovina
- Coordinates: 44.0832653°N 18.2010704°E
- Country: Bosnia and Herzegovina
- Entity: Federation of Bosnia and Herzegovina
- Canton: Zenica-Doboj
- Municipality: Visoko

Area
  - Total: 0.66 sq mi (1.70 km^{2})

Population (2013)
  - Total: 15
  - Density: 23/sq mi (8.8/km^{2})
- Time zone: UTC+1 (CET)
  - Summer (DST): UTC+2 (CEST)

Bulčići is a village in the municipality of Visoko, Bosnia and Herzegovina.

== Demographics ==
According to the 2013 census, its population was 15, all Bosniaks.
