= Upovac =

- Village
- Location within Bosnia and Herzegovina
- Coordinates: 44.0486153°N 18.1356818°E
- Country: Bosnia and Herzegovina
- Entity: Federation of Bosnia and Herzegovina
- Canton: Zenica-Doboj
- Municipality: Visoko

Area
  - Total: 1.33 sq mi (3.44 km^{2})

Population (2013)
  - Total: 520
  - Density: 390/sq mi (150/km^{2})
- Time zone: UTC+1 (CET)
  - Summer (DST): UTC+2 (CEST)

Upovac is a village in the municipality of Visoko, Bosnia and Herzegovina.

== Demographics ==
According to the 2013 census, its population was 520.

Ethnicity in 2013
Ethnicity	Number	Percentage
Bosniaks	510	98.1%
other/undeclared	10	1.9%
Total	520	100%
