= Gornje Moštre =

- Village
- Location within Bosnia and Herzegovina
- Coordinates: 44.0191711°N 18.1448154°E
- Country: Bosnia and Herzegovina
- Entity: Federation of Bosnia and Herzegovina
- Canton: Zenica-Doboj
- Municipality: Visoko

Area
  - Total: 0.59 sq mi (1.54 km^{2})

Population (2013)
  - Total: 731
  - Density: 1,230/sq mi (475/km^{2})
- Time zone: UTC+1 (CET)
  - Summer (DST): UTC+2 (CEST)

Gornje Moštre is a village in the municipality of Visoko, Bosnia and Herzegovina. It is located on the western banks of the River Bosna.

== Demographics ==
According to the 2013 census, its population was 731.

Ethnicity in 2013
Ethnicity	Number	Percentage
Bosniaks	686	93.8%
Croats	21	2.9%
Serbs	3	0.4%
other/undeclared	21	2.9%
Total	731	100%
