= Donja Vratnica =

- Village
- Location within Bosnia and Herzegovina
- Coordinates: 44.0009469°N 18.2189726°E
- Country: Bosnia and Herzegovina
- Entity: Federation of Bosnia and Herzegovina
- Canton: Zenica-Doboj
- Municipality: Visoko

Area
  - Total: 0.89 sq mi (2.31 km^{2})

Population (2013)
  - Total: 262
  - Density: 294/sq mi (113/km^{2})
- Time zone: UTC+1 (CET)
  - Summer (DST): UTC+2 (CEST)

Donja Vratnica is a village in the municipality of Visoko, Bosnia and Herzegovina.

== Demographics ==
According to the 2013 census, its population was 262.

Ethnicity in 2013
Ethnicity	Number	Percentage
Bosniaks	255	97.3%
other/undeclared	7	2.7%
Total	262	100%
