= Podvinjci =

- Village
- Location within Bosnia and Herzegovina
- Coordinates: 44.0595005°N 18.229376°E
- Country: Bosnia and Herzegovina
- Entity: Federation of Bosnia and Herzegovina
- Canton: Zenica-Doboj
- Municipality: Visoko

Area
  - Total: 3.14 sq mi (8.13 km^{2})

Population (2013)
  - Total: 612
  - Density: 195/sq mi (75.3/km^{2})
- Time zone: UTC+1 (CET)
  - Summer (DST): UTC+2 (CEST)

Podvinjci is a village in the municipality of Visoko, Bosnia and Herzegovina.

== Demographics ==
According to the 2013 census, its population was 612.

Ethnicity in 2013
Ethnicity	Number	Percentage
Bosniaks	609	99.5%
Serbs	1	0.2%
other/undeclared	2	0.3%
Total	612	100%
