= Brezovik, Visoko =

Brezovik Брезовик
- Village
- Location within Bosnia and Herzegovina
- Coordinates: 44.0541877°N 17.9979743°E
- Country: Bosnia and Herzegovina
- Entity: Federation of Bosnia and Herzegovina
- Canton: Zenica-Doboj
- Municipality: Visoko

Area
  - Total: 1.03 sq mi (2.68 km^{2})

Population (2013)
  - Total: 11
  - Density: 11/sq mi (4.1/km^{2})
- Time zone: UTC+1 (CET)
  - Summer (DST): UTC+2 (CEST)

Brezovik is a village in the municipality of Visoko, Bosnia and Herzegovina.

== Demographics ==
According to the 2013 census, its population was 11, all Bosniaks.
