= Tramošnjik =

- Village
- Location within Bosnia and Herzegovina
- Coordinates: 44.0169756°N 18.1909208°E
- Country: Bosnia and Herzegovina
- Entity: Federation of Bosnia and Herzegovina
- Canton: Zenica-Doboj
- Municipality: Visoko

Area
  - Total: 0.50 sq mi (1.30 km^{2})

Population (2013)
  - Total: 345
  - Density: 687/sq mi (265/km^{2})
- Time zone: UTC+1 (CET)
  - Summer (DST): UTC+2 (CEST)

Tramošnjik is a village in the municipality of Visoko, Bosnia and Herzegovina.

== Demographics ==
According to the 2013 census, its population was 345.

Ethnicity in 2013
Ethnicity	Number	Percentage
Bosniaks	342	99.1%
other/undeclared	3	0.9%
Total	345	100%
