= Gornja Vratnica =

- Village
- Location within Bosnia and Herzegovina
- Coordinates: 44.0116213°N 18.2146235°E
- Country: Bosnia and Herzegovina
- Entity: Federation of Bosnia and Herzegovina
- Canton: Zenica-Doboj
- Municipality: Visoko

Area
  - Total: 1.08 sq mi (2.81 km^{2})

Population (2013)
  - Total: 450
  - Density: 410/sq mi (160/km^{2})
- Time zone: UTC+1 (CET)
  - Summer (DST): UTC+2 (CEST)

Gornja Vratnica is a village in the municipality of Visoko, Bosnia and Herzegovina.

== Demographics ==
According to the 2013 census, its population was 450.

Ethnicity in 2013
Ethnicity	Number	Percentage
Bosniaks	443	98.4%
other/undeclared	7	1.6%
Total	450	100%
