= Smršnica =

- Village
- Location within Bosnia and Herzegovina
- Coordinates: 44.0416951°N 18.1781803°E
- Country: Bosnia and Herzegovina
- Entity: Federation of Bosnia and Herzegovina
- Canton: Zenica-Doboj
- Municipality: Visoko

Area
  - Total: 1.03 sq mi (2.68 km^{2})

Population (2013)
  - Total: 264
  - Density: 255/sq mi (98.5/km^{2})
- Time zone: UTC+1 (CET)
  - Summer (DST): UTC+2 (CEST)

Smršnica is a village in the municipality of Visoko, Bosnia and Herzegovina.

== Demographics ==
According to the 2013 census, its population was 264.

Ethnicity in 2013
Ethnicity	Number	Percentage
Bosniaks	260	98.5%
other/undeclared	4	1.5%
Total	264	100%
