= Šerefudin's White Mosque =

Mosque in Visoko, Bosnia and Herzegovina

- Šerefudinova Bijela džamija
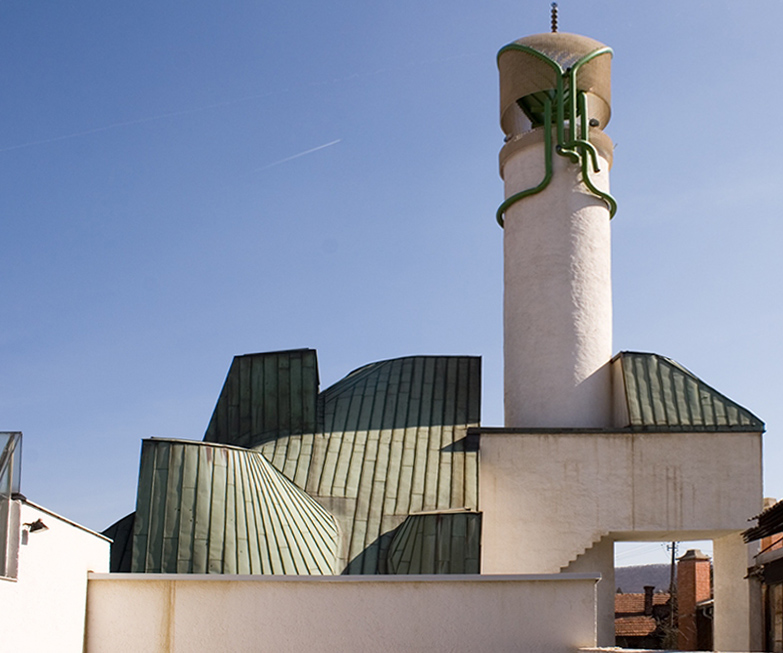

- Location of the mosque in Bosnia and Herzegovina

Religion
- Affiliation: Islam
- Ecclesiastical or organizational status: Mosque
- Status: Active

Location
- Location: Visoko
- Country: Bosnia and Herzegovina
- Interactive map of Šerefudin's White Mosque
- Coordinates: 43°59′07″N 18°10′49″E

Architecture
- Architect: Zlatko Ugljen
- Type: Mosque
- Style: Postmodern
- Completed: 1980

Specifications
- Dome: 1
- Minaret: 1
- Materials: Concrete; mortar; timber; travertine tiles; iron; carpet

The Šerefudin's White Mosque (Bosnian: Šerefudinova Bijela džamija) is a mosque in Visoko, Bosnia and Herzegovina. The original mosque was built in 1477, and it was completely reconstructed and finished in 1980 under architect Zlatko Ugljen. In 1983 it received the Aga Khan Award for Architecture. The jury commended the mosque for its boldness, creativity and brilliance, as well as its originality and innovation. In 2007 Hungarian architects called it one of the three best designed places of worship in Europe.

== Architecture ==
The mosque comprises an access space and first sahn, the prayer hall, an annex, a graveyard, and minarets.

The central space of the mosque is designed both for praying and other religious activities such as lectures and discussions. The indoor area for praying is an annex building. The annex consists of a small auditorium and an office. Traditionally, in Bosnian mosques, graveyards act as a buffer between mosque and other buildings, but in this case, the graveyard is isolated.

Ugljen used the traditional layout of Bosnian mosques which consist of a courtyard leading to a square praying area, over which rises a cupola. The difference is in an unusual arrangement of this concept, where large glass panels make this mosque more integrated with the rest of the building. Windows with five panels symbolizes Five Pillars of Islam, but also casts light in the interior. The southeast facade of the cupola is faced toward the Ka'ba. Fountains, pulpit and other decorative elements are simple, such as the calligraphy in the interior which is simple and readable. Both the interior and exterior of the mosque are painted white, while the beige color was used for the floor, and green for a few metallic elements, like frames and tubes.

Building materials used were plastered concrete for walls and cupola, white mortar for the inner walls, a combination of pine wood and white mortar for surfaces of many interior elements, local travertine tiles for exterior paths and courtyard paving, and iron tubes for minarets, while the floors inside of the mosque are covered with green carpet.

=== Aga Khan Award for Architecture ===
The Aga Khan Development Network listed the mosque as one of the most valuable modern mosques built in Bosnia and Herzegovina, stating:

"Its geometrically simple plan encloses a complex, slope-ceilinged, skylit volume, pure, abstract, sparsely ornamented and painted white. The archetypal Bosnian mosque has a simple square plan crowned by a cupola and entered by means of a small porch. The White Mosque's plan conforms to the archetype, but its roof is a freely deformed quarter of a cupola, pierced by five skylights... The effect is one of confrontation between the elementary plan and the sophisticated hierarchy of roof cones. The principal symbolic elements, mihrab, minbar, minaret and fountains, have a fresh folk art character subtly enhanced by the avant-garde geometries of their setting."

== Gallery ==
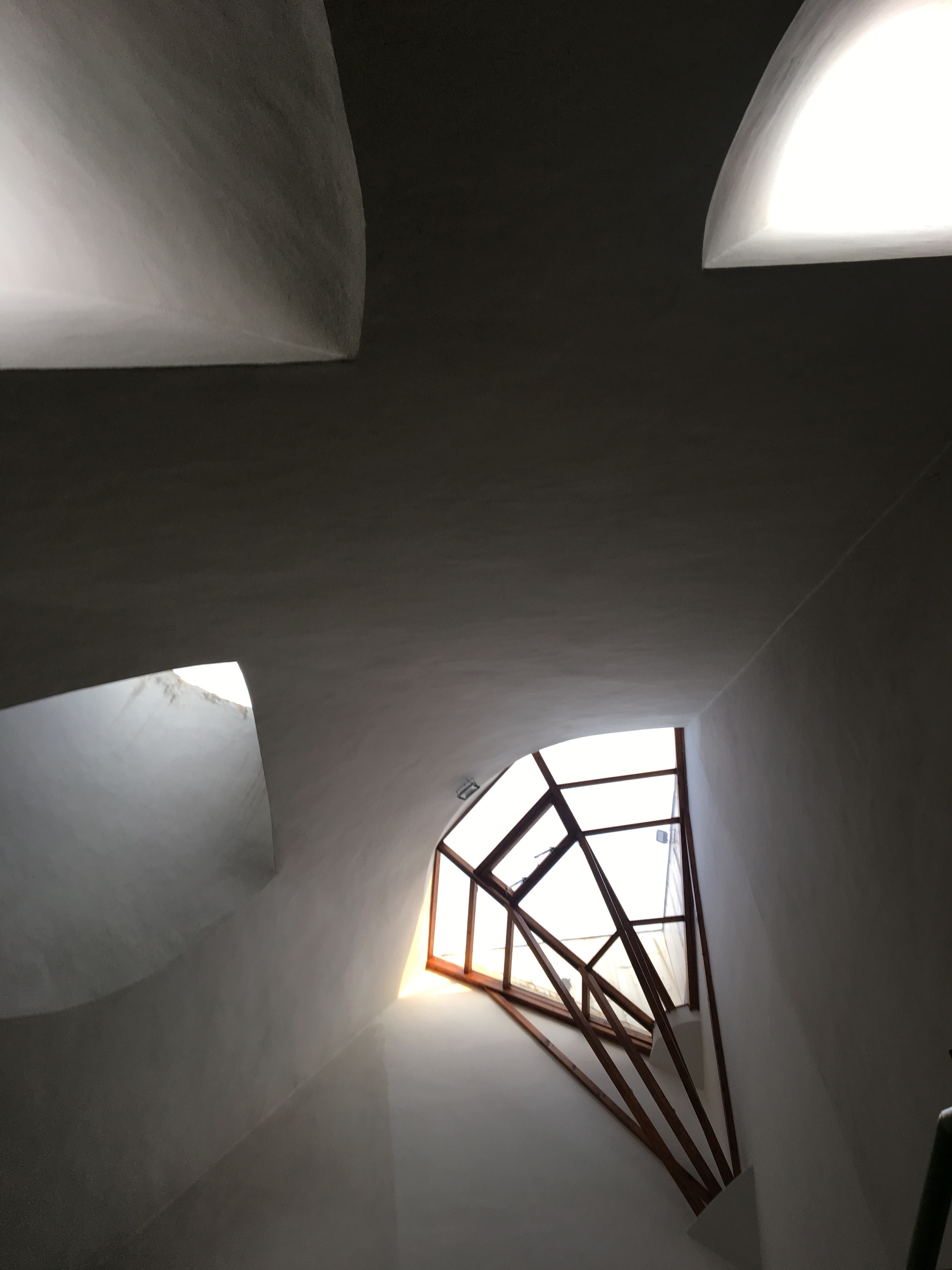
Skylights in the interior of the mosque

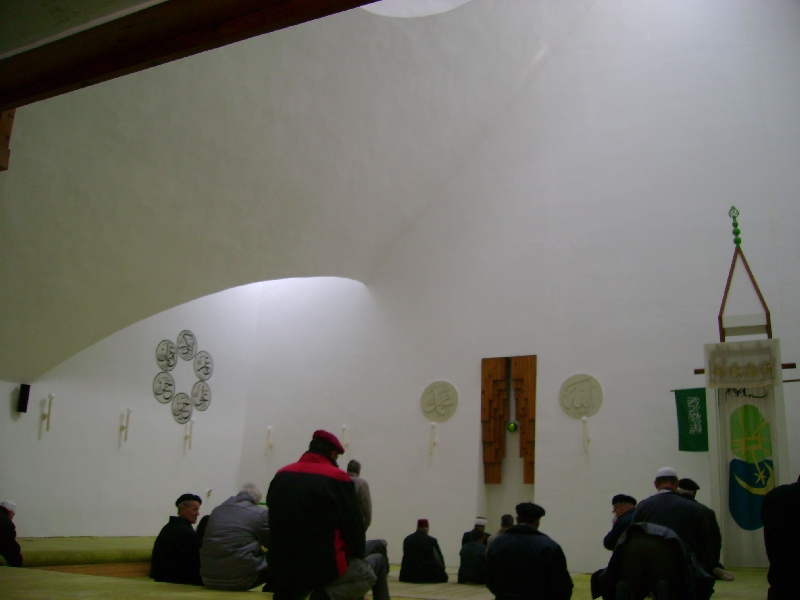
Interior of the mosque

== See also ==
- Islam in Bosnia and Herzegovina
- List of mosques in Bosnia and Herzegovina
- Architecture in Bosnia and Herzegovina
