= Zlatko Ugljen =

Bosnian architect (born c. 1929)

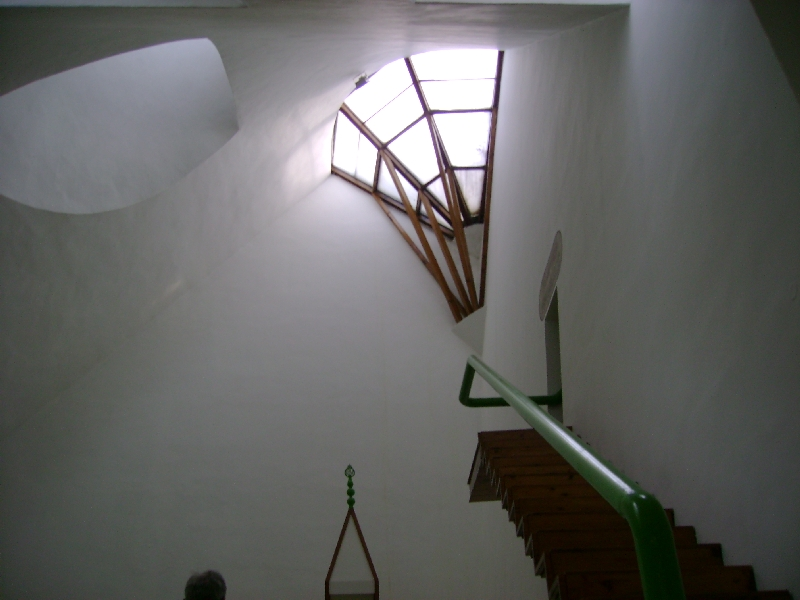
Interior of Visoko's White Mosque

Zlatko Ugljen (born 13 September 1929) is a Bosnian architect. He was born in Mostar in 1929. His work includes economic buildings, private housing, memorials, religious buildings, and cultural institutions. A significant part of his oeuvre consists of Islamic and Catholic sacred buildings. Among his most famous sacred buildings is the White Mosque in Visoko, for which he received the Aga Khan Award for Architecture in 1983.

== Awards ==
- The April 6th City of Sarajevo Award, 1963
- Federal awards "Borba" for architecture, 1978
- Aga Khan Award for Architecture, 1983
- Bosnia and Herzegovina July 27 Awards, 1983
- Sarajevo Society of Architects Award, 1980
- Award of the Association of Applied Artists of Bosnia and Herzegovina, 1963
