= Visočka pečenica =

Permanent charcuterie

Visočka pečenica is a meat product from the municipality Visoko in Bosnia and Herzegovina. It is made of beef parts, primarily thighs, back and after being salted it also gets smoked and dried.

== Description ==
The production of visočka pečenica is based on multilayered traditional recipes and involves manual work in. Fresh beef of well-fed animals not younger than three years old is used. Meat pieces from the back and thighs that are being dried are usually 10 to 20 cm wide and 20 to 70 cm long. A back piece is on average between 4 and 7 cm thick and 20 cm wide, while its length can vary for more than a meter. Pieces of meat are subsequently salted, linked with hemp rope and placed on hazelnut wooden sticks. Smoking in cold temperatures is performed on smokehouse floors and beech or common hornbeam are used to produce the smoke. Smoking duration depends on weather conditions and is usually a period from 7 to 15 days. After that, the product gets fermented in a dark room at temperatures between 12 and 18 °C for additional ten days, after which it receives its typical color, smell and aroma.

== History and protected geographical indication ==
The region of Visoko is known for its long-century tradition of skin processing which has led to the production of a significant excess of meat which was mainly conserved using salt and drying. One of the main reasons for the protected geographical indication was plagiarism and deviation of traditional recipes. Some producers could reduce the maintenance of meat to two or three days which sped up the process but led to the loss of trademark taste. On the basis of the requirements of the Association of meat processors (Bosnian: Proizvođači Visočke pečenice i sudžuke" (ViPS)) and at the recommendation of the Commission of origin registration, the Food Safety Agency of Bosnia and Herzegovina put forward the resolution on 5 June 2020. The resolution of the protected geographical indication "visočka pečenica" was then put forward.

== Sources ==
- Ganić, Amir (2018), Proizvođačka specifikacija za zaštitu geografskog porijekla "Visočke pečenice" (PDF), Udruženje mesoprerađivača "Visočka pečenica i sudžuka" (ViPS)

=== Other literature ===
- Zaštita zemljopisnog podrijetla "Visočke pečenice"
- Utjecaj različitih količina dodane kuhinjske soli na senzorna svojstva "Visočke pečenice"
