= Ayas Pasha of Bosnia =

Bosnian sanjak-bey, founder of Visoko

Ajas-bey Pasha
- Ajaz-beg
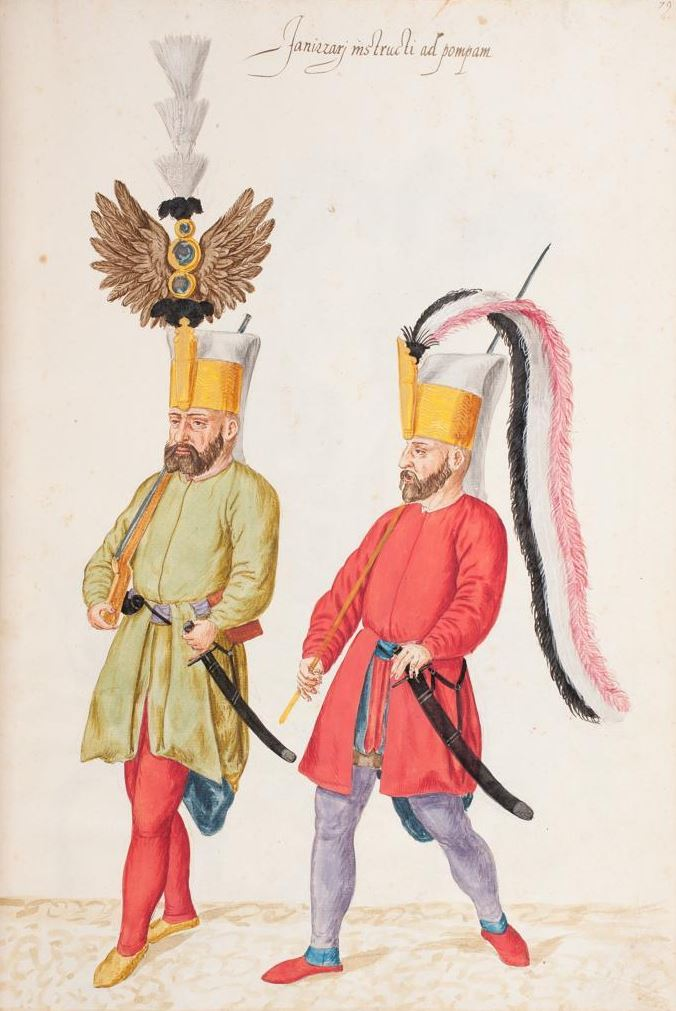
- Ajas Pasha

Sanjak-bey of Bosnia
- In office 1470–1474
- Monarch: Mehmed II
- Preceded by: Isa-beg Isaković
- Succeeded by: Sinan-beg
- In office 1477–1478
- Monarch: Mehmed II
- Preceded by: Bali-beg Malkočević
- Succeeded by: Skender Pasha
- In office 1483–1484
- Monarch: Bayezid II
- Preceded by: Jahja-beg
- Succeeded by: Mehmed-beg Ishaković

Sanjak-bey of Herzegovina
- In office 1478–1480
- In office 1481–1483
- Monarch: Bayezid II

Personal details
- Born: Unknown
- Died: 1486 Visoko, Ottoman Empire
- Occupation: Governor

Military service
- Allegiance: Ottoman Empire
- Rank: Pasha

Ajas Pasha (? - Anatolia, 1486) was a Bosnian sanjak-bey and later pasha in Ottoman service.

== Career ==
He was sanjak-bey of Bosnia, referred to as the Lord of the King's land, from 1470 to 1475, 1477 to 1478 and in 1483, and ruled as sanjak-bey of Herzegovina, also referred to as Herzegovina's Krajisnik or Duke of the Herzeg's land, from 1478 to 1480 and 1481 to 1483. In 1472 he raided the Croatian Littoral, Istria and Friuli regions. In November 1481 he besieged Herceg Novi, capturing the city the same year December 14th after Duke Vlatko Hercegović gave up defending it and agreed to surrender. For this Ajas was awarded the title of pasha.

== Achievements ==
He played a key role in the development of Visoko from a Bosnian medieval type of town to an Ottoman styled urban organization. He legalized his vakf in 1477 hammam, shops, mekteb, water supply system, bridge on river Bosna, shadirvan, medrese and Nakshbandi tekija which he built in Visoko. He personally commissioned the construction of all these structures and buildings.

== See also ==
- List of Ottoman governors of Bosnia
