= Visoko =

- City
- Grad Visoko; City of Visoko
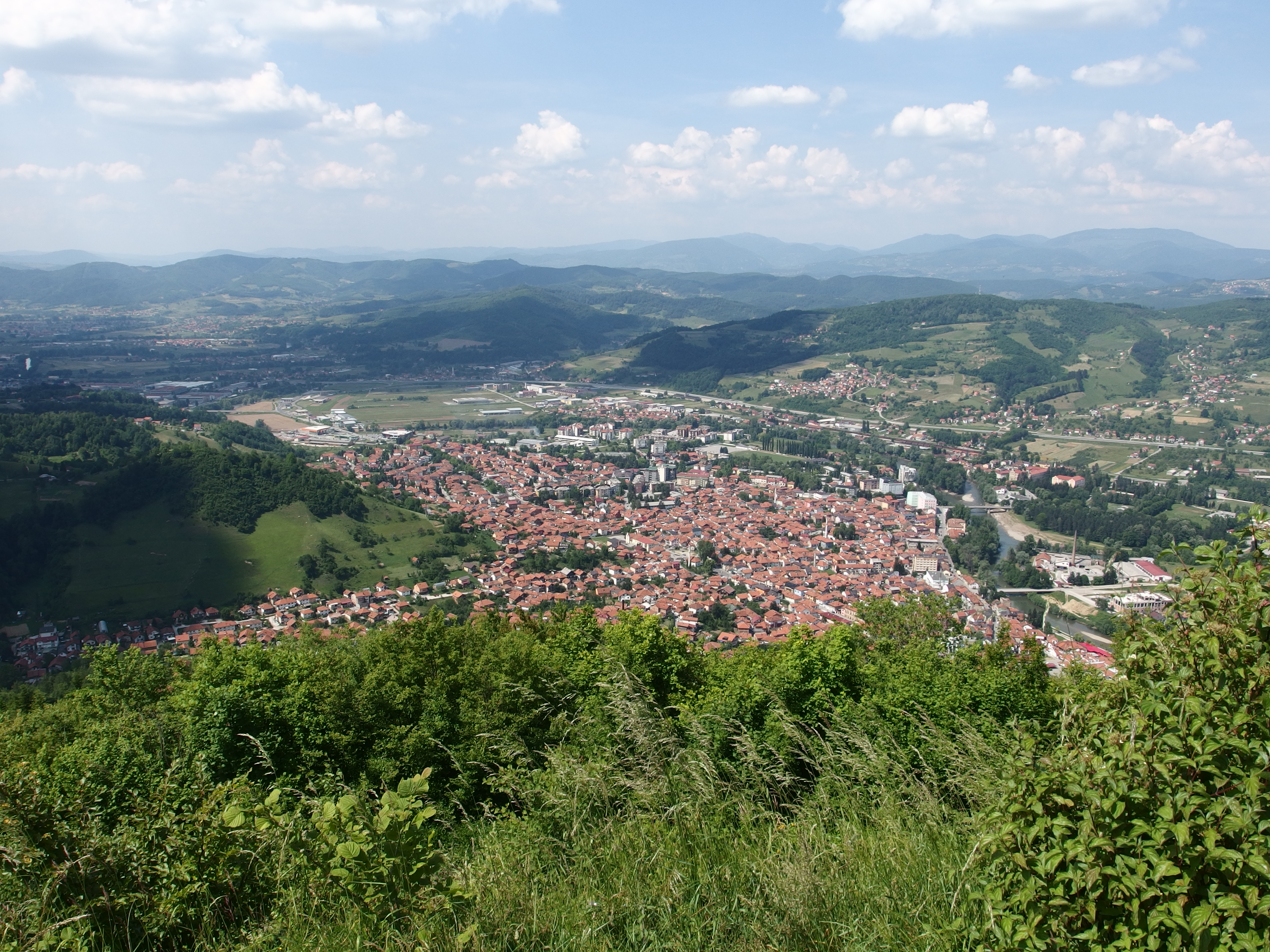
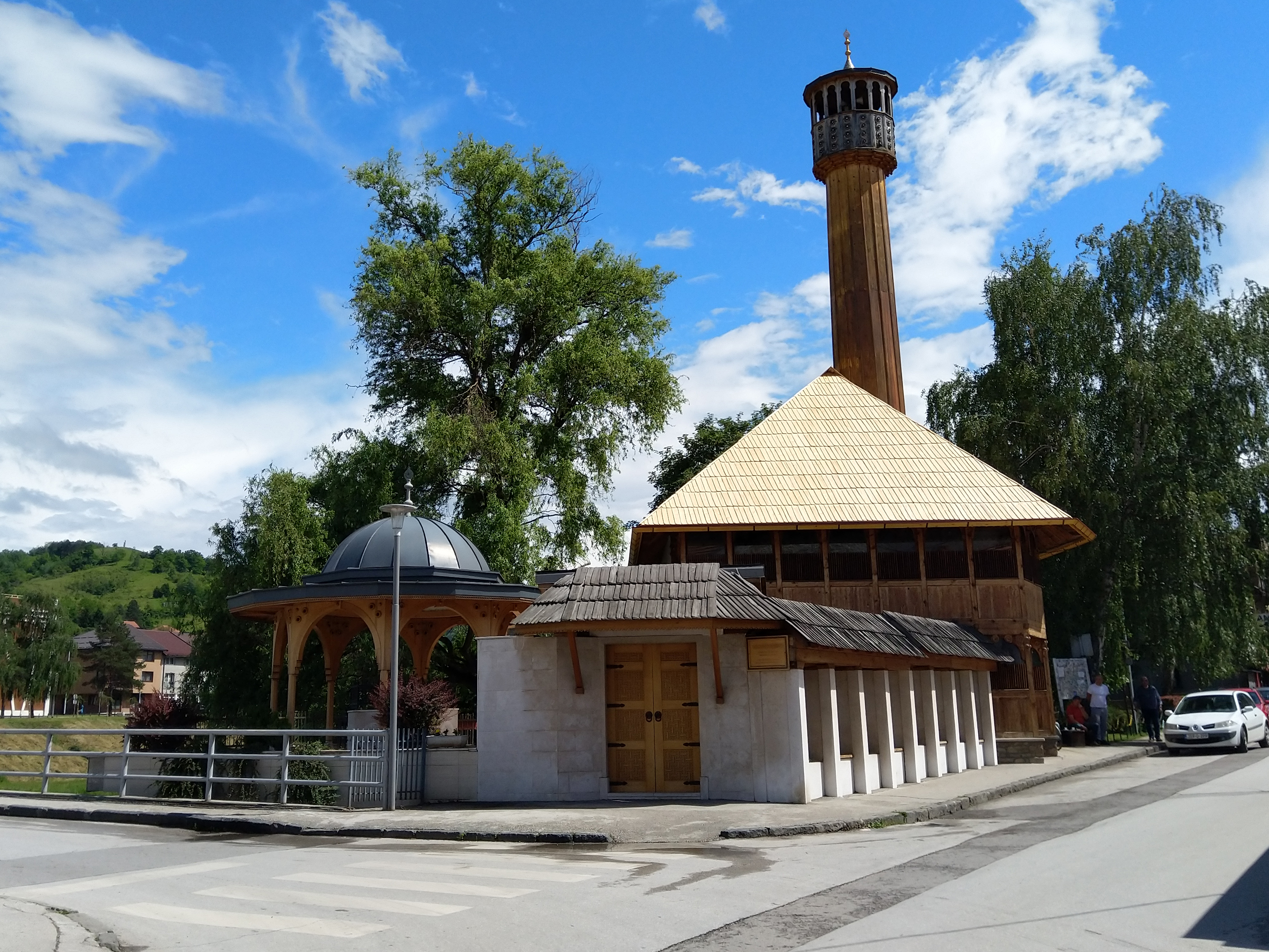
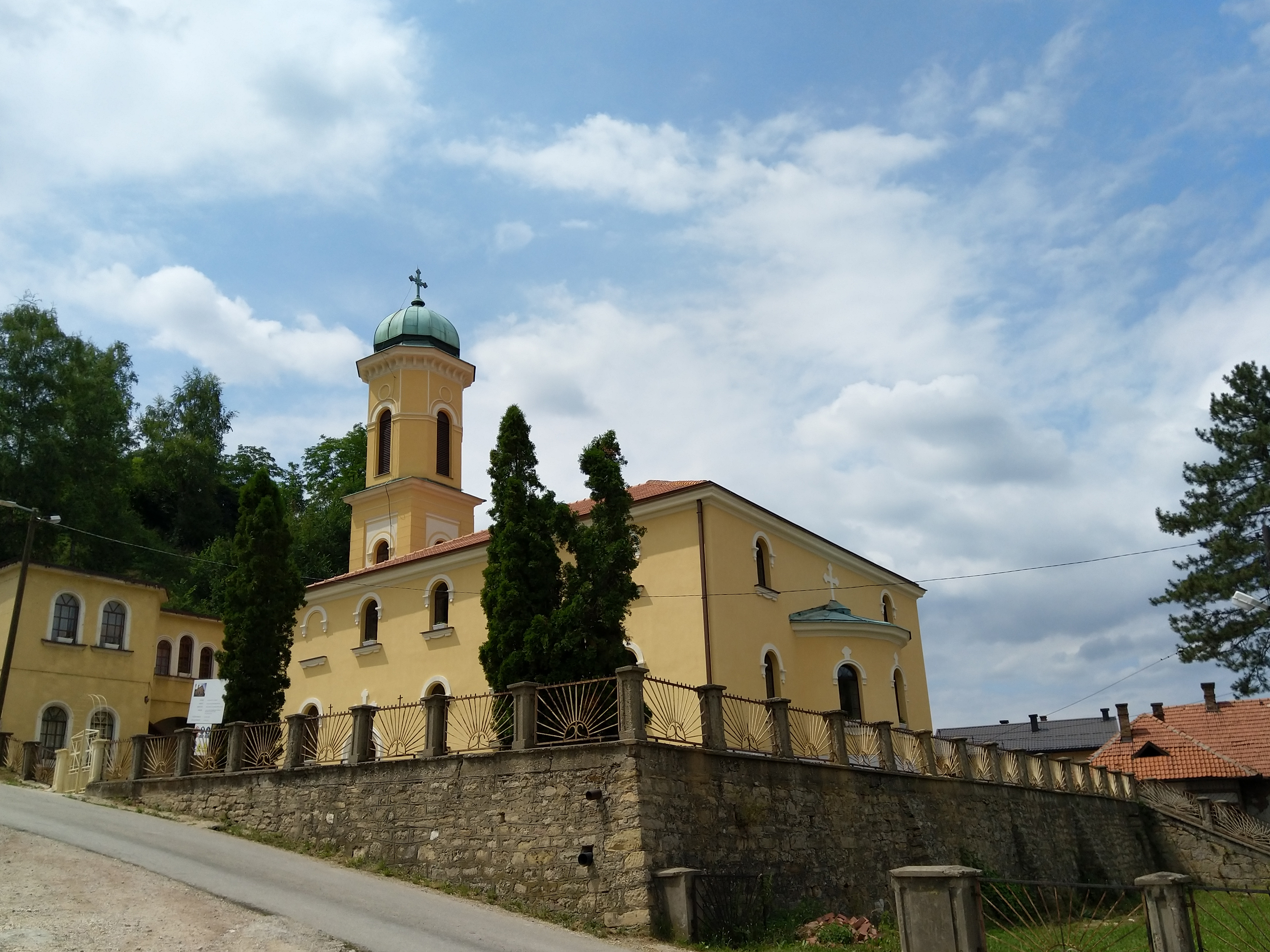
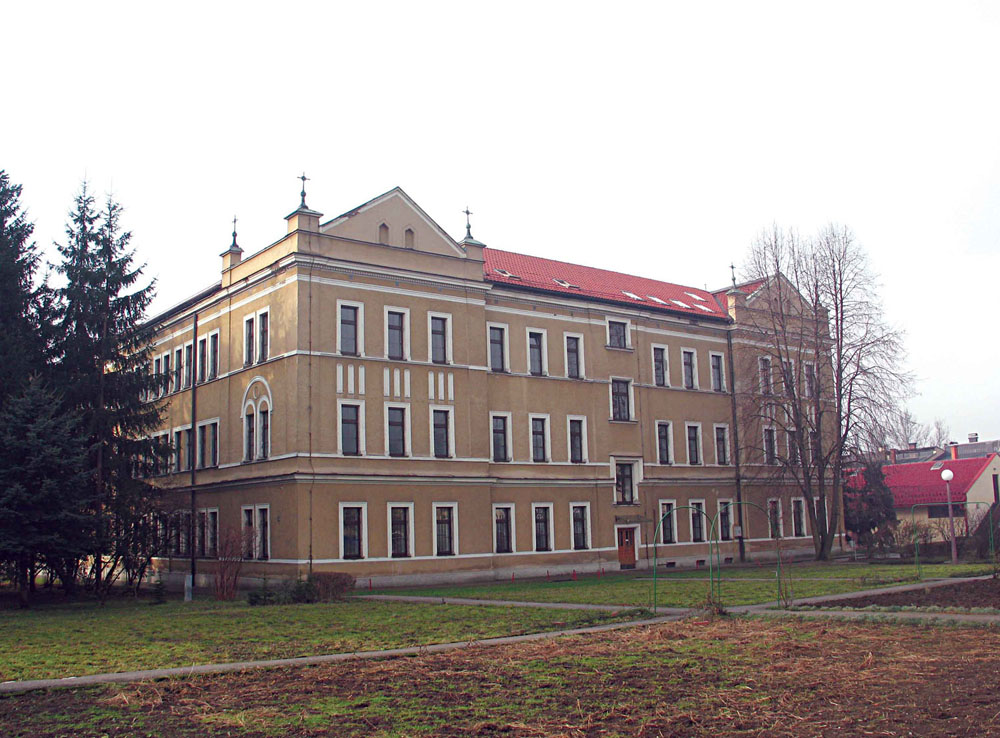
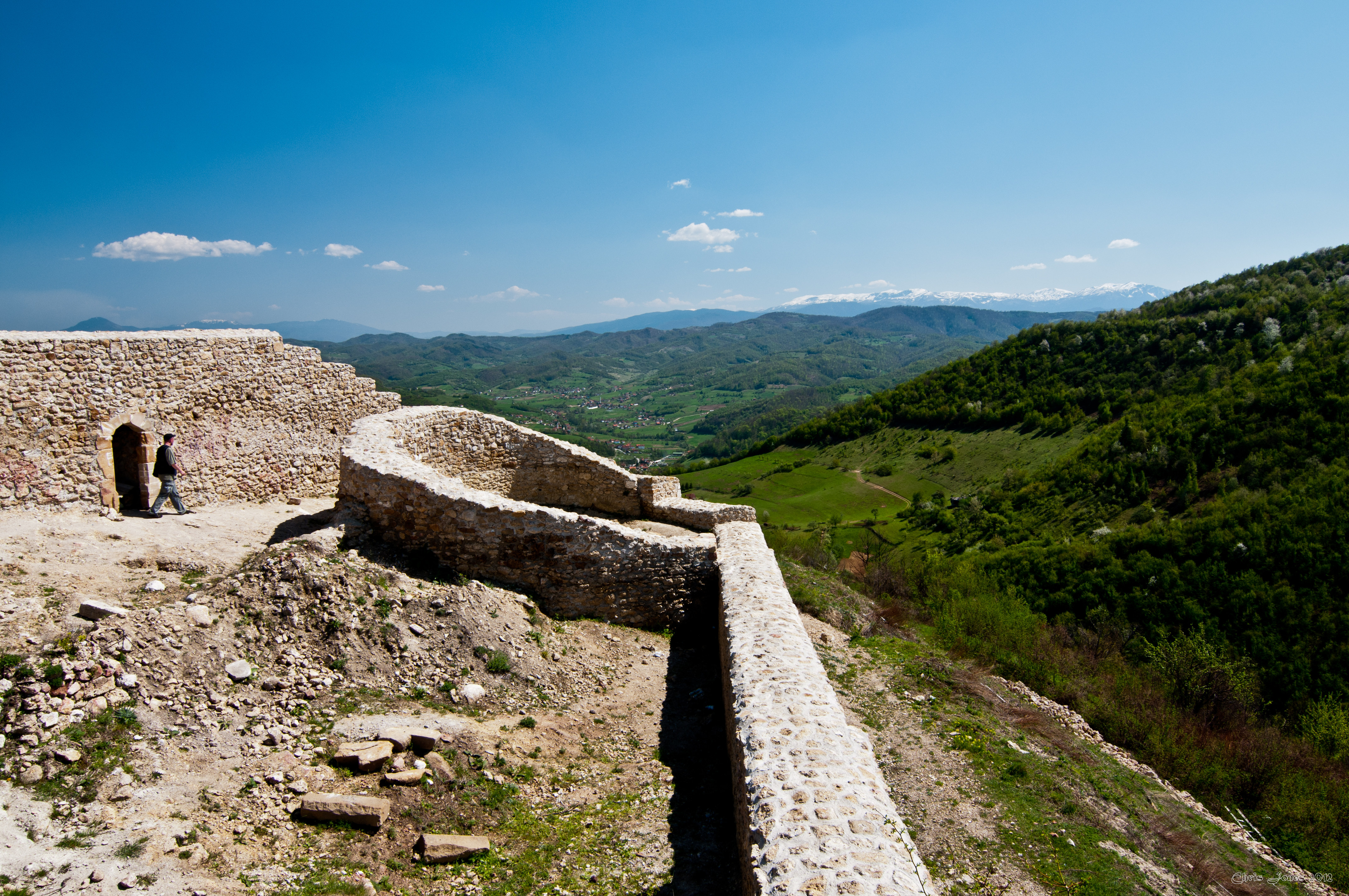
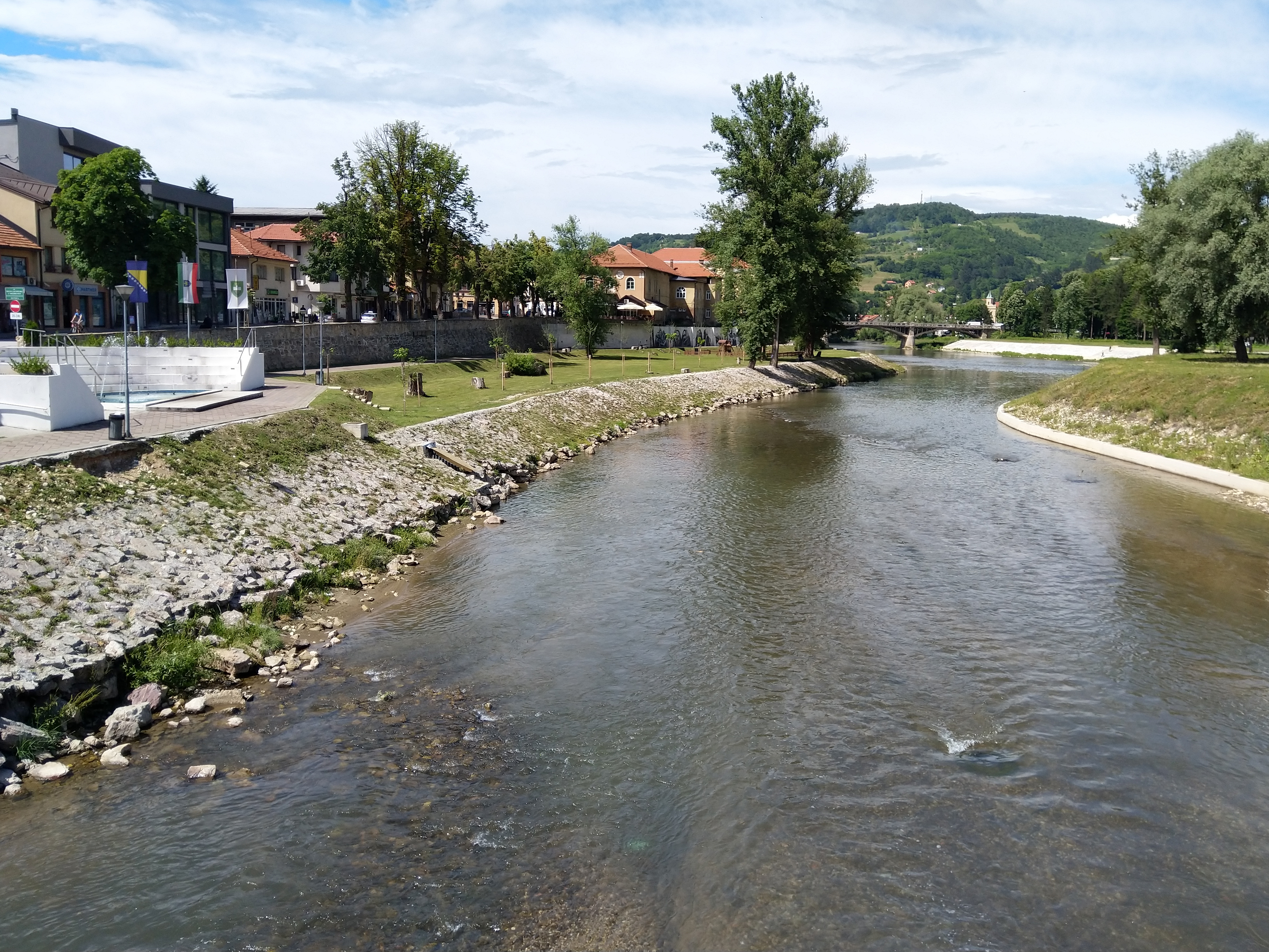
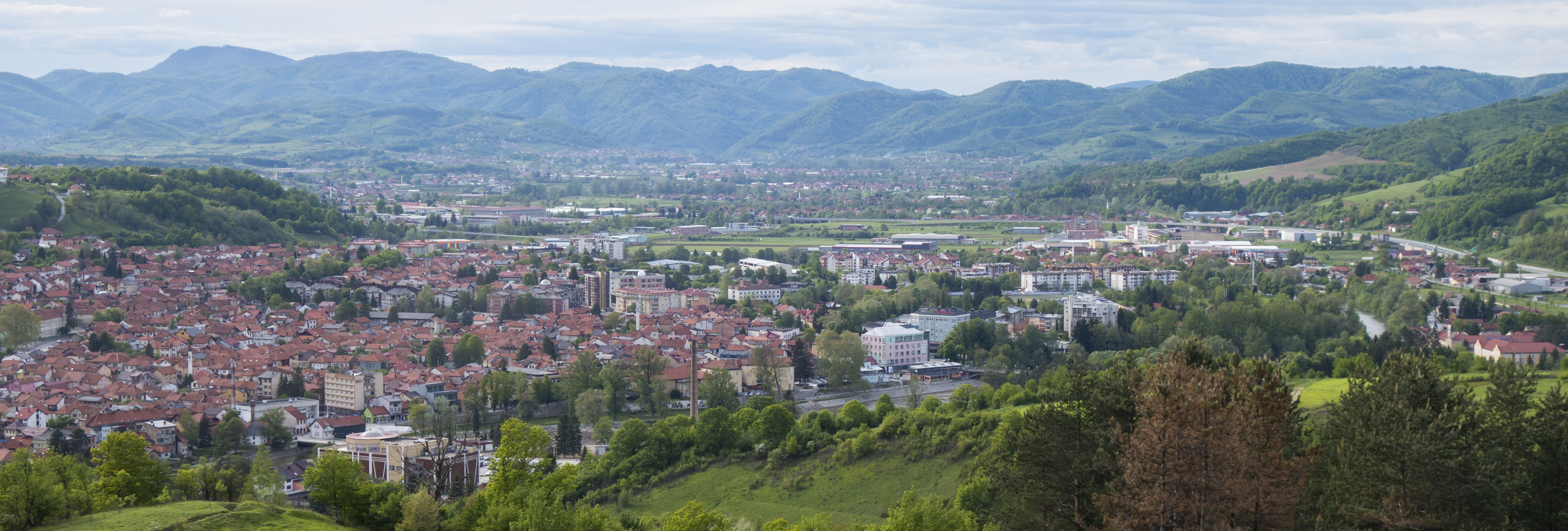
- Top to bottom, left to right: View from Visočica hill, Tabačka mosque, Church of St. Procopius, Franciscan monastery of St. Bonaventure, Old town of Visoki, Fojnička River at the confluence with River Bosna, View from Vrela hill

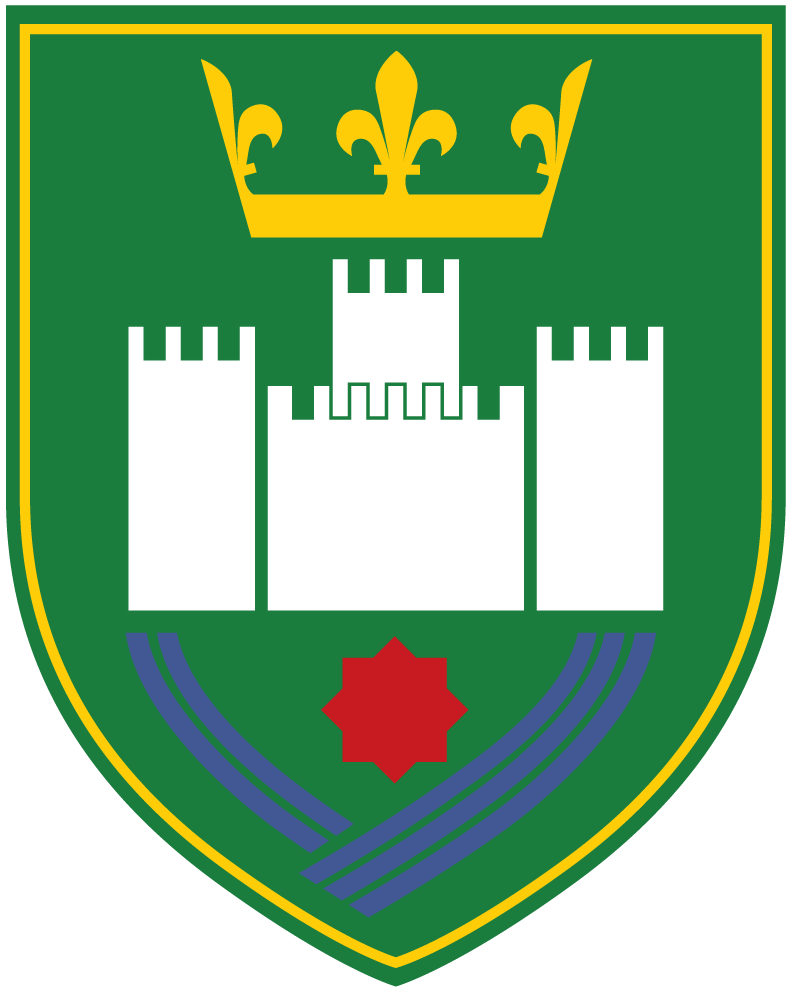
- Seal

- Location of municipality within Bosnia and Herzegovina

- Location within Bosnia and Herzegovina
- Coordinates: 43°59′N 18°10′E
- Country: Bosnia and Herzegovina
- Entity: Federation of Bosnia and Herzegovina
- Canton: Zenica-Doboj

Government
  - Mayor: Mirza Ganić (SDA)

Area
  - City: 230.8 km^{2} (89.1 sq mi)

Population (2013)
  - City: 39,938
  - Density: 80/km^{2} (206/sq mi)
  - Urban: 11,205
- Time zone: UTC+1 (CET)
  - Summer (DST): UTC+2 (CEST)
- Postal code: 71300
- Area code: +387 32
- Website: www.visoko.gov.ba

Visoko (pronounced [ʋǐsɔkɔː]) is a city located in the Zenica-Doboj Canton of the Federation of Bosnia and Herzegovina, an entity of Bosnia and Herzegovina. As of 2013, the municipality had a population of 39,938 inhabitants with 11,205 living in Visoko town. Located between Zenica and Sarajevo, Visoko lies where the river Fojnica joins the Bosna.

The Visoko region has evidence of long continuous occupation, with the first traces of life dating back to the 5th millennium BC. Archaeological excavations of Okolište have found one of the biggest Neolithic settlements of the Butmir culture in southeastern Europe.

It was an early political and commercial center of the Bosnian medieval state, and the site where the first Bosnian king Tvrtko I was crowned. The Old town Visoki, located on Visočica hill, was a politically important fortress, and its inner bailey Podvisoki was an early example of a Bosnian medieval urban area. After the fall of the Kingdom of Bosnia, medieval Visoko grew as an Ottoman town. A key role in its development was played by the local Bosnian Ajas-pasha.

Ottoman rule ended in 1878 when the Bosnian Vilayet was occupied by Austria-Hungary. On 11 November 1911, in the last years of Austro-Hungarian rule, it was almost completely burned down by an accidental fire. Before the Bosnian War, Visoko was the largest exporter of textile and leather in socialist Yugoslavia As of 2006, Visoko attracts tens of thousands of tourists every year, mainly because of Semir Osmanagić's claims.

== Etymology ==
Before the construction and naming of the hilltop fortress Visoki, the region centered on the Visoko valley was commonly referred to simply as Bosna. The name Visoko derives from the Slavic adjective visok, meaning "high" or "elevated", referring to the town’s original medieval fortress location atop Visočica Hill. The fortified town, known as Visoki, is first mentioned in a 14th-century charter issued by Ban Tvrtko I in 1355. The settlement below the hill was later referred to as Podvisoki ("below Visoki"), which gradually developed into the modern town of Visoko. Consequently, the older toponym Bosna fell into disuse in naming the town, remaining mainly as a designation for the broader medieval polity rather than the specific settlement.

== Geography ==
The Visoko municipality covers 232 square kilometres with several characteristic, morphologically distinctive valleys formed by the foothills of the Central Bosnian mountains including Ozren, Vranica and Zvijezda. The altitude of the region ranges from 400 to 1,050 metres. Visoko's natural environment is defined by the river-valleys of the Bosna and Fojnica rivers which converge near the town. The Bosna River, one of the country’s main waterways, flows northward through the municipality and historically provided trade and transport links. The Fojnica River, a tributary, further shaped the fertile basin around the settlement. Numerous smaller streams and creeks descend from the hills, contributing to a relatively dense hydrographic network. The municipality borders the towns of Kiseljak, Busovača, Kakanj, Vareš, Breza, Ilijaš and Ilidža. The climate of Visoko is continental, with moderately cold winters and warm summers, influenced by its inland location and surrounding mountains.

== Infrastructure ==
Visoko is directly connected to a highway along the main Sarajevo–Zenica corridor part of the European route E73 (A1 motorway) which directly connects it with Zenica and Sarajevo, which then continues to M17 road. It is connected to other places by the regional road R443 (Visoko - Kiseljak - Kreševo - Tarčin). The railway line that runs through Visoko links the municipality not only to Sarajevo and Zenica but also to the Adriatic coast.

== Demographics ==
Population of Visoko municipality
| Census | 2013 | 1991 | 1981 | 1971 |
|---|---|---|---|---|
| Bosniaks | 36,697 (91.88%) | 34,373 (74.46%) | 28,838 (70.50%) | 25,683 (72.34%) |
| Serbs | 286 (0.71%) | 7,471 (16.18%) | 6,831 (16.70%) | 7,166 (20.18%) |
| Croats | 576 (1.44%) | 1,872 (4.05%) | 1,879 (4.59%) | 1,914 (5.39%) |
| Yugoslavs | 0.00 (0.00%) | 1,464 (3.17%) | 2,783 (6.80%) | 392 (1.10%) |
| Others | 2,062 (5.16%) | 980 (2.12%) | 570 (1.39%) | 348 (0.98%) |
| Total | 39,938 | 46,160 | 40,901 | 35,503 |

== History ==
=== Prehistoric era ===
The Visoko region shows evidence of long continuous occupation, with the first traces of life dating back to Paleolithic. Because of the two rivers that go through Visoko, the Bosna and Fojnica, the Visoko basin was always fertile land for agriculture. In the Neolithic period, the area of Central Bosnia played an important role as a mediator between the settlements of Adriatic Coast and the central Balkans. These metropolitan areas were connected by Neretva and Bosna rivers. Since Visoko was situated on the Bosna River, it has gained a lot of economic traffic between the two larger cities. Neolithic emplacements were founded on the shores of the rivers in places known today as Arnautovići, Donje Moštre, Okolište, Zbilje, Ginje, and Dvor. Arnautovići and Okolište were identified as part of Kakanj culture.

In September 2007 the National Museum of Bosnia and Herzegovina continued archaeological excavations of Okolište, where it is estimated that around 3,000 people lived in the fortified settlement during the Neolithic Age making it one of the biggest in Southeastern Europe. This settlement belonged to the Butmir culture. The age of settlement is estimated by Radiocarbon dating to be around 4700 to 4500 years BC. Later on, neolithic cultures came in contact with other cultures like Baden. Around 3000 B.C.E. first signs of Chalcolithic culture appear which can be contributed to Vučedol culture of south Bosnian type, with findings in Donje Moštre and at the location of Old town of Visoki.

=== Illyria and Roman Empire ===
The Visoko area was inhabited by the Illyirian tribe of Daesitiates. They descended from Bronze Age and Iron Age culture called Central Bosnian culture group which was closely related to Glasinac culture. Best known archaeological evidence is grave of group of warriors dated to 4 B.C.E. found in Gornji Skladovi, Vratnica. The Roman Empire established its rule in 9 AD and built roads and fortresses in places like Kralupi, Seoča and Mokronozi. Area of Visoko was part of Roman province Illyricum.

=== Medieval Bosnia (958–1463) ===
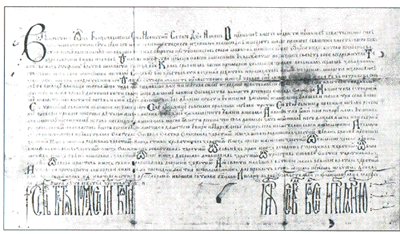
Charter of Tvrtko I Kotromanić

Migration period saw introduction of new people to the Balkans - Slavs. Native Illyirian tribes through time became slavicized, but a lot of toponyms remained Illyirian in origin, like in example name of the river Bosna, which is namesake of country itself, but also a term for settlement which was used to reference the place called Bosna that existed in today's area of Visoko. It is considered that this area in Visoko basin was nucleus of new medieval Bosnian state which emerged in around 1000 AD. Only later on with construction of Old town of Visoki the term Bosna for the settlement would be rarely used.

Visoko is named after the Visoki Castle and the town of Visoki, which occupied Visočica hill. Podvisoki, Mile (today's Arnautovići), Biskupići and Moštre – together known as Visoko valley - were the early center of the medieval Bosnian kingdom. Many historical charters were made and written in Visoko valley, including the charter of first Bosnian king Tvrtko I Kotromanić in 1355, in castro nostro Vizoka vocatum which was also the first direct mention of the town of Visoki. Visoki was also a place where many important documents and legislation of medieval Bosnia were signed and written. The town of Visoki had a defensive role in protecting trade center Podvisoki (Subvisoki) which was located just below the town and was one of earliest examples of the medieval urban environments in Bosnia. Podvisoki was long time main trade center in medieval Bosnia.

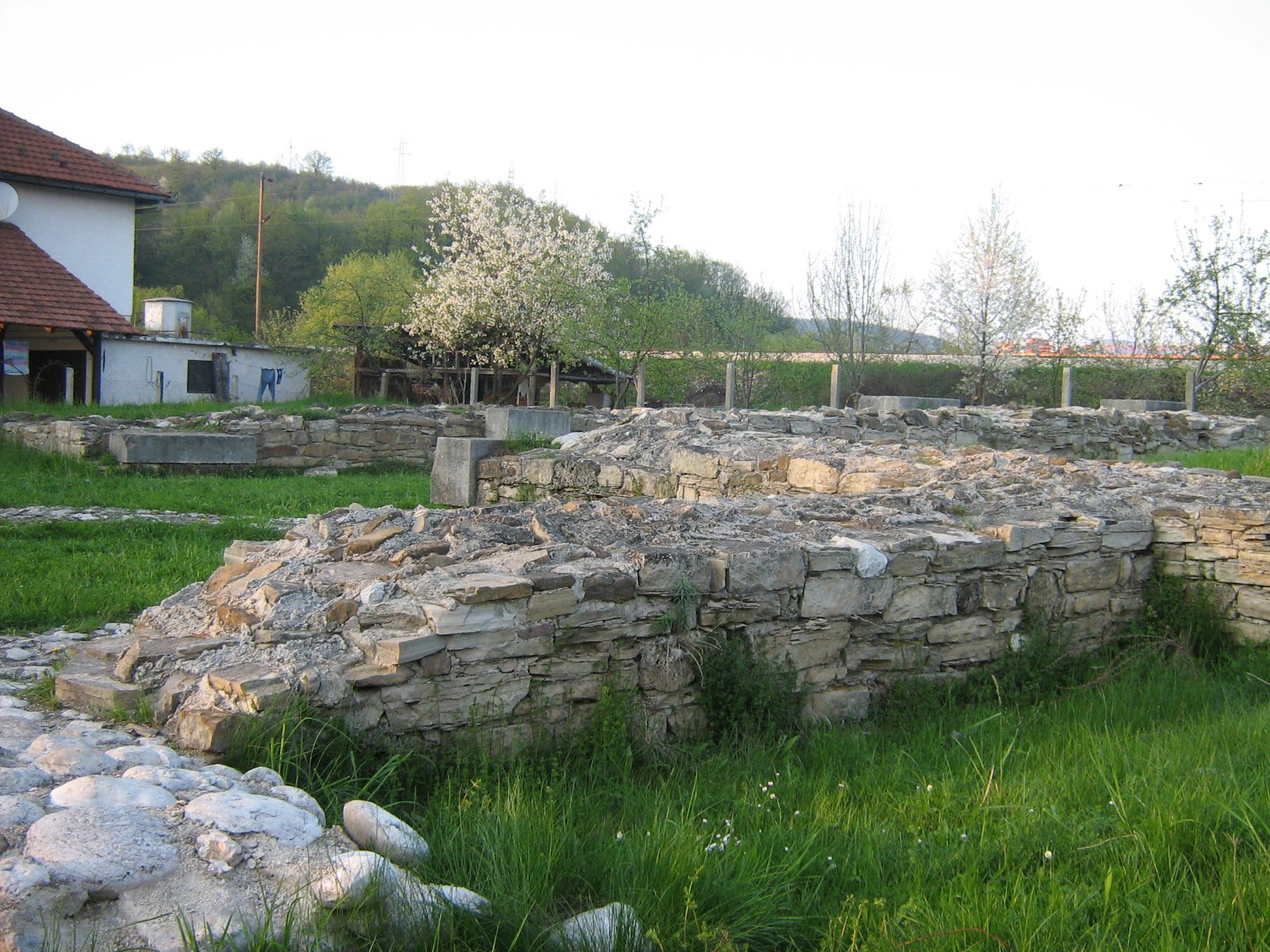
Medieval remains of Church in Mile

The Rusag met at Mile, where Tvrtko I was crowned in 1377 and eventually buried alongside his uncle, Stjepan II Kotromanić, the Ban of Bosnia who preceded him. The Medieval Bosnian State Archive was also located there. Mile is today known for its many ornamented tombs of kings, bans and other former rulers. Ban Kulin's Plate (dating from 1193) was discovered at Biskupići, along with the remains of another medieval church, grave sites and the foundations of several other contemporary structures. Moštre's university was knows for its scholarship in medicine, theology, cosmogeny and ethics, although because of its connection to the Bosnian Church, nothing remains of its archives. Its existence is documented only by a handful of references in the Vatican archives of its enemy, the Catholic Church.

Other notable medieval settlements in the vicinity included Sebinje town, Čajan town in Gračanica – which protected the roads between Visoko and Bobovac – and the town of Bedem i Goduša.

=== Ottoman Empire (1463–1878) ===
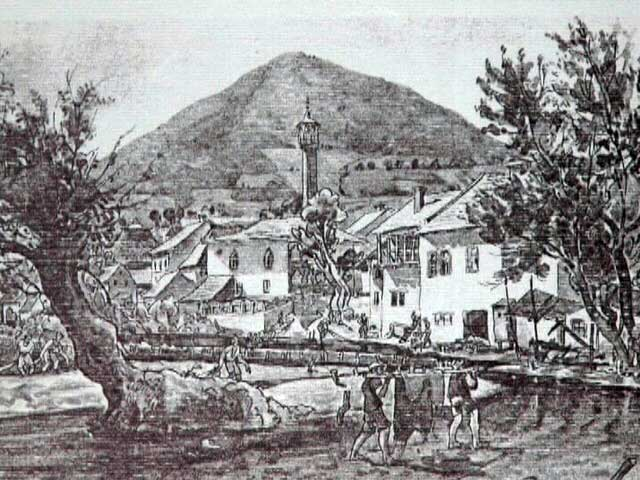
Painting of Visoko depicting the Ottoman time of governing Bosnia

The area of Visoko was conquered by Ottoman Empire around 1463, and it is from this time period that modern Visoko was formed. The founder of the town of Visoko was Ajas-beg (pasha), who was originally from Visoko but converted to Islam from Bogomilism. Visoko was a municipality at that time. From 1483, a voivod served at the head of the Visoko municipality, who together with the serdar (military commander) was the representative of the military and administration. The main imam (reisu-l-eimme), who existed in Visoko, fulfilled religious duties and duties to society. The court (or judicial) administration was carried out by the naib (or judge), who received help for bringing decisions by a jury of respected people from Visoko. The naib effected the law and his court according to sheriat.

During his rule, up to 1477, Ajas-beg built hammam, a religious primary school (mekteb), an aqueduct, bridge on the river Bosna, and a madrassa (Islamic high school), and also founded Dervish tekke (monastery), which is preserved to this day. In a short period, Visoko developed into the administrative center of the municipality and into the heart of trade and crafts, as well as the heart of cultural and spiritual life in the region. Visoko by then had the imbibe look of an Islamic oriental-style town with all the religious and cultural institutions.

=== Austro-Hungarian Empire (1878–1918) ===
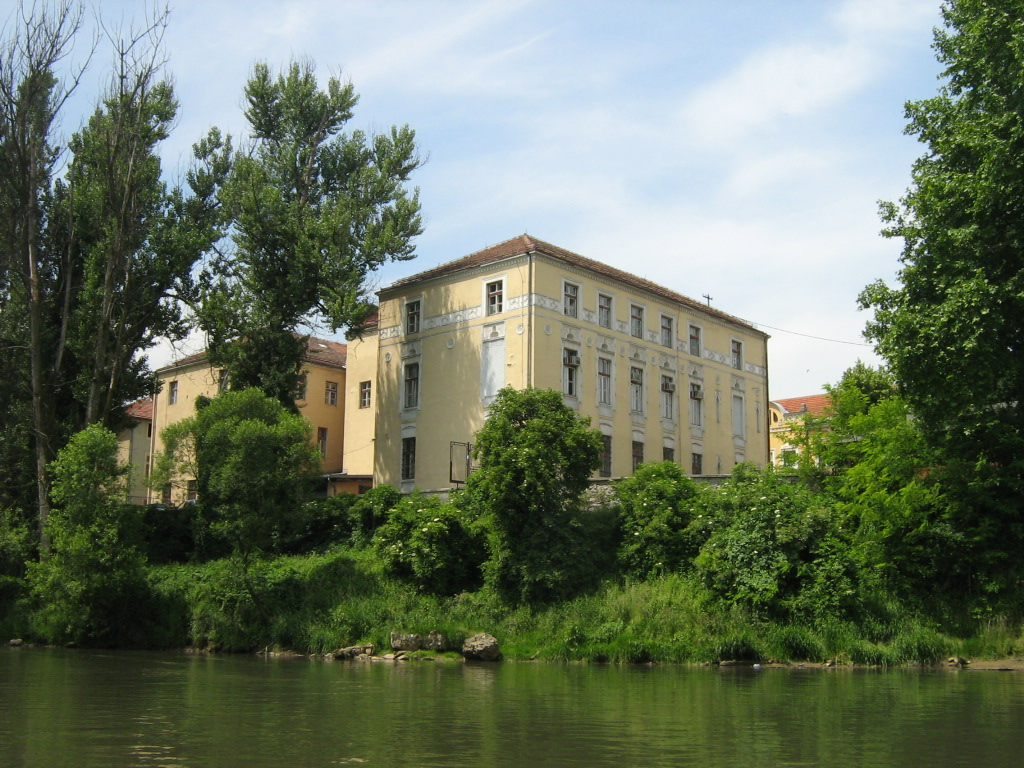
Example of building built in pseudo-Moorish style during Austro-Hungarian rule.

The Vilayet of Bosnia was occupied by Austro-Hungary in 1878 (officially annexed in 1908) and only small local militias showed resistance and fought. In the early years of Austro-Hungarian rule, Visoko did not significantly change and kept its oriental-style look. In 1882, Visoko was an organized settlement with developed trade, offices, and other institutions. Increasing contact with western culture directed Visoko's style in a slightly different way such that buildings of that time were built in Pseudo-Moorish style. The Tabhana mosque was founded in Visoko center and the city itself was expanded further to the banks of the Fojnica River. The main street was developed towards the town of Jalija, located at the delta of and a bridge across the Bosna River.

The first buildings of this period included the train station from 1882, the court building from 1895, a church with a Franciscan gymnasium (1899–1900), the municipality office, and a primary school from 1910. All were mainly built in the pseudo-Moorish style. Further development of the city was stalled by jangija, the big fire in 1911. The upper city area was completely burned, as well all the houses down the main street alongside Beledija, Shadrvan mosque and the high school. In all, 450 homes, stores and other small buildings were burned down. In the spring of 1912, the rebuilding of the city started and the government decided that all houses would be built with bricks and a tile roof in a traditional Bosnian style. After the mayor rebuilt Visoko, it had a unique mix of oriental and Western styles. Some houses from this time period still stand in the old district of the town.

=== Kingdom of Yugoslavia, NDH and WWII (1918–1945) ===
After World War I and the defeat of Austria-Hungary in 1918, Visoko was incorporated into the new Kingdom of Yugoslavia. In the new state, the structure of houses did not change nor did the town develop. At the outbreak of the Second World War, Visoko was included in the newly formed Nazi Germany-sponsored Independent State of Croatia. Allied bombers pursued German and NDH forces and dropped nine bombs in the Visoko area, destroying strategic targets. Throughout the war, the town was not a battlefront and did not suffer much damage from the war itself. However, of the 1205 soldiers from the Visoko area, 142 of them were killed during the war. Visoko was liberated on 7 April 1945 by the 7th, 9th and 17th Krajina brigades from the Tenth division of the forces of the Yugoslav Partisans.

=== SFR Yugoslavia (1945–1992) ===
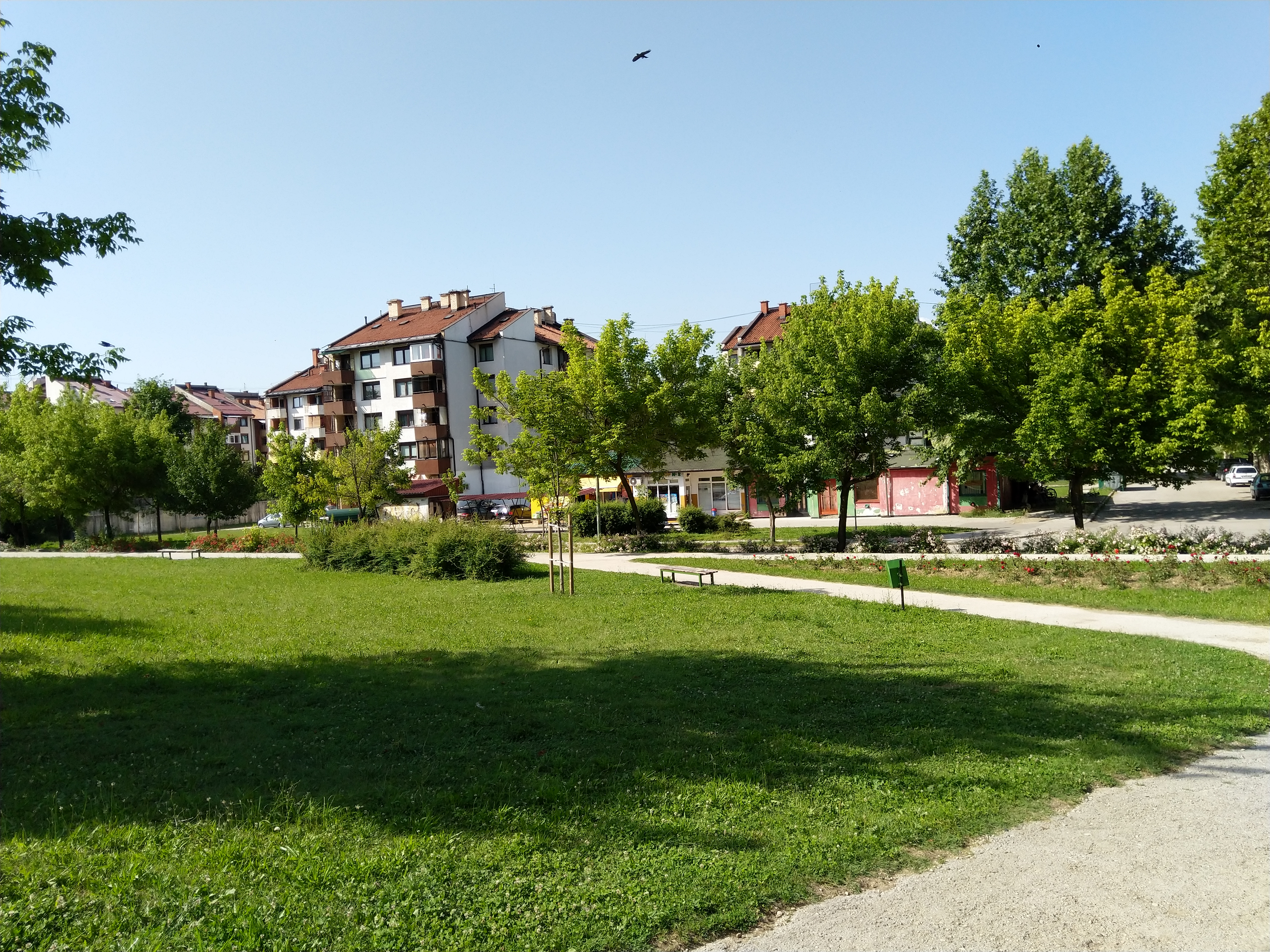
Urban settlement Luke in Visoko, most densely populated part of the city.

After World War II, Visoko, like many other towns in Bosnia, began industrialisation and further urban expansion. From 1950, the town expanded to the extensive lowlands along Bosna and Fojnica shores, which were mostly used as farms. For ages, Visoko was known for its quality leather industry and with new age of industrialisation, the biggest leather company in Yugoslavia, KTK, had its headquarters in Visoko. Besides the leather industry, Visoko was distinctive for its textile, trade, metal and food industries, making the town one of the largest exporters in Socialist Yugoslavia. By 1991, Visoko had 92,5 million dollars of exported good, with 80 million of that from KTK's leather industry. Due to the economic success of Visoko, Yugoslav president Josip Broz Tito came to Visoko to visit the factories and the town itself.

During this period, the town developed necessary institutions like a post office, police and fire stations, health care, hotels, supermarkets, sport stadiums, and halls. Culture bloomed with the founding of a theatre, museum, cinema and library. Education was also improved by building three new schools: a primary Safvet-beg Bašagić, two high schools with a gymnasium and mixed high school center, Hazim Šabanović. In 1983 Zlatko Ugljen received Aga Khan Award for Architecture for Šerefudin's White Mosque. The late 1980s and early 1990s were years of hasty urbanization and building of whole settlements like Luke which represents the most densely populated area of Visoko.

In 1953, Visoko's handball club, RK Bosna, (previously Vitex) was founded and eventually competed in the first Yugoslavia handball league. A football club called Bosna was created in 1953 by merging two existing clubs Jadran (founded 1923) and Radnički (founded 1934). Aero club Izet Kurtalić is also one of the successful clubs which won numerous gold and other medals in Yugoslavia.

=== Bosnian War (1992–1995) ===
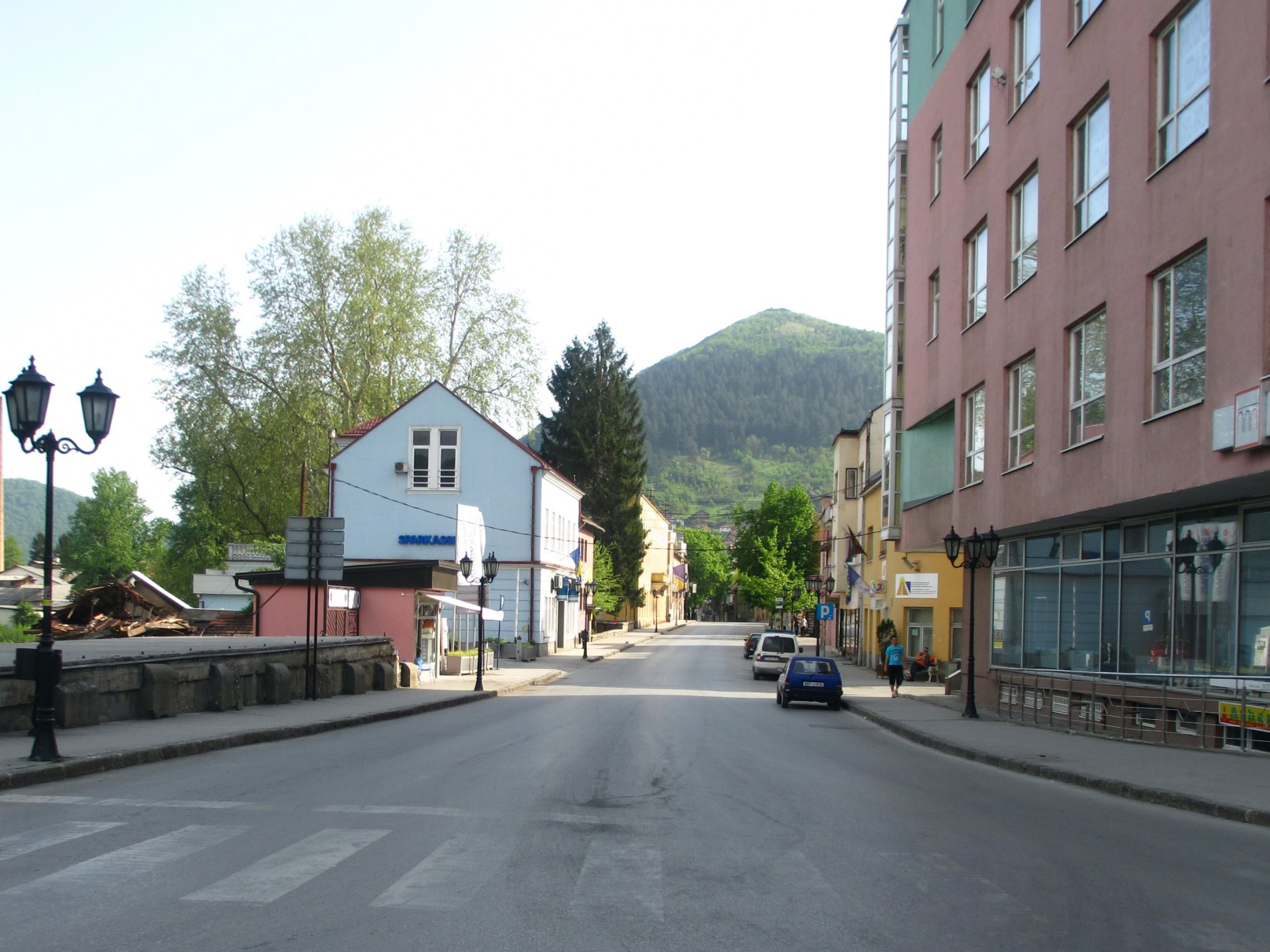
Street in Visoko.

On 6 April 1992, a state of emergency was proclaimed, with local Serbs already armed and surrounding the town. Local residents began to arm themselves or were armed by the Bosniak SDA party. The quick reaction of the local population prevented the town's capture by seizing two local JNA barracks finally on 26 April, where newly formed local TO (territory defence) forces captured most of the arms in the barracks, which was a turning point at the start of the war in the Visoko area.

The end of January embarked conflict between the Bosnian Croat HVO and Army of Bosnia & Herzegovina (which succeed TO). On 27 January Visoko and neighbouring units prevented the blockade of Fojnica. On 2 November ARBiH units captured nearby HVO-held Vareš. The last days of 1994 brought a ceasefire between HVO and ARBiH, forming a united Federation and begin concentrating the fight on the much better-armed VRS (Army of Republika Srpska).

On 15 June Visoko was center of preparations for breaking the blockage on nearby Sarajevo. The action was however executed but with no significant gains, only some portion of the territory was liberated but Sarajevo stayed besieged. This big manoeuvre helped ARBiH forces outside Sarajevo to capture whole several towns and villages.

Finally, the Dayton Agreement removed all front lines who were all 4 years dangerously close to town itself but never changed considerably, and only changes were made by Visoko's forces by capturing nearby Zimča and other minor hills which only prevented town being surrounded. Visoko itself was heavily damaged; especially, economic resources and factories were purposely hit, damaged and destroyed. The damage to the economy was about $200 million. For four years of war Visoko area units lost 297 soldiers, 600 were wounded and disabled. 23 soldiers from Visoko area got highest ranking in ARBiH Zlatni Ljiljan (Golden Lily), and 19 members of police got Golden Police Star. Civilians also suffered, many of them wounded or killed, although, throughout the whole war, Visoko served as a center for refugees across Bosnia and Herzegovina, as it was considered well defended by their units, thus Visoko was a logistical center of Army BiH because it had industrial capacity and an improvised aerodrome.

=== Bosnian pyramids claims ===
Visočica is a hill overlooking the town of Visoko. In October 2005, Bosnian native and author Semir Osmanagić claimed that this hill and several surrounding hills concealed pyramids.

Scientific investigations of the site show there is no pyramid. Additionally, scientists have criticised the Bosnian authorities for supporting the pyramid claim saying, "This scheme is a cruel hoax on an unsuspecting public and has no place in the world of genuine science."

Bosnian archaeologists have asked that the government cancel the digging permits given to Osmanagić and concentrate on work on the medieval town.

== Economy ==
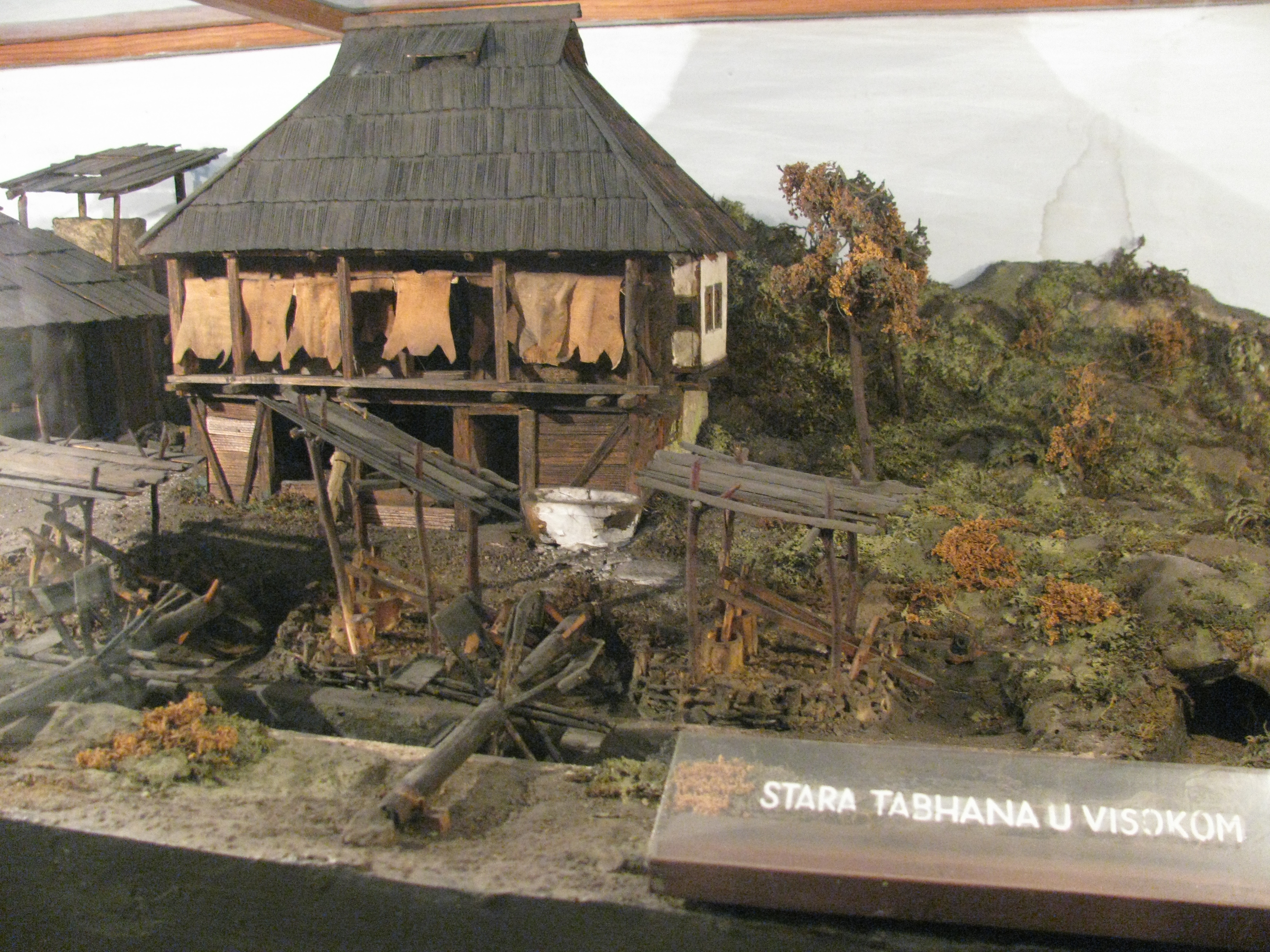
Traditional Bosnian facility for processing leather

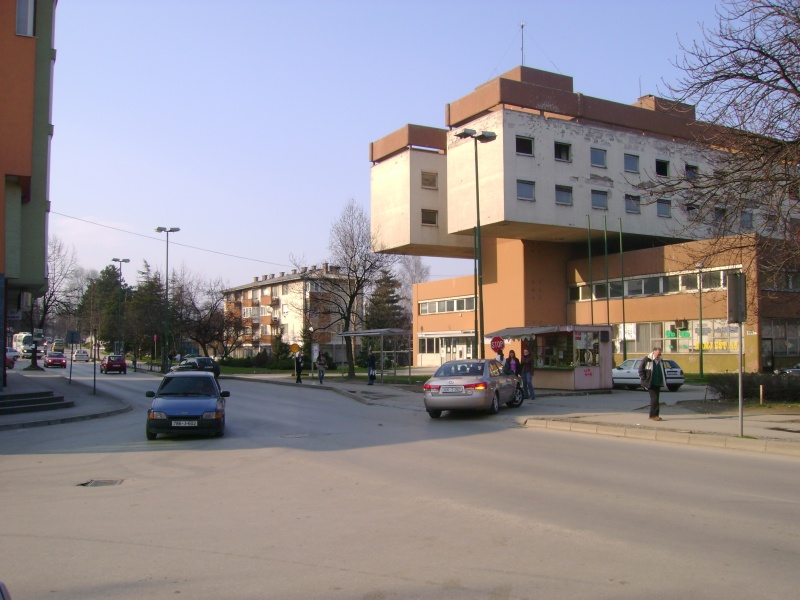
The building on the right side of the picture was the former center of the company Velepromet from the time of Socialist Yugoslavia

Visoko, experienced intensive modernization during the socialist era until 1991 with industrial exports accounting for a significant proportion of the town's economic activity.

Bosnian War left much of industry destroyed where damages are estimated at around 400 million KM (Convertible mark). Still, even the heavy bombardment by artillery and aircraft didn't stop Visoko's industry from producing goods for the army and civil population of Visoko and area.

The key drivers of economic development in the municipality include companies operating in the production of leather and leather goods, the manufacturing, packaging, and processing of food products, textile and clothing production, construction materials manufacturing, as well as the metalworking and wood-processing industries. The majority of enterprises within these sectors are export-oriented.

Food industry Vispak received Guinness certificate on 29 July 2005 for making largest coffee pot in the world. Visoko is traditionally known for its dried meat products like sujuk, and was made at least from the 1750s. Best known product is Visočka pečenica. Association of meat processors geographically protected Visočka pečenica as a brand on 5 June 2020.

=== Tourism ===
Tourism in Visoko has seen steady growth since the mid-2000s because of Semir Osmanagić discredited Bosnian pyramid claims.

== Education ==
There is limited detailed information about medieval universities in the Visoko area, or in the place called Bosnia, as it was referred to in one of the Vatican archives. The first recorded mention of a university in the region dates to 1175, referring to a high academy operated by the Bosnian religious organization (see Bosnian Church). This institution was noted for its scholarship in medicine, theology, cosmogeny, and ethics. Four documents—directly or indirectly—attest to the existence of this high academy in the Visoko area.

Modern education began with the introduction of a Rüşdiye, an Ottoman school equivalent to European high schools of the time, built in 1870 and closed following the Austro-Hungarian annexation in 1879. Around 1881, the new authorities established Municipal schools, where classes were held in private houses. In 1910, the first purpose-built school was constructed by the Austro-Hungarian administration; the building still stands today. In 1900, a Franciscan gymnasium was relocated from Guča Gora to Visoko. As the leather industry became a key part of Visoko’s economy, a specialized Leather School was established in 1929.

== Society and culture ==
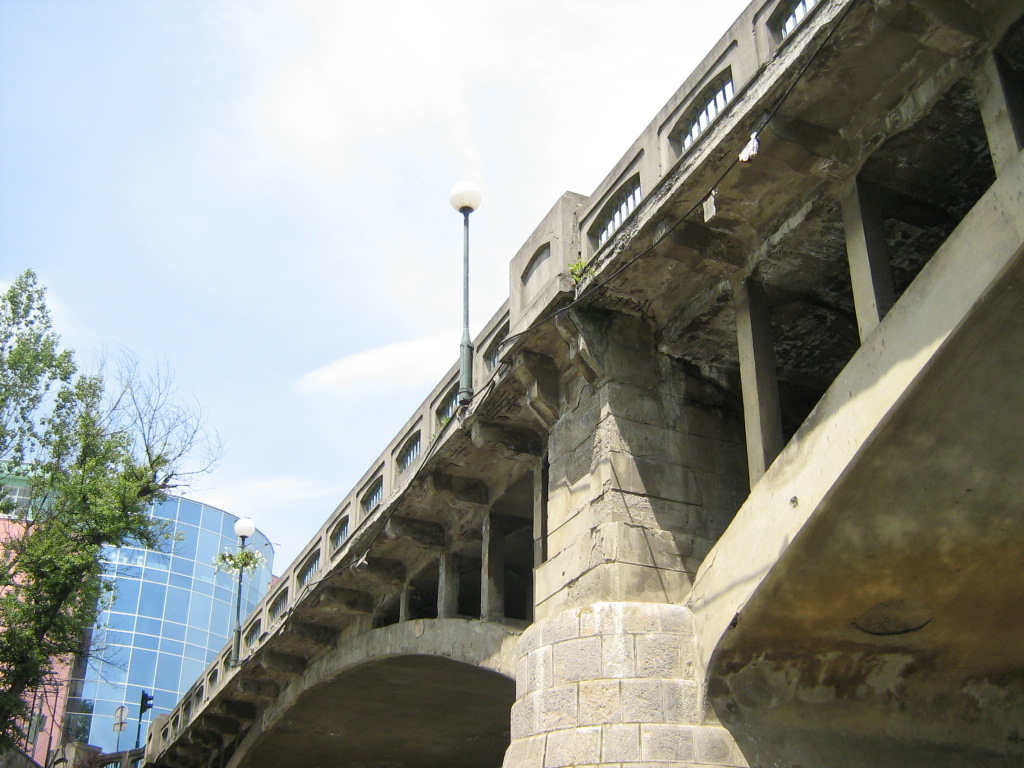
Concrete bridge built in 1928.

=== National monuments and architecture ===
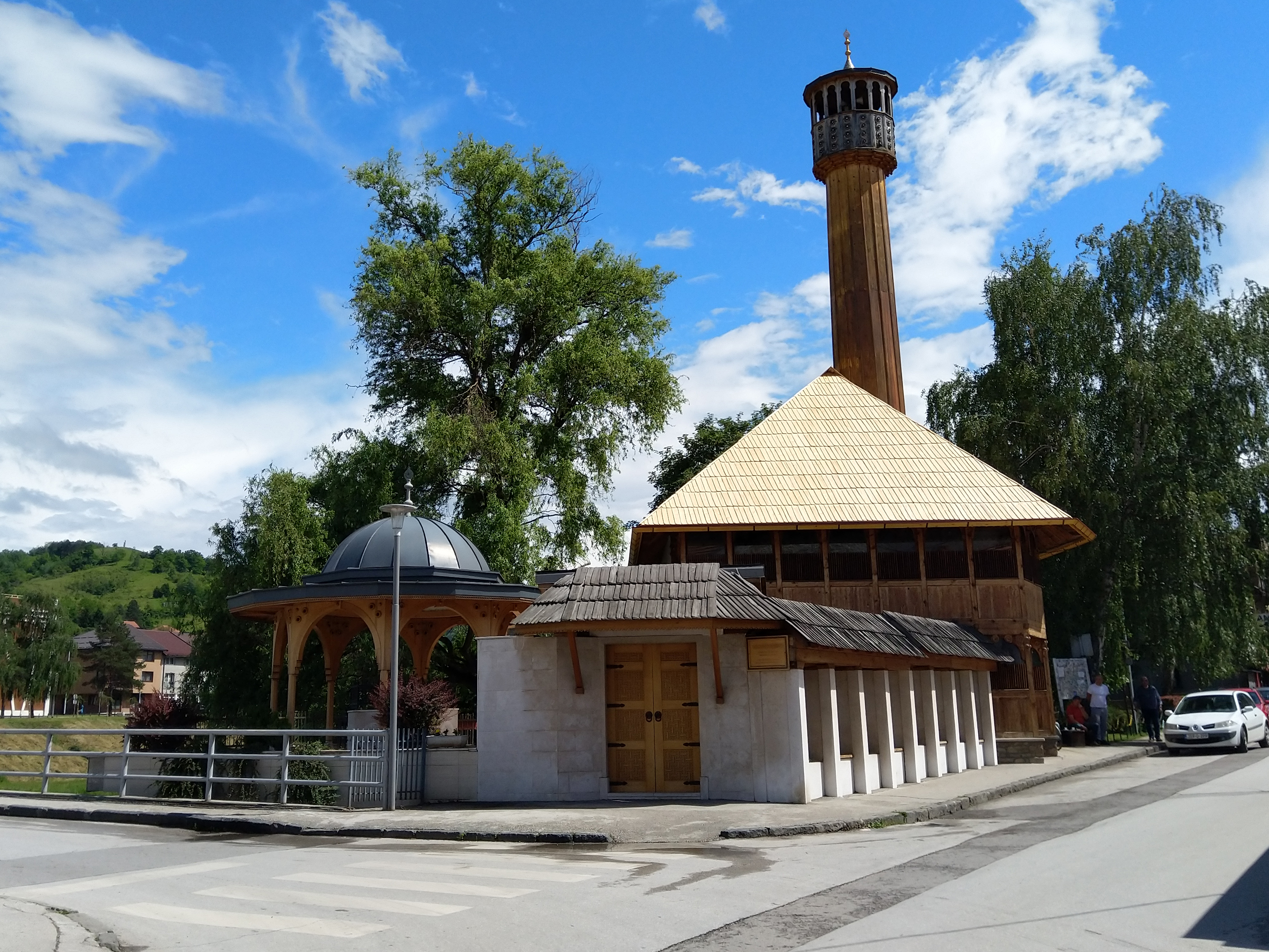
Tabačka (Tabačica) mosque in Visoko, Bosnia, national monument of Bosnia and Herzegovina

There are 6 National Monuments of Bosnia and Herzegovina in Visoko:

- Mile, place of gathering of medieval Bosnian nobility, and was one of the places where Stanak was held.
- Neolithic settlement in Okolište, biggest Butmir culture site.
- Old town of Visoki, fortress above today's Visoko.
- The architectural ensemble of the Orthodox Church of St Procopius of Scythopolis.
- Franciscan monastery of Saint Bonaventure.
- The architectural ensemble of the Tabačka (Tabačica) mosque in Visoko.

Šerefudin's White Mosque is of great architectural importance to the city and area. The mosque's architect was Zlatko Ugljen. Its most notable award came in 1983, when it received the Aga Khan Award for Architecture.

=== Museums ===
In Visoko there is a homeland museum which exhibits the cultural and historic heritage of the Visoko area, and Bosnia. Most of the exhibits are related to the medieval Bosnian state, because the Visoko valley was notable political and economical centre for Bosnian kings. In Goduša there is an extension of the museum where there are antique works of old Goduša's crafts, which are mostly woodcarving.

=== Health ===
Visoko has a health centre with polyclinic which was built in 1953. In 2006 polyclinic was modernized with modern laboratory and computer equipment. The health centre operates in coordination with the Cantonal Hospital in Zenica for secondary and tertiary healthcare. Pharmacies, smaller private practices, and dental offices also complement the municipal health network. In August 2024, Zenica-Doboj Canton ministry approved the conceptual design for the new building dedicated to urgent medical services at the Visoko Health Centre.

=== Music ===
In nearby Mulići there is Sevdah Institute of Omer Pobrić, whose mission is to preserve Bosniak music, tradition, and sevdalinka.

=== Sport ===
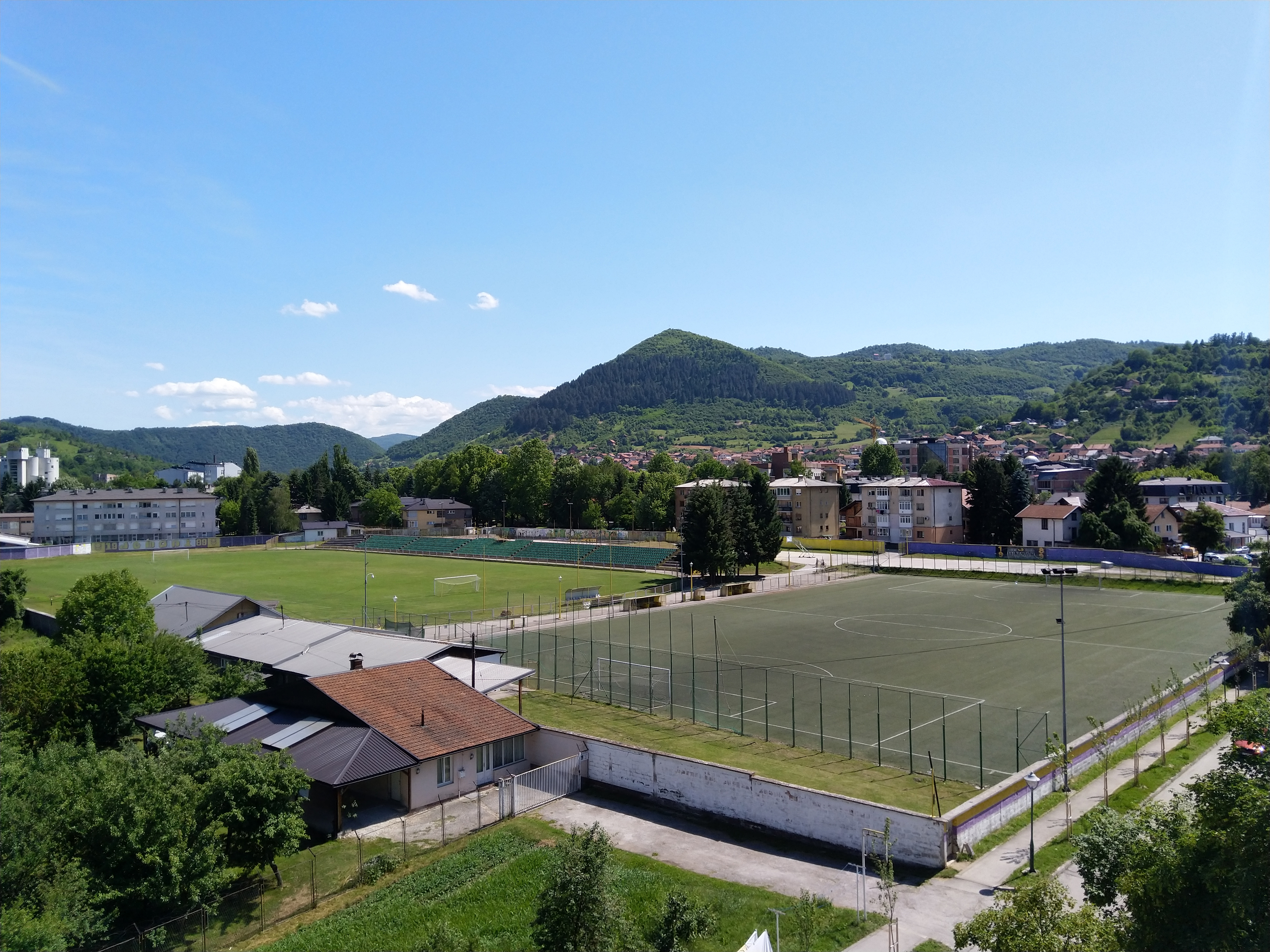
Stadium Luke, home of NK Bosna Visoko, winner of the Bosnia and Herzegovina Football Cup in 1999.

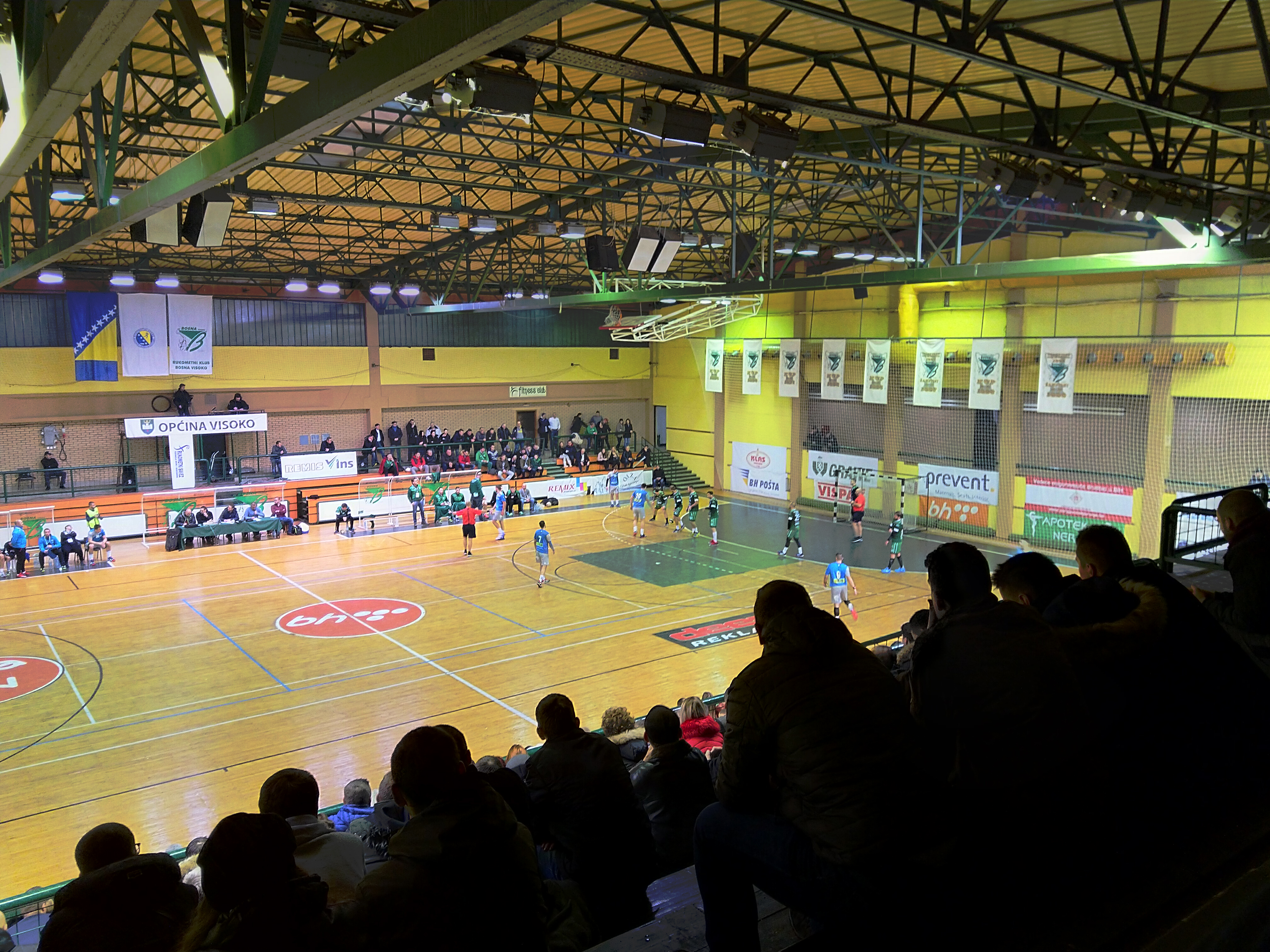
RK Bosna Visoko playing at their home Mladost hall. Handball is the most popular sport in Visoko.

Organized sports began to emerge with the opening of confessional and state schools. In 1909, the Soko society was formed and supported many sports activities. The building of the sports center on 16 June 1934 let developing men and women play volleyball, football, and later handball. Handball club RK Bosna Visoko has won Handball Championship of Bosnia and Herzegovina in 1997 and 1999, and Handball Cup of Bosnia and Herzegovina in 1998 and 2001. In season 1999–2000 they achieved their best international result, losing 48–44 in Eight-finals of EHF Cup, to eventual champions RK Metković Jumbo.

Football club NK Bosna Visoko was the winner of the Bosnia and Herzegovina Football Cup and the Supercup of Bosnia and Herzegovina in 1999. In Yugoslavia, the club managed to enter the Second League in 1963. Aero club "Izet Kurtalić", formed in 1960, was the most successful team in the country, winning numerous domestic and international events.

From 28 February to 2 March 2008 Visoko's hall Mladost was host of Group 2 qualifiers for 2008 FIFA Futsal World Cup in Brazil.

| Club | Leagues | Venue | Established |
|---|---|---|---|
| RK Bosna Visoko | Premier handball league | Hall "Mladost" | 1953 |
| NK Bosna Visoko | Second League of the Federation of Bosnia and Herzegovina | Luke Stadium | 1923 (Jadran), 1934 (Radnički); Merged in 1953 |

== Notable people ==
- Adnan Mević, officially the 6 billionth person born, according to the United Nations
- Ajas-pasha, Bosniak Ottoman sanjak-bey
- Matrakçı Nasuh, 16th-century Bosniak Ottoman mathematician and miniaturist
- Hazim Šabanović, historian
- Mustafa Cerić, Grand Mufti of Bosnia and Herzegovina (1993 to 2012)
- Zaim Muzaferija, actor
- Slaviša Vukićević, football player
- Haris Mujezinović, basketball player
- Elvedina Muzaferija, alpine skier
- Enes Begović, singer-songwriter
- Ognjen Prica (1899–1941), National Hero of Yugoslavia and leftist politician spent his childhood in the town (1900–1912)

== Twin towns – sister cities ==
Visoko is twinned with:

- Altındağ, Turkey
- Bjelovar, Croatia
- Kartal, Turkey

== See also ==
- Old town Visoki

== Sources ==
- Strategija razvoja općine Visoko
- Ćošković, Pejo (2009), Kotromanići (in Croatian), Leksikografski zavod Miroslav Krleža
- Anđelić, Pavao (1984), Doba stare bosanske države, Visoko i okolina kroz historiju 1, Visoko 1984, 101-309, lat. (in Serbo-Croatian), Skupština Općine Visoko, ISBN 978-9926-8494-2-9
- Filipović, Milenko S. (2002), Visočka nahija (in Serbian), Mak, ISBN 9789958977701
- Vego, Marko (1982), Postanak srednjovjekovne bosanske države (in Serbo-Croatian), Svjetlost
- Anđelić, Pavao (1973), "Bobovac i Kraljeva Sutjeska, Sarajevo", Informatica Museologica (in Serbo-Croatian), 6 (29): 8–0
- Kujundžić-Vejzagić, Muller; Rassmann, Schuler (2004), Okolište – iskopavanje i geofizička prospekcija centralnobosanskog tel-naselja iz prve polovine petog milenija prije n.e (in Bosnian), Centar za balkanološka ispitivanja, ANUBiH, Sarajevo
- Kreševljaković, Hamdija (1934), Visoko (in Bosnian)
