= Visoko during the Middle Ages =

Medieval history of Visoko

Expansion of the Bosnian state

The area of today's Visoko is considered to be a nucleus from where Bosnian statehood was developed in the 10th century. The expanded valley of the river Bosna around today's Visoko was the biggest agriculture area in central Bosnia, so fertile ground around Visoko was ideal for development of early political center of Bosnian nobility.

The settlement that was in Visoko field has been associated with the name Bosna (Bosnia) for a long time, only since the 1350s has the name Visoki became widely used. Visoko and its valley with Mile, Moštre and Podvisoki was an early center of the Bosnian medieval state, and the site where some members of the Kotromanić dynasty were buried and the first Bosnian King Tvrtko I was crowned. The old town of Visoki, located on Visočica hill, was a politically important fortress, and its inner bailey, Podvisoki, was an early example of a Bosnian medieval urban area.

== History ==
=== Medieval settlement Bosnia ===
Pavao Anđelić considers Visoko field to be the core from where early Slavs in the 7th and 8th century expanded the term Bosnia as a territorial unit.

The place known as Bosnia is mentioned in 17 medieval sources. A number of documents in Latin mention Bosnia in the context of a settlement. Stephen II Kotromanić, Ban of Bosnia, wrote a charter in 1334 in Bossina in curia nostra. Ragusans wrote in 1367 about the location of St. Nikola church as conventus sancti Nicolae de Bosna.

With times Visoki became a prevalent name for the medieval area that was known simply as Bosna (Bosnia). Names for Visoko varied in literature: Vizoka, Uisochi, Vissokium, Vissochi, Visuki, Visochium.

=== Bosnian banate ===
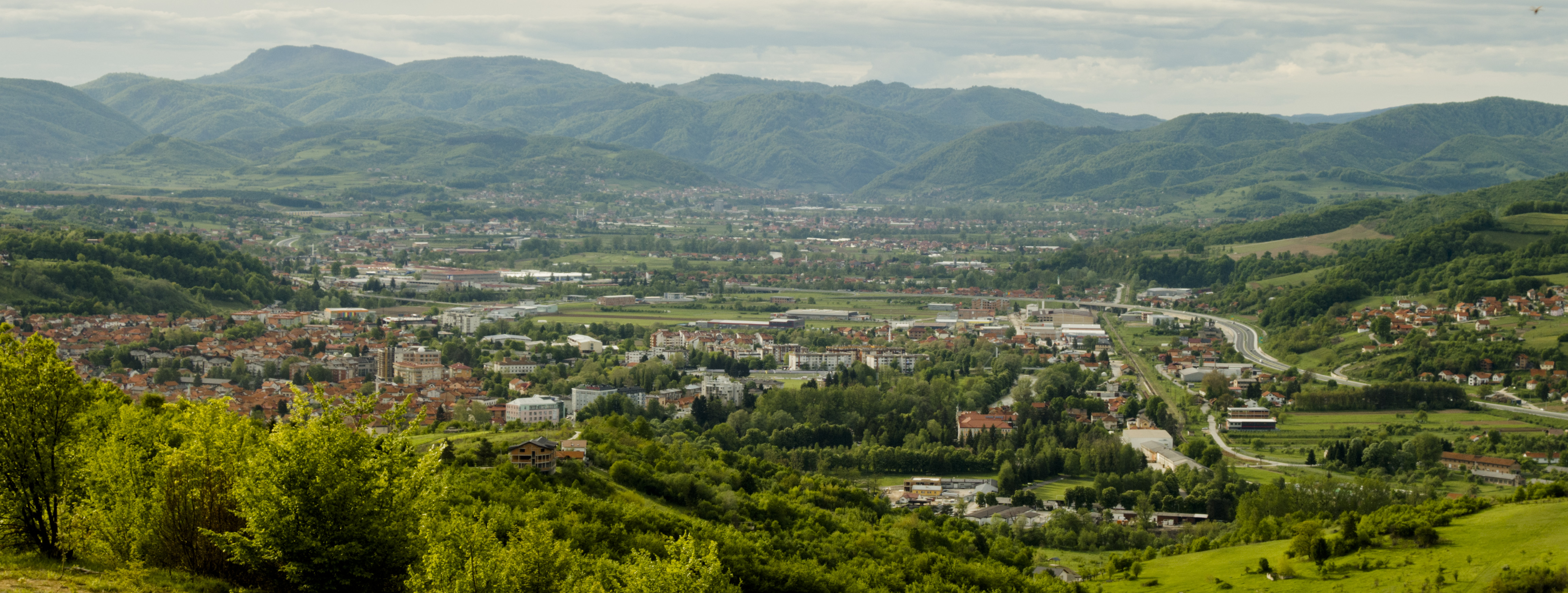
Look at Visoko valley from Vrela

Bosnia had become a banate by 1154. The first domestic ruler was Ban Kulin. His plate was found in Biskupići (which is derived from biskup, meaning bishop), a small place just outside of Visoko. The plate was once part of a church built by Kulin. According to Pavao Anđelić and others the Bilino Polje abjuration took place in Visoko valley, instead of the field of Bilino near Zenica, as there are no records of significant settlement there. Additionally Latin sources do not indicate where exactly this meeting took place, other than: by river, and that monastery is located beside town Bosna.

The medieval settlement of Bosna (civitas Bosna) is mentioned in documents from the 12th century. Mile is mentioned in 1244 as a place where Stephen II Kotromanić built a Franciscan monastery in honour of Saint Nicholas. After the death of Stephen II, he was succeeded by young ban Tvrtko, who would become the first king of Bosnia as Tvrtko I. His mother Jelena Šubić played an important role during his early reign. She went to the Kingdom of Hungary in 1354 and asked king Louis I of Hungary for confirmation of Tvrtko's rule in Bosnia. She held a stanak (assembly of nobility) in Mile, asking noblemen to confirm all of Tvrtko's rights, who was 15 years old by that time. Old town of Visoki on Visočica hill is first mentioned in a charter that was issued on 1 September 1355, where Tvrtko I confirmed Ragusans benefits and freedom in trade, which has been customary since the time of Kulin (see Charter of Ban Kulin). Podvisoki is mentioned in 1363, but its glory days were during the Kingdom of Bosnia.

=== Bosnian kingdom ===
The coronation of Tvrtko I Kotromanić was held on 26 October 1377 in the Church of St. Nicholaus in Mile. The Bosnian banate transformed into a kingdom. The fact this coronoation took place around Visoko has been proven archaeologically. Tvrtko Kotromanić wrote to Hrvoje Vukčić Hrvatinić on 12 March 1380 out from the royal court in Moštre (Moištri in medieval sources), which was also located in the Visoko basin.

==== Political and trading center of Bosnia ====
The center of trade for the Bosnian kingdom was Podvisoki, which had a considerable colony of Ragusan merchants. From 1404 to 1428, Podvisoki was a frequent caravan destination. Milaš Radomirić was a prominent merchant from Visoko, later accepted as a citizen of the Ragusan Republic. On April 9 1428 the wedding engagement between Tvrtko II and Dorothy Garai was made and by July 31 Ragusan merchants asked the queen to stop by Podvisoki so she could receive gifts. The biggest caravan shipment was recorded in 1428. On August 9 Vlachs committed to Ragusan lord Tomo Bunić, that they will deliver 1500 modius of salt carried by 600 horses. Mile was one of the places where Bosnian nobility and kings held stanak.

==== Struggle for power ====
Ostoja of Bosnia was one of the most active kings to leave traces in Visoko. He assumed his role as a king in 1398, but after 4 years he was forced to flee Bosnia. The nobility on the side of Tvrtko II held a meeting in Mile and decided to overthrow Ostoja because of his pro-Hungarian stance. Ostoja had lost the support of almost the whole nobility at the time. A difficult and very long stanak was held on June 5 1404. Hungarians decided to send an army into Bosnia, and Podvisoki was looted on March 4 1410. They even captured some Ragusan merchants stationed in Podvisoki, for which the Republic of Ragusa protested Sigismund, King of Hungary In 1412 Vuk Kotromanić, nephew of king Ostoja, killed and stole silver from one Ragusan merchant called Jakša Bunić. Ragusans demanded that Vuk be punished for his crime, but there is no evidence that he was ever prosecuted. Despite the hungarian incursion, king Ostoja remained in power and Tvrtko II went into hiding.

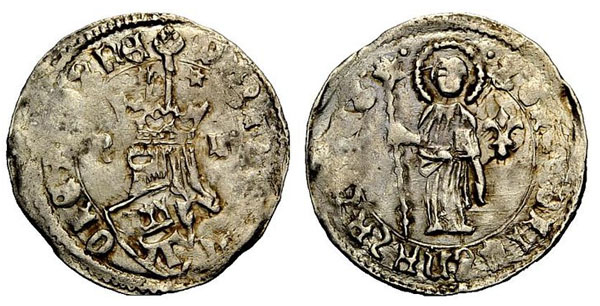
Money of king Tvrtko II. He was chosen as new king in 1404 at meeting in Mile, Visoko

King Ostoja died in 1418, which reignited unrest in the kingdom and eventually escalated into a civil war. Nobility once again didn't approve of the king, this time the son of Ostoja, Stephen Ostojić. He only had a handful of noblemen behind him, namely Petar Pavlović and Radosav Vladimirić. Stephen Ostojić ruled until June 5, 1420, when a meeting of the nobility in Visoko sealed his fate. The crucial event for Ostojić's demise was reconciliation between Radosav Pavlović and Duke Sandalj Hranić.

Tvrtko II reappeared around this time and he acquired the support of the Bosnian nobility in Visoko, including voivod Vukmir, mayor Dragiša, knez Juraj Vojsalić, knez Pribić, knez Radič Radojević of Pribinić-Radojević noble family, knez Batić Mirković, knez Juraj Dragičević, knez Petar Klešić, voivod Ivko and voivod Pavao Jurjević. Earlier that year the same nobility had supported Ostojić in one meeting that was held at the start of 1420, but this time Tvrtko II was assisted by the Ottoman Empire in reclaiming his throne and made Visoko his royal court in 1421.

A meeting was held in Visoko with representatives of the Republic of Venice, where they were granted trade freedoms, recorded in a charter issued on December 21, 1422 also in Visoko. Ishak Bey retreated with his forces and Tvrtko became undisputed king. By 1432 a new pretender to the throne emerged, namely Radivoj Ostojić, illegitimate son of king Ostoja. Tvrtko II by this time had lost the support of the Bosnian nobility and once again the Hungarians entered the scene, this time supporting Tvrtko II and reestablishing his power as king. From this point on, Visoko began to lose its importance. The Ottoman Empire was becoming a real threat to the Kingdom of Bosnia and the Visoko valley soon became part of the Ottoman frontier.

=== Fall of the Kingdom ===
Ottoman Empire by 1451 had a stronghold in Vrhbosna (today's Sarajevo) and Visoko was not safe anymore. Economic activity in Podvisoki faded and the king together with the nobility went into the north-east, where they retreated into better fortified positions like Bobovac and Ključ.

In these twilight years of the Kingdom of Bosnia, Thomas of Bosnia, son of King Ostoja, began persecuting members of the Bosnian Church, which were considered heretics by the Catholic Church, as a means to ensure help from Catholic Europe against the ever-growing threat of the Ottoman Empire. It seemed to work, as for the first time the crown for a king in Bosnia would come from Rome itself and the crowning was scheduled to take place in Visoko. The banishment of followers of the Bosnian Church from the Visoko area, a historical stronghold of theirs, led to the destruction of the local Franciscan monastery in retaliation. It was rebuilt shortly after by Mihovil Ostojić (Ostoides). By 1462 Visoko became the center of the Ottoman territorial area, known as the Visoko nahiye. There are no records that Ottomans besieged the town of Visoki, before or after 1463. The town was abandoned before 1503, as it is not mentioned in the Turkish-Hungarian treaty from that year. In 1626 Đorđić mentioned Visoki among abandoned towns.

== Visoko valley and notable centers ==
=== Visoki ===
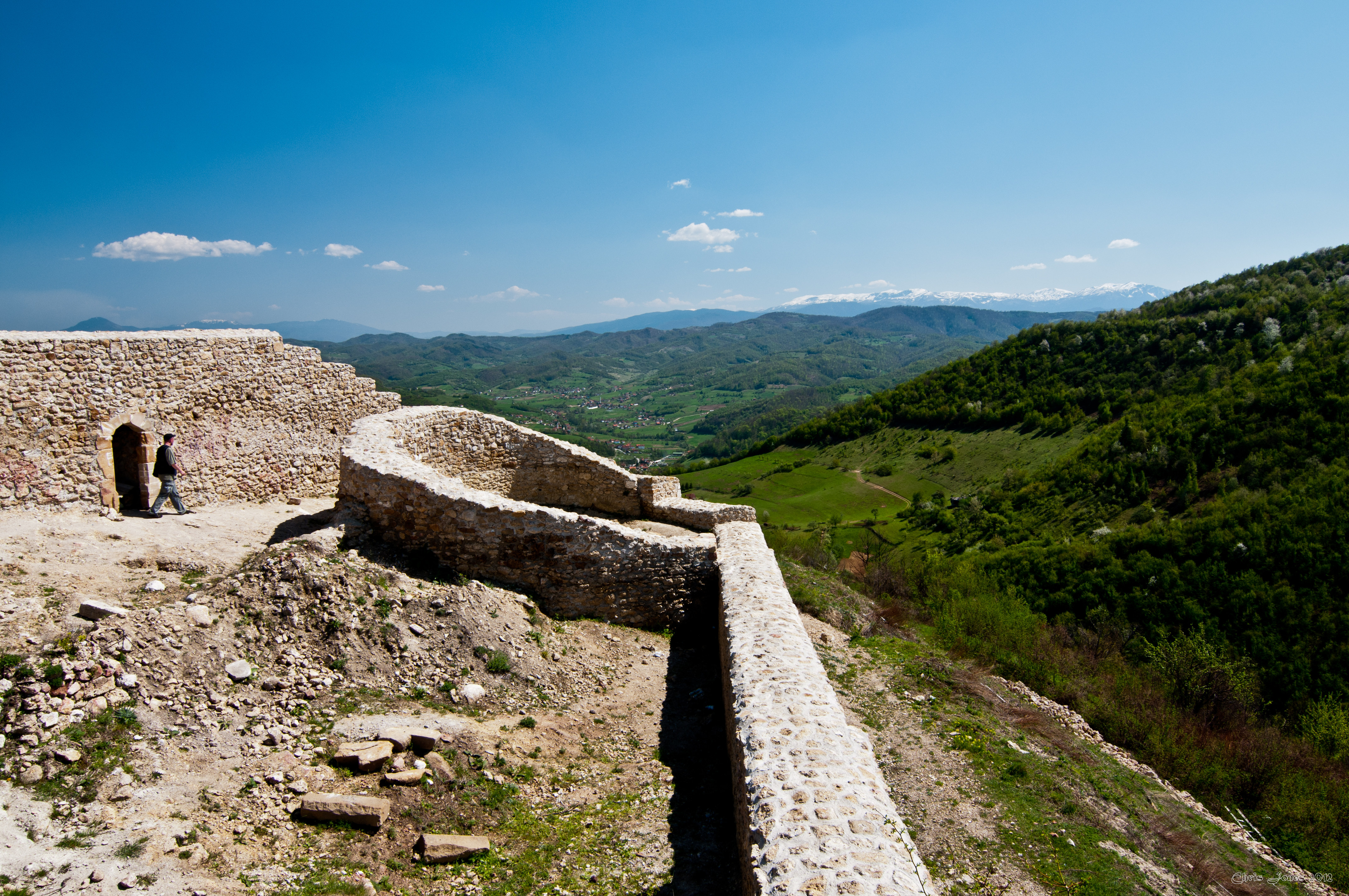
Remains of Old town of Visoki

The royal town of Visoki was a fortress which existed during the time of the medieval Bosnian state. The first mention of the town dates back to 1 September 1355, but it is believed to have been built even earlier. It was used by Bosnian bans and kings as a ruler's residence from which several official charters were written to other states. It was also defensively fortified, as the fortress had a trench and many towers of varying sizes. Visoki was first mentioned in a charter written in the royal town of Visoki, and was named in castro nosto Visoka vocatum. The charter was written by young ban, Tvrtko I of Bosnia, who later became king in 1377 by his coronation in Mile. Several other rulers and nobles wrote charters in Visoki, including King Stephen Ostoja of Bosnia and Tvrtko Borovinić, who would be the last to write of the old town of Visoki in 1436 in the document on Visoki.

Visoki was built on Visočica hill, at a height of 766 meters, and 300 meters above the valley where the modern town of Visoko is located. By the time of the Turkish conquest of Bosnia, the old town was probably destroyed and never reconstructed. Few remnants of old Visoki remain, most being preserved in the town's museum. In situ evidence includes the remains of foundations of the towers, walls and gates. A model has been reconstructed according to plans of Đoko Mazalić made in 1953. The old royal town of Visoki is a national monument of Bosnia and Herzegovina. Today, beginning from 2007 its ruins are being slowly excavated so the town is becoming visible more and more.

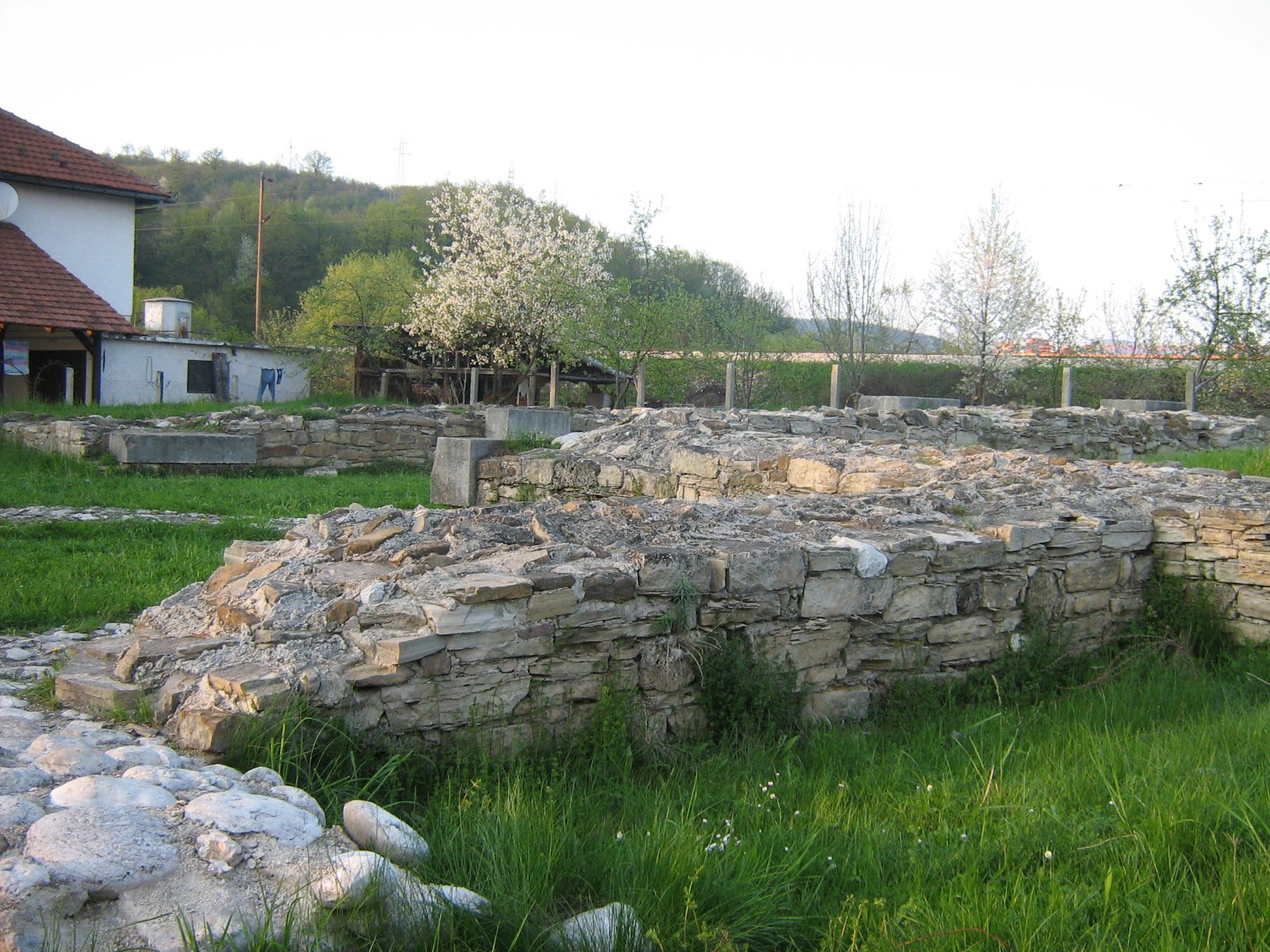
Remains of old church in Mile

=== Podvisoki ===
Podvisoki is a modern settlement in Visoko and was once a medieval subtown of the royal town. It was an important trade center and sometimes a ruler's residence. Podvisoki was one of the earliest examples of the medieval urban environments in Bosnia. In Podvisoki, a colony of Dubrovnik's merchants developed and maintained historically good relations with the Republic of Ragusa. The terms Bosnia and Podvisoki are often mentioned in Ragusan charters and documents, sometimes used interchangeably. Biggest caravan shipment in medieval Bosnia happened in 1428 between Podvisoki and Dubrovnik.

=== Mile ===
Mile was first recorded in 1244 as the home of the Church of Saints Cosmas and Damian, a possession of the Bosnian bishopric. Around 1340, a Franciscan vicarage was established in Mile, the Franciscan monastery in the town was the first in Bosnia. The monastery is located by the modern settlement of Arnautovići on the right bank of the river Bosna. Mile was the coronation and burial place of Bosnian bans and kings during the medieval Bosnian state and was also the site where the Rusag was held. The first king of Bosnia, Tvrtko I Kotromanić, was crowned in Mile in the Franciscan church of St. Nicholas, and later buried there alongside his uncle Stjepan II Kotromanić. An archive with important documents was also located in Mile.

Visoko's museum houses many artifacts found by archaeological excavations in the valley. One such expedition found a stećak necropolis, some made in fine detail, including many materials, jewellery, tools, and other artifacts.

=== Moštre ===
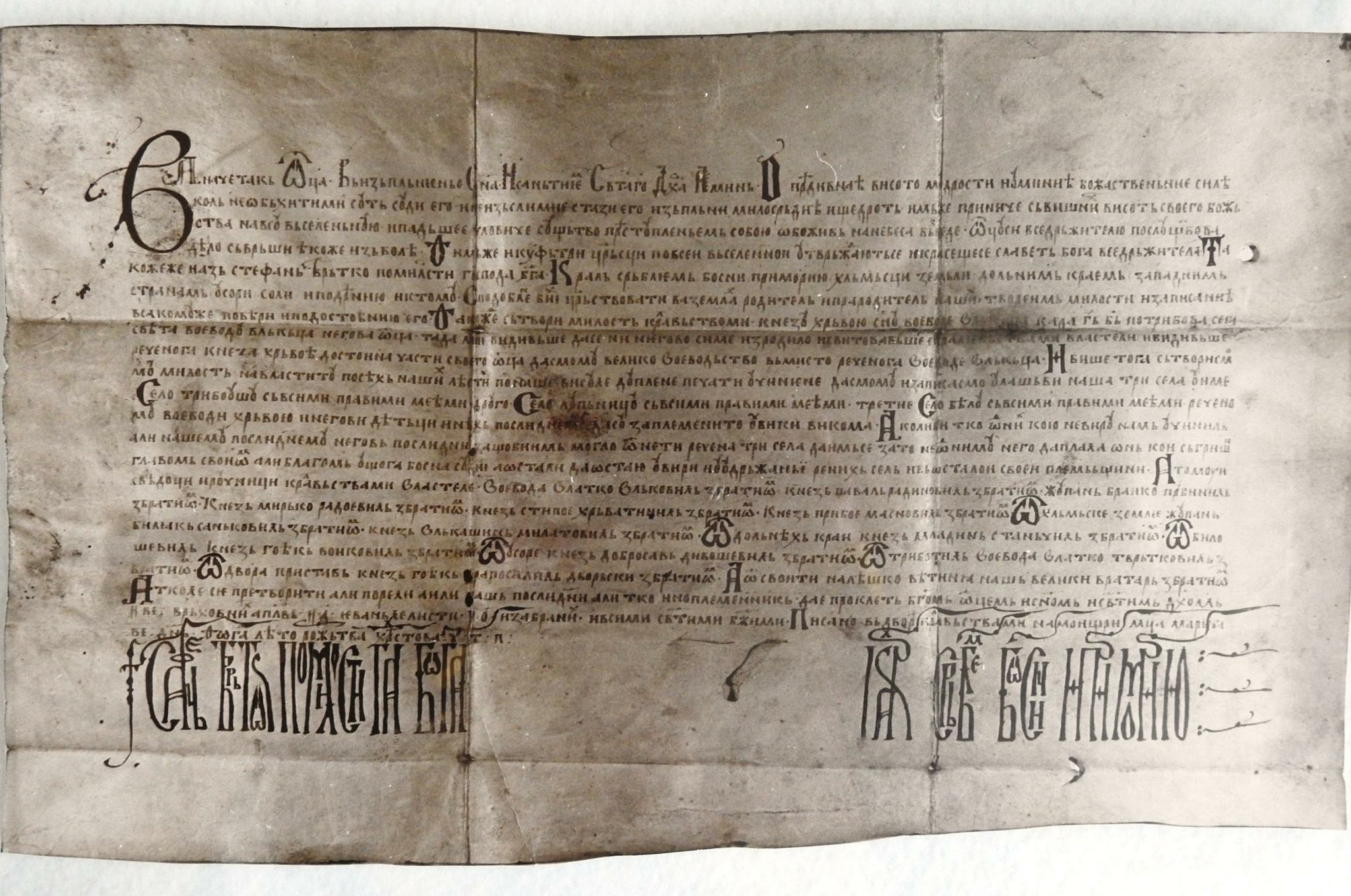
Charter of King Tvrtko I Kotromanić, written in Moštre

There is not much detailed information about the medieval university in the Visoko area, referred to as the place called Bosnia by the Vatican archives. The university at Moštre was first mentioned in 1175 as a high academy of Bosnian religious organization (see Bosnian Church). The university was known for its scholarship in medicine, theology, cosmogony, and ethics. There are four documents that directly or indirectly point to the existence of the high academy in the Visoko Area.

In addition to its university, Moštre was the location of Bosnian church institutions including the house of krstjani. Also, Moštre was a place where charters were sometimes written; for example, in 1323, when ban Stjepan published his charter to Duke Vukoslav, and later in 1381, when king Tvrtko I Kotromanić issued a charter to Hrvoje Vukčić.

=== Milodraž ===
Milodraž, first mentioned in a charter King Tvrtko II issued to the Republic of Ragusa on 18 August 1421, was a settlement not exactly situated within the Visoko valley, however an important neighboring center on an important road connecting Visoko with nearby Fojnica and Kreševo. Other royal charters in correspondence with the Ragusans documents confirm that one of the residences of Tvrtko II and King Thomas was located there.

The settlement's significance was augmented by two royal weddings which took place in it: the wedding of Tvrtko II with Dorothy Garai, in July 1428, and the wedding of Thomas with Katarina Kosača, in May 1446. It is, however, most notable as the place where Mehmed the Conqueror, following the Ottoman conquest of Bosnia in late May 1463, issued the Ahdname to the Bosna Argentina Franciscan friar Anđeo Zvizdović, promising religious tolerance.

Pobrđe Milodraž, the present-day village in Kiseljak, Bosnia and Herzegovina, is located in the same area as medieval Milodraž.

=== Other locations ===
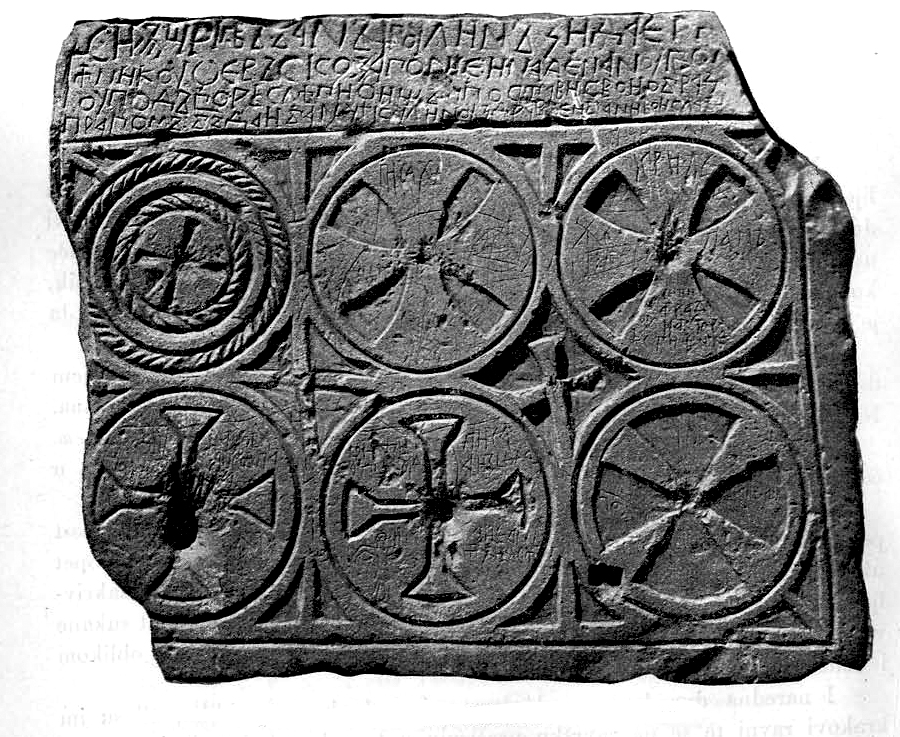
Kulin Ban's plate from 1193, found in Biskupići

In Biskupići, a plate of Kulin Ban dating from 1193 was found alongside the remains of his church, grave, and foundations of buildings from that period. Other notable medieval settlements in the vicinity included Sebinje town, Čajan town in Gračanica—which protected the roads between Visoko and Bobovac—and the towns of Bedem and Goduša.

In the small settlement of Malo Čajno, on the ground of an Orthodox church cemetery, a plate of big Kaznac Nespina was found. The stone slab depicts a relief scene of hunting with Romanesque stylistic characteristics. Its length is 210 cm, height 106 cm, and thickness is 7–10 cm. Cyrillic inscription reveals the title and name of the distinguished representative of the state administration whose task was to collect rulers revenues. Because of the carved relief there are indications that it is much older than the 13th century, as was originally believed, some experts dating it back to the 8th century.

== See also ==
- Old town of Visoki
- History of Bosnia and Herzegovina
  - Bosnia and Herzegovina in the Middle Ages
  - List of monarchs of Bosnia
- Bosnia (region)
- Bosnia (early medieval)

== Sources ==
- Desanka Kovačević-Kojić, Sarajevo (1978). Gradska naselja srednjovjekovne Bosanske države
- Bešlagić, Šefik (2004), Leksikon stećaka, Svjetlost, Biblioteka kulturno nasljeđe Bosne i Hercegovine, ISBN 9789958107511
- Mužić, Ivan (2008), Vjera Crkve bosanske, Muzej hrvatskih arheoloških spomenika
- Škegro, Ante (2005), Fenomen "Krstjani" u srednjovjekovnoj Bosni i Humu, Institut za istoriju u Sarajevu;Hrvatski institut za povijest, Zagreb, ISBN 978-9985-9642-5-5
- Runje, Petar (2001), Pokornički pokret i franjevci trećoredci glagoljaši, “Provincijalat franjevaca trećoredaca” - “Kršćanska sadašnjost”, Zagreb
- Brković, Milko (2002), Srednjovjekovna Bosna i Hum. Identitet i kontinuitet., “Crkva na kamenu”, Mostar
- Filipović, Milenko S. (2002), Visočka nahija, Mak, ISBN 9789958977701
- Anđelić, Pavao (1973), "Bobovac i Kraljeva Sutjeska, Sarajevo", Informatica Museologica, 6 (29): 8–0
- Anđelić, Pavao (1984), Doba stare bosanske države, Visoko i okolina kroz historiju 1, Visoko 1984, 101-309, lat., Skupština Općine Visoko, ISBN 978-9926-8494-2-9
- Anđelić, Pavao (1979), Krunidbena i grobna crkva bosanskih vladara u Milima (Arnautovićima) kod Visokog (in Serbo-Croatian)
- Vego, Marko (1982), Postanak srednjovjekovne bosanske države, Svjetlost
- Ćošković, Pejo (1996), Veliki knez bosanski Tvrtko Borovinić, Croatica Christiana Periodica XX/37, Zagreb
- Jelenić, Julian (1906), Kraljevsko Visoko i samostan sv. Nikole, Daniela A. Kajona, Sarajevo
