= Plješevica (disambiguation) =

Plješevica is a mountain in Croatia and at the border with Bosnia and Herzegovina, also known as Lička Plješivica.

Plješevica may also refer to:

- Plješevica hill near Visoko, one of the locations of the purported Bosnian pyramids
- Plješevica, Rogatica, a village near Rogatica, Bosnia and Herzegovina
