= Podvisoki =

Medieval and modern settlement in Visoko, Bosnia and Herzegovina

- pod gradom Visoki
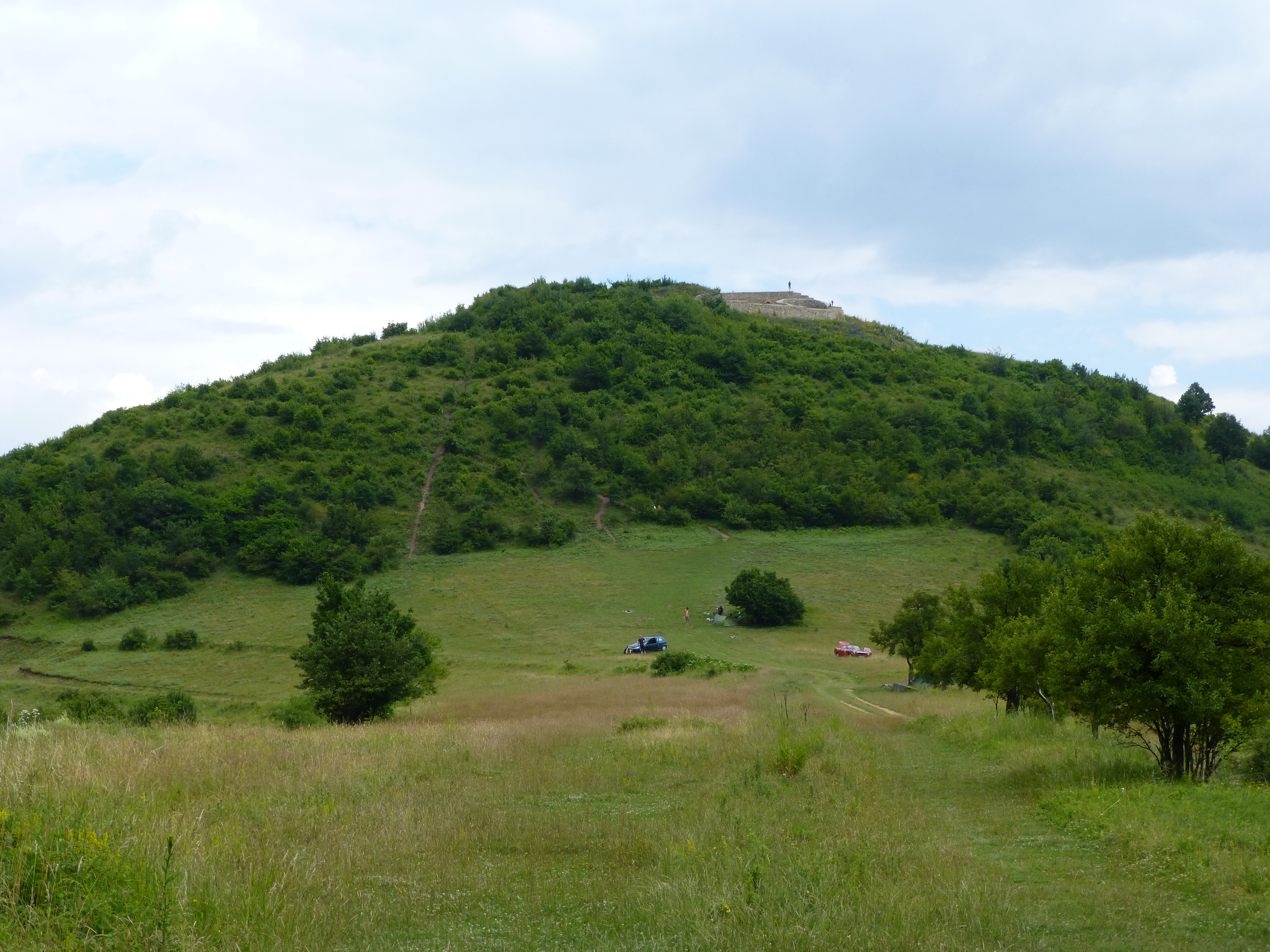
- Plateau where Podvisoki podgrađe once stood

- Location within Bosnia and Herzegovina
- 43°58′38″N 18°10′27″E
- Location: Visoko

History
- Formed: cca. 1402

Site notes
- Governing body: Commission to preserve national monuments of Bosnia and Herzegovina
- Owner: state

Podvisoki (Cyrillic: Подвисоки) was a medieval settlement, a castle town (in Serbo-Croatian: podgrađe, lit. 'under-town'), as part of wider area just beneath of the fortress Visoki, located on the Visočica hill above modern-day Visoko, Bosnia and Herzegovina.

== History ==
Podvisoki served as the primary trading center for much of the medieval history of the Bosnian state from the mid-14th century onwards. Its first recorded mention was in 1363. The town was situated along the Fojnica river, at the foothills of Visočica hill in the Bosnia region, and was considered one of the early examples of medieval urban settlements in the area.

Podvisoki was home to a colony of Ragusan merchants, who remained there until the 1430s when they moved to Fojnica. One notable local merchant from Visoko in the 14th century was Milaš Radomirić.

According to Ragusan sources, the biggest caravan trade between Podvisoki and Ragusa occurred in 1428. On August 9 of that year, Vlachs committed to delivering 1500 modius of salt with 600 horses to Ragusan lord Tomo Bunić. The delivery was meant for Dobrašin Veseoković, and the Vlachs' price was half of the delivered salt.

In the late 14th century, merchants from Podvisoki were involved in the slave trade. Historical records indicate that in November 1389, a man named Bogovac Vukojević (also known as Bogaueç Vochoeuich Bossinensis de Souisoch) traded a young Bosnian boy named Milko for 4 ducats.

== See also ==
- Visoko during the Middle Ages
- Old town of Visoki
- Mile, Visoko

== Literature ==
- Pavao Anđelić, Srednji vijek – Doba stare bosanske države, „Visoko i okolina kroz historiju I, Visoko 1984.
- Redžić, Husref (2009), Srednjovjekovni gradovi u Bosni i Hercegovini (in Bosnian), Sarajevo Publishing, ISBN 978-9958-21-511-7
