= Visočica =

Visočica may refer to:

- Visočica (hill), a hill in Bosnia and Herzegovina near Visoko
- Visočica (mountain), a mountain in Bosnia and Herzegovina near Konjic
- Visočica (river), a river in Bulgaria and Serbia
