= Osmanagić =

Osmanagić is a Bosnian surname. Notable people with the surname include:

- Amer Osmanagić (born 1989), Bosnian footballer
- Semir Osmanagić (born 1960), Bosnian businessman and author
