= Bosnian pyramid claims =

Pseudoarchaeology in Bosnia and Herzegovina

Coordinates: 43°58′37″N 18°10′34″E

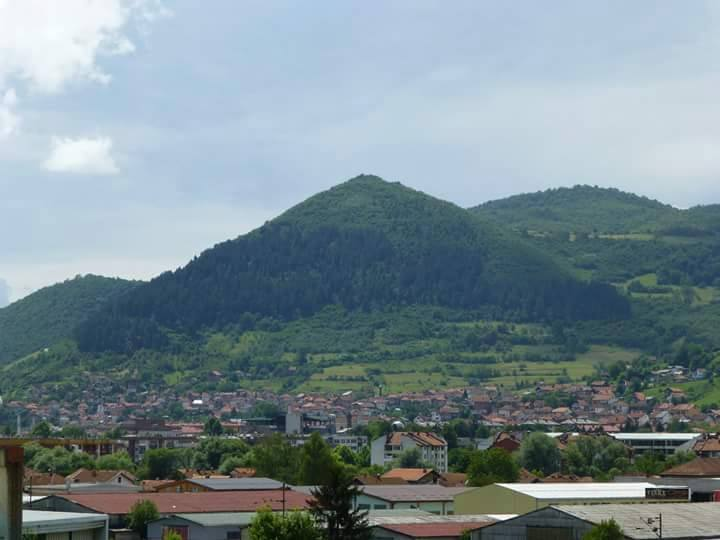
Visočica hill

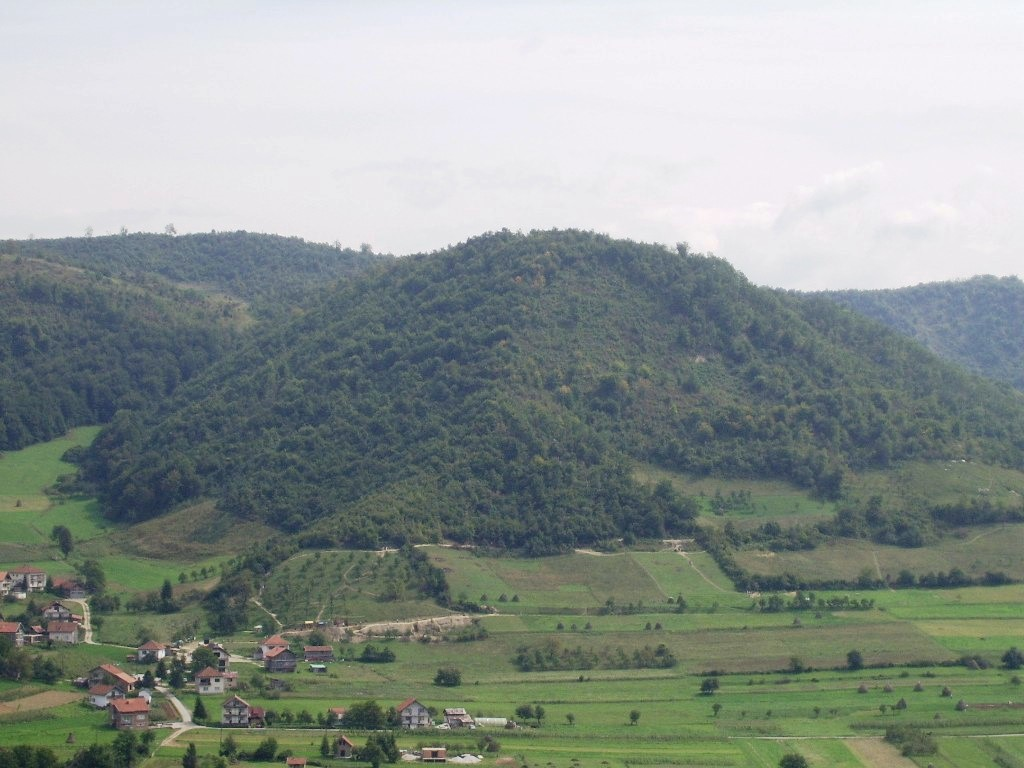
Plješevica hill

The Bosnian pyramid claims are pseudoarchaeological theories put forward to explain the formation of a cluster of natural hills in the area of Visoko in central Bosnia and Herzegovina. Since 2005, Semir Osmanagić, a Bosnian-American businessman based in Houston, Texas, has claimed that these hills are the largest human-made ancient pyramids on Earth. His claims have been overwhelmingly refuted by scientists but he has proceeded to promote the area as a tourist attraction.

Direct study of the site by geologists, archaeologists, and other scientists has demonstrated that the hills are natural formations known as flatirons, and that there is no evidence that they were shaped by human construction. The European Association of Archaeologists has condemned the so-called "Bosnian pyramids" as a "cruel hoax"; along with various other scholars they are also concerned about damage being done to genuine archaeological and paleontological sites: a medieval Bosnian castle, Roman fortifications, and other ancient remains. Osmanagić initiated excavations in 2006 and has since reshaped one of the hills, making it look like a stepped pyramid. The academic community has called for the government to end funding of excavations and disruption of the site because of the damage to true archaeological resources.

Many scholars have noted that the claims have been used for serious ideological, political and economic gains by various factions in Bosnia. Although Osmanagić's claims have been completely disproved by the scientific community, the Visoko area in recent years has attracted pseudoscience enthusiasts; the so-called Bosnian pyramids and the Ravne tunnels have been morphed into "New Age pilgrimage sites". By June 2016, Osmanagić had completed an "archaeological park" at one of the hills, where he attracts volunteers who are constructing botanical gardens; meditation sessions have been held at the site. It has been noted that tourist traffic has aided the economy of the city of Visoko; the city had been near the front of the early 1990s Bosnian War that destroyed much of the town's infrastructure and economy in the late 20th century. As of 2017, Osmanagić continued to make alterations to the hills and add to his marketing about them. His work at the time was largely privately funded.

== Osmanagić's claims ==
The hills are located near the town of Visoko, northwest of Sarajevo. The town was Bosnia's capital during the Middle Ages, and ruins of a medieval fortress are located atop Visočica hill. Given the defensive strategic value of hilltop locations, other civilizations built facilities at this site: the fortress was built over an old observation post of the Roman Empire, which, in turn, had been constructed on top of the ruins of a further more ancient settlement. The hills are a type known as flatirons. Archaeological geologist Paul Heinrich of Louisiana State University has said that such formations are common throughout the world, for example, the so-called "Russian Twin Pyramids" in Vladivostok, and there are many in the nearby region.

In October 2005, Osmanagić and his supporters initiated a long-running media campaign to promote the pseudo-scientific belief that Visočica hill and the surrounding hills are an ancient pyramid complex. In an interview with Philip Coppens in Nexus (April–May 2006), Osmanagić suggested that they were most likely constructed by the Illyrians, who (according to Osmanagić) lived in the area from 12,000 BC to 500 BC. He has since argued that Visočica is an example of cultures building on top of other cultures. In 2017 Osmanagić was reported to have claimed that the structures date back 34,000 years.

In addition, Osmanagić claims that tunnels around the hill complex, which have been named Ravne tunnels, are an ancient man-made underground network. They are claimed to be 2.4 miles (3.8 km) long. He claims to have found fossilised leaves in them dating back 34,000 years.

Osmanagić supports a number of fringe claims, saying he discovered "standing waves" at the top of the largest of the hills, waves which he asserts travel faster than light and prove the existence of a "cosmic internet" that allows for intergalactic communication. He also promotes the idea of ancient astronauts and claims that human beings are the product of genetic engineering.

Osmanagić has given his own names to the hills. He has named the two largest hills as the "Pyramid of the Sun" and the "Pyramid of the Moon" (not to be confused with the genuine pyramids of the Sun and the Moon in Teotihuacan, Mexico). Other hills have been named by Osmanagić as the pyramids of "Love", "the Earth", and "the Dragon".

Local authorities have funded his excavations, and authorized visits to the "pyramids" by school children, with guides telling them the hills are part of their Bosnian heritage. The site has become a tourist destination.

=== Osmanagić's methodology and alleged evidence ===
According to Osmanagić, the dig in 2006 involved an international team of archaeologists from Australia, Austria, Ireland, United Kingdom and Slovenia. However, many archaeologists whom he named have stated they did not agree to participate and were never at the site. Osmanagić also claimed the support of an "Oxford archaeologist", who was found to be an unqualified undergraduate. His foundation's website claimed support of a British Member of Parliament; the name given was not that of any sitting member.

Osmanagić claims that the direction of the hills reveals alignment to support ancient human cosmology. According to Enver Buza, a surveyor from Sarajevo’s Geodetic Institute, the "Pyramid of the Sun" is perfectly oriented to the north. Osmanagić has said that the sides of the pyramid are oriented toward the cardinal points, and has claimed that this could not be produced by natural processes.

Osmanagić's claims have also centred on alleged evidence concerning satellite photography, thermal analysis and radar detection. An article by Ian Traynor for The Guardian in 2006 reported that Osmanagić and his team alleged that their results from such research showed that the hills were not natural formations and that tunnels may exist inside the hills.

According to Osmanagić, his excavations have produced evidence of blocks that he claims may be part of a man-made outer surface. Osmanagić claims that these blocks are made of a concrete poured on-site that was stronger than today's versions.

== Scholarly response ==
Osmanagić's claims have been repeatedly condemned by qualified scientists and archaeologists. Seven leading European archaeologists issued a European Association of Archaeologists Declaration stating:

We, the undersigned professional archaeologists from all parts of Europe, wish to protest strongly at the continuing support by the Bosnian authorities for the so-called "pyramid" project being conducted on hills at and near Visoko. This scheme is a cruel hoax on an unsuspecting public and has no place in the world of genuine science. It is a waste of scarce resources that would be much better used in protecting the genuine archaeological heritage and is diverting attention from the pressing problems that are affecting professional archaeologists in Bosnia-Herzegovina on a daily basis.

The Declaration was signed by Hermann Parzinger, President of German Archaeological Institute in Berlin; Willem Willems, Inspector General of Rijksinspectie Archeologie in The Hague; Jean-Paul Demoule, President of the National Institute for Preventive Archaeological Research (INRAP) in Paris; Romuald Schild, Director of the Institute of Archaeology and Ethnology of the Polish Academy of Sciences in Warsaw; Vassil Nikolov, Director of the Institute of Archaeology of the Bulgarian Academy of Sciences in Sofia; Anthony Harding, President of the European Association of Archaeologists; and Mike Heyworth, Director of the Council for British Archaeology in York.

Osmanagić's assertions have been categorically refuted by a number of experts, who have accused him of promoting pseudo-scientific notions and damaging valuable archaeological sites with his excavations. Amar Karapuš, a curator at the Historical Museum of Bosnia and Herzegovina in Sarajevo, said, "When I first read about the pyramids I thought it was a very funny joke. I just couldn't believe that anyone in the world could believe this." Garrett Fagan of Penn State University is quoted as saying, "They should not be allowed to destroy genuine sites in the pursuit of these delusions[...] It's as if someone were given permission to bulldoze Stonehenge to find secret chambers of lost ancient wisdom underneath."

Enver Imamović of the University of Sarajevo, a former director of the National Museum of Sarajevo, concerned that the excavations will damage historic sites such as the medieval royal capital Visoki, said that the excavations would "irreversibly destroy a national treasure".

Excavations in the summer of 2008 by archaeologists who are not related to Osmanagić's Foundation uncovered medieval artifacts, which led to renewed calls for the government to cancel Osmanagić's digging permits.

A former employee, Nadija Nukić, told a Bosnian newspaper that carvings on stones that Osmanagić characterizes as dating from ancient times were not present when the stones were first uncovered. They were later inscribed by Osmanagić's team. Osmanagić has denied this statement.

=== Responses by archaeologists ===
Curtis Runnels, an American expert on prehistoric Greece and the Balkans from Boston University, states that the inhabitants of the area, to whom Osmanagić credits the building of the "pyramids", were a primitive people who were small in number and who "did not have the tools or skills to engage in the construction of monumental architecture". Runnels has said that cultures able to build large structures of that type emerged in the region only around 2,500 years ago, but did not construct such earthworks. He has also pointed out that a pyramidal shape is resistant to certain forces; it is a surviving, common form produced by natural causes.

After visiting Visočica hill, British professor Anthony Harding, president of the European Association of Archaeologists, wrote a letter to The Times (published 25 April 2006), referring to Osmanagić's theories as "wacky" and "absurd". He expressed concerns that the government of Bosnia had insufficient safeguards in place to protect the country's "rich heritage" from "looting and unmonitored or unauthorised development".

Brian Stewart, assistant curator at the Museum of Anthropological Archaeology at the University of Michigan, said that "There were very worrying reports that he [Osmanagić] and his team have essentially sculpted the sides of these natural hills into something they think resembles pyramids, in the process stripping away sediment which contains layers of actual archaeology from medieval and earlier periods".

In June 2006, archaeologist Zahi Hawass, former Egyptian Minister of State for Antiquities Affairs, wrote a letter to Archaeology Magazine after his name became linked to the excavations. Osmanagić had allegedly said that Hawass had recommended Egyptian geologist Aly Abdullah Barakat to investigate the hills. Hawass denied all involvement, accusing Osmanagić of spreading falsehoods; in his letter he noted that Barakat had no archaeological knowledge or standing. He further noted that Osmanagić was totally wrong to claim that the Mayan civilization of Mesoamerica originated in Atlantis or the Pleiades constellation.

=== Responses from geology community ===
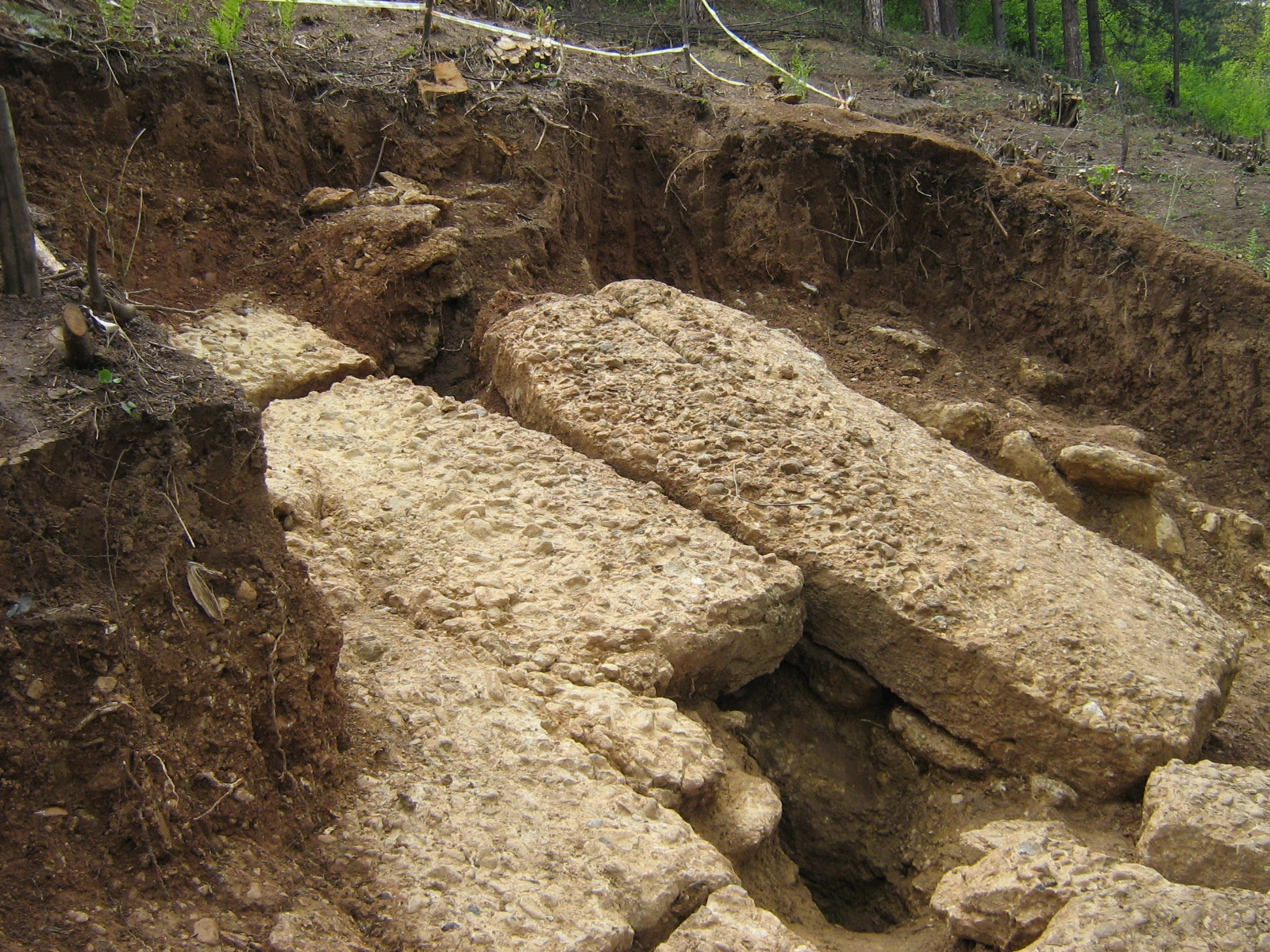
Visočica hill conglomerate layers

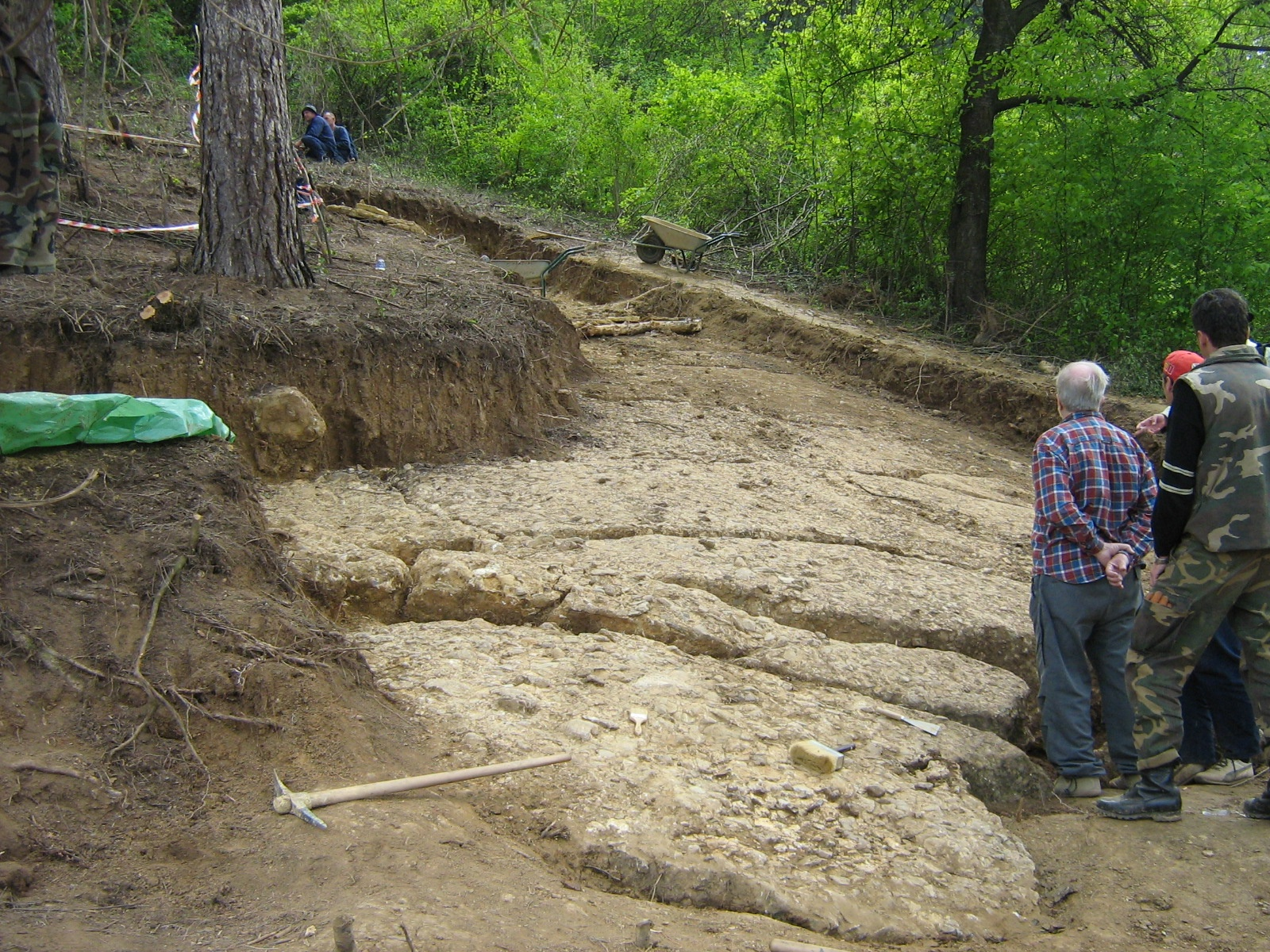
Visočica hill conglomerate layers

The Bosnian Pyramid of the Sun Foundation commissioned a geological team from the University of Tuzla to investigate Visočica. On 8 May 2006, members held a press conference in Tuzla to present the results of their research. The academics, from the Faculty of Mining and Geology and led by Sejfudin Vrabac, concluded that the hill is a natural geological formation, made of clastic sediments of layered composition and varying thickness, and that its shape is a consequence of endodynamical and exodynamical processes in the post-Miocene era. The "pyramid" is composed of the same matter as mountains in the area; layers of conglomerate, clay and sandstone.

According to Professor Vrabac, who specializes in palaeogeology, there are dozens of similar morphological formations in the Sarajevo-Zenica mining basin alone. The geological team report on Visočica, based on the data collected in six drill holes at 3- to 17-metre depths, is supported by the Research and Teaching Council of the Faculty of Mining and Geology, as well as by the Association of Geologists of the Federation of Bosnia and Herzegovina.

In 2006, self-styled geologist from Egypt, Aly Abdullah Barakat, claiming to be an expert on pyramids, inspected some blocks at the hills and announced at first look that they were evidence of pyramids. In a geological report dated 3 November 2007, Barakat denied that nature produces pyramidal shapes and suggested that the main formation seen today may have been a natural hill shaped into a pyramid by human efforts. He described his own results as inconclusive. The very same blocks were inspected by British archaeologist Anthony Harding shortly afterwards, who concluded they did not constitute evidence of pyramids.

The 2006 dig uncovered fractured conglomerate and sandstone plates, which are naturally occurring. Following a visit to the site, American geologist Robert Schoch concluded that these were common natural geological formations of little interest. He accused the workers of carving the hillside to make impressions of stepped sides on the so-called "Pyramid of the Moon", and drew attention to testimony by workers at the site that the alleged ancient inscriptions at the site were freshly made.

=== Responses by sociologists ===
Colin Woodard, writing for the Smithsonian Magazine in December 2009, has suggested that the "Bosnian pyramid" phenomenon may be a societal reaction to the widespread destruction and horrors of the Bosnian War which ended in 1995. He notes that Bosnian leaders, including one prime minister and two presidents, and many Bosnian news outlets have welcomed the theory. It appears to flatter a large and receptive domestic audience with an idea that their homeland was once the seat of a great ancient civilization, and holds out a kind of promise of a bright economic future. Conversely, Woodard notes, those in Bosnia who have attempted to expose the project as a nationalist hoax "have been shouted down and called anti-Bosnian".

Archaeologist Carl Feagans has similarly suggested that Osmanagić appeals to Bosnian nationalists at a time of continuing struggle with economic and social difficulties since the war. Thousands of people in the region were killed in the war, and "authorities estimate the Visoko region suffered about $200 million in damage with the destruction of infrastructure and factories."

With a current population of 11,000, the town of Visoko has many shop owners who are glad to have tourist traffic to help generate revenue in the local and regional economy. Some Bosnians who have volunteered to dig or otherwise work at the site are glad to have something positive to work for.

== Tourism ==
Osmanagić claimed to have attracted 200,000 tourists in the first year of his operations at the site. In 2006 he was seeking funding from investors in Malaysia to construct an archaeological park. He also intended to establish parks around other landmarks which he claims as ancient monuments and scientists say are natural features. Attendance has declined somewhat at the Bosnian hills since the early years, but souvenir sellers say they still depend on the steady business.

Osmanagić has added events claimed to enhance the spiritual atmosphere at the site; for instance, meditation sessions are held in the so-called Ravne tunnels, which he claims to have discovered. In August 2016, Osmanagić claimed that 5,000 people had visited the archeological park since it opened in June of that year. In 2016 Osmanagić's foundation opened Ravne 2 park. The park is visited by tens of thousands of tourists on a yearly basis, but also by a large number of locals and visitors from the surrounding area. It is supported by the Visoko municipal government and Zenica-Doboj canton. The Visoko municipal council declared it as a park of significance.

== Gallery ==
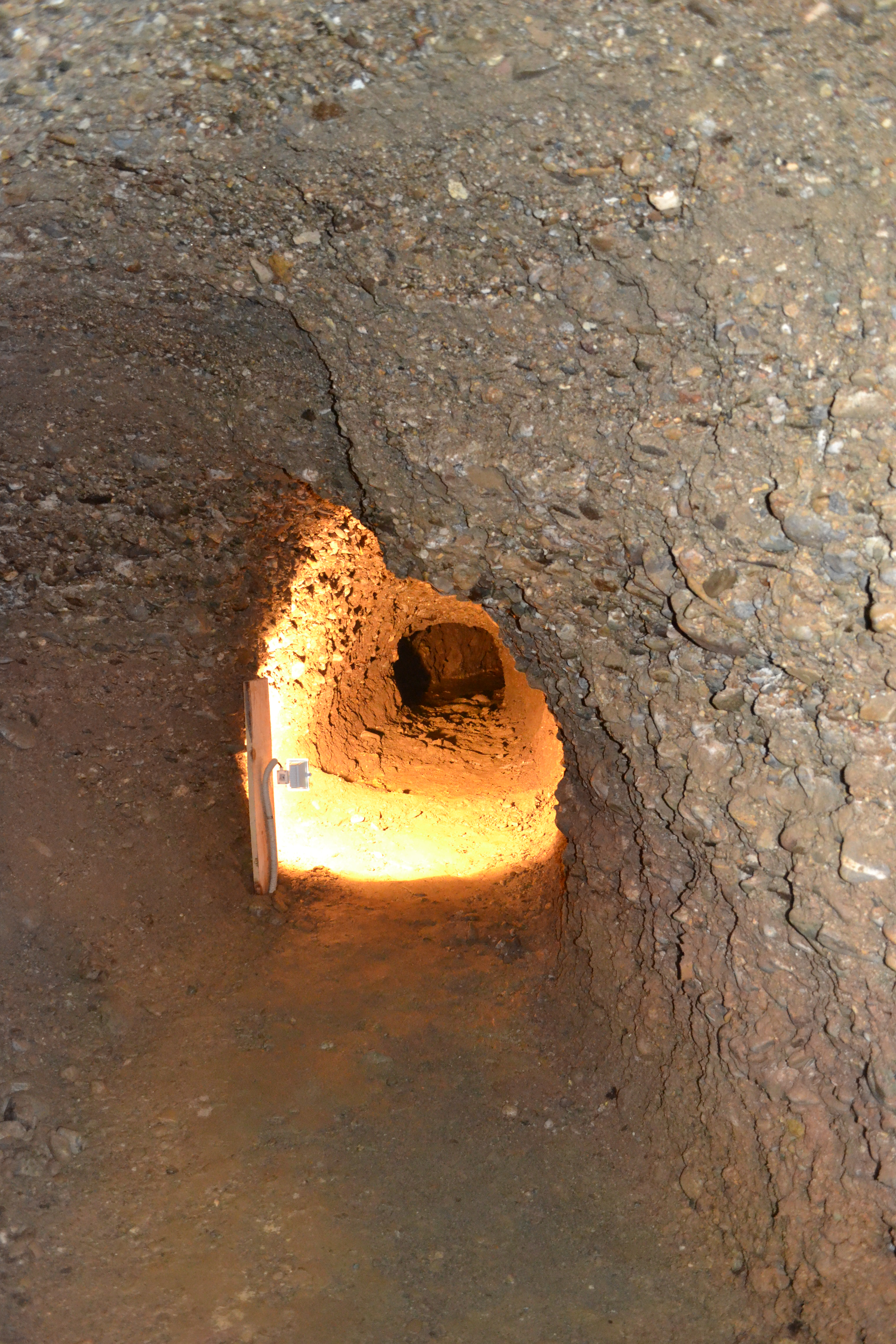
The Ravne tunnels

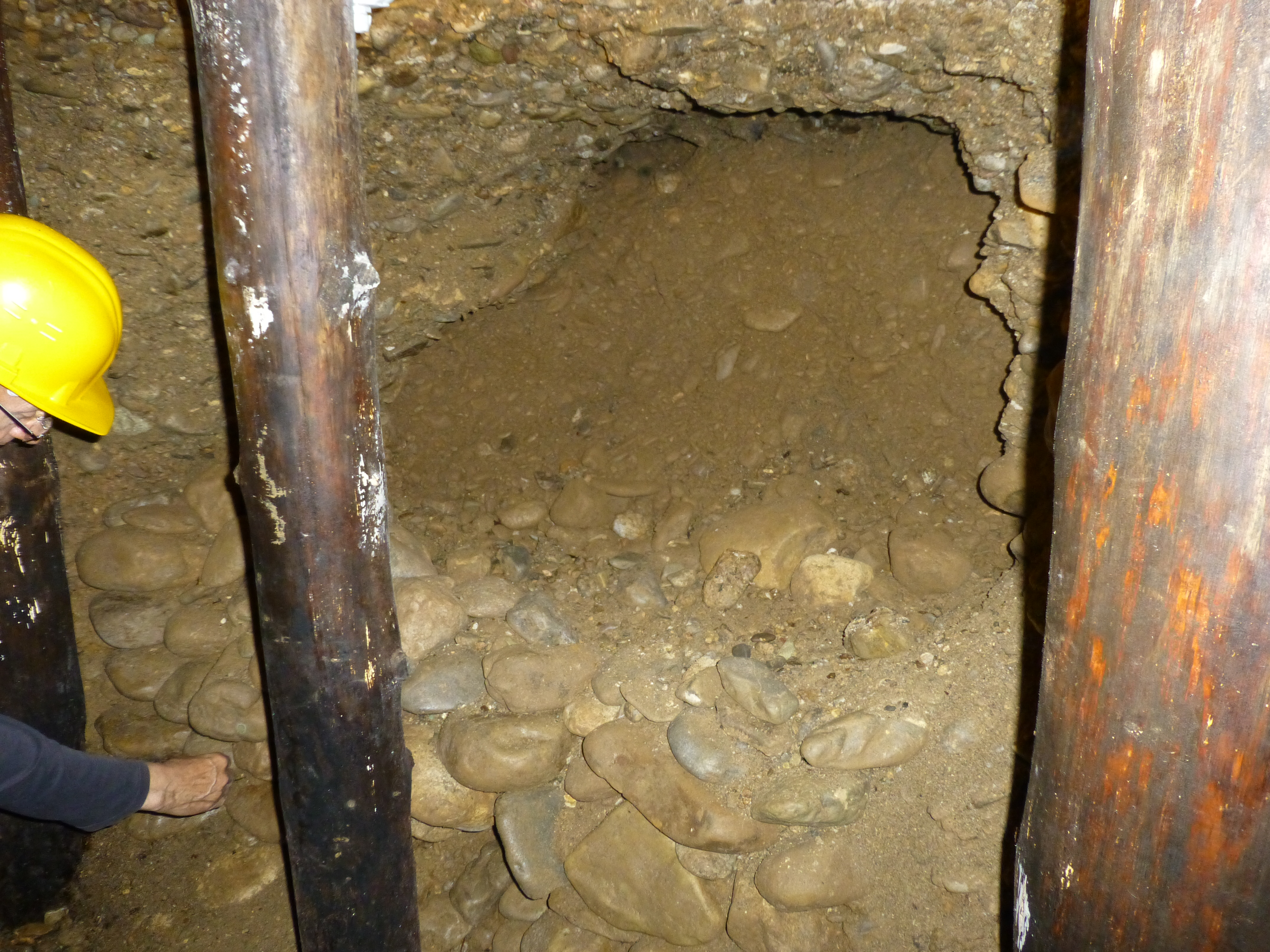
The Ravne tunnels

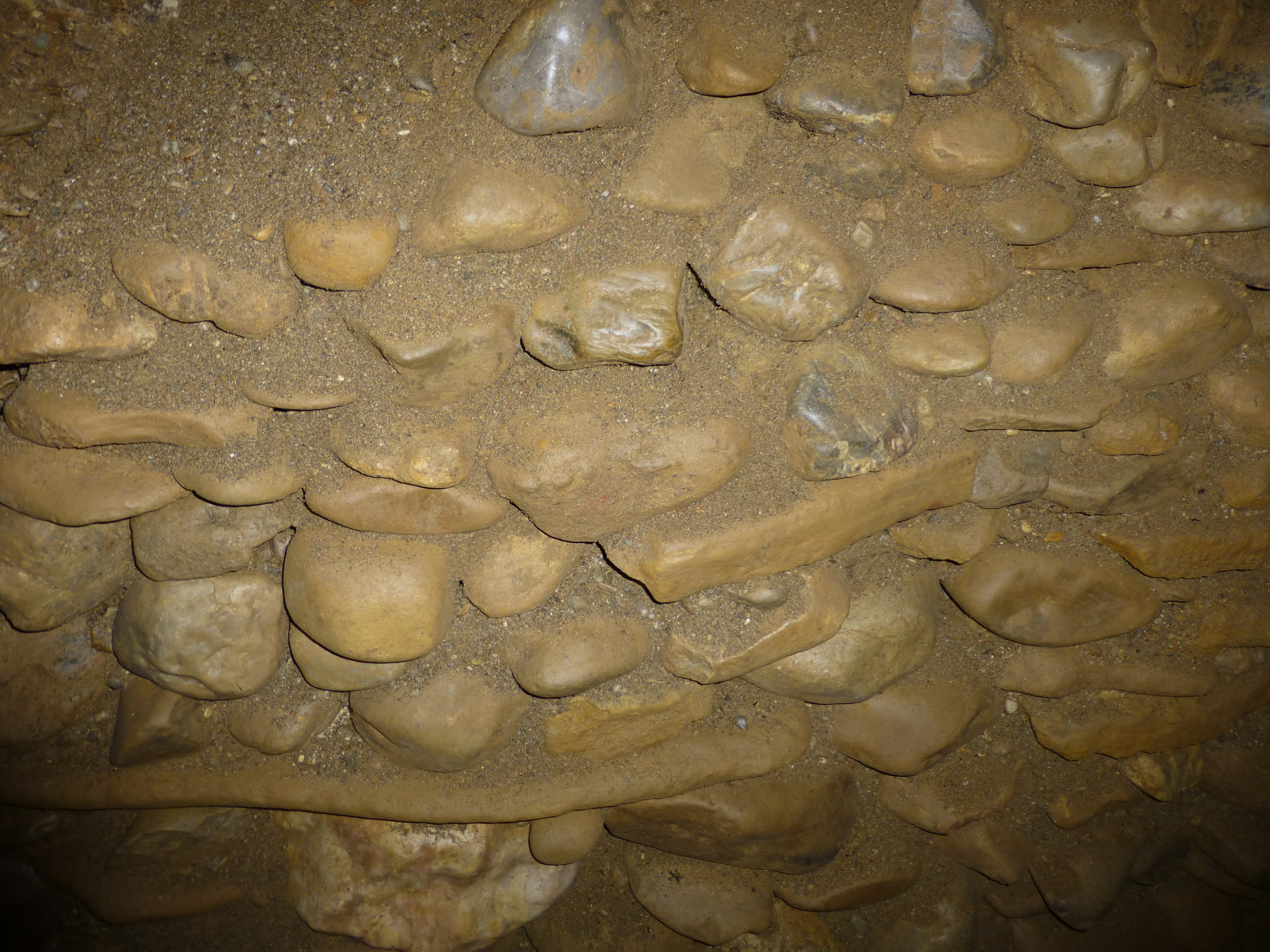
The Ravne tunnels

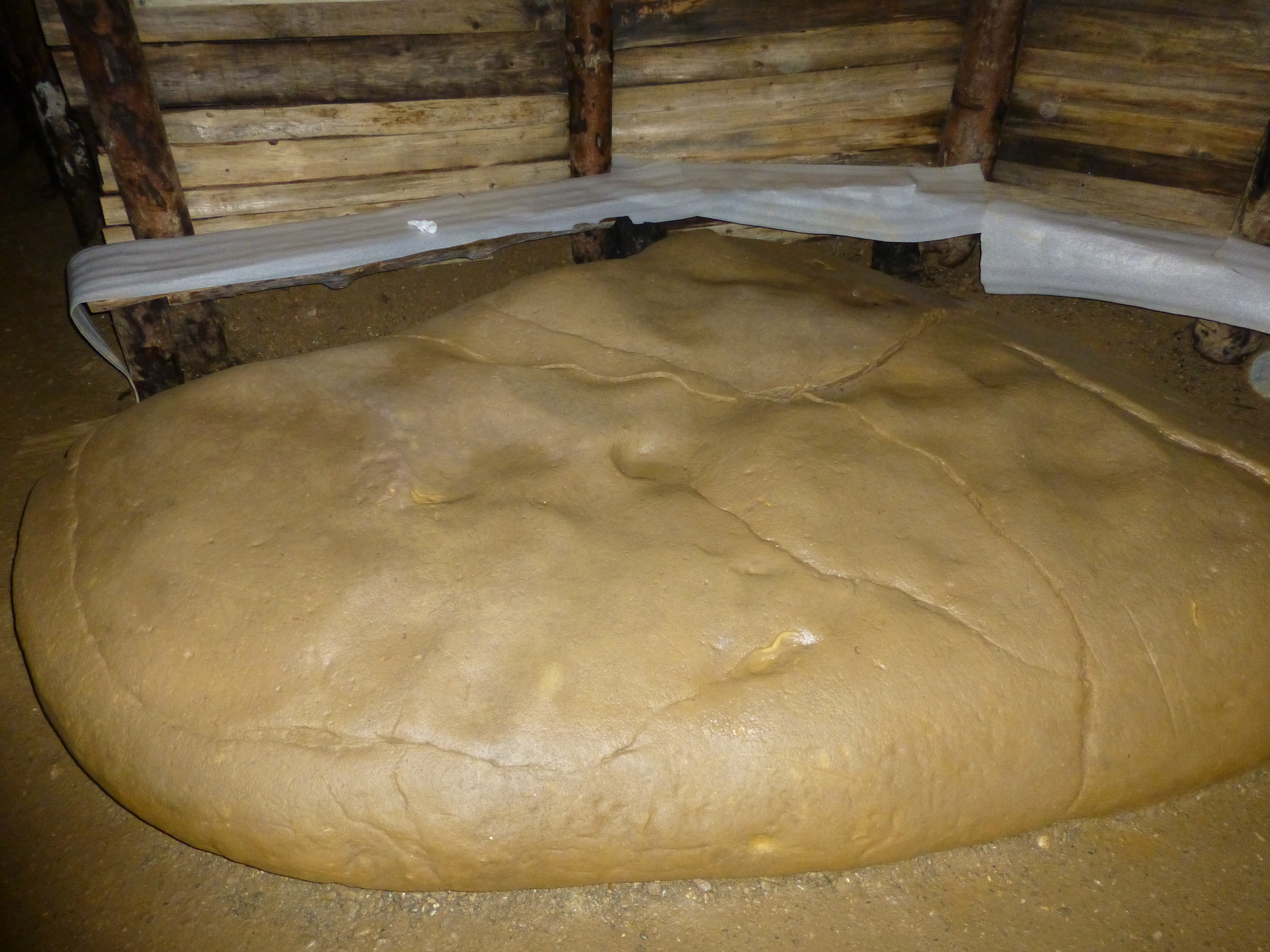
The Ravne tunnels

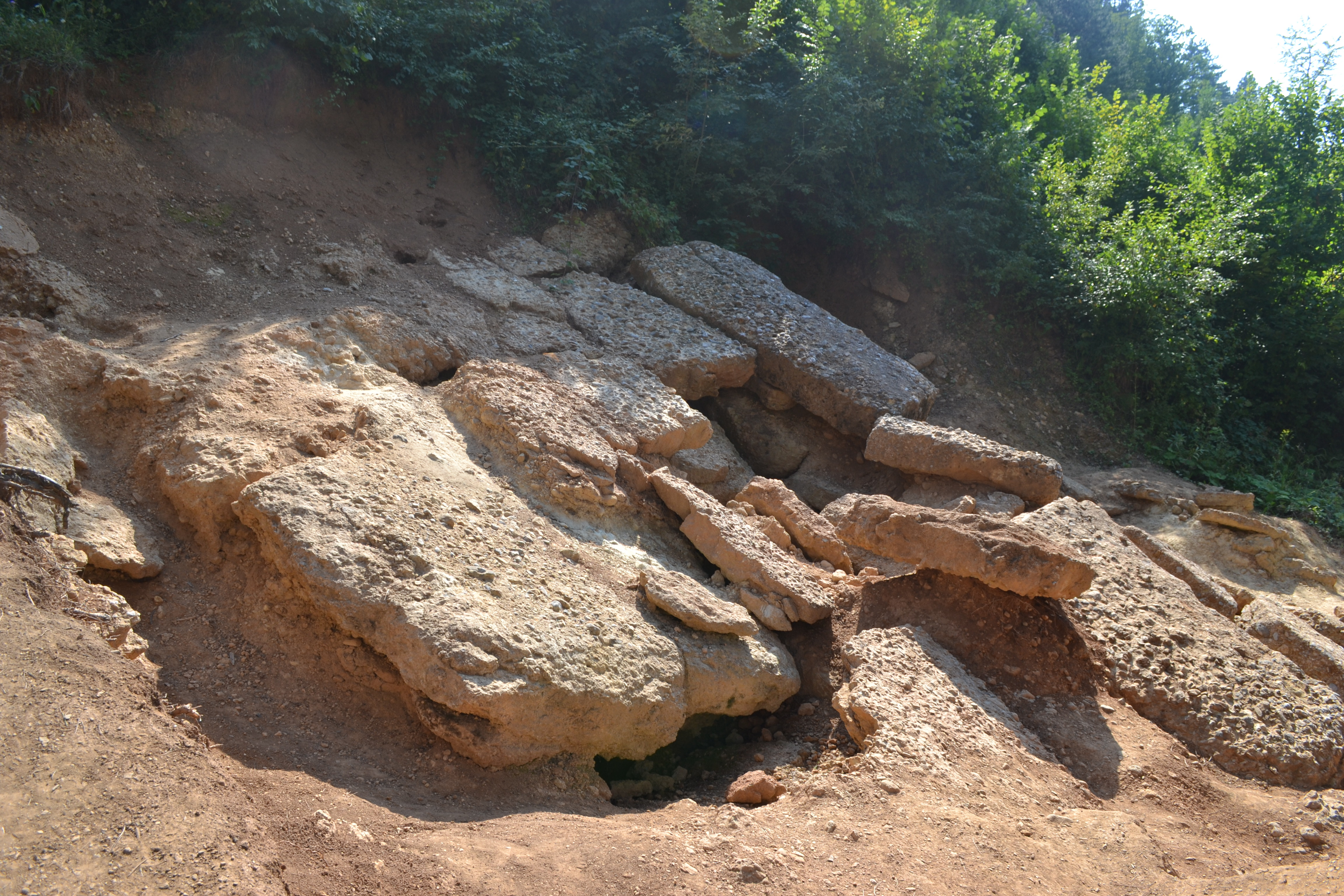
Visočica hill layers

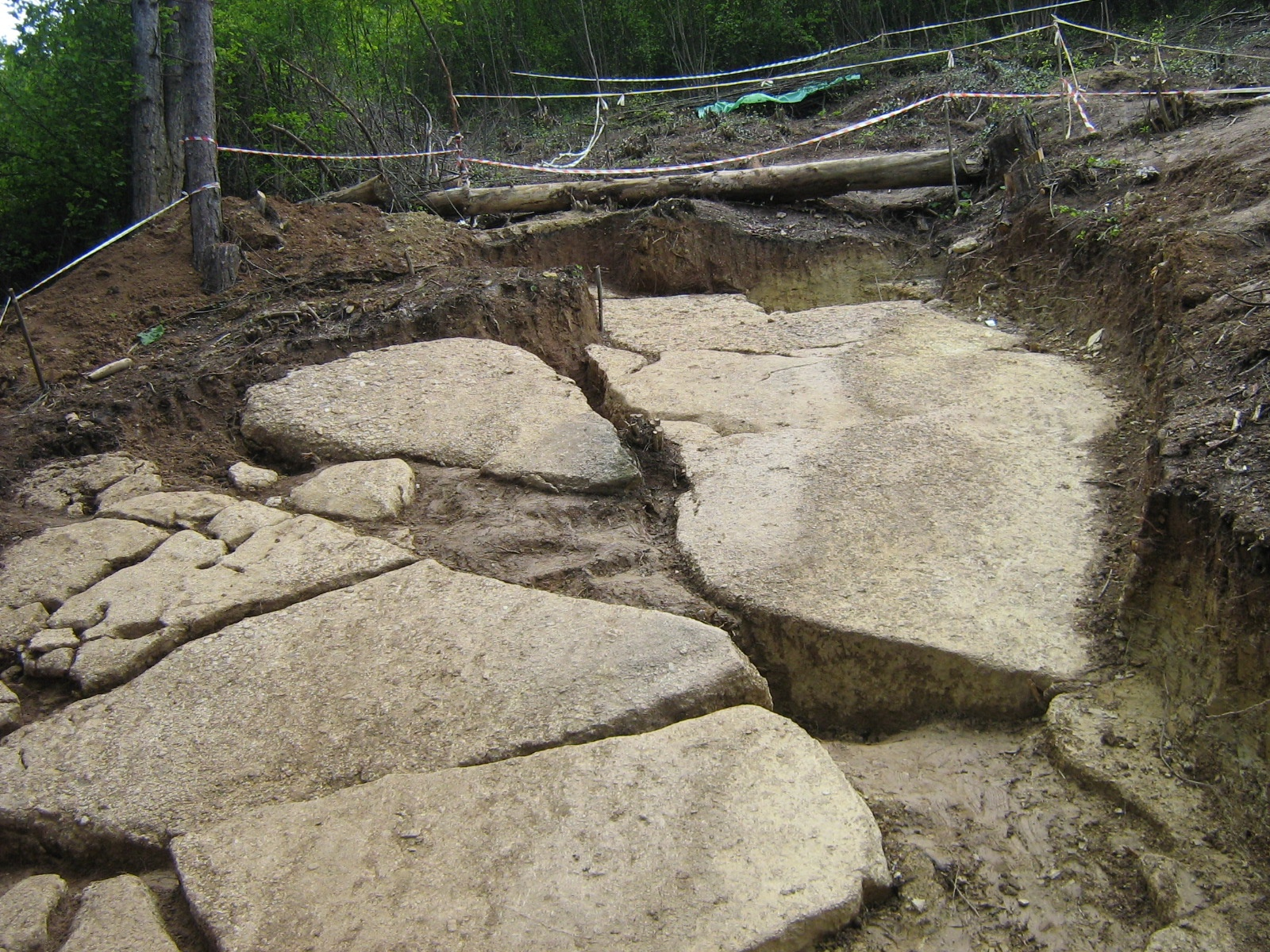
Visočica hill layers

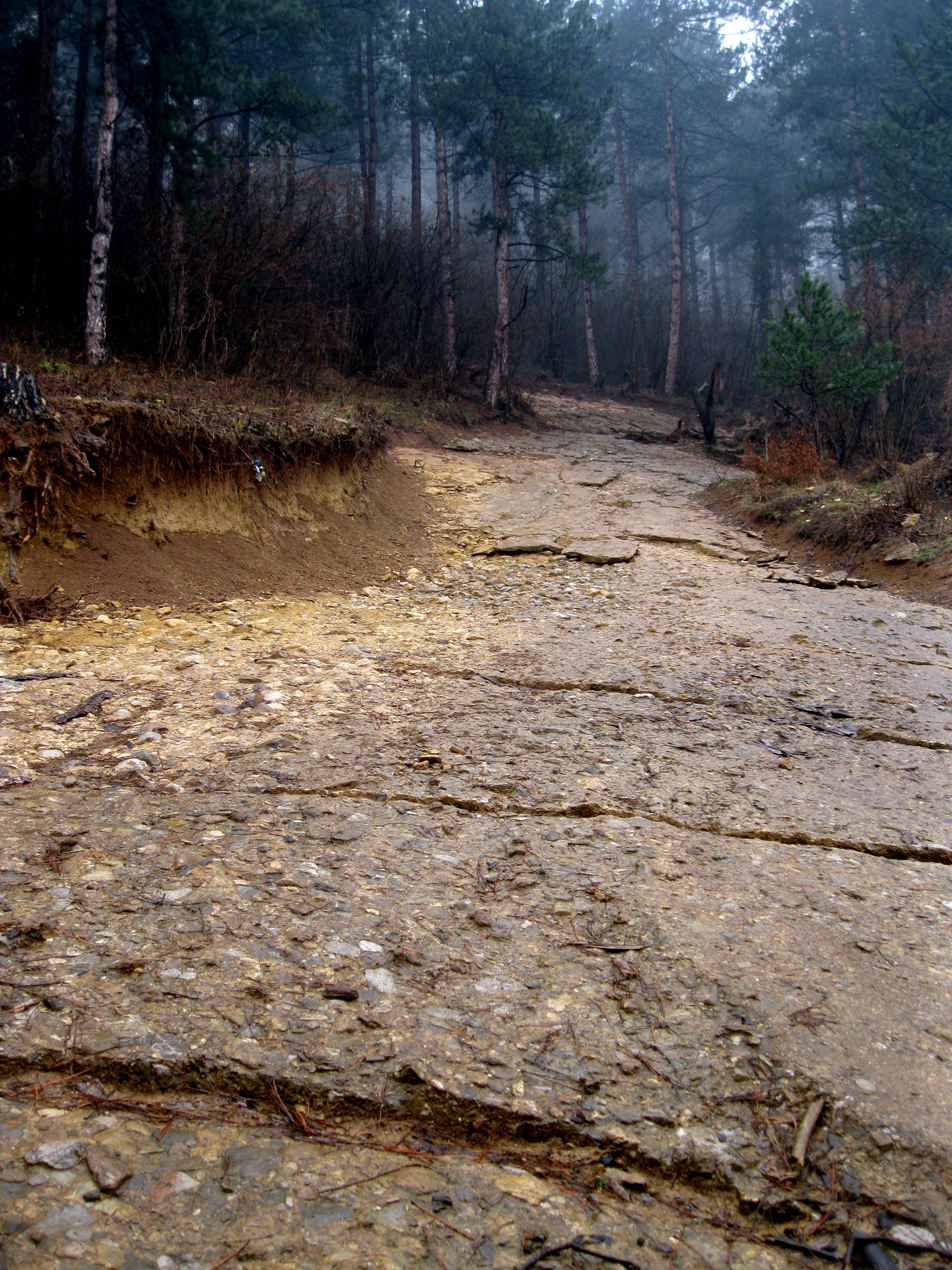
Visočica hill layers

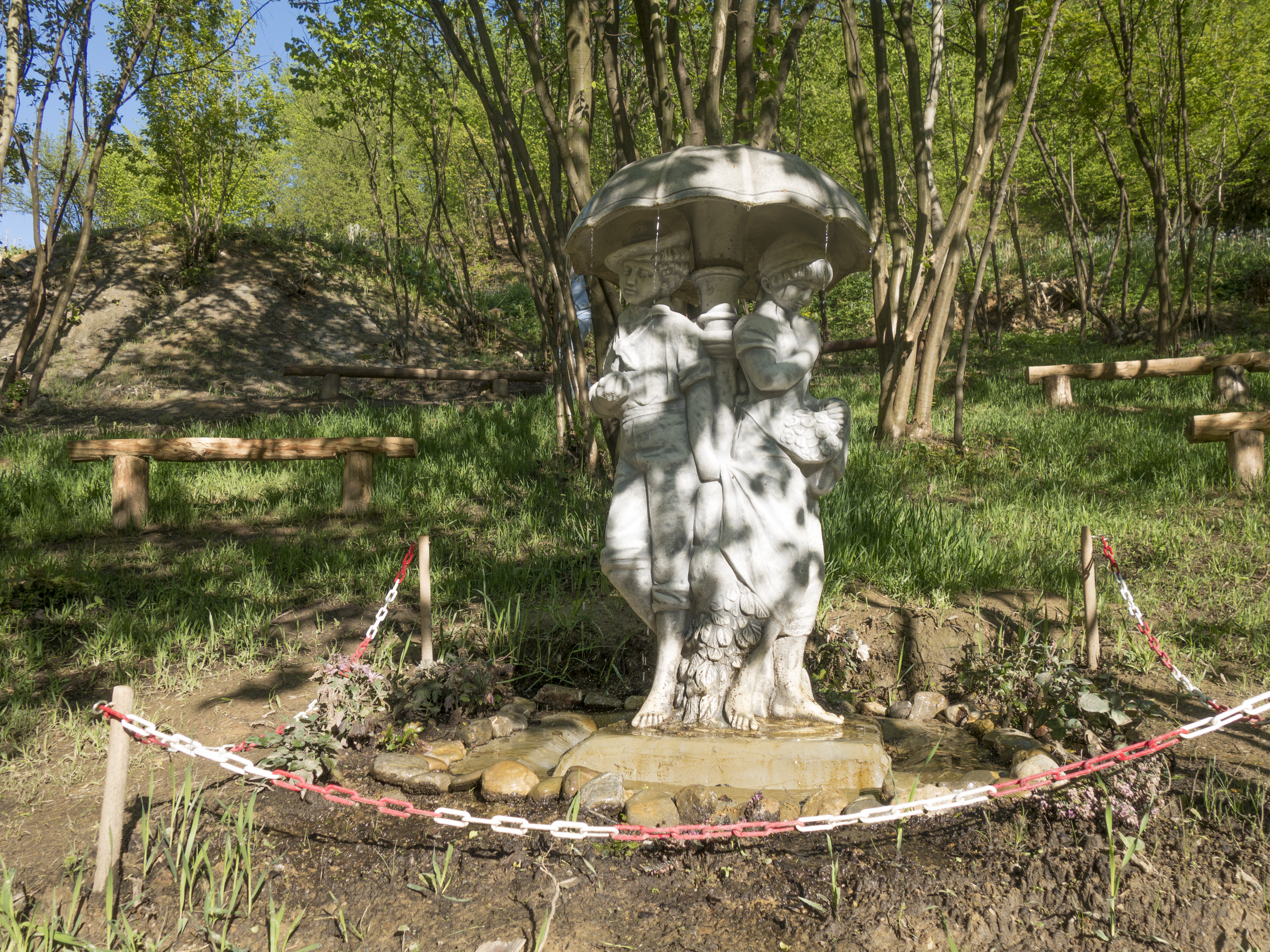
Park Ravne 2

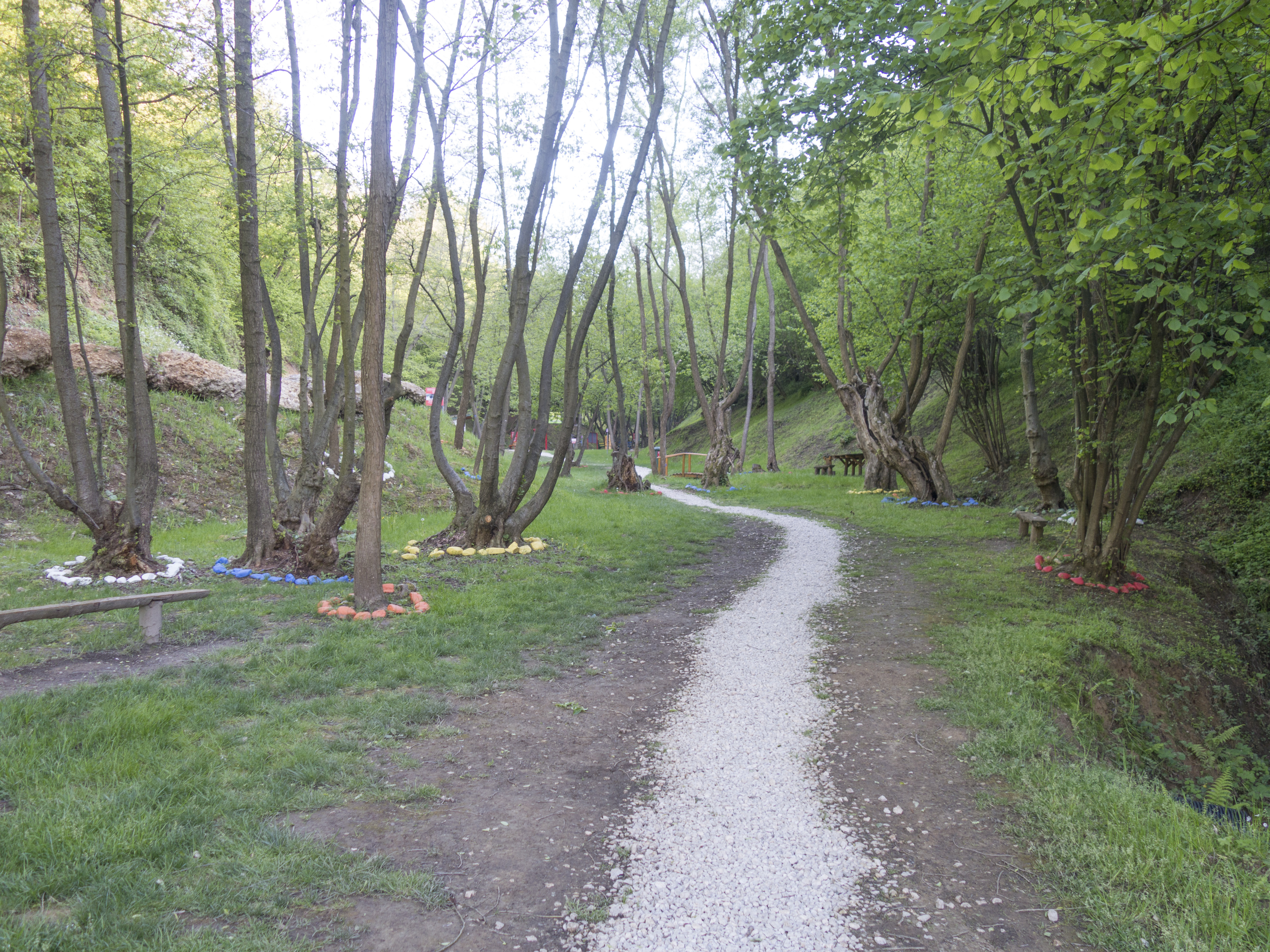
Park Ravne 2

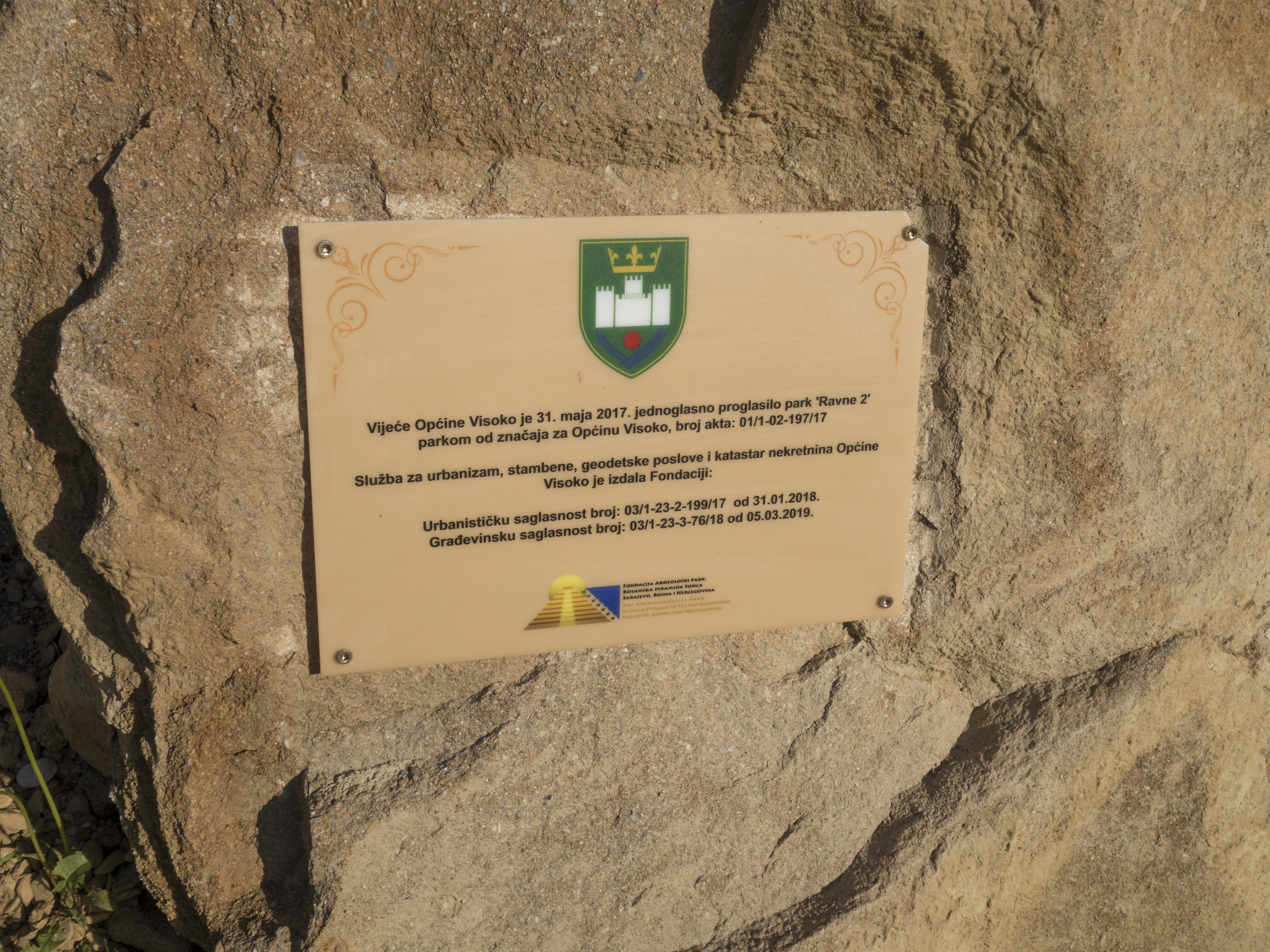
Park Ravne 2

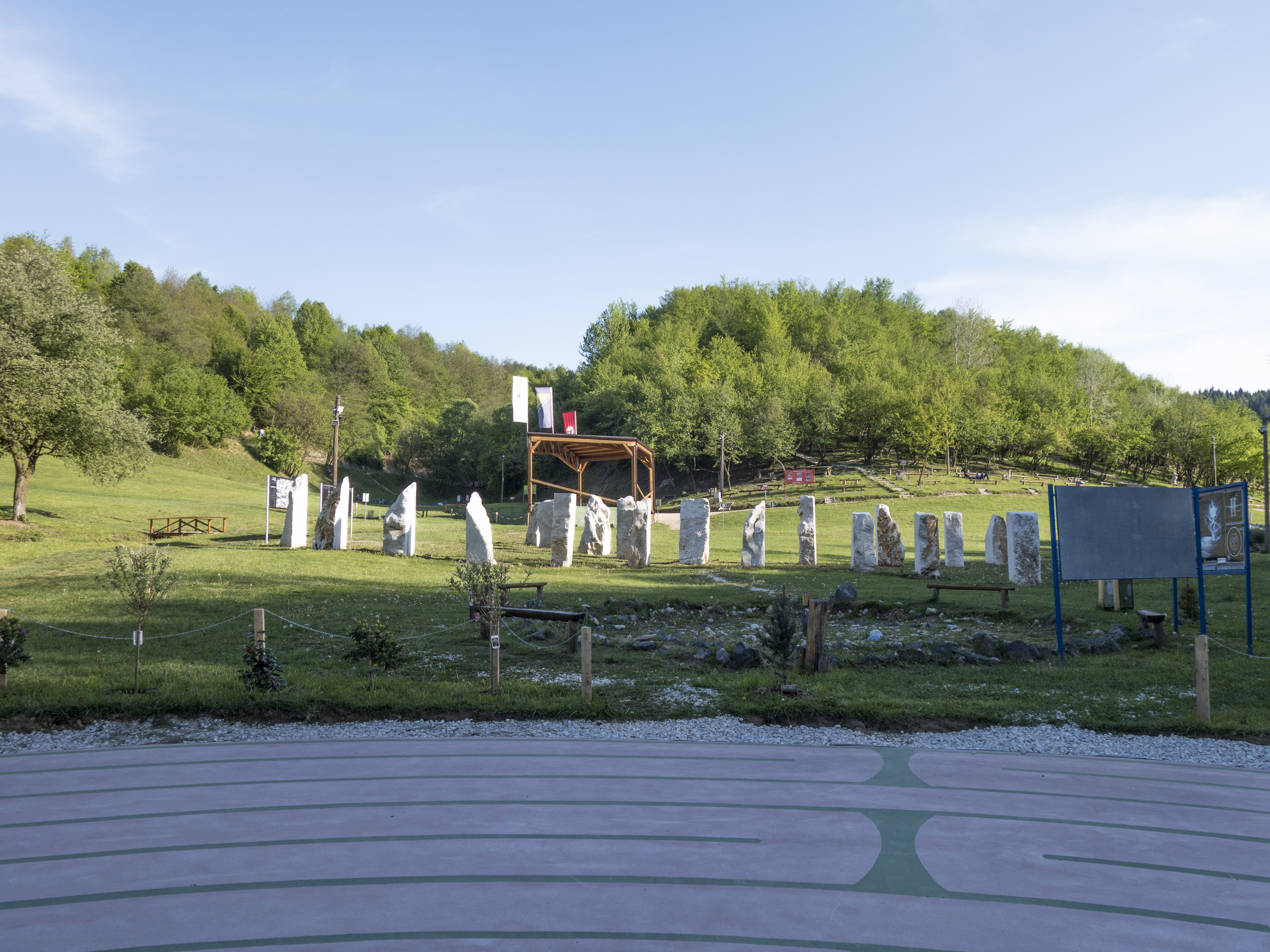
Park Ravne 2

== See also ==
- Exploratory research
- Pseudohistory
- Pyramidology
- Gabela, Herzegovina, which was touted as the location of Troy in the 1980s
- Gunung Padang
