= Biskupići, Visoko =

Biskupići
- Village
- Location within Bosnia and Herzegovina
- Coordinates: 44.0046369°N 18.1433438°E
- Country: Bosnia and Herzegovina
- Entity: Federation of Bosnia and Herzegovina
- Canton: Zenica-Doboj
- Municipality: Visoko

Area
  - Total: 0.56 sq mi (1.44 km^{2})

Population (2013)
  - Total: 338
  - Density: 608/sq mi (235/km^{2})
- Time zone: UTC+1 (CET)
  - Summer (DST): UTC+2 (CEST)

Biskupići is a village in the municipality of Visoko, Bosnia and Herzegovina.

== Demographics ==
According to the 2013 census, its population was 338.

Ethnicity in 2013
Ethnicity	Number	Percentage
Bosniaks	291	86.1%
Croats	4	1.2%
other/undeclared	43	12.7%
Total	338	100%
