= Old town of Visoki =

Castle town in Visoko, Visoko, Bosnia and Herzegovina

- Visoko, Bosnia and Herzegovina
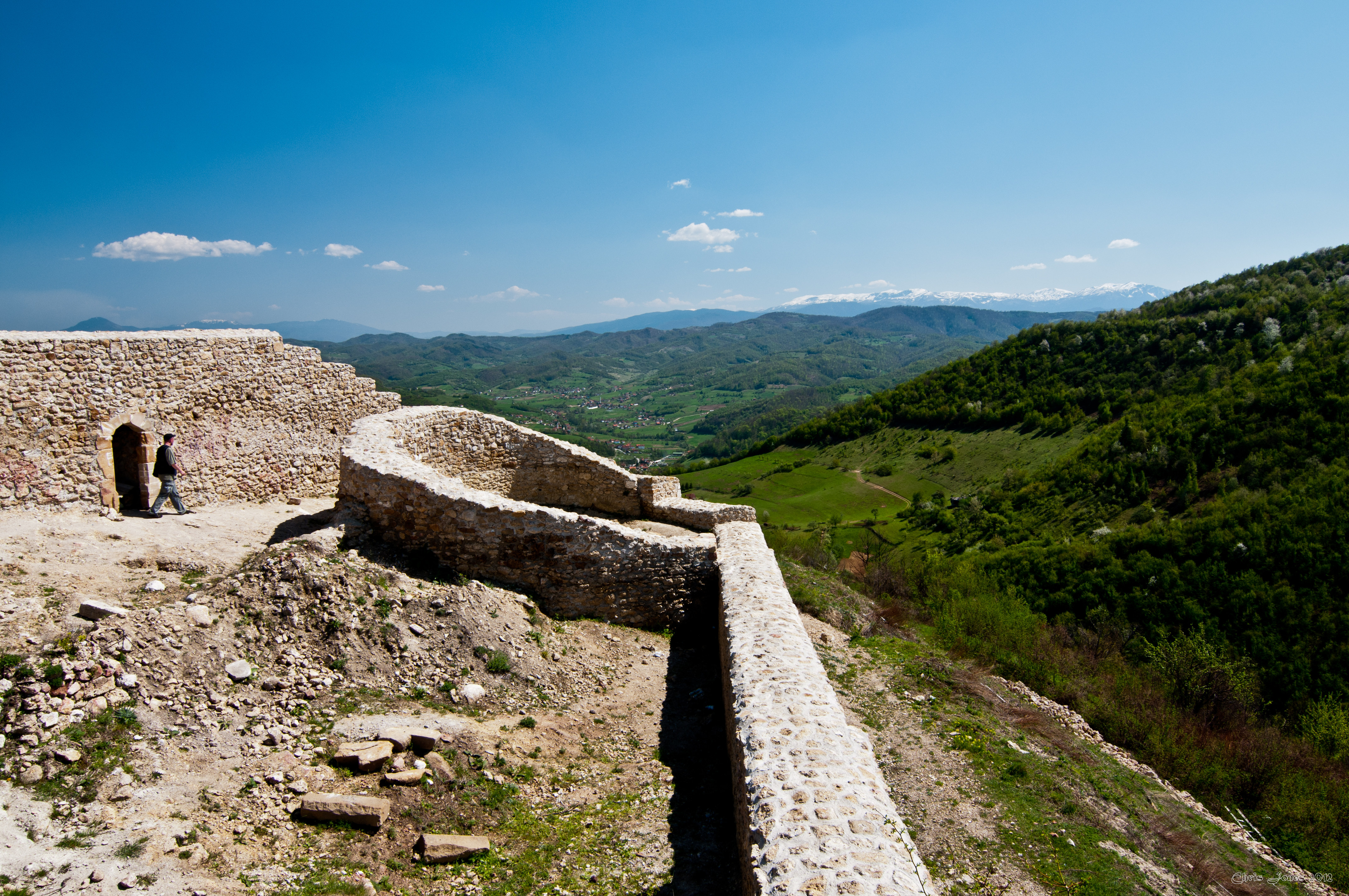
- Reconstruction of the Old Town of Visoki

Location
- Coordinates: 43.976°N 18.176°E

The Old town of Visoki (Serbo-Croatian: Stari grad Visoki, Стари град Високи, pronounced [ʋǐsoki:]) was a medieval royal castle town built during the 14th century on the top of the hill overlooking town of Visoko, Bosnia and Herzegovina. The first mention of the town was on 1 September 1355, in the charter "in castro nosto Visoka vocatum" written by Tvrtko I of Bosnia while he was a young ban. The town was presumably abandoned before 1503, as it is not mentioned in the Turkish-Hungarian treaty from the mentioned year. In 1626, Đorđić mentioned Visoki among abandoned towns.

== Location and size ==
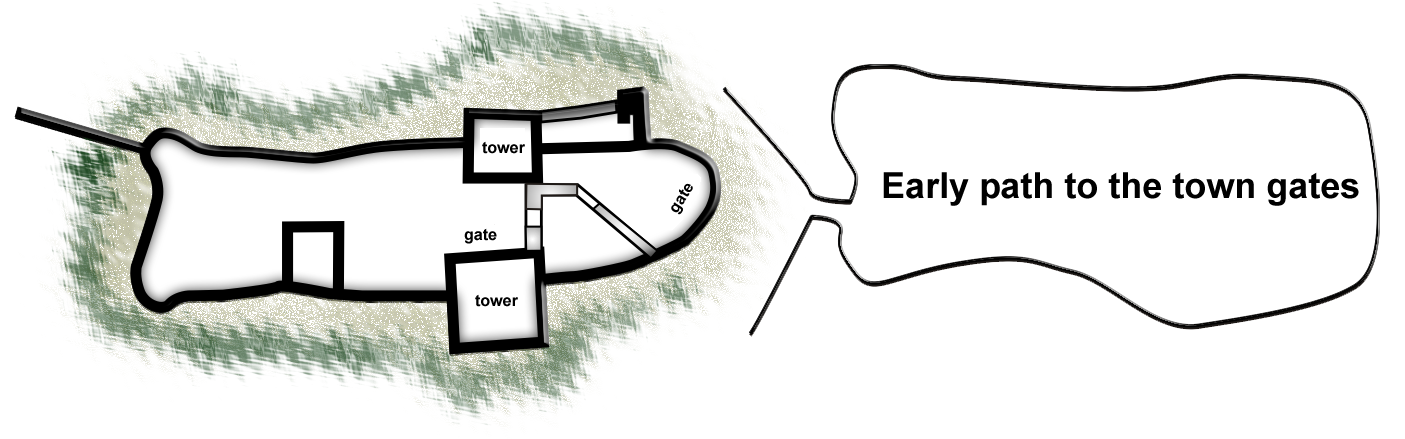
Overhead illustration of the fortress

The Old Town of Visoki is at the top of Visočica hill, 213 metres (699 ft) high. Its position provides an excellent view at the plains below. The entry to the castle is on the southwest side, with two lookout towers. Passing through the entry you enter a part that is called Podvisoki, which was quite small, measuring 60 by 25 metres (197 by 82 ft) and has signs and remains of early medieval houses. The thickness of the castle town walls is about 2 metres (7 ft). Its position provides an excellent view at the plains below bordered by the mountains Romanija, Jahorina, Treskavica and Bjelašnica in the east and southeast, Bitovnja in the south, the mountain Zec and Vranica in the Southeast, Vlašić in the west, and Tajan and Zvijezda in the north.

== Historic importance ==
The primary function of the old town of Visoki was defense, but it was also a place where a lot of medieval Bosnian rulers issued various documents and charters. The first mention of the town itself was in a charter written by the young Tvrtko I named in castro nosto Visoka vocatum on 1 September 1355. The final document of importance signed there was by Tvrtko Borovinić in 1436, showing that it was also of high importance to Bosnian nobility.

== List of written documents ==
- 1355 – Tvrtko I Kotromanić writes charter in castro nostro Visoka vocatum.
- 1398 – Priboje Masnović, duke who was accepted as Ragusa citizen.
- 1402 – Bosnian king Stjepan Ostoja writes charter pod gradom Visoki (beneath town Visoki).
- 1404 – Bosnian king Ostoja writes charter pod Visokim (beneath Visoki).
- 1404 – Two papers were published which were subject of law dispute in Ragusa.
- 1420 – Great Bosnian duke Batić Mirković became very ill; he was buried in village of Kopošići.
- 1429 and 1436 – Duke Tvrtko Borovinić written papers na Visokom (on Visoki). These papers were last direct sources of old town of Visoki.

== See also ==
- Visoko
- Visoko during the Middle Ages
- History of Bosnia and Herzegovina
