= Malo Čajno =

- Village
- Location within Bosnia and Herzegovina
- Coordinates: 44.045751°N 18.1959714°E
- Country: Bosnia and Herzegovina
- Entity: Federation of Bosnia and Herzegovina
- Canton: Zenica-Doboj
- Municipality: Visoko

Area
  - Total: 1.75 sq mi (4.54 km^{2})

Population (2013)
  - Total: 492
  - Density: 281/sq mi (108/km^{2})
- Time zone: UTC+1 (CET)
  - Summer (DST): UTC+2 (CEST)

Malo Čajno is a village in the municipality of Visoko, Bosnia and Herzegovina.

== Demographics ==
According to the 2013 census, its population was 492.

Ethnicity in 2013
Ethnicity	Number	Percentage
Bosniaks	313	63.6%
Serbs	6	1.2%
other/undeclared	173	35.2%
Total	492	100%
