= Goduša, Visoko =

Goduša Годуша
- Village
- Location within Bosnia and Herzegovina
- Coordinates: 43.9289528°N 18.1600013°E
- Country: Bosnia and Herzegovina
- Entity: Federation of Bosnia and Herzegovina
- Canton: Zenica-Doboj
- Municipality: Visoko

Area
  - Total: 1.56 sq mi (4.05 km^{2})

Population (2013)
  - Total: 466
  - Density: 298/sq mi (115/km^{2})
- Time zone: UTC+1 (CET)
  - Summer (DST): UTC+2 (CEST)

Goduša is a village in the municipality of Visoko, Bosnia and Herzegovina.

== Demographics ==
According to the 2013 census, its population was 466.

Ethnicity in 2013
Ethnicity	Number	Percentage
Bosniaks	465	99.8%
other/undeclared	1	0.2%
Total	466	100%
