= Semir Osmanagić =

Bosnian author

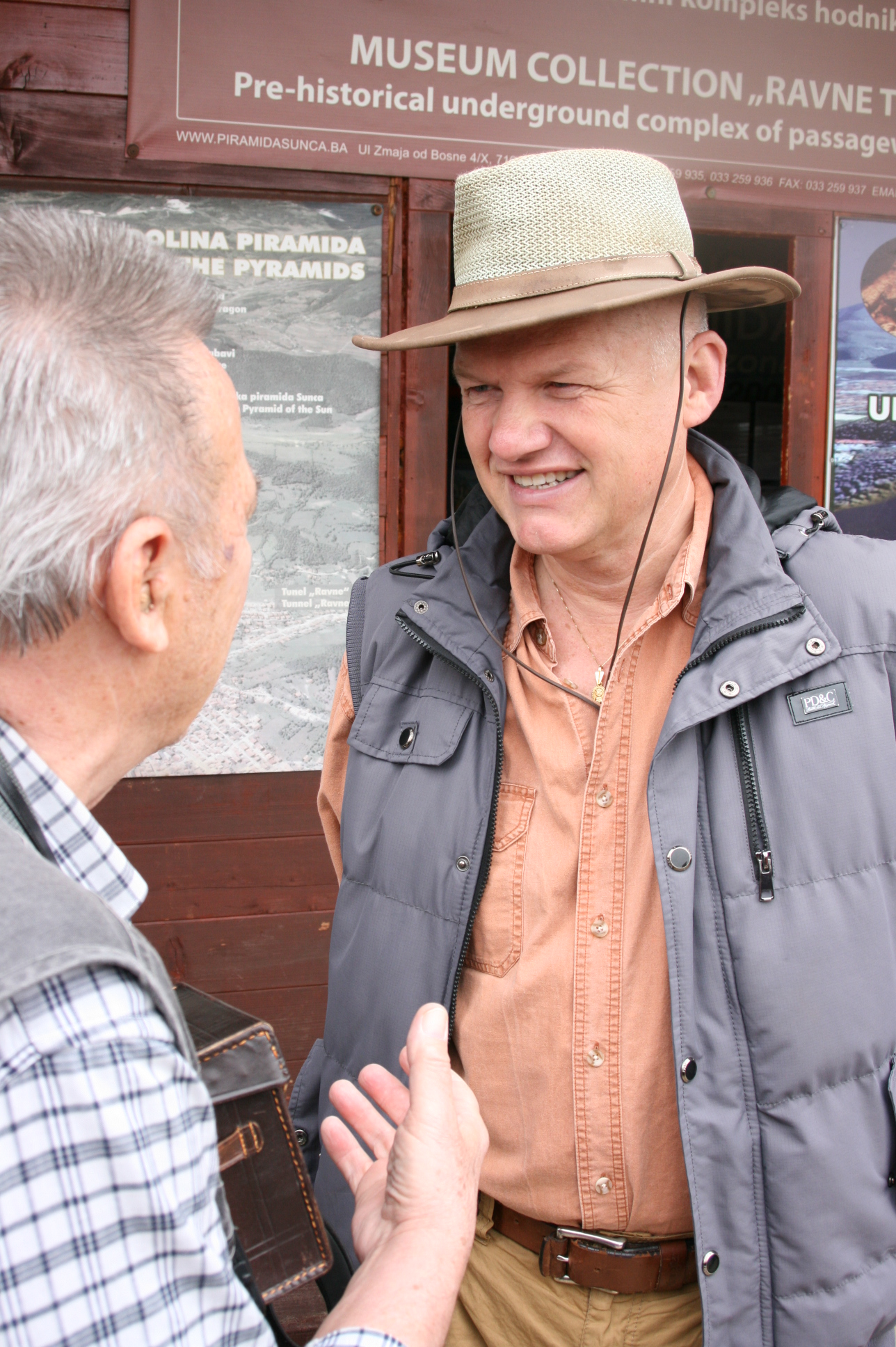
- Osmanagić speaking with a tourist in May 2014
- Born: June 1, 1960 (age 66); Zenica, PR Bosnia and Herzegovina, Yugoslavia
- Other name: Sam Osmanagich
- Education: University of Sarajevo
- Occupations: Businessman; author
- Known for: Bosnian pyramid claims
- Website: semirosmanagic.com/en/

Semir Osmanagić (born June 1, 1960), also known as Sam Osmanagich, is a Bosnian-American businessman and author. He is best known for promoting his pseudo-archaeological project in central Bosnia (near the town of Visoko) related to the so-called "Bosnian pyramids". Osmanagić claims that a cluster of natural hills in central Bosnia and Herzegovina are the largest human-made ancient pyramids on Earth. He has conducted extensive marketing about the site and promoted tourism there.

A pyramid enthusiast, Osmanagić completed a doctorate in social sciences but does not have a science background in any archaeological field. Professional geologists, archaeologists and other scientists have refuted his claims about the central Bosnian hills; they have concluded – after direct analysis of the site, its known history, and excavations – that the hills are common natural formations known as flatirons with no signs of human construction.

== Early life and career ==
Osmanagić was born in Zenica, PR Bosnia and Herzegovina, Yugoslavia. After graduating from University of Sarajevo, he ran an import-export business for seven years. In 1992 as the Bosnian War was breaking out, he emigrated to the United States. He settled in Houston, Texas, where he found a job as a marketing assistant for a company producing parts for oil and gas wells. He was promoted to manager and minority owner in the firm, holding a five percent stake in 1999.

Osmanagić founded the manufacturing company Met Company, Inc. in Houston in 1995, and continues to be its owner and CEO. In 2006, he founded the Bosnian Pyramids of the Sun Foundation, to support excavations and construction of an "archaeological park" at the site. He has served from the beginning as its executive director.

He holds a master's degree in international economics and politics. He completed a doctoral degree in social sciences in 2009; both degrees were obtained from the University of Sarajevo. In 2009 he became a member of the Russian Academy of Natural Sciences which has come under criticism for promoting pseudoscientific theories; a large number of the purported academy's members also had no formal education in natural sciences or any scientific credentials in applicable fields of research. This association should not be confused with the unrelated Russian Academy of Sciences, which has reputable standing among the international community of scientists.

== Bosnian pyramid claims ==
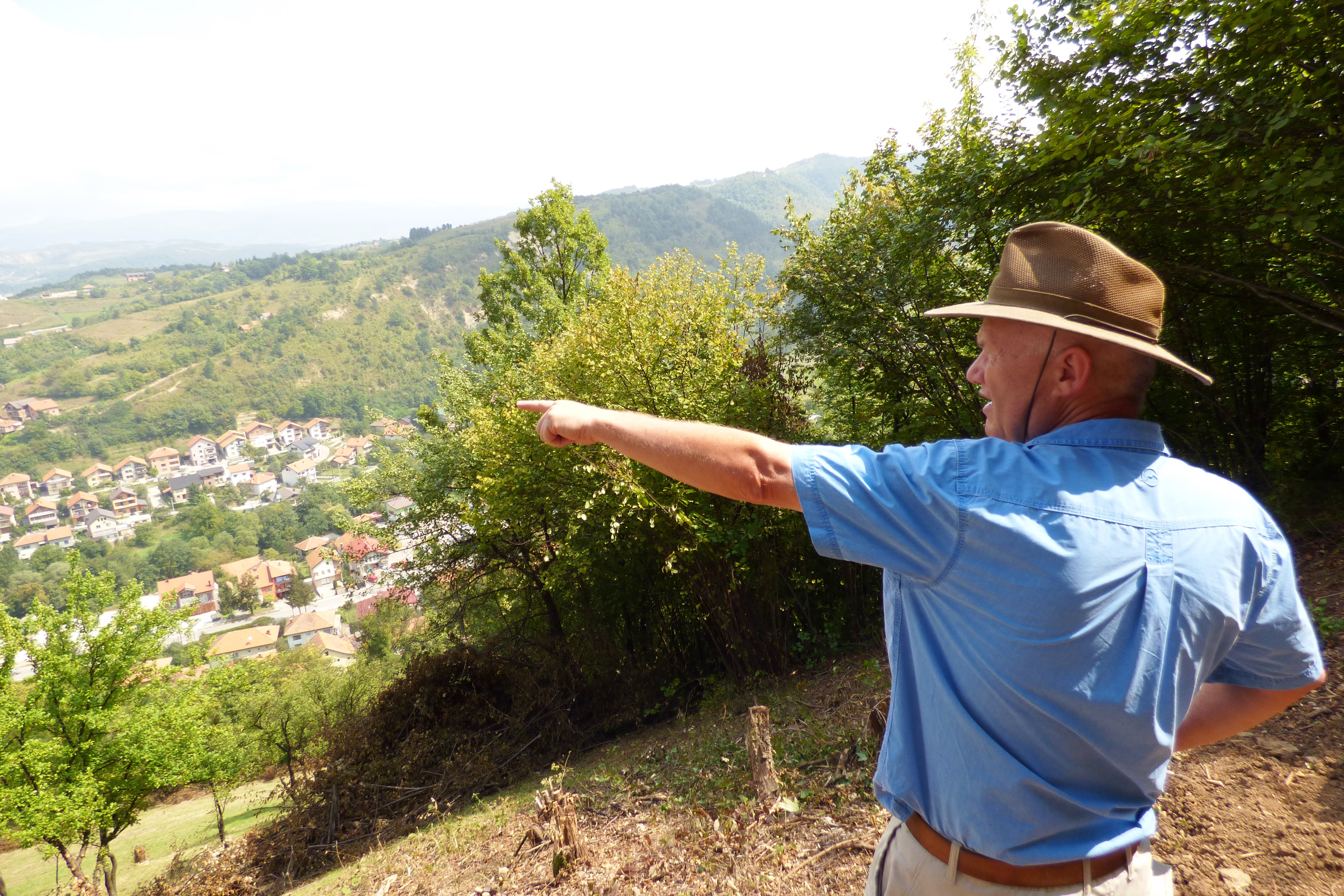
Osmanagić by the Visočica hill in July 2019.

In April 2005, Osmanagić was invited to visit Visočica and its fortress ruins. During the visit Osmanagić noticed the pyramidal shape of Visočica hill. He subsequently wrote a book promoting the claim that the hill was the remains of an ancient, man-made pyramid, which he claimed was one of five colossal stone structures in the shape of a pyramid with an extensive prehistoric tunnel network. He named those structures "Bosnian pyramids", and established a charitable foundation, the 'Archaeological Park: Bosnian Pyramid of the Sun Foundation', to fund the promotion and investigation of the site. Osmanagić claimed that he wished to excavate in order to "break a cloud of negative energy, allowing the Earth to receive cosmic energy from the centre of the galaxy".

In early 2006, geologists from the University of Tuzla analyzed core samples at Visočica. Their tests showed that the hill is composed of the same material as other mountains in the area: alternating layers of conglomerate, clay and sandstone. Excavations revealed layers of fractured conglomerate at Visočica, while those at Pljesevica uncovered cracked sandstone plates, separated by layers of silt and clay. Robert M. Schoch, associate professor of Natural Science at Boston University, said at the time, "What [Osmanagić has] found isn't even unusual or spectacular from the geological point of view. It's completely straightforward and mundane." In April 2006, twenty-one historians, geologists and archaeologists signed an open letter describing the excavations as amateurish and lacking proper scientific supervision.

The 'Bosnian Pyramid' project is alleged to have done considerable damage to the archaeological heritage of the area, which contains ruins of a medieval capital, Roman observation post, and earlier remains. Anthony Harding, Professor of Archaeology at Exeter University and then-president of the European Association of Archeologists, said that, "Osmanagić is conducting a pseudo-archaeological project that, disgracefully, threatens to destroy parts of Bosnia's real heritage."

== Other claims ==
Osmanagić's theories and credibility have come under near-universal criticism from the scientific community since he gained prominence in marketing the excavations at Visočica. He is interested in pyramids but is an amateur in their study.

During this period, he has pursued graduate study at the University of Sarajevo, where his doctoral adviser was Hidajet Repovac, Professor of Sociology at Faculty of Political Science in Sarajevo. In his 2009 doctoral thesis, Osmanagić claims that the Maya civilization of Mesoamerica predates the Olmec, and that their culture mysteriously ceased to exist after the 10th century CE. He also discusses in some detail Mayan crystal skulls, positing that they were created with the use of advanced technology. He discusses the alleged psychological and parapsychological phenomena surrounding them. He suggests that the Maya had contact with the Chinese, giving as an example a jade carving of a jaguar, which he posits is carved from Chinese nephrite. Others have identified the material as jadeite, a material used by the Mayans.

As early as 2007, Repovac was part of the Foundation set up by Osmanagić to support excavations on the hills. Repovac also served as one of the co-chairmen of the 2008 International Conference on the (so-called) Bosnian Pyramids.

In an article in Archaeology Magazine, Beth Kampschror refers to Osmanagić's book, The World of the Maya (2004), which suggests that the Maya were descendants of aliens from the Pleiades by way of Atlantis. Osmanagić wrote in his book, "Were perhaps those who were ready picked up in spaceships by their mentors from the Pleiades star cluster? Or perhaps they joined the Lords of the Galaxy and, in pods of light, set off on a journey with no return." Osmanagić also wrote,

"It is my theory that the Maya should be considered watchmakers of the cosmos whose mission it is to adjust the Earthly frequency and bring it into accordance with the vibrations of our Sun;... Their ancestors, the civilizations of Atlantis and Lemuria, erected the first temples on energy potent points of the Planet. Their most important function was to serve as a gateway to other worlds and dimensions."

In his book Alternative History (2003, published in Bosnian), Osmanagić suggests that Hitler and other leading Nazis escaped from Germany at the end of World War II to an underground base in Antarctica.

== Bibliography ==
- Sam Osmanagich, Pyramids around the World, The New Era Times Press, 2012, Houston, Texas (language: English)
- Semir Sam Osmanagich, Bosnian Valley of the Pyramids, Mauna-Fe Publishing, 2006, Sarajevo, Bosnia-Herzegovina (language: English)
- Sam Osmanagich, The Mayan World, Gorgias Press, 2005, Piscataway, New Jersey, USA (language: English)
- Sam Osmanagich, The World of Maya, Svjetlost, 2004, Sarajevo, Bosnia-Herzegovina (language: English)
- Sam Osmanagich, Alternativna povijest – tragovima Atlantide, Indrija, 2003, Zagreb (385/1-370-7688)(language: Croatian)
- Semir Osmanagich & Peggy Sue Skipper Ancient History from Beyond the Veil: An Akashic Records Experiment Bridges the Gap Between Science and Spirituality, Blue Bonnets Boots and Books,2011
