= Visočica (hill) =

Hill near Visoko, Bosnia and Herzegovina

Coordinates: 43°58′42″N 18°10′40″E

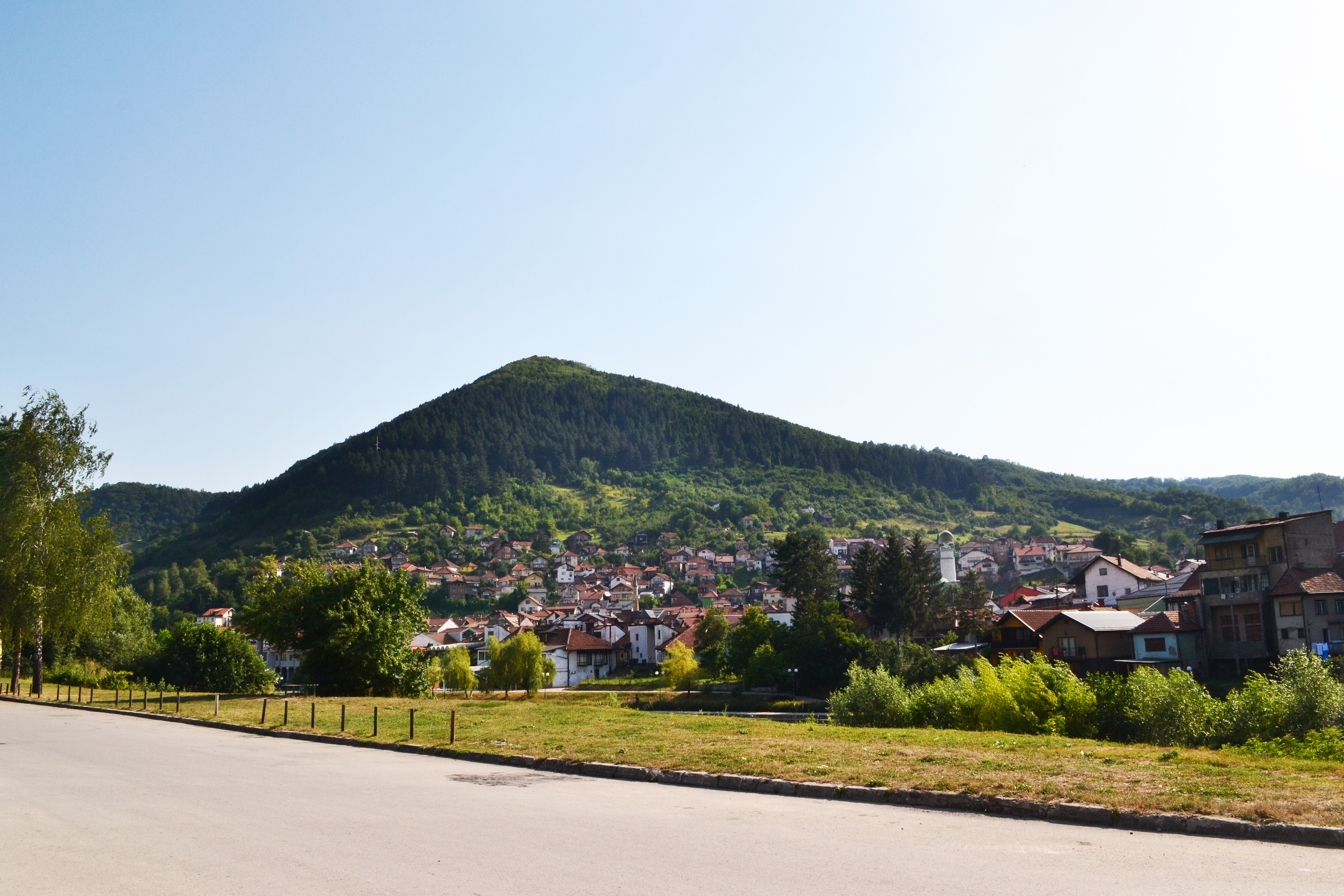
Visočica hill, in Visoko, Bosnia and Herzegovina (2013)

Visočica (pronounced [ʋi.sɔ̌.tʃi.tsa]; also known as Brdo Grad, pronounced [br̩̂dɔ ɡrâːd], "Hill Town") is a 213-metre-high hill in Bosnia and Herzegovina which is the site of the Old town of Visoki [ʋǐsɔkiː].

Since at least 2005, the hill has been the subject of a pseudoarchaeological belief that it is part of an ancient man-made pyramid complex. This notion is rejected by archaeologists and geologists.

== Old town of Visoki ==
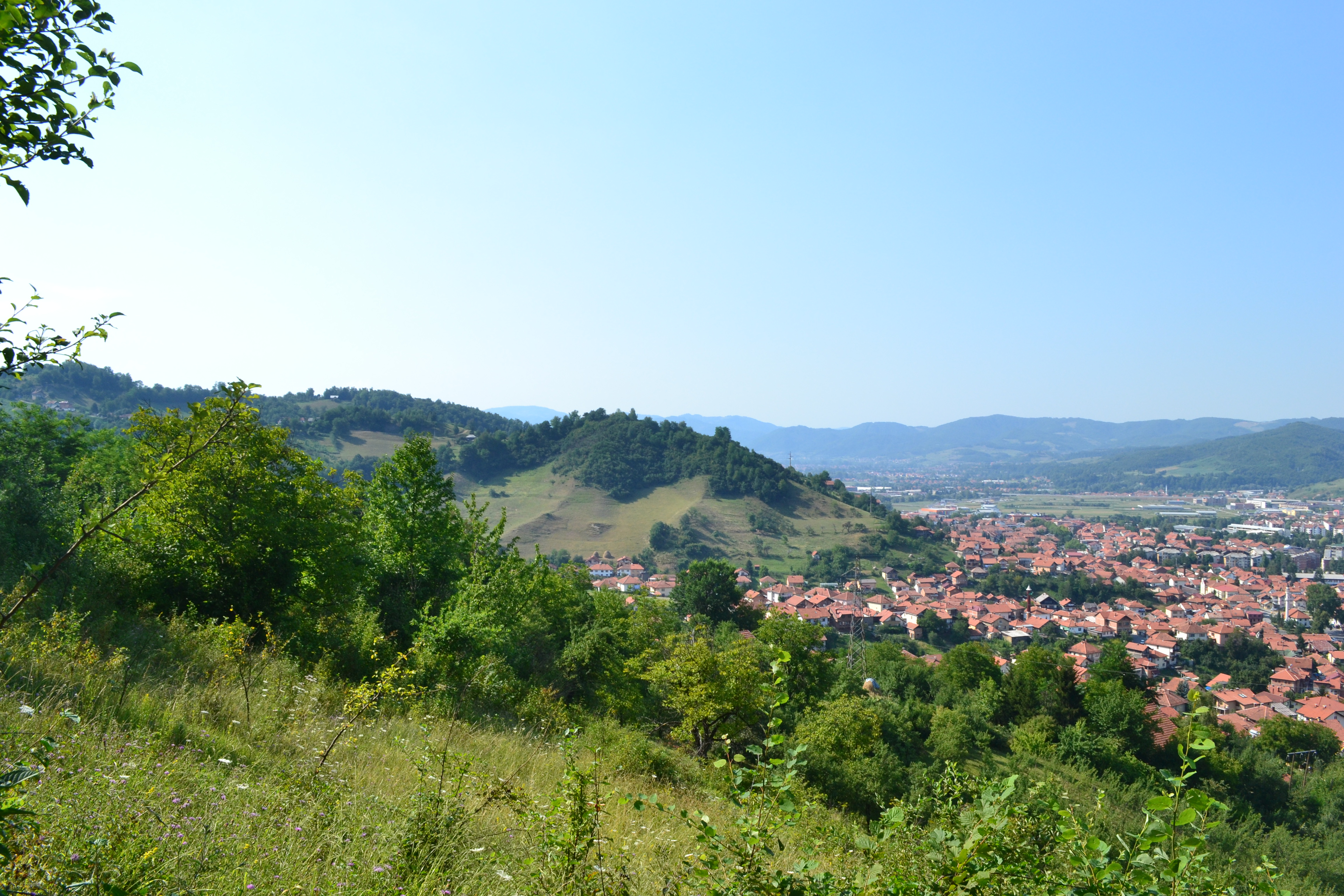
View of the town from the Visočica hill

The Old town of Visoki was a medieval royal castle town during the fourteenth century, located in Visoko, Bosnia and Herzegovina. The first mention of the town was on 1 September 1355, in the charter "in castro nosto Visoka vocatum" written by Tvrtko I of Bosnia while he was a young ban. The town appears to have been abandoned before 1503, as it is not mentioned in the Turkish-Hungarian treaty that was established that year. In the year 1626, Đorđić mentioned Visoki among abandoned towns.

== Pseudoscientific pyramid claims ==
Visočica hill came to international attention in October 2005, following a campaign to promote the scientifically unsupported idea that it is the largest of a group of ancient man-made pyramids. This idea originated with Houston-based expatriate Bosnian author and businessman Semir Osmanagić who has since turned the site into a tourist destination.

All scientific investigations have concluded that Visočica hill and the surrounding hills are natural geological formations known as a flatirons, and no scientific study has demonstrated the existence of man-made pyramids in Bosnia. Archaeologists have criticised the Bosnian authorities for supporting the pyramid claim saying, "This scheme is a cruel hoax on an unsuspecting public and has no place in the world of genuine science."

As of 2017, Osmanagić continues to run his project at Visočica, and to link the hill to long-standing non-scientific notions such as free energy and ancient astronauts.

== See also ==
- Historic documents written in Visoki
- Visoko
- Visoko during the Middle Ages
- History of Bosnia and Herzegovina
