= Vlachs (disambiguation) =

Vlach is a primarily a historical exonym used to refer to some groups of speakers of Eastern Romance languages in Southeastern Europe.

Vlachs or Vlach may also refer to:

- Cieszyn Vlachs, an ethnic group from Poland
- Moravian Vlachs, a historical ethnic group from Moravia
- Vlachs (social class), a social and fiscal class in late medieval and early modern Southeastern Europe
- Vlach (surname), a Czech surname
- Vlachs in medieval Bosnia and Herzegovina, a specific group of people in medieval Bosnia and Herzegovina
- Vlachs in medieval Serbia, a specific group of people in medieval Serbia
- Vlachs in the history of Croatia, a specific group of people in the history of Croatia
- Vlachs of Serbia, a Romanian-speaking ethnic group from Eastern Serbia

== See also ==
- Mitre the Vlach
- Morlachs
- Oláh (disambiguation)
- Statutes of the Vlachs
- Vlach law
- Vlach Quartet
- Vlah
- Ullah millet
- Wallach (disambiguation)
- Wallachia (disambiguation)
- Vlaški (disambiguation)
- Vlaška (disambiguation)
