= Wallich =

Wallich is a surname. Notable people with the surname include:

- Dorothea Juliana Wallich (1657–1725), German alchemist
- George Charles Wallich (1815–1899), British marine biologist and medical doctor; son of Nathaniel Wallich
- Henry Wallich (1914–1988), German American banker and economist
- Hermann Wallich (1833–1928), German Jewish banker; father of Paul Wallich
- Nathaniel Wallich (1786–1854), Danish botanist and surgeon; father of George Charles Wallich
  - Wallich's pheasant (a.k.a. cheer pheasant or Catreus wallichii), a bird species named after Nathaniel Wallich
- Paul Wallich (1882–1938), German banker; son of Hermann Wallich

== See also ==
- Wallach (disambiguation)
- Wallachia (disambiguation)
- Oláh (disambiguation)
- Volokh, an alternate spelling (East Slavic)
