= Wallachia (disambiguation) =

Wallachia is a historical and geographical region of Romania.

Wallachia or variants may also refer to:

- Kingdom of Wallachia, a fictional kingdom and tourism venture
- SS Wallachia, a cargo steamer

== See also ==
- Oláh (surname)
- Vlaška (disambiguation)
- Volokh (disambiguation)
- Walchia, a fossil plant genus
- Wallacea (disambiguation)
- Wallacia (disambiguation)
- Wallach (disambiguation)
- Wallachians (disambiguation)
  - Vlachs, speakers of Eastern Romance languages living in southeast Europe
- Wallack, a surname
- Wallich, an unrelated surname
- Night of Walachia, a fictional character in Melty Blood
- Banat, a geographical and historical region in the Pannonian Basin known earlier as Wallachia
  - Banat of Craiova, or Imperial Wallachia
- Great Vlachia, a region in Thessaly, Greece
- Little Wallachia, the name of several places
- Moldavia, rendered in several early references as Moldo-Wallachia and other forms
- Moravian Wallachia, a region in the eastern Czech Republic
- Morlachia, a region in modern Croatia
- Muntenia, Greater Wallachia, a historical region of Romania
- Oltenia, or Lesser Wallachia, a historical province and geographical region of Romania
- White Wallachia, territory corresponding to modern-day Bulgaria during the Asen dynasty
