= Olah =

Olah may refer to:

- Oláh, a Hungarian word that means Vlach in Romanian
- Olah (surname)
- Oláh (surname)
- Korban Olah, a burnt offering ritual in Judaism
- Olah reagent in chemistry, named after George Andrew Olah

== See also ==
- Wallach (disambiguation)
