= Wallack =

Wallack is a surname, and may refer to:

- Franz Wallack (1887–1966), Austrian civil engineer.
- James William Wallack (c. 1794–1864), English-American actor
- John Lester Wallack (1820–1888), American actor, son of James W.
- Henry John Wallack (1790–1870), British actor and stage manager
- Melisa Wallack, American screenwriter and film director
- Susan Wallack (née Johnston) (1793-1851), English-American actress

== See also ==
- Wallack's Theatre, name of several New York theatres
- Wallach (disambiguation)
- Wallachia (disambiguation)
- Oláh (disambiguation)
- Volokh (disambiguation), an alternate spelling (East Slavic)
