= Vlach (surname) =

Vlach (feminine Vlachová) is a Czech surname, a reference to Vlachs. Notable people with this surname include:

- Jaroslav Vlach (born 1992), Czech ice hockey player
- Josef Vlach, founder of the Vlach Quartet
- Karel Vlach (1911–1986), Czech dance orchestra conductor and arranger
- Martin Vlach (electrical engineer), American engineer
- Martin Vlach (pentathlete), Czech modern pentathlete
- Miroslav Vlach (1935–2001), Czech ice hockey player
- Renata Vlachová, Czech orienteer
- Roman Vlach (born 1989), Czech ice hockey player

== See also ==
- Vlah (disambiguation)
