= Martin Vlach =

Martin Vlach may refer to:

- Martin Vlach (electrical engineer)
- Martin Vlach (pentathlete)
