= Volok =

Volok may refer to:

- Volok (unit), a unit of land measurement
- Volok Reform, land reform in the 16th-century Grand Duchy of Lithuania

== People with the surname ==
- Bill Volok (1910–1991), American football player
- Ilia Volok (born 1965), Russian actor

== See also ==
- Voloka (disambiguation)
- Volokh
