= Vlaška =

Vlaška may refer to:

- Vlaška, Trebinje, a village in Bosnia and Herzegovina
- Vlaška, Ćuprija, a village in Serbia
- Vlaška, Mladenovac, a village near Mladenovac, Serbia
- Vlaška Street, a historical street in the center of Zagreb, Croatia
- Vlaška power plant, a former thermal plant in Raša, Istria bombed during World War II by the Partisans including Mate Blažina
- Vlaška limba (also vlåška), a name of the Istro-Romanian language
- Vlaška church, a Serbian Orthodox church near Cetinje, Montenegro

== See also ==
- Vlaška planina
- Vlașca (disambiguation)
- Wallachia (disambiguation)
- Vlach (disambiguation)
- Vlaško Polje
- Vlaški (disambiguation)
- Vlaškovo
- Vlaškovci
- Vlaškovec
- Vlašić (disambiguation)
