= Pârâul Mare =

- Location within Romania

Location
- Country: Romania
- Counties: Arad County
- Villages: Dorgoș

Physical characteristics
- Mouth: Mureș
  - location: Ususău
  - coordinates: 46.0874°N 21.8104°E
- Length: 18 km (11 mi)
- Basin size: 107 km^{2} (41 sq mi)

Basin features
- Progression: Mureș→ Tisza→ Danube→ Black Sea
- Tributaries
  - right: Niriș

The Pârâul Mare is a left tributary of the river Mureș in Romania. It discharges into the Mureș in Ususău. Its length is 18 km (11 mi) and its basin size is 107 km^{2} (41 sq mi).
