= Vlaški =

Vlaški may refer to:

- vlaški, one of the native names for the Istro-Romanian language
- vlaški, a name for the Aromanian language in North Macedonia
- vlaški, the Serbian name of the local variant of the Sârbă dance
- Alex Vlaški (born 1982), Serbian tennis player

== See also ==
- Vlaški Do (disambiguation)
- Vlaški Drenovac
- Vlaški opanci
- Vlaška (disambiguation)
- Vlach (disambiguation)
