= Wallach (disambiguation) =

Wallach or Vlach is a blanket term covering several modern Latin peoples descending from the Latinised population in Central, Eastern and Southeast Europe.

Wallach may also refer to:

- Wallach (crater), a small lunar impact crater
- 6670 Wallach, a main-belt asteroid
- Wallach IX, a fictional planet in Frank Herbert's science fiction universe of Dune
- Wallach Hall, a dormitory on the campus of Columbia University

== People with the surname ==
- Benjamin Wallach (1873–1935), South African cricketer
- Chad Wallach (born 1991), American baseball player
- Clarrie Wallach (1889-1918) and Neville Wallach (1896-1918), Australian rugby union players who were awarded the Military Cross during World War I
- Eli Wallach (1915–2014), American actor
- Evan Wallach, American judge, expert on war crimes
- Hanna Wallach (born 1979), computational social scientist
- Ira Wallach (writer) (1913–1995), American screenwriter and novelist
- Ira D. Wallach (1909–2007), American businessman and philanthropist
- Joe Wallach (1923–2026), American businessman, television broadcasting executive and author
- John Wallach (1943–2002), American journalist, author and editor
- Lori Wallach, director and founder of Global Trade Watch
- Maxim Litvinov or Max Wallach (1876–1951), Russian revolutionary and Soviet diplomat
- Moshe Wallach (1866–1957), German Jewish / Israeli physician
- Otto Wallach (1847–1931), German chemist, Nobel Prize winner
- Richard Wallach (1816–1881), American politician
- Steve Wallach (born 1945), American computer architecture engineer and company founder
- Theresa Wallach (1909-1999), motorcyclist, engineer, and author
- Tim Wallach (born 1957), American former baseball player
- Van Wallach (born 1947), American herpetologist
- William Douglas Wallach (1812–1871), American surveyor and newspaper entrepreneur
- Yochanan Vollach or Jochanan Wallach, (born 1945), Israeli former footballer
- Yona Wallach (1944–1985), Israeli poet
- Wallach brothers (1876–1900s) Australian family in rugby union and soldiers in World War I
- Ari Wallach, a futurist

== See also ==
- Wallach rearrangement, an organic reaction converting an azoxy compound to an azo compound
- Wallach reform, 16th century land reform in Lithuanian lands
- Walhaz, the Germanic root
- Walloons, the French-speaking population of Belgium, with a name also coming from Walhaz root
- Welsh people, an ethnic group and nation associated with Wales and the Welsh language, with a name also coming from Walhaz root
- Wallack, a term or name related to Wallach
- Wallich, an unrelated, but phonetically similar name
- Wallace (surname)
- Wallachia (disambiguation)
- Oláh (disambiguation)
- Volokh (disambiguation)
- French people, the descendants of the Gauls. The word Gaul may possibly have been from the Walhaz root
