= Vlah =

Vlah is a surname, a reference to Vlachs. Notable people with the surname include:

- Aleks Vlah (born 1997), Slovenian handball player
- Irina Vlah (born 1974), Moldovan politician
- Petru Vlah (born 1970), Moldovan politician

== See also ==
- Vlach (disambiguation)
- Stari Vlah, a region in Serbia
