= Vlașca =

Vlaşca may refer to the following places in Romania:

- Vlașca (river), a tributary of the Teslui in Oltenia
- Vlașca County, a former county in southern Muntenia
- Vlașca, a village part of the city of Fetești, eastern Muntenia
- Drăgănești-Vlașca, a commune in southern Muntenia
- Dărăști-Vlașca, a village in the commune of Adunații-Copăceni, southern Muntenia

== See also ==
- Vlaška (disambiguation)
