= Wallachians =

Wallachians could mean:

- Vlachs, Eastern Romance-speaking peoples of southeastern Europe
- Inhabitants of Wallachia, a region of Romania
- Inhabitants of Moravian Wallachia, a region in the eastern Czech Republic
