= Wallacia =

Wallachia (Walachia, Valachia, Valahia) is a historical and geographical region of Romania.

Wallacia may refer to:

- Wallacia, a trilobite genus, see Encrinuridae
- Wallacia, New South Wales, a suburb of Sydney in Australia
- Wallacia Mandi, a Mandaean temple under construction in Wallacia

== See also ==
- Wallacea, a group of islands mainly in Indonesia
- Wallasea Island, an island in Essex, England
