= Volokh =

Volokh may refer to:

- Ilia Volok (Ilia Volokh), Ukrainian actor
- Eugene Volokh (born 1968), Ukrainian-American legal scholar
  - The Volokh Conspiracy, a blog associated with Eugene Volokh

== See also ==
- Wallach
- Wallach (disambiguation)
- Oláh (disambiguation)
- Wallachia (disambiguation)
- Vlach, a blanket term covering several modern Latin peoples descending from the Latinised population in Central, Eastern and Southeastern Europe.
- Walhaz, the Germanic root for the word
