= Vlaški Do =

Vlaški Do may refer to the following villages in Serbia:

- Vlaški Do (Žabari)
- Vlaški Do (Smederevska Palanka)
