= Paul Wallich =

Paul Wallich (1882–1938) was a German banker and son of the banker Hermann Wallich, one of the founders of Deutsche Bank. An assimilated Jew, who considered himself Christian, he rose to become a partner in the bank Dreyfus & Co. Wallich was also a scholar and a book collector, with a collection of 30,000 volumes.

When the Nazis rose to power, Wallich and his bank were persecuted due to Jewish heritage. The bank was Aryanized, that is transferred to a non-Jewish owner, Merck Finck & Co., a Munich-based bank. He signed a 10-year consulting contract for 50,000 marks per year.

Wallich committed suicide in the aftermath of the Kristallnacht pogrom by drowning himself in the Rhine at Cologne.
