= Olah (surname) =

Olah is a surname, and may refer to:

- Adrian Olah (born 1981), Romanian footballer
- Alexandru Olah (born 1993), Romanian basketball player
- Chris Olah (born 1992/3), Canadian machine learning researcher
- Franz Olah (1910–2009), Austrian politician
- George Andrew Olah (1927–2017), Hungarian-American chemist
- Karin Olah (born 1977), American artist
- Nathalie Olah, British writer and cultural critic
- Tiberiu Olah (1928–2002), Hungarian-Romanian composer and musicologist

== See also ==
- Oláh (surname)
