= Wallacea (disambiguation) =

Wallacea is a designation for a group of mainly Indonesian islands.

Wallacea may also refer to:

- Wallacea (plant), a genus of flowering plant native to Colombia, Venezuela and northern Brazil
- Wallacea (beetle), genus of beetles belonging to the family Chrysomelidae

== See also ==
- Wallachia, a former principality and region of Romania
- Wallasea Island, an island in Essex, England
