= Hermann Wallich =

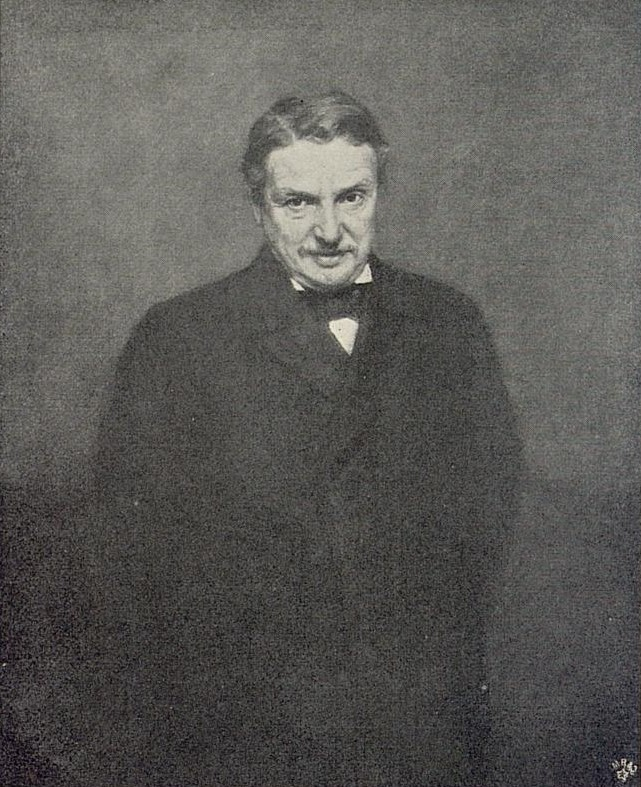
Konsul Wallich, painted by Max Koner, 1898

Hermann Wallich (December 28, 1833 – April 30, 1928) was a German Jewish banker. He was born in Bonn as the son of a skintrader.

Wallich completed a banking apprenticeship in Cologne, and then worked for 15 years for various French Banks, including as director of the Shanghai branch of the Comptoir d'Escompte. In 1870, he was appointed co-chairman of Deutsche Bank by Adelbert Delbrück and Ludwig Bamberger. Under his leadership and that of Georg von Siemens, Deutsche Bank became rapidly one of Germany's largest commercial banks. Among other things, it financed the establishment of many industrial conglomerates, such as BASF, Bayer, AEG, and Mannesmann.

Hermann Wallich married Anna Jacoby in 1875. The couple had a son, Paul Wallich (1882–1938), who also worked as a banker, and a daughter, Ilse. Wallich's grandson Henry Wallich emigrated to the United States and served as member on the Federal Reserve Board of Governors in the 1970s and 1980s. Hermann Wallich died in Berlin, aged 94.
