= Ususău =

- Commune
- Location in Romania
- Coordinates: 46°04′N 21°49′E
- Country: Romania
- County: Arad
- Population (2021-12-01): 1,415
- Time zone: UTC+02:00 (EET)
  - Summer (DST): UTC+03:00 (EEST)
- Vehicle reg.: AR

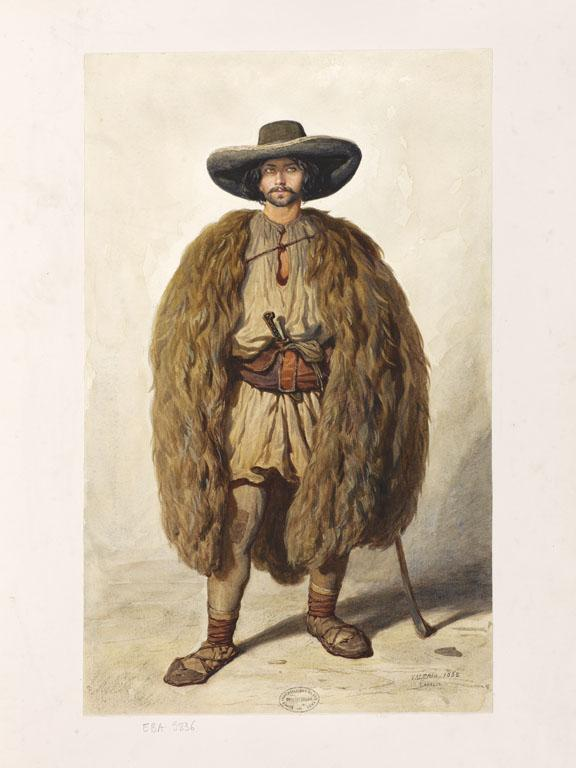
Théodore Valerio, Romanian shepherd from Zăbalț, 1852

Ususău (Hungarian: Marosaszó) is a commune in Arad County, Romania, situated in the couloir zone of the river Mureș, in the northern part of the Lipova Hills. The administrative territory of the commune is 13,543 hectares. It is composed of five villages: Bruznic (Marosborosznok), Dorgoș (Dorgos), Pătârș (Petercse), Ususău (situated at 43 km from Arad) and Zăbalț (Szabálcs). Until 2005, the commune was called Dorgoș and that village was the commune centre.

== Population ==
According to the 2002 census, the population of the commune was 1388 inhabitants, out of which 97.4% were ethnic Romanians, 0.4% Hungarians, 1.0% Roma, 0.9% Ukrainians and 0.3% of other or undeclared nationalities.

== History ==
The first documentary record of the locality Ususău dates back to 1418, Bruznic was first mentioned in 1437, Dorgoș in 1717, Pătârș in 1274, while Zăbalț in 1440.

== Economy ==
The economy of the commune is mainly agricultural, plantgrowing and livestock-breeding are well represented. Lumbering and conversion of timber are important activities among the inhabitants, the commune has a forestry stretching over 6500 ha.

== Tourism ==
Among the commune's sites are the palaeontological reservation (5 ha) in Zăbalț, the forestry reservation called Pădurea Măgura, the valley of the Mureș and the landscapes of the Lipova Hills.
