= Théodore Valerio =

French lithographer and painter (1819–1879)

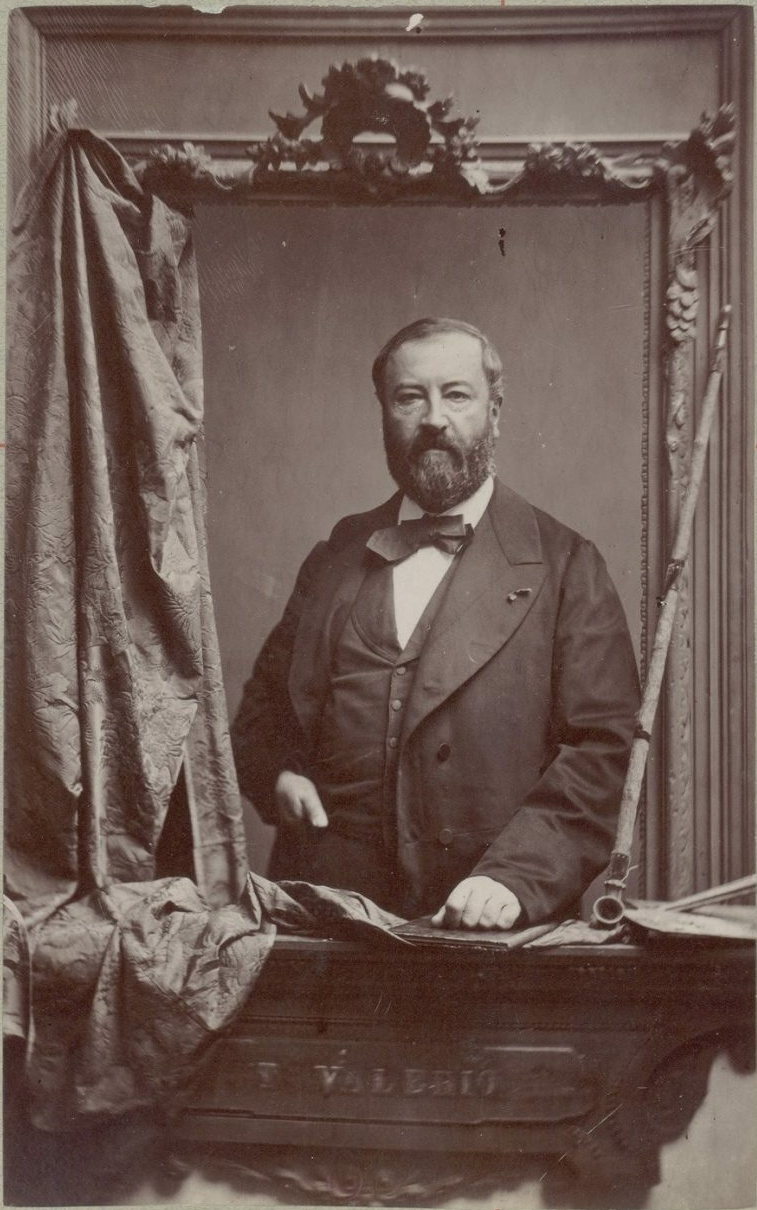
Portrait of Théodore Valério

Théodore Valerio (1819–1879) was a French artist who was born in Herserange (Meurthe-et-Moselle), France.

In addition to painting, he was a draughtsperson who produced engravings, woodcuts, and lithographs. His subjects included genre scenes and military imagery and ethnographic illustrations.

After studying with Nicolas-Toussaint Charlet, Valerio traveled throughout Europe, in particular Germany, Italy, the Balkans, Switzerland and Hungary where he lived for some time. Later he traveled to England where he lived in Brittany.

He fought with the Ottoman Turkish Army during the Crimean War. Following the end of the war, he received a bronze medal for his work in the Paris Salon in 1859. His work was largely forgotten, but was rediscovered in 1980.

== Collections ==
His work is held in the permanent collections of the Walters Art Museum, the National Gallery of Art, the Metropolitan Museum of Art, the Philadelphia Museum, the Louvre in Paris, among other venues.

== Gallery ==
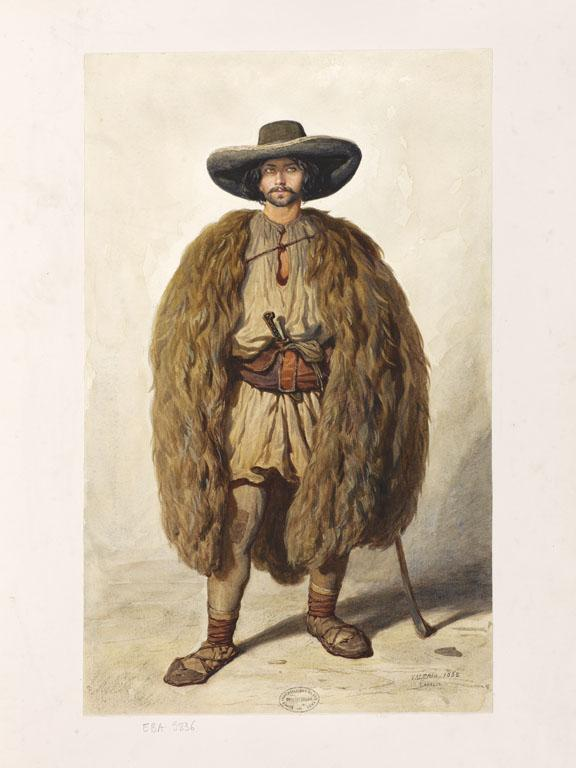
Théodore Valerio, Pâtre valaque de Zabalcz (Romanian shepherd from Zăbalț), 1852

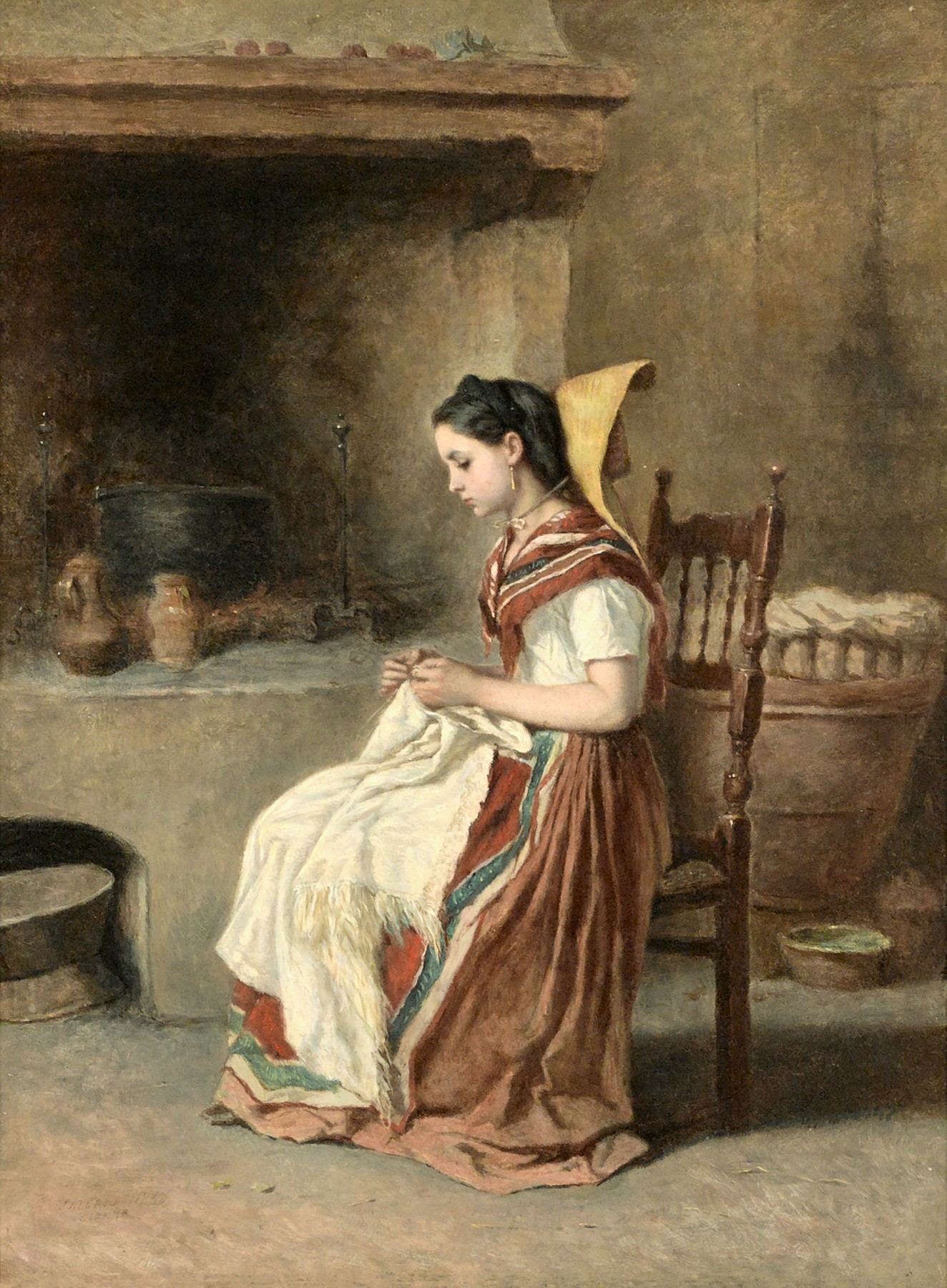
Théodore Valério, A girl sewing in the kitchen, 1860

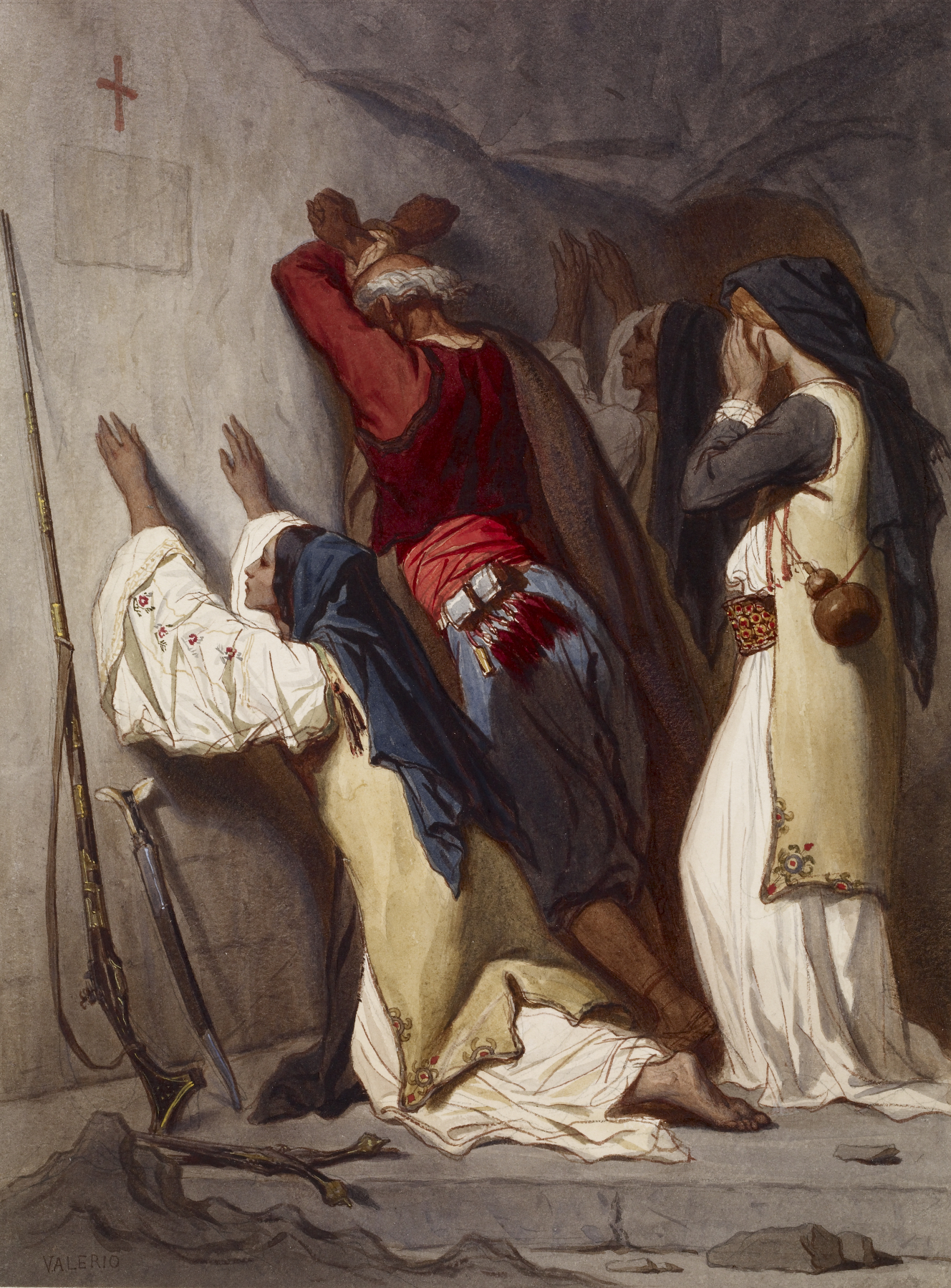
Théodore Valerio, Balkan Peasants Praying in Cave Chapel, 1875

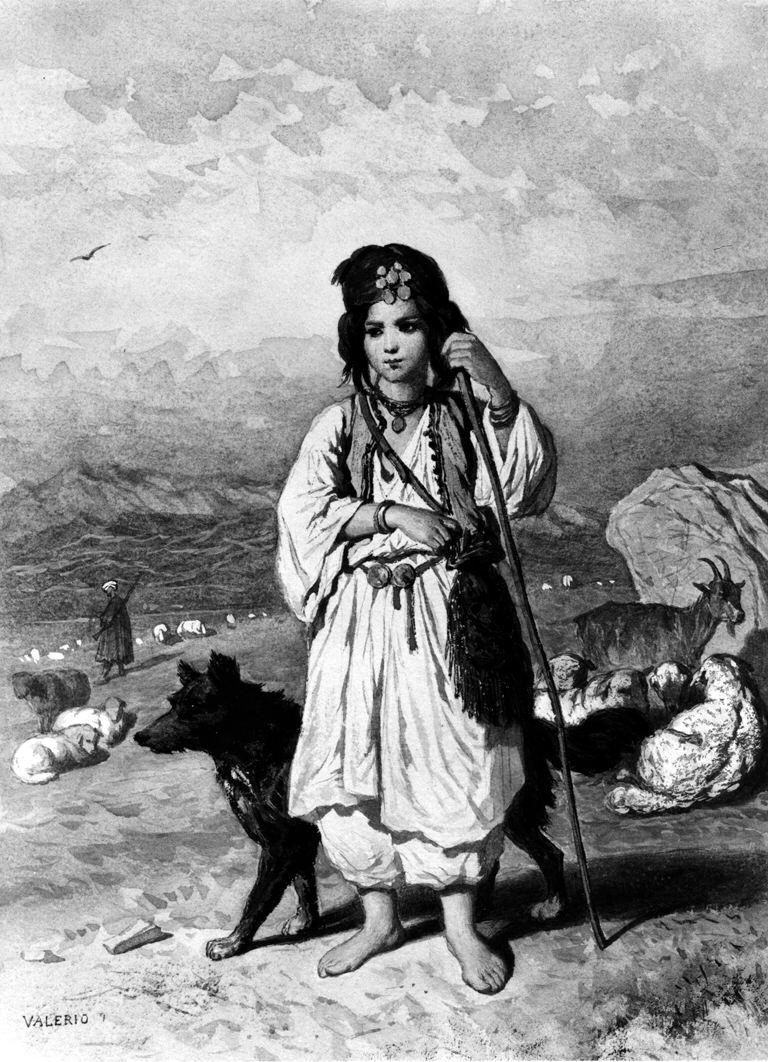
Théodore Valerio, Little Shepherdess and Flocks, c. 1867

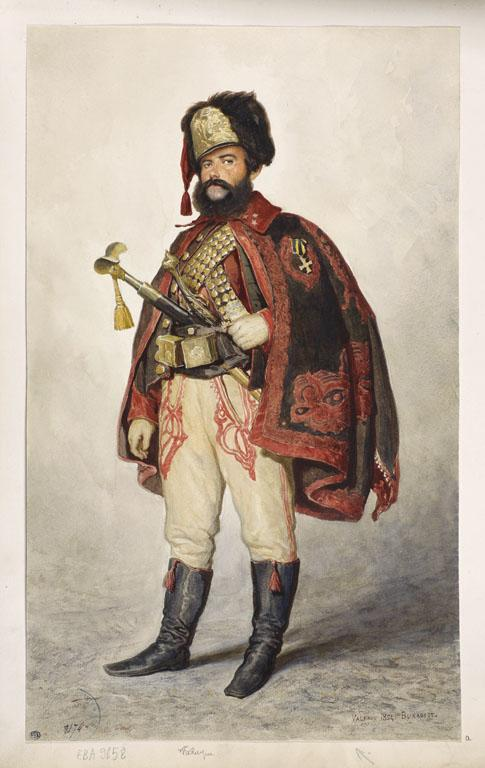
Théodore Valerio, Soldat de Bucarest, (Soldier from Bucharest), 1869

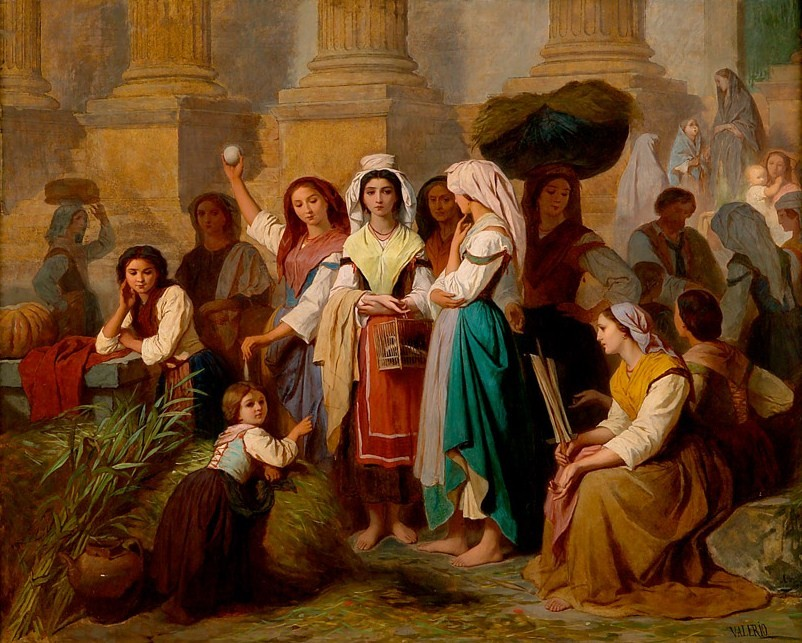
Théodore Valerio, The Herb Market in Assisi, date unknown
