= Martin Vlach (electrical engineer) =

Martin Vlach is an engineer at Mentor Graphics in Portland, Oregon. He was named a Fellow of the Institute of Electrical and Electronics Engineers (IEEE) in 2014 for his work in analog and mixed signal hardware description languages and their simulation tools.
