= Vlachs =

Romance-speaking populations in the Balkans

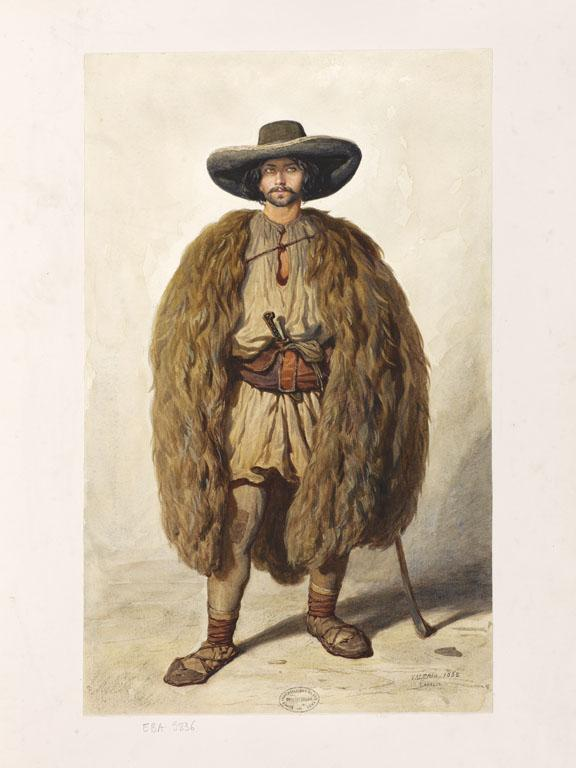
Théodore Valerio, 1852: Pâtre valaque de Zabalcz ('Wallachian Shepherd from Zăbalț')

Vlach (/vlɑːk, vlæk/ VLA(H)K), also Wallachian and many other variants, is a term and exonym used from the Middle Ages until the Modern Era to designate speakers of Eastern Romance languages living in Southeast Europe—south of the Danube (the Balkan peninsula) and north of the Danube.

Although it has also been used to name present-day Romanians, the term "Vlach" today refers primarily to speakers of the Eastern Romance languages - Aromanian, Megleno-Romanian, and Istro-Romanian - who live south of the Danube, in Albania, Bulgaria, northern Greece, North Macedonia and eastern Serbia. These people include the ethnic groups of the Aromanians, the Megleno-Romanians and, in Serbia, the Timok Vlachs. The term also became a synonym in the Balkans for the social category of shepherds, and was also used for non-Romance-speaking rural Christians (mostly Orthodox), in recent times in Dalmatia and Bosnia-Herzegovina derogatively. The term is also used to refer to the ethnographic group of Moravian Vlachs who speak a Slavic language but have Vlach origins, as well as for Morlachs and Istro-Romanians.

== Etymology ==
The word Vlach/Wallachian (and other variants such as Vlah, Valah, Valach, Voloh, Blac, Oláh, Vlas, Ilac, Ulah, etc.) is etymologically derived from the ethnonym of a Celtic tribe, adopted into Proto-Germanic *Walhaz, which meant 'stranger', from *Wolkā- (Caesar's Latin: Volcae, Strabo and Ptolemy's Greek: Ouolkai). Via Latin, in Gothic, as *walhs, the ethnonym took on the meaning 'foreigner' or 'Romance-speaker' and later "shepherd', 'nomad'. The term was adopted into Greek as Vláhoi or Blachoi (Βλάχοι), Albanian vllah, Slavic as Vlah (pl. Vlasi) or Voloh, Hungarian as oláh and olasz, etc. The root word was notably adopted in Germanic for Wales and Walloon, and in Switzerland for Romansh-speakers (German: Welsch), and in Poland Włochy or in Hungary olasz became an exonym for Italians. The Slovenian term Lahi has also been used to designate Italians. The same name is still used in Polish (Włochy, Włosi, włoskie) and Hungarian (Olasz, Olaszország) as an exonym for Italy, while in Slovak (Vlach - pl. Vlasi, Valach - pl. Valasi), Czech (Vlachy) and Slovenian (Laško, Láh, Láhinja, laško) it was replaced with the endonym Italia.

Other forms which were recognised by linguists to designate the "Vlachs" are: Blaci, Blauen, Blachi found in Western medieval sources, Balachi, Walati found in Western sources derived from medieval German, while the Germanic population from Transylvania used also the variants Woloch, Blôch. French sources used mostly Valaques while the medieval Song of Roland used Blos. In English and in modern German, the forms Wallachians, Walachen appear, respectively. In the Balkan Peninsula various names such as Rumer, Tzintzars, Morlachs, Maurovlachs, Armâns, Cincars, Koutzovlachs were used, while Muslim sources speak of Ulak, Ilak, Iflak.

== Historical uses ==
The term 'Vlach' first appeared in medieval sources and was generally used as an exonym for speakers of the Eastern Romance languages. Although later associated with transhumance across most Southeastern Europe, the early medieval Vlachs were agriculturists and pastoralists, and the practice of transhumant pastoralism only took hold between the 14th and the 19th centuries. Testimonies from the 13th and the 14th centuries show that, although in Europe and beyond, they were called Vlachs or Wallachians (oláh in Hungarian, Vláchoi (Βλάχοι) in Greek, Volóxi (Воло́хи) in Russian, Walachen in German, Valacchi in Italian, Valaques in French, Valacos in Spanish), the Romanians used the endonym rumân or român, from the Latin romānus, meaning 'Roman'. Aromanians use the endonym armãn (pl.: armãni) or rãmãn (pl.: rãmãni), from romānus. From Latin romānus are also the Albanian forms rëmen and rëmër, 'vlach'. Megleno-Romanians designate themselves with the Macedonian form Vla (pl.: Vlaš) in their own language.

In historical sources the term "Vlach" could also refer to Slovaks, Hungarians, Balkans, Transylvanians, Romanians, or even Albanians. In late Byzantine documents, the Vlachs are sometimes mentioned as Bulgaro-Albano-Vlachs (Bulgaralbanitoblahos), or Serbo-Albano-Bulgaro-Vlachs. According to the Serbian historian Sima Ćirković, the name "Vlach" in medieval sources had the same rank as the name "Greek", "Serb" or "Latin".

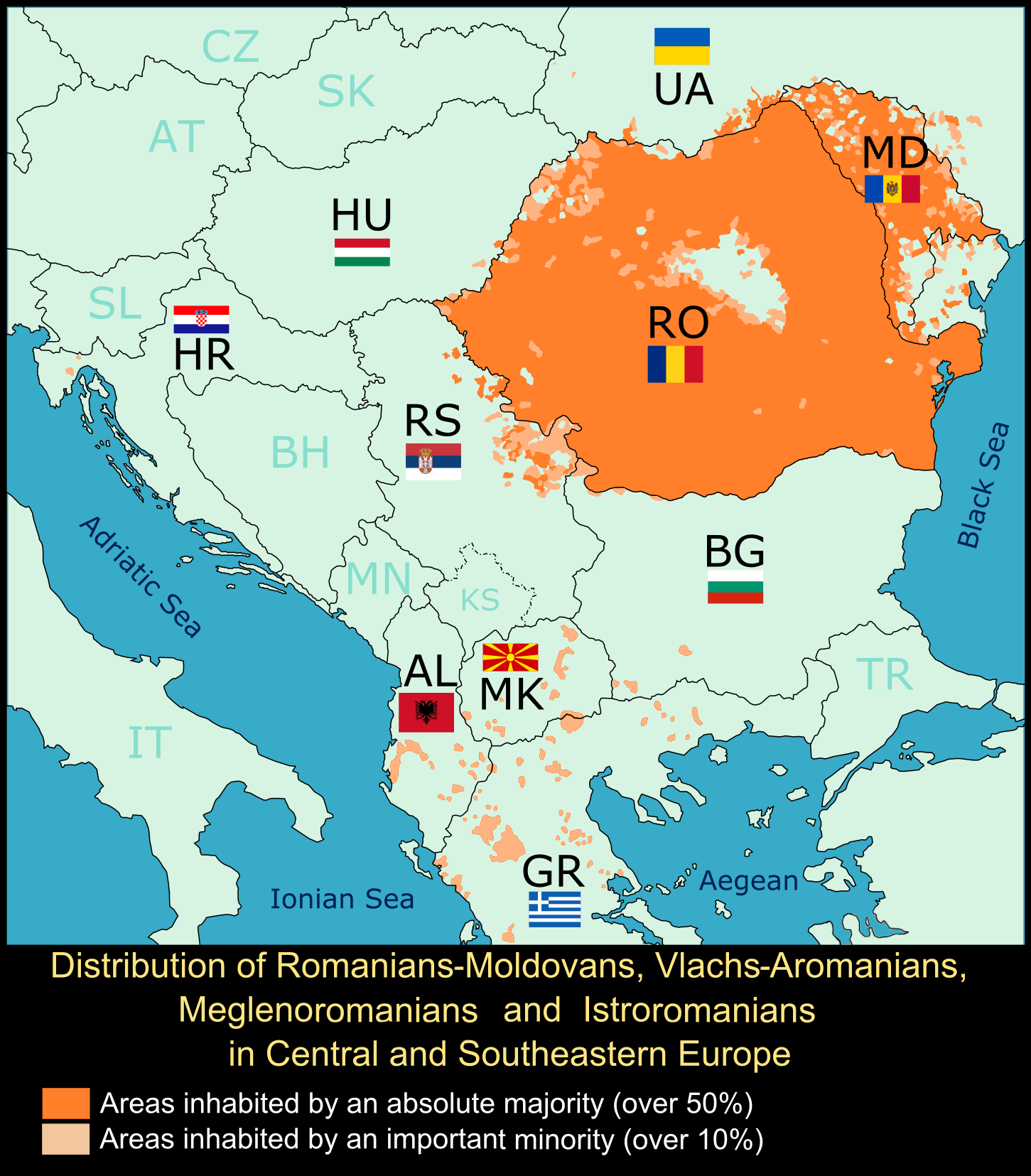
Map depicting the current distribution of Eastern Romance-speaking peoples

In the Western Balkans, during the High Middle Ages, the word also acquired a socio-economic component, being used as an internal name for the pastoral population in the medieval Kingdom of Serbia, one that was also often engaged in the transport of goods, colonisation of empty lands, and military service. It will then expand to local interpretations with religious, ethnic, and social status particularities across the wider region, being employed as a name for Eastern Romance speaking people, Eastern Orthodox population in opposition to Catholic population, for the rural population of the hinterlands, the Christian population in general as opposed to Muslim population, or a combination of these aspects. During the early history of the Ottoman Empire in the Balkans, there was a military class of Vlachs in Serbia and Ottoman Macedonia, made up of Christians who served as auxiliary forces and were exempted of certain taxes until the beginning of the 17th century. In this context, a large part of the Dalmatian hinterland was repopulated by Slavic settlers, both Orthodox and Catholic, speaking the Shtokavian dialect and called Vlach or Morlach by the inhabitants of the Dalmatian coast and islands. In these areas, the term Vlah evolved to Vlaj (pl. Vlaji) and is still used as a derogatory term to refer to the rural inhabitants of the hinterland, both Croats and Serbs, as "peasants" and "ignorants". In Istria, the ethnonym Vlach is used by the Chakavian-speaking Croatian inhabitants to refer to the Istro-Romanians and the Slavs who settled in the 15th and 16th centuries.

Nowadays, the term Vlachs (also known under other names, such as "Koutsovlachs", "Tsintsars", "Karagouni", "Chobani", "Vlasi", etc.) is used in scholarship for the Eastern Romance-speaking communities in the Balkans, especially those in Greece, Albania and North Macedonia. In Serbia the term Vlach (Serbian Vlah, plural Vlasi) is also used to refer to Romanian speakers, especially those living in eastern Serbia.

In modern Slovak, Valasi, other than denoting people of Vlachian ethnicity or origin, is synonymously and even more prominently used to describe shepherds, more commonly apprentice shepherds. The term originated following Vlachian arrival in mounts and hills of present-day Slovakia in 14th century and coinciding development in sheep herding and dairy industry. Further west, in the Czech Republic, the area of Moravian Wallachia is known as Valašsko and the inhabitants as Valaši, names usually translated in English as Wallachia and Wallachians, respectively.

== History ==
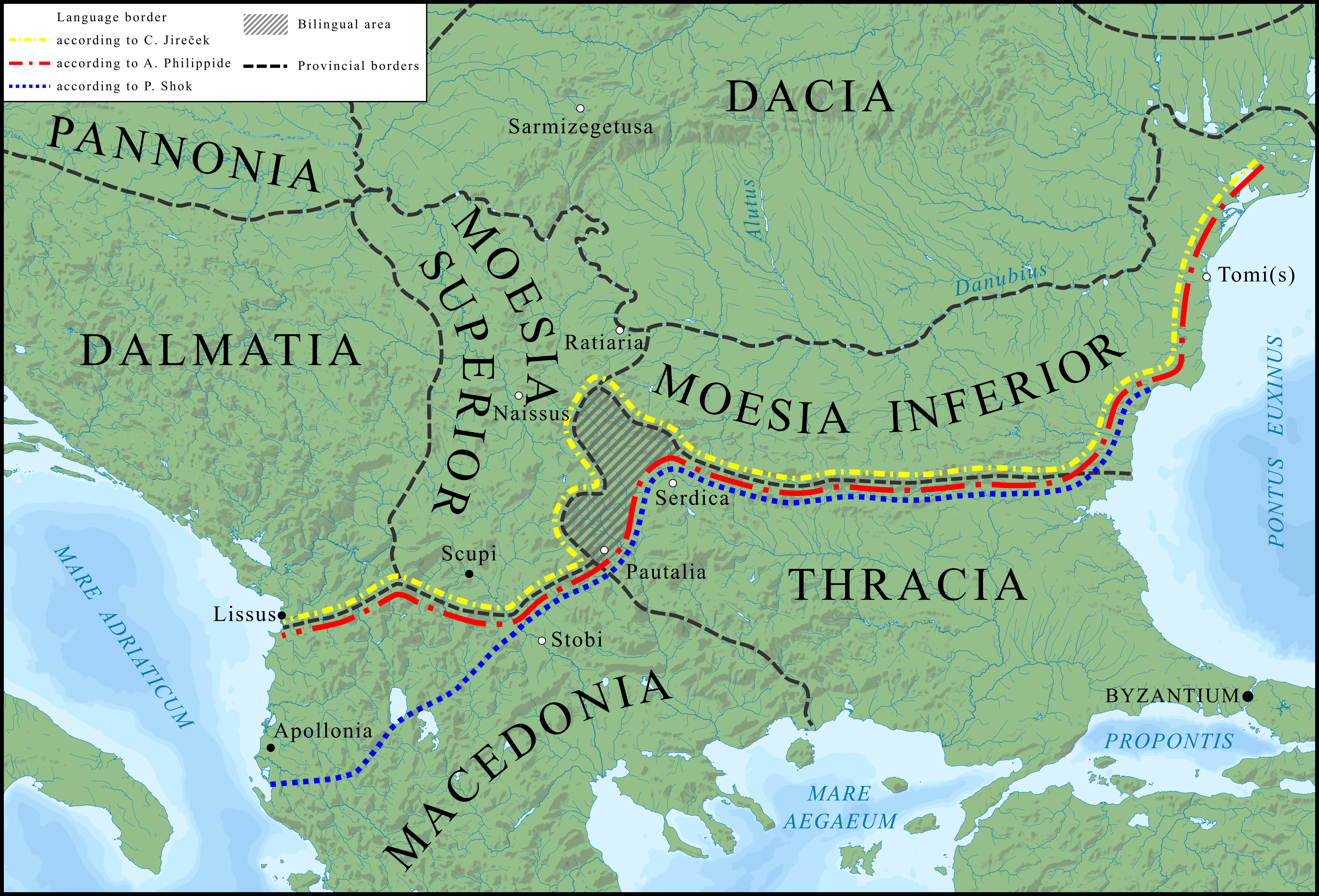
The Jireček Line between Latin- and Greek-language Roman inscriptions

According to the theory of Daco-Roman continuity, the ancestors of modern Vlachs and Romanians originated from Daco-Romans. For proponents of this theory, Eastern Romance languages prove the survival of the Thraco-Romans in the lower Danube basin during the Migration Period. On the other hand, the other theory states that the Romanians and the Vlachs, including the ancestors of present-day Aromanians, were originally part of the same group of speakers of Eastern Romance languages, and that their origins should be sought in the southern Balkans (Thraco-Roman and Illyro-Roman populations). Early Romanian-speakers would have then moved northwards from the 12th century onwards.

=== 10th century ===
During the Middle Ages, the term "Magna Vlachia" appears in Byzantine documents. This name was used for Thessaly and present-day North Macedonia.

John Skylitzes mentioned that in 976 Vlachs fought with and killed David of Bulgaria, somewhere between Prespa and Kastoria. A latter addition to the text by Skylitzes Continuatus names the Vlachs as "hoditōn", a word that was associated by historians with the Serbian "kjelatori": guides and guards of caravans in the Balkans.

Ibn al-Nadīm published in 998 the work Kitāb al-Fihrist mentioning "Turks, Bulgars and Blaghā". According to B. Dodge the ethnonym Blaghā could refer to Wallachians/Romanians. The original Arabic text does not contain the word "Blaghā" but rather "البلغار," which translates to "al-Bulghār," the term used in contemporary Arabic texts to refer to Volga Bulgaria. The new Arabic edition also features the word "al-Bulghār" ("البلغار") instead of "Blaghā." Furthermore, the first critical edition edited by Gustav Flügel in 1871, which includes the original Arabic text, likewise uses the designation "البلغار" ("al-Bulghār"). The word "البلغار" ("al-Bulghār") appears instead of "البلغم" ("al-Blagham") in both the 1971/1973/1988 Tehran/Beirut/Cairo critical editions as well. Thus, Bayard's translation is incorrect, as he mistakenly read "البلغار" ("al-Bulghār") as "البلغم" ("al-Blagham"). Therefore, the original Arabic text refers to Volga Bulgaria, not the Vlachs.

Mutahhar al-Maqdisi, "They say that in the Turkic neighbourhood there are the Khazars, Russians, Slavs, Waladj, Alans, Greeks and many other peoples." According to other non-Romanian historians, based on the context, the "Waladj" are not the Vlachs, but a people living around the Volga.

=== 11th century ===
Vlachs were present in large numbers, on the Chalcidice peninsula around 1000, according to monastic documents from Mount Athos. On the peninsula, the Vlachs were famous for their cheese and meat products. In these texts sometimes they are called "Vlachorynhinii", which may be a mixture of the name "Vlach" and "Rynhini" a Slavic tribe who settled in the same area in the 7th century.

In 1013, a Byzantine document mentions the settlement of "Kimbalongu" in the mountains near Strumitsa, which was a Vlach settlement.

The names Blakumen or Blökumenn is mentioned in Nordic sagas dating between the 11th and 13th centuries, with respect to events that took place in either 1018 or 1019 somewhere at the northwestern part of the Black Sea and believed by some to be related to the Vlachs. Omeljan Pritsak, however, point out that the texts probably refer to a nomadic Turkic people, since the "Blakumen" in the texts are "non-christian heathens" and nomadic horsemans. Spinei contrasts Pritsak's view by claiming that there are several mentions of the Blakumen or Blökumen in contexts taking place decades before the earliest appearance of the Cumans in the Pontic steppe, and that translating the name to "Black Cumans" is not concordant with the Varangian ethnic terminology.

In 1020, the Archdiocese of Ohrid was founded, which was responsible for "the spiritual care of all the Vlachs".

In 1022, Vlach shepherds from Thessaly and the Pindus mountains provided cheese for Constantinople.

In 1025, the Annales Barenses mentions a people called "Vlach" who live near the river Axios.

The same chronicle the Annales Barenses describes that in 1027 the Byzantine army led by Orestes that tried to recapture Sicily from the Arabs, also included many Vlachs recruited from Macedonia.

Kekaumenos writes in his Strategikon (1075–1078) about the revolt in 1066 in the region of Thessaly under the protospatharios Nikoulitzas Delphinas, nephew of the homonymous 10th century military commander, and father in law of the writer. He writes about a leader, Nikulitsa, who is given command by Basil II over the Vlachs in Hellas theme. Nikulitsa switched alliance to Samuel of Bulgaria after the conquest of Larissa by the Bulgarian Tsar. The Vlachs of Larissa met with Nikoulitzas Delphinas in the house of one of their leaders named Beriboes to discuss their decision to revolt. The Vlachs already sent their families (women and children) and livestock to the mountains of Bulgaria. Delphinas convinced them to postpone their actions until they harvest the fields. Kekaumenos mentions the herds of the Vlachs and their household spend the months of April to September beyond Thessaly, in the high mountains of Bulgaria, where it is very cold. (it is clear from the text that we are talking about the mountains of today's North Macedonia). The same text describes that the homeland of the Vlachs is Thessaly, precisely the part of the region divided by the river Pleres. According to Kekaumenos, the Vlachs were Dacians and Bessi, who lived near and south from the Danube and the Sava, where the Serbs live now. They feigned loyalty to the Romans while they were constantly attacked and pillaged, therefore, Trajan launched a war, their leader, Decebalus was also killed, and then the Vlachs were scattered in Macedonia, Epirus and Hellas. According to Hungarian historians, Kekaumenos made the Dacians the ancestors of the Vlachs because he knew about the deceitfulness of the Dacians against the Romans, and according to him the Dacians and Vlachs had a perfectly matching nature, treachery and political unreliability, so much that in his opinion they should not be believed even if the Vlachs take an oath. Kekaumenos arbitrarily identified the Vlachs with the Dacians according to the archaizing efforts of his time, because the tendency to refer to later peoples with classical names was common in Byzantium at the time of Kekaumenos. Kekaumenos also confused the Roman province Dacia Traiana with Dacia Aureliana, and even he placed it further west where it actually was, that is why he mentioned the Serbian territory as the homeland, the Bessus tribe was a neighbor of the Roman province Macedonia. According to Florin Curta, the interpretation of Vlachs being nomadic shepherds by Hungarian and/or Neo-Roeslerian historians is due to the desire to demonstrate that Romanian ethnogenesis took place south of the Danube, that Vlachs and Romanians are (or were at least) the same people, and their current distribution is the result of nomadic movement to Transylvania and the surrounding regions after the establishment of the Kingdom of Hungary. Curta adds that the mention in Strategikon cannot be used to support the idea of transhumant pastoralism, the closer analogy for the agricultural practice of Vlachs being Alpine transhumance: Vlach men going to the mountain pastures with the herds in the summer while the rest of their families remained in their lowland villages.

Alexius Komnenos mentions that in 1082 he passed through a Vlach settlement called Exeva in Macedonia.

Anna Komnene mentions in her Alexiad that in 1091 Emperor Alexios ordered Nikephoros Melissenos to raise an army against invading Pechenegs. Melissenos recruited, among others, Bulgarians and "the nomadic tribes called Vlachs in popular parlance".

According to the Alexiad, in 1094–1095, Emperor Alexius Komnenos was notified by a Vlach chieftain called Poudila about the crossing of the Danube by a Cuman army, and that to prepare himself for the attack, then the Vlachs likewise led the Cumans through the gorges of the Balkan Mountains.

In 1099, crusading armies were attacked by Vlachs, in the mountains along the road from Braničevo to Naissus.

=== 12th century ===
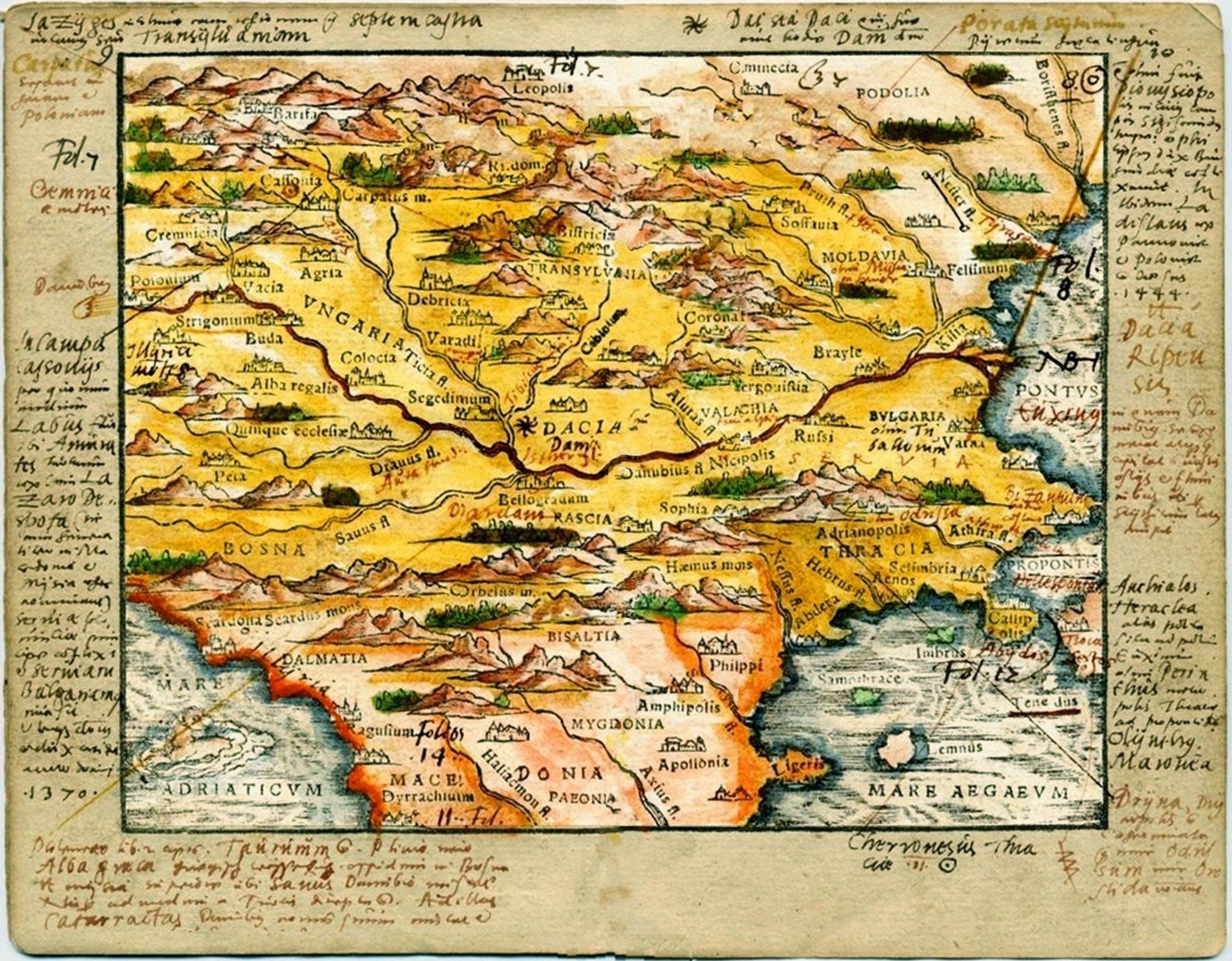
Map of Central-Southern Europe during the late Middle Ages/early Modern period by Transylvanian Saxon humanist Johannes Honterus

300 Vlach families are mentioned as servants of the Monastic community of Mount Athos in a correspondence between Emperor Alexios I Komnenos and Patriarch Nicholas III Kyrdiniates, sometime between 1105 and 1109. The patriarch complained that use of the mountains as pasture and the habit of employing women also as shepherds went against the rules of the monastic community. As a consequence, the Vlachs were expelled from their villages and from the area. According to Földes János, the Vlachs were re-settled in the Peloponnese.

The Primary Chronicle, written c. 1113 states that the Slavs settled beside the Danube, then the Volochi people attacked the Slavs, settled among them and did them violence, leading to the Slavs departing and settling around the Vistula under the name of Leshi. According to the chronicle the Slavs settled there first, and the Volochi seized the territory of the Slavs; later, the Hungarians drove the Volochi away, took their land and settled among the Slavs. The Primary Chronicle thus contains a possible reference to Romanians. Other non-Romanian historians consider the Volochi the Franks, as their country is placed west to Baltic Sea and near England by the author of the work, Nestor the Chronicler. The Frankish Empire stretched from the North Sea to the Danube.

The Byzantine princess and scholar Anna Komnene, in her book Alexiad, mentions a Vlach settlement called Ezeba, which was near Larissa and Androneia. In the same work she also describes the Vlachs as "the nomadic tribes, called Vlachs in popular parlance".

Traveler Benjamin of Tudela (1130–1173) of the Kingdom of Navarre was one of the first writers to use the word Vlachs for a Romance-speaking population. In his work he mentions that these Vlachs live high up in the mountains of Thessaly, and from there they sometimes come down to plunder, which they do quickly, as swift as deer, for which reasons there is no king to rule them.

In 1167, Vlachs living by the border of the Principality of Halych during the reign of Yaroslav Osmomysl, captured Andronicus and returned him to Emperor Manuel.

Byzantine historian John Kinnamos described Leon Vatatzes' military expedition along the northern Danube, where Vatatzes mentioned the participation of Vlachs in battles with the Magyars (Hungarians) in 1167. John Kinnamos says Vlachs were "colonists brought from Italy". Historian Florin Curta hypothesizes that the Italian origin of Vlachs was an editorial addition of Kinnamos aimed to justify the claim of taking back the old Roman lands north of the Danube, part of the Kingdom of Hungary.

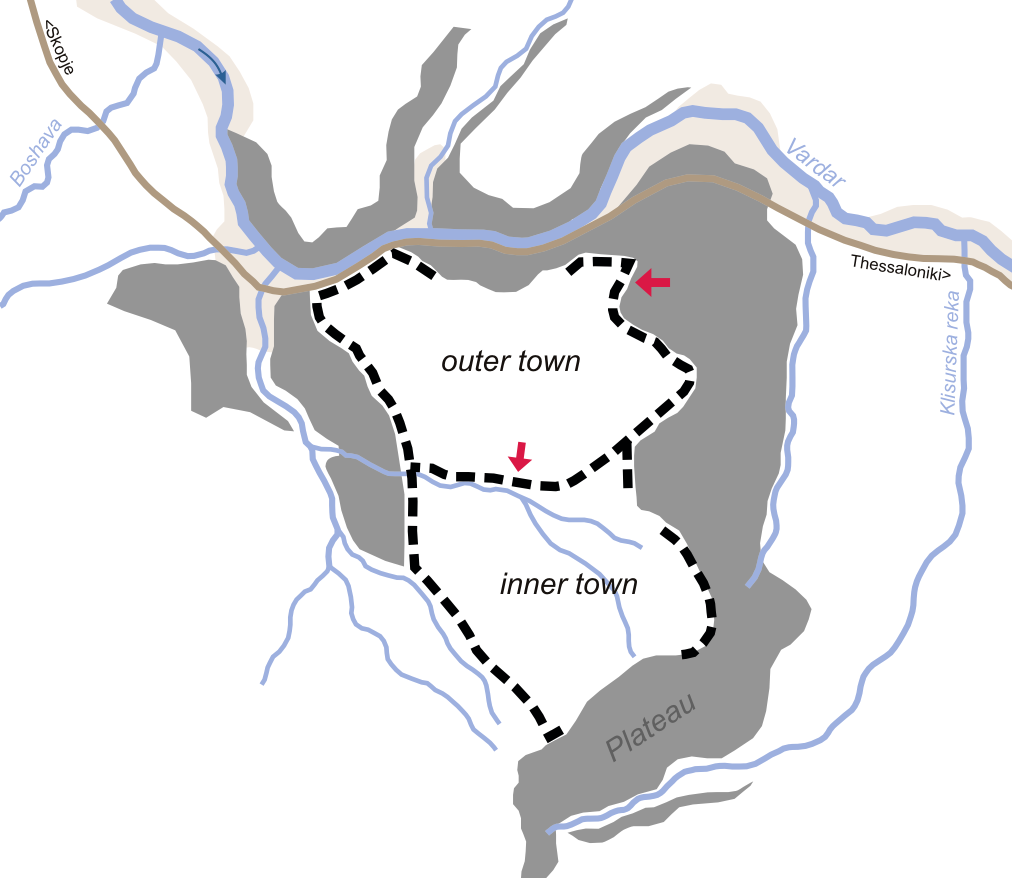
Plan of the fortress Prosek, seat of Dobromir Chrysos

The uprising of brothers Asen and Peter was a revolt of Bulgarians and Vlachs living in the theme of Paristrion of the Byzantine Empire, caused by a tax increase. It began on 26 October 1185, the feast day of St. Demetrius of Thessaloniki, and ended with the creation of the Second Bulgarian Empire, also known in its early history as the Empire of Bulgarians and Vlachs.

According to Niketas Choniates, after the Byzantine Emperor Isaac II Angelos lost his wife, he wanted to marry the daughter of Bela III of Hungary, but there was not enough money for the wedding, so he imposed taxes in the regions and cities of the empire, but he angered the "barbarians who dwelt in the Haemos mountains, who were once called Moesians, but are now called Vlachs".

Mentions of Vlachs in Medieval Bulgaria also come from Niketas Choniates who writes about a Vlach called Dobromir Chrysos who established an autonomous polity in the upper region of Vardar river and Moglena. A similar event is recorded by the same author in the area of Philippopolis where a Vlach called Ivanko, formerly a boyar at the Asen brothers' court was given military command by Emperor Isaac and expanded his rule to Smolyan, Mosynopolis, and Xanthi.

According to Niketas Choniates, Thessaly and Macedonia is called "Magna Vlachia", Aetolia and Acarnata are called "Little Vlachia" and north-eastern Epirus is called "Upper Vlachia".

In 1183 Hungarian documents mention, that King Béla III of Hungary, in his campaign against the Byzantine Empire, sacked Sofia, and among the defenders there were many Vlachs. The King used the opportunity and "... took home a number of these valiant mountain soldiers, and settled them in the Szeben County."

Sometime between 1183 and 1185 the first mention of Vlachs living in the theme of Moglena, in a charter kept in the archive of the monastery Great Lavra on Mount Athos. According to this, Emperor Andronikos I Komnenos replies to the monks of the monastery's complaint that Vlachs on their domain are not paying taxes and are inciting other inhabitants of Moglena region, such as Bulgarians and Cumans, to rebel and declare themselves independent from the Great Lavra. The document contains some of the first Romanian names, such as Stan, Radu cel Şchiop, and Peducel.

A Byzantine church document mentions that in 1190, "the Cumans and the Vlachs take the relics of Saint Ryli from Sofia to Tirnovo with a great pomp."

According to the Chronicle of the Priest of Duklja, the authenticity of which is highly disputed by historians, c. 600 AD the Avars conquered Salona, then, attacking further south, ravaged Macedonia and the "land of the black Latins, now called Morvlachs".

The first mention of Vlachs in Serbian medieval chronicles is dated from the time of Stefan Nemanjić, most probably 1198–1199, and it is related to a donation act towards restoration of Hilandar monastery with aid from the inhabitants of the area of Prizren.

The History of the Expedition of the Emperor Frederick mention the Vlachs as people living in the mountains and forests of the Balkans. The chronicle also describes the Vlachs' homeland as being near Thessaloniki. The chronicle describes how the Crusaders captured several Vlachs who told them that the Vlachs live in Macedonia, Thessaly and Bulgaria, and that because they were heavily taxed, they were rebelling.

Numerous Serbian documents from the very end of the 12th century speak of Vlach shepherds in the mountains between the Drina and the Morava.

=== 13th century ===
In the Nibelungenlied, written around the year 1200, appears a certain Duke Ramunc of Wallachia (Herzog Ramunc aus dem Walachenland) among Attila's guests at his wedding with Kriemhild; in another passage, the Vlachs (Wlâchen) are mentioned as well. Romanian historians claim the name of this fictional character could be derived from the Romanian ethnonym itself. According to Pop, the author's anachronistic view that Vlachs were contemporaries with Attila stems from oral tradition noting that Hungarians encountered Vlachs upon arriving in Pannonia. Since Huns were seen as their ancestors, Vlachs were retrospectively placed as Attila’s contemporaries. However, the environment described there is from the 9th-12th centuries. The presence of the Russians, Pechenegs, Poles and Hungarians as contemporary with Attila confirms that.

According to the medieval Hungarian chronicle, the Gesta Hungarorum ("The deeds of the Hungarians"), written in the early 13th century, when the Hungarians of Grand Prince Árpád conquered the Carpathian Basin, at that time Slavs, Bulgarians and Blachij, and also the shepherds of the Romans (sclauij, Bulgarij et Blachij, ac pastores romanorum) inhabited Pannonia. Most researchers say that the Blachij are the Vlachs, some Hungarian scholars claim that they are the Bulaqs, a Turkic people. László Makkai writes that "this hypothesis does not bear the test of scholarly scrutiny". The chronicle's authenticity is in question in historiography, because it confuses the peoples living in the area in the 12th century and the peoples of the 9th century. Among others, it includes the Cumans in Transylvania, who arrived only centuries later. Romanian historian Ioan-Aurel Pop states that some exaggerations and inaccuracies, typical of a chronicle at the time and mostly in favour of the Royal House, are not a sufficient reason to discredit the entire document as a historical source. However, the chronicle mentions many rulers, but none of them is mentioned in any other contemporary chronicle. According to Romanian historian Florin Curta and leading Romanian medievalist Radu Popa, during the 1960–1989 period, the archaeological evidences were manipulated to meet the demands of the nationalist policies of the Ceaușescu's regime, and Romanian archaeologists made every possible attempt to prove that the Gesta Hungarorum is a reliable source for the Romanian presence in Transylvania prior to the Hungarian conquest, however no archaeological evidence was found to prove the subject. Hungarian archaeologist István Bóna also accused Romanian archaeologists of hiding evidence that did not fit their interpretation regarding the Gesta Hungarorum during the excavation of the early medieval hillfort at Dăbâca as Gelou's capital city. Whether archeology supports the Gesta or not is disputed among historians. British-Romanian historian Dennis Deletant states the analysis of the Gesta Hungarorum shows that is too naive to claim it is an immaculate source, just as it is foolhardy to totally discredit its reliability, and the conclusion, the cases for and against the existence of Gelou and the Vlachs simply cannot be proven. British historian Carlile Aylmer Macartney writes in his critical and analytical guide of Anonymus that all Romanian historians refer to Anonymus, but they are not credible in the subject and the chronicle is not evidence for presence of Vlachs in Transylvania. Madgearu attempts to prove that a Vlach-Slav population existed in Transylvania before the arrival of the Hungarians by recounting place names of Slavic origin he believes weren't adopted to Romanian via Hungarian.

Kaloyan was given the title imperator Caloihannes dominus omnium Bulgarorum atque Blachorum ("Emperor Kaloyan, Lord of All Bulgarians and Vlachs") by Patriarch Basil I of Bulgaria and the title Rex Bulgarorum et Blachorum ("King of the Bulgarians and the Vlachs") by Pope Innocent II.

In 1204 and 1205 Raimbaut de Vaqueiras mentions the Vlachs as enemies of Boniface of Montferrat.

After 1207 Geoffrey of Villehardouin mentions twelve times the Vlachs part of the armies of Kaloyan of Bulgaria, either as defenders against Henry of Flanders or among the attackers of Adrianopole.

Around the same time Henry of Valenciennes writes in his History of Emperor Henry of Constantinople about the country he calls Blaquie ruled by Burile (Borilă). Henry of Flanders conquers this land and awards it to Burile's cousin Esclas (Slav). From there on the country will be known as Blakie la Grant (Great Valachia).

Sándor Timaru-Kast alleges that the Venetian Chronicle refers to the land that would become Wallachia as "Black Cumania", "the colony of black Vlachs who migrated northwards".

In 1213, an army of Vlachs, Saxons and Pechenegs, led by the Count of Sibiu, Joachim Türje, attacked the Second Bulgarian Empire – Bulgarians and Cumans in the fortress of Vidin. After this, all Hungarian battles in the Carpathian region were supported by Romance-speaking soldiers from Transylvania.

Robert de Clari narrates in his Conquest of Constantinople, written sometime after the death of Henry of Flanders, about the Emperor's conflict with Kaloyan of Bulgaria - named Jehans li Blakis in his work, and calls Kaloyan's country Blakie.

Stefan the First-Crowned donates 200 families of Vlachs from Prokletije and Peći to Žiča monastery.

In 1220, king Stefan the First-Crowned proclaimed that all Vlachs of his kingdom belonged to the Eparchy of Žiča.

A royal chancellery document from 1223, connected to the foundation of the Cistercian abbey at Cârța around 1202, which was granted land, mentions it was built in the land of the Vlachs/Romanians. This is also the first mention of the Vlachs in Hungarian documents.

In the Diploma Andreanum issued by King Andrew II of Hungary in 1224, "silva blacorum et bissenorum" was given to the Saxon settlers.

The Orthodox Vlachs spread further northward along the Carpathians to the present-day territory of Poland, Slovakia, and the Czech Republic, and were granted autonomy under the "Vlach law".

In 1230 Constantine Akropolites, in his writing about the conquests of Bulgarian Tsar Ivan Asen, notes that the "Magna Vlachia" is next to Albania.

Pope Gregory IX wrote several letters to the Hungarian royalty regarding the ecclesiastical organization of the Cuman Bishopric in regions of present-day Romania. In a letter from 1234, he addressed Prince Béla regarding the Vlachs (Walathi), who were bypassing local Catholic diocese to receive sacraments from Orthodox "pseudo-bishops." The Pope expressed particular concern that Catholic Hungarians and Germans were migrating into these areas and integrating with the Vlachs, forming "one people" and adopting their rites. To halt this, Gregory IX exalted the Prince to "compel the said Vlachs to receive the bishop whom the Church granted them" and requested that Béla "assign to him sufficient and honorable revenues" from the taxes collected from the Vlach population.

Giovanni da Pian del Carpine mentions in 1247, when returning from his mission to the Mongol Khan, a "Rus" prince by the name Olaha east of the Carpathian Mountains. Historians Victor Spinei and Nikolai Russev consider it a reference to a Vlach community of Orthodox faith.

In 1247, Béla IV of Hungary gives the "Land of Severin" to the Knights Hospitallers with two polities (kenezatus of John and Farkas), except kenezatus of voivode Litovoi which was left to the Vlachs as they held it. The land of Hateg is excepted, while the voivodate of Seneslaus the king keeps for himself.

In 1252 King Béla IV of Hungary, for his services in various foreign embassies, donates to Vince, Comes of the Szekler of Sebus, the land called Zek between the territory of the Vlachs of Kyrch, the Saxons of Barasu, and the Szeklers of Sebus, which once belonged to a Saxon estate called Fulkun, but has been uninhabited since the Mongol invasion.

In 1256 King Béla IV of Hungary, upon the complaint of Archbishop Benedict of Esztergom, confirms the right of the archdiocese to tithes from mining wages and from animal taxes collected from the Szeklers and Vlachs to the king or anyone else, among the judicial, accommodation and taxation privileges of the archdiocese, with the exception of land rents from Saxons, but also from Vlachs from everywhere and from anywhere they came.

King Ottokar II of Bohemia reports to Pope Alexander IV that about the defeated of King Béla IV of Hungary on 12 July 1260, on the border between Hungary and Austria, near the castle and town of Hemburg on the Moraua River. Among the people that fought in Béla's army Vlachs, called Walachorum, are named.

In 1272, King Ladislaus donates the royal lands or villages of Budula and Tohou, also known as Olahteleky, to Simon's son, Nicholas of Brașov.

From 1276 King Ladislaus allows the chapter of Alba Iulia to settle 60 Romanian households (mansiones) on the border of his estates called Fülesd and Enyed, separated from the episcopal lands, and to exempt them from all royal taxes, fiftieth and tithes.

In a grant (around 1280) Queen Helena confirmed the grant given by Stefan Vladislav to the Vranjina monastery, the Vlachs are separately mentioned, along with Arbanasi (Albanians), Latins, and Serbs.

In the 1280s, Simon of Kéza in the Gesta Hunnorum et Hungarorum mentions the Vlachs in his work three times: After the land had been conquered by King Attila, several people left Pannonia, the Vlachs (Blackis) were elected to remain in Pannonia who had been their shepherds and husbandmen. The Székelys were settled with the Vlachs (Blackis) in the border mountains, mingling with them, and adopting their alphabet. After the withdrawal of the Huns, the only people left in Pannonia were immigrants, Slavs, Greeks, Germans, Moravians, and Vlachs (Ulahis) who had been servants of Attila. Miskolczy points out that the (Ulahis advenis) "Vlach newcomer", the adjective classifying Romanians as immigrants was omitted from the Romanian translation. Pop on other hand argues that Moravians (Slavs), as well as the Byzantines (Greeks), Germans (Teutons, East Franks), Bulgarians (Messians) and Romanians (Vlachs) are confirmed by other sources as being present in Pannonia or, at least, on its edges in the period preceding the appearance of the Hungarians. Some Hungarian scholars noted that Simon of Kéza used different spellings for Blackis and Ulahis, arguing that Blackis were actually the Turkic people Bulaqs who were confused with the Vlachs. According to Polish historian Ryszard Grzesik, the Vlachs appeared in Transylvania only in the 12th century, therefore Hungarian chroniclers identified the semi-nomadic lifestyle of the Vlachs as a distinguishing characteristic. Kézai wrote that the Vlachs gave script to the Székelys, but the reality is different, because Kézai wrote about the Székelys runs, and his opinion was based on the observation that the Vlach shepherds engraved symbols while counting their sheep. Kézai confused the Székely runs with the Cyrillic script which was used by the Vlachs.

Ragusan medieval notary records mention Vlachs in the vicinity of the city were attacked and robbed by several Ragusans in 1284.

Several sources cite that the passes of the Carpathians in Transylvania were defended by the Vlachs together with Székelys and Saxons during the Second Mongol invasion of Hungary in 1285.

According to the old Russian chronicle, Ladislaus IV of Hungary asked for help from Rome and Constantinople because he feared an invasion by the Tartars. Constantinople sent an army of Vlachs from what is now Serbia, but after the victorious battle, the Vlachs refused to go home and settled in the territory of Maramures.

Also in 1285, Emperor Andronikos II Palaiologos decides to move the Vlachs from Thrace to Asia-Minor, fearing their possible alliance with the Tatars. The same emperor, in 1289, confirms the rights of St. Andrew Monastery from Thessaly over the village Praktikatous or Vlachokatouna.

In 1288, as external threats from the Tatars, Cumans, Saracens, and other pagans arose (omnino Tartarorum vel Cumanum Saracenum vel Meugarium), the universitas of the Vlachs was called to join the other Estates, including Hungarian nobles, Saxons and Szeklers (universisque nobilibus Ungarorum, Saxonibus, Syculis et Volachis), along with Church representatives from Brașov and Sibiu counties. This assembly was convened to defend the Christian faith, as stated in a letter from Lodomer, Archbishop of Esztergom.

According to a legend, in 1290 Ladislaus the Cuman was assassinated; the new Hungarian king allegedly drove voivode Radu Negru and his people across the Carpathians, where they formed Wallachia along with its first capital Câmpulung, as a Hungarian vassal state.

In 1291 Andrew III of Hungary presides over a meeting of "Nobles, Saxons, Szeklers, and Vlachs" in Alba Iulia.

In 1292, Andrew III of Hungary allows some Hungarian nobles to invite Vlachs to the country, to their estates called "Ilye", "Szád" and "Fenes".

In 1293, Andrew III of Hungary, publishes an "angry" charter to the Transylvanian nobility, mentions that all the Vlachs were supposed to be settled on the royal crown's property called "Székes", not on their own estates.

Andronikos III Palaiologos grants in 1293 to Leo Koteanitzis an estate called Preasnitza, presumably near Ograzhden (mountain) which he took from various Vlachs.

In November 1293, King Andrew confirms King Ladislaus's earlier concession to the chapter of Alba Iulia to keep the 60 households of Romanians (mansiones Olacorum) free from all taxes and services on the lands of Dalya, Ompaycza, Fylesd and Enugd, separated from the episcopal estates. These Romanians should not be forced by any royal tax collector to pay taxes, dues, or fiftieths. The charter, confirmed by a double seal, is dated by the hand of Theodore, provost of Fehérvár, vice-chancellor.

=== 14th century ===
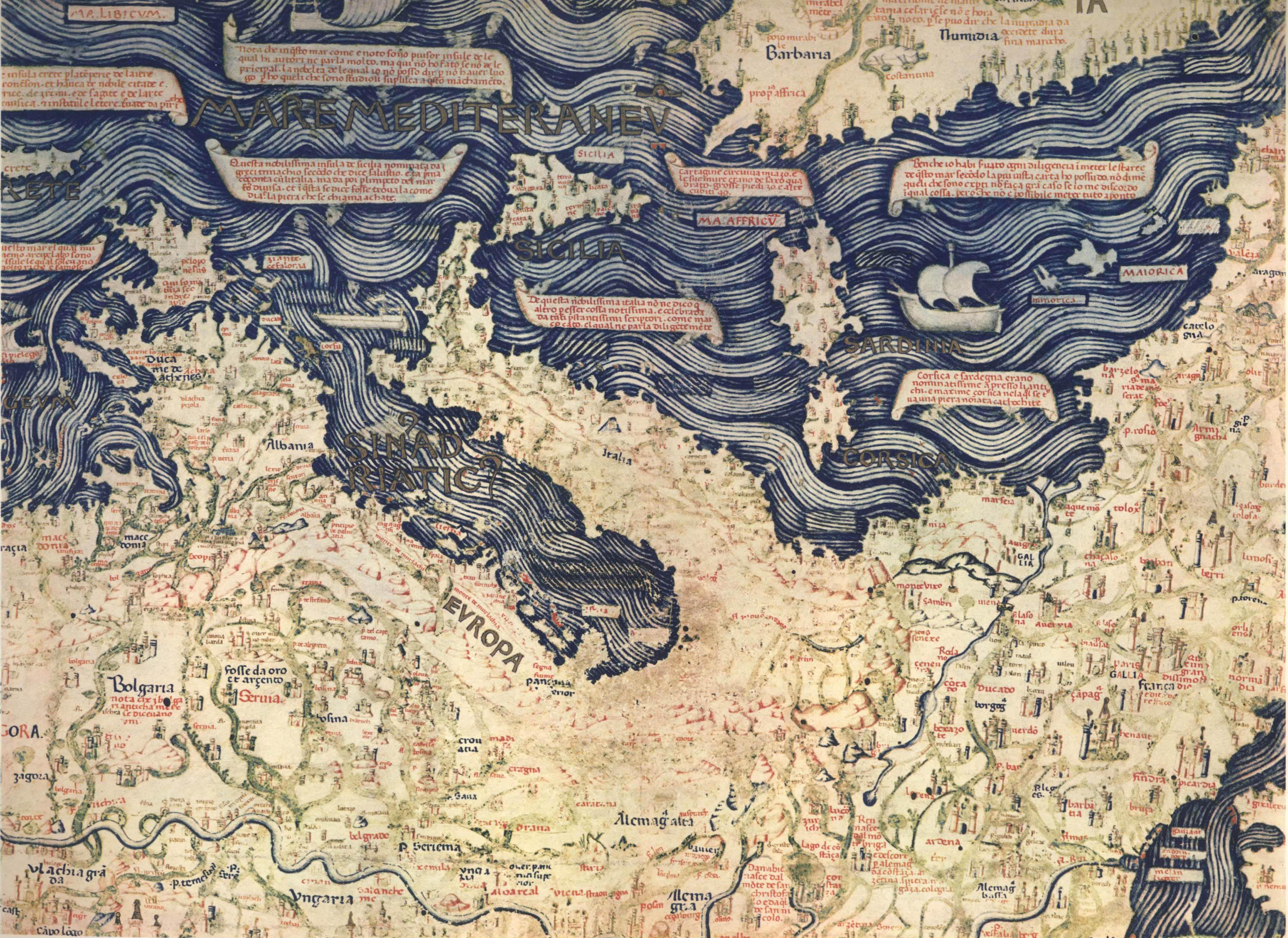
Fra Mauro's map, sector XXIX, showing Vlachia Piccola in Thessaly and Monte de Murlachi in Dalmatia – c. 1450 CE

Stefan Milutin Serbian king donated 6 katuns to the church of St. Nikita in Bania.

Stefan Milutin, in another medieval Serbian document, mentions that 30 Vlach families live on a church estate near Pristina.

In 1321 on the island of Krk, a priest gave land to the church, and the given land extended to the land of Kneže, where Vlachs lived.

In a battle, Vlachs fought alongside Mladen Šubić near Trogir in 1322.

King Władysław I Łokietek attacks Brandenburg with neighboring Vlach reinforcements "etiam vicinorum populorum, videlicet Ruthenorum, Walachorum et Lithwanorum stipatusc".

Goods sold by the Vlachs are mentioned in after 1328 by Ragusan documents, among them formaedi vlacheschi, a type of cheese.

First mention of a Vlach called Radul in 1329, in the Istrian Peninsula.

In 1330 Stefan Dečanski gifts to Visoki Dečani monastery the Vlach pastures and katuns along Drim and Lim rivers.

Croatian chronicler Miha de Barbazanis writes that Vlachs from the area of Cetina River fought for Mladen II Šubić of Bribir against Charles I of Hungary and Ban John Babonić.

In the list of Papal Tithes from 1332–1337 in the Kingdom of Hungary, one settlement mentioned in the source as Romanian: "Căprioara". This Romanian place-name is the first recorded Romanian toponym in the Kingdom of Hungary, including Transylvania.

In 1335, a royal commissioner, on the orders of the King of Hungary, arranges for a Vlach voivode named Bogdan to move to the Kingdom of Hungary "with his entire household and people". According to the charter, the settlement of the Vlach voivode and his people lasted from 1 November 1334 to 15 August 1335.

In 1341, a Hungarian royal document notes that the Hungarian Czibak noble family can invite and settle more Vlachs to their Mező-Telegd estate, "from the south".

Stefan Dušan styles himself "Imperator Raxie et Romanie, dispotus Lartae et Blachie comes" – Emperor of Rascia and Romania, despot of Arta and ispan of Vlachia. Stefan Dušan donates 320 Vlach families to the Bistrica monastery. A charter, issued by Stefan Dušan, mentions that, Dobrodoliane is inhabited by Vlachs.

Morlachs are first recorded in 1344, during the struggle between the counts of the Kurjaković and Nelipić families, in the regions near Knin and Krbava, when a region called "Morlacorum" mentioned.

A letter from 1345 from Pope Clement VI to the Hungarian king Louis I, the phrase quod Olachi Romani appears, which can be interpreted as an expression of the papal chancellery's conviction about the Roman origin of the Wallachians.

In 1349, another Hungarian royal charter mentions the Vlachs, allowing the Wallachian voivode to send a Vlach priest to Transylvania, thus encouraging more Vlachs to settle in the Hungarian kingdom from the south.

A Hungarian charter of 1352 states that, the lord lieutenant of Krassó County Szeri Pósa invited Vlachs to Hungary, to populate the area around the Mutnok stream.

Around 1355, Bogdan of Cuhea, former Voivode of Maramureș, but now in conflict with Louis I of Hungary, crosses the mountains with other Vlachs from Maramureș and takes over Moldavia.

In 1359, the King of Hungary allowed a Vlach noble family and their household to settle in the country, first giving them 13 villages, and then 6 years later another 5 villages in the Banat.

Also in 1359, the village of Lakság "near Várad", reports in a letter to the bishop of Várad that "the first Vlach inhabitants have arrived".

In 1365 Balc, son of Voivode Sas of Moldavia, defeated by Bogdan, moves to the Kingdom of Hungary and is given by Louis I of Hungary the confiscated domains of his opponent. Later, Balc became the head of Szatmár (Sătmar), Ugocsa and Máramaros (Maramureș) counties in the Kingdom of Hungary, and he was also invested with the title of Count of the Székelys.

Vlachs from the domain of Vidčeselo, between Lika and Zrmanja, are rewarded for their military support by the ban of Croatia .

In June 1366 King Louis I of Hungary grants through the Decree of Turda special privileges to the Transylvanian noblemen to take measures against malefactors belonging to any nation, especially the Vlachs.

In 1370, Louis I of Hungary decreed that only those Vlach settlers who were Catholic could receive royal grants.

The village of Wołodź in Ruthenia was first documented in 1373 as a Vlach settlement.

In a letter dates to 1374, the Cathedral chapter of Várad complains that he has only 9 Vlach villages, and asks for permission "to invite more Vlachs into the country" and to "settle them on his estates". Also in the same letter, he asks the "border nobles" that "if strangers come from Wallachia, do not stop them".

Papal documents from late 14th century reference the conquest of Medieș fortress "from the hands of schismatic Vlachs" by an unnamed King of Hungary. Historian Ioan-Aurel Pop places this event close to the Fourth Council of the Lateran

In 1374, the Cathedral chapter of Várad complained that the Vlachs living in its territory are not willing to give up their nomadic lifestyle.

In 1374, Bishop László of Várad obliges his successors not to prevent the Vlach knezes from settle further "foreigners" to the border areas of Bónafalva, Királybányatoplica and Keresztényfalva.

In 1376 the ban of Knin is also called "comes Holachorum".

In 1381 Croatian documents from Knin mention "universitas Valachorum".

In 1383 the so-called "Peace convention of Christian" is signed by Saxons and Romanians (Vlachs) from the area of Sibiu, aimed to ensure the peace between the two communities.

Vlachs are a documented presence in Belz region since the rule of Siemowit IV, Duke of Masovia, probably as early as 1388.

In the 14th century, royal charters from the Kingdom of Serbia included segregation policies stating that "a Serb shall not marry a Vlach". However, these laws were not successful and intermarriage between Slavs, Vlachs and also Albanians did take place.

=== 15th century ===
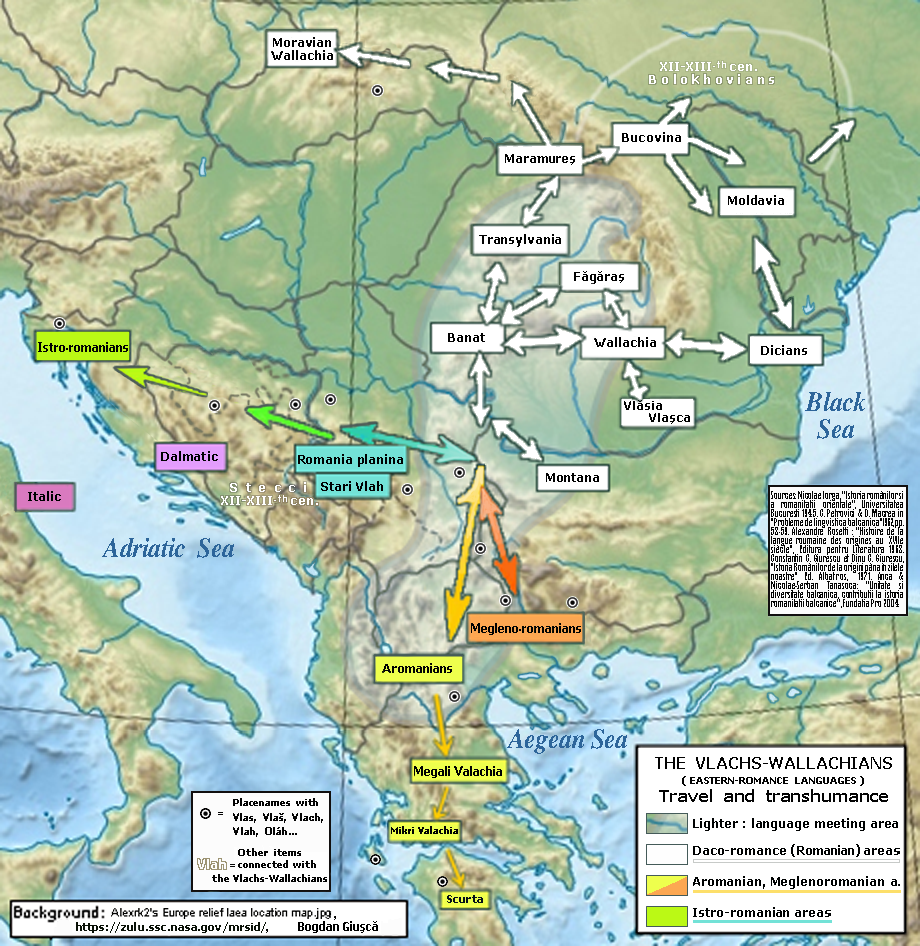
Map showing the transhumance paths of the Eastern Romance peoples

In 1412, the captain of Zadar saved 3000 ducats to organise an army against the looting Morlachs, who lived in Ostravica, whose castle has even been taken by them. The leader of the Morlahcs was a person called Sandallor.

The biggest caravan shipment between Podvisoki in Bosnia and Republic of Ragusa was recorded on 9 August 1428, where Vlachs transported 1500 modius of salt with 600 horses.

In 1433 Vlach knezes, voievodes, and juzi from Croatia vow to respect the property right of the local St. John church.

Vlachs are mentioned in a document of Grand Duke Švitrigaila, in Kremenets, as part of the local population subject to mayor of Busk legal authority.

Nicholas of Ilok styled himself as "Bosniae and Valachiae Rex".

In 1450, the Vlachs are granted a privilege in Šibenik, allowing the Vlachs to enter the town if they call themselves Croats.

Italian humanist Poggio Bracciolini claims in 1450 that Trajan left a colony among the Sarmatians which still retains much of the Latin vocabulary, and that its members say: "oculum, digitum, manum, panem, and many other things, from which it appears that the Latins, who remained there as settlers, used the Latin language."

In 1453, Flavio Biondo notes that "the Dacians or Vlachs claim to have Roman origins and they think this fact is a decoration in itself" and that "when they spoke the language of their common and simple people it scent of a grammatically incorrect peasant Latin".

King Matthias confirmed the liberties of the Vlachs in an open letter, issued 31 March 1474 in the town of Ružomberok.

Jan Długosz in his Annales seu cronici incliti regni Poloniae wrote about Vlachs in Medieval Poland – Małopolska region, theorizing their origin as a population that came from Italy or Rome who expelled the Ruthenian (Slavic) population from the Danube settlements, and then they themselves settled in the fertile lands there.

An attested reference to Romanian comes from a Latin title of an oath made in 1485 by the Moldavian Prince Stephen the Great to the Polish King Casimir, in which it is reported that "Haec Inscriptio ex Valachico in Latinam versa est sed Rex Ruthenica Lingua scriptam accepta"—"This Inscription was translated from Valachian (Romanian) into Latin, but the King has received it written in the Ruthenian language (Slavic)."

=== Ottoman Empire ===
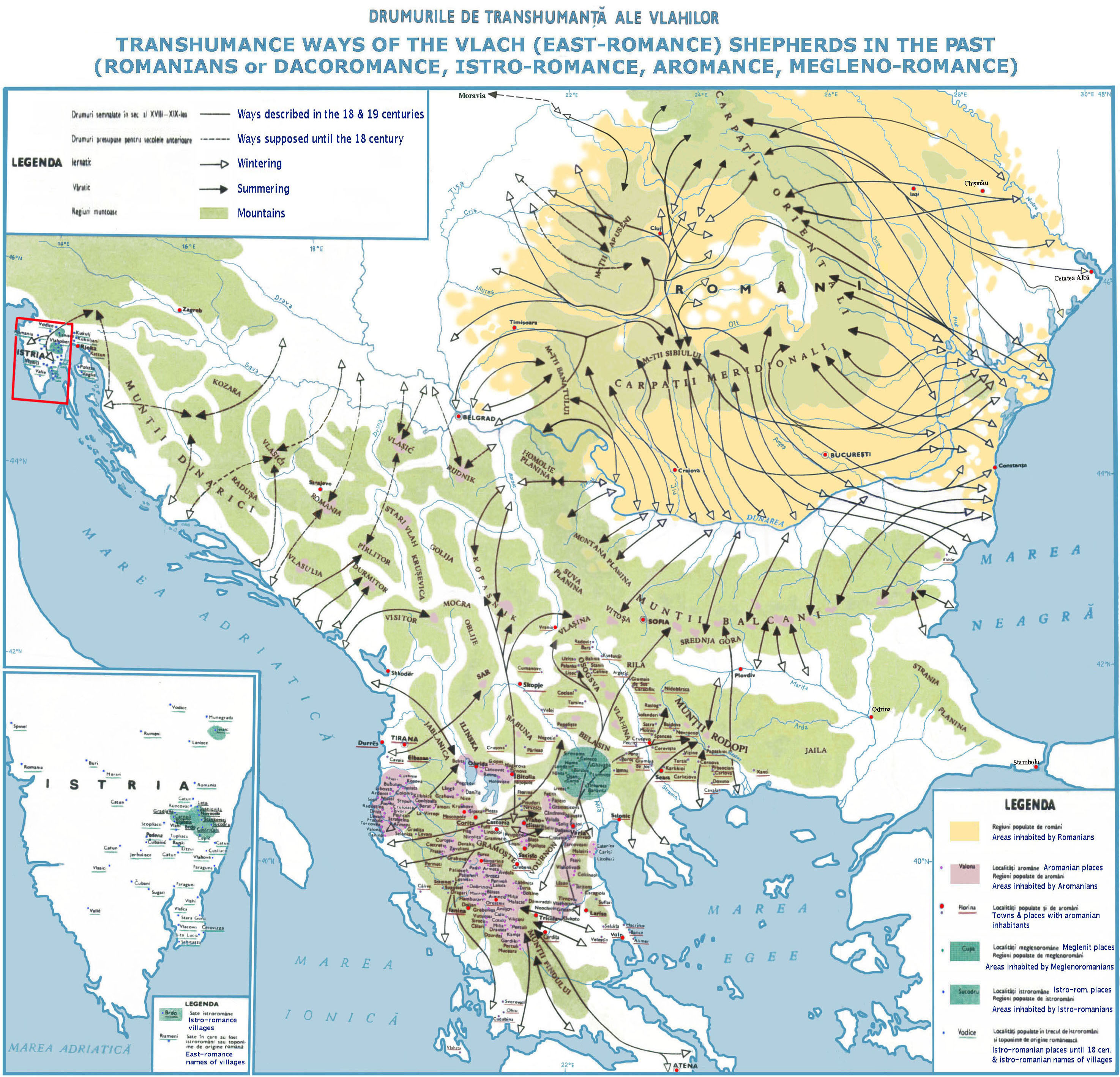
Transhumance ways of the Vlach shepherds in the 18th and 19th centuries. Vlachs engaged in both transhumant pastoralism and sedentary agriculture.

Vlachs in the Balkans were granted tax concessions under Byzantine and Serb rulers in return for military service; and this continued under Ottoman rule. Instead of some of the customary taxes, they paid a special "Vlach tax", Rüsûm-i Eflakiye: One sheep and one lamb from each household on St. Georges Day each year. Because Vlachs were taxed differently, they were listed differently in defters.

== Toponymy ==
In addition to the ethnic groups of Aromanians, Megleno-Romanians and Istro-Romanians who emerged during the Migration Period, other Vlachs could be found as far north as Poland, as far west as Moravia and Dalmatia. In search of better pasture, they were called Vlasi or Valaši by the Slavs. States mentioned in medieval chronicles were:

- Wallachia – between the Southern Carpathians and the Danube (Țara Românească in Romanian); Bassarab-Wallachia (Bassarab's Wallachia and Ungro-Wallachia or Wallachia Transalpina in administrative sources;
- Moldavia – between the Carpathians and the Dniester river (Bogdano-Wallachia; Bogdan's Wallachia, Moldo-Wallachia or Maurovlachia; Black Wallachia, Moldovlachia or Rousso-Vlachia in Byzantine sources);
- Second Bulgarian Empire, between the Carpathians and the Balkan Mountains – Regnum Bulgarorum et Blachorum in documents by Pope Innocent III
- Terra Prodnicorum (or Terra Brodnici), mentioned by Pope Honorius III in 1222. Vlachs led by Ploskanea supported the Tatars in the 1223 Battle of Kalka. Vlach lands near Galicia in the west, Volhynia in the north, Moldova in the south and the Bolohoveni lands in the east were conquered by Galicia.

Regions and places are:

- White Wallachia in Moesia
- Great Wallachia (Μεγάλη Βλαχία, Megáli vlahía) in Thessaly
- Small Wallachia (Μικρή Βλαχία, Mikrí vlahía) in Aetolia, Acarnania, Dorida and Locrida
- Morlachia, in Lika-Dalmatia
- Upper Wallachia (Άνω Βλαχία, Áno Vlahía) in southern Macedonia, Albania and Epirus
- Magna Vlachia in southern Macedonia, Albania and Epirus
- Stari Vlah ("the Old Vlach"), a region in southwestern Serbia
- Maior Vlachia, a region in southwestern part of Croatia mentioned in 1373
- Romanija mountain (Romanija planina) in eastern Bosnia and Herzegovina
- Vlașca County, a former county of southern Wallachia (derived from Slavic Vlaška)
- Greater Wallachia, an older name for the region of Muntenia, southeastern Romania
- Lesser Wallachia, an older name for the region of Oltenia, southwestern Romania
- An Italian writer called the Banat Valachia citeriore ("Wallachia on this side") in 1550.
- Valahia transalpina, including Făgăraș and Hațeg
- Moravian Wallachia (Czech: Moravské Valašsko), in the Beskid Mountains (Czech: Beskydy) of the Czech Republic.

== Shepherd culture ==
As national states appeared in the area of the former Ottoman Empire, new state borders were developed that divided the summer and winter habitats of many of the transhumance groups. During the Middle Ages, many Vlachs were shepherds who drove their flocks through the mountains of Central and Eastern Europe. Vlach shepherds may be found as far north as southern Poland (Podhale) and the eastern Czech Republic (Moravia) by following the Carpathians, the Dinaric Alps in the west, the Pindus Mountains in the south, and the Caucasus Mountains in the east. In Slovak language, the term Valasi became a synonym for apprentice shepherds.

Some researchers, such as Bogumil Hrabak and Marian Wenzel, theorized that the origins of Stećci tombstones, which appeared in medieval Bosnia between 12th and 16th century, could be attributed to Vlach burial culture of Bosnia and Herzegovina of that times.

== Gallery ==
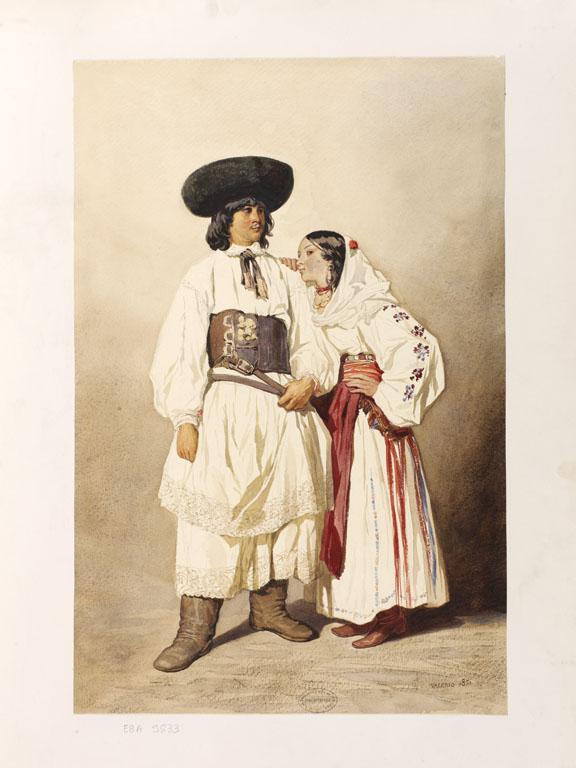
Théodore Valerio, Paysans valaques des environs de Lugos. Vlach/Romanian peasants from around Lugoj, 1851.

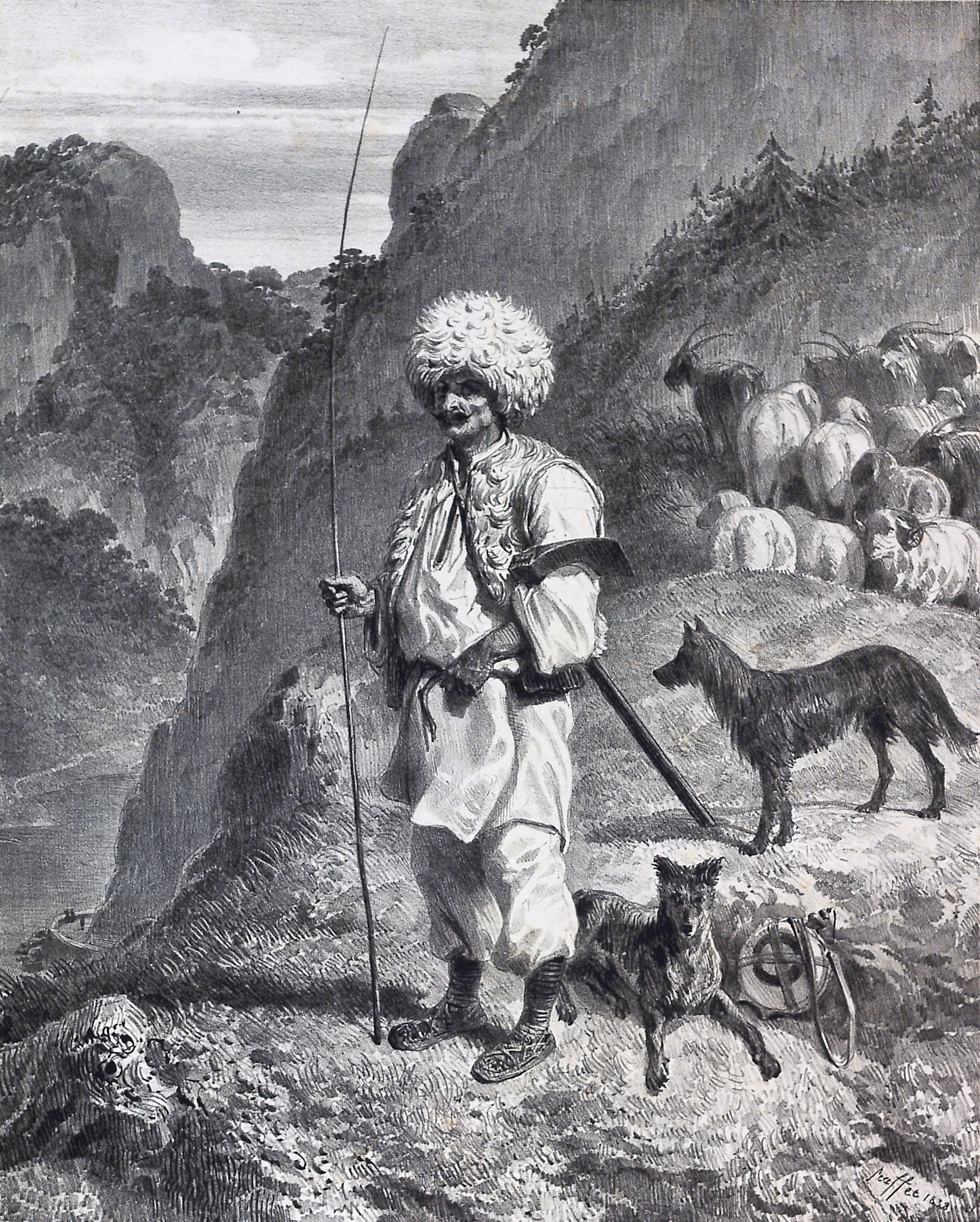
Vlach shepherd of Banat (Auguste Raffet, c. 1837)

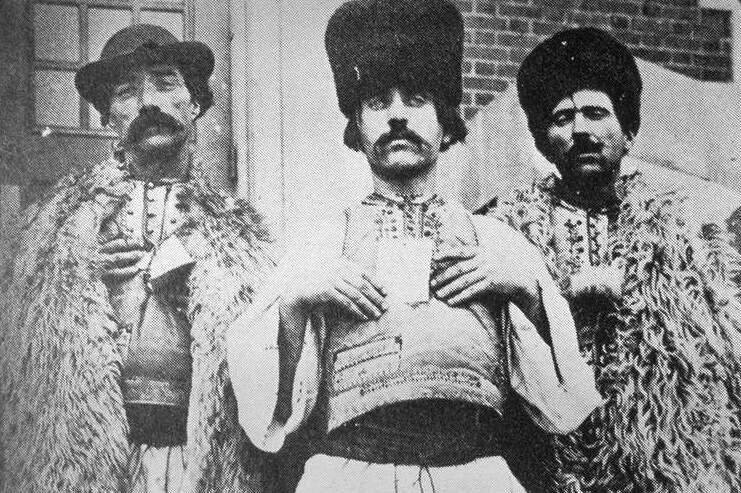
Romanian immigrants in Ellis Island, United States

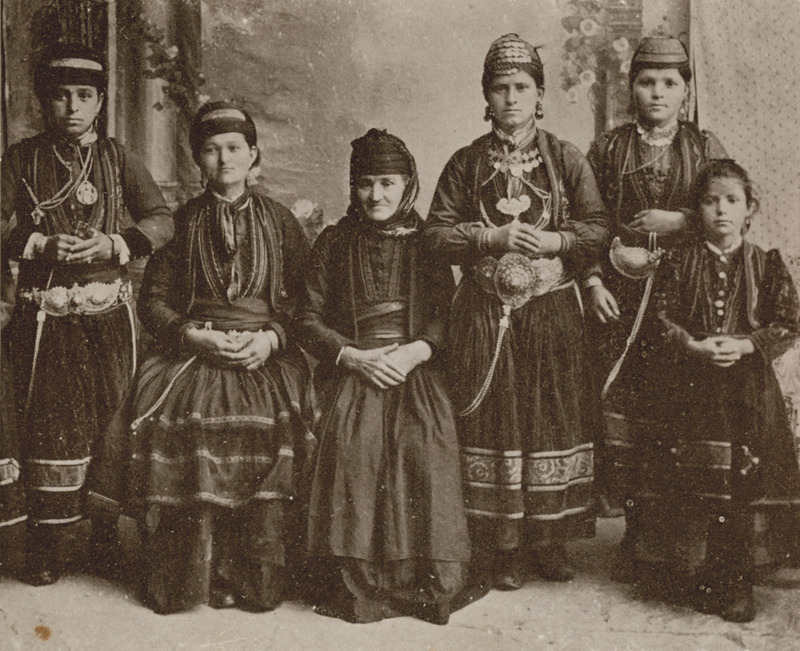
Vlach women in traditional dress, North Macedonia/Greece, Van Den Brule Alfred, 1907

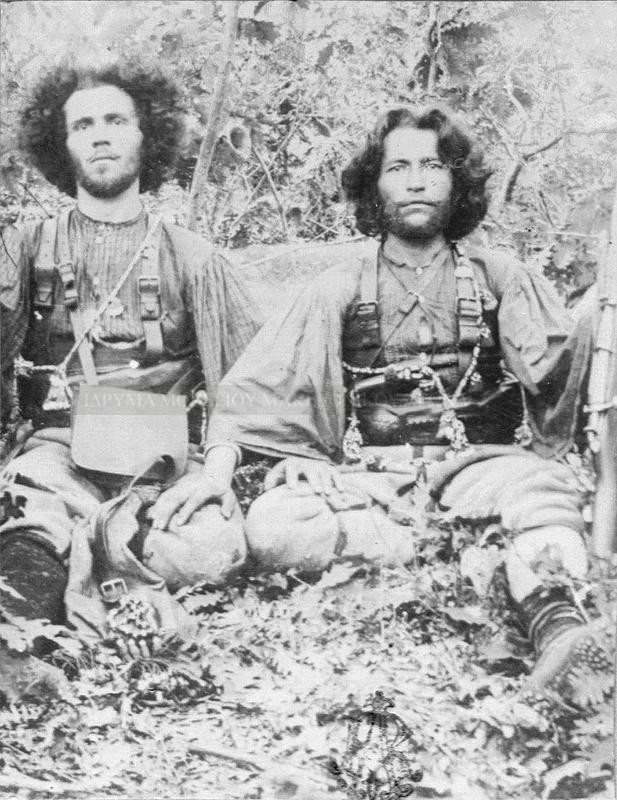
Vlach revolutionaries in the Internal Macedonian Revolutionary Organization against the Ottoman Empire from Veria (today in northern Greece), between 1900 and 1908

== Legacy ==
According to Ilona Czamańska "for several recent centuries the investigation of the Vlachian ethnogenesis was so much dominated by political issues that any progress in this respect was incredibly difficult". The transhumance of Vlachs, the heirs of Roman citizens, may be a key for solving the problem of ethnogenesis, but the problem is that many migrations were in multiple directions during the same time. These migrations were not just part of the history of the Balkans and the Carpathians, they exist in the Caucasus, the Adriatic islands and possibly over the entire region of the Mediterranean Sea. Because of this, our knowledge concerning primary migrations of the Vlachs and the ethnogenesis is more than modest.

Researcher have also raised a concern about cultural appropriation of Vlach heritage in the Balkans, denial of Vlach descent of various groups and personalities, and exclusion from political life.

== See also ==
- Oláh
- Morlachs
- Romania in the Early Middle Ages
- Statuta Valachorum
- Supplex Libellus Valachorum
- Vlach (Ottoman social class)
- Vlach law
- Vlachs in medieval Serbia
- Vlachs in the history of Croatia
- Vlachs in medieval Bosnia and Herzegovina
