= Oláh (surname) =

Oláh is an old Hungarian family name meaning Romanian.

The name is descended from the word Vlach (see also Walhaz), and was used to designate the Romanians in the Kingdom of Hungary. In the Hungarian language, the word 'Romanian' is a modern neologism (adopted from the Romanian endonym român), first used in the draft nationality law of July 21, 1849, at the request of Transylvanian Romanians.

In 2020, it was the 16th most common surname in Hungary, borne by 38,407 people.

People with this surname include:

- Bálint Oláh (born 1994), Hungarian footballer
- Barbara Oláh (born 1993), Hungarian race walker
- Béla Oláh (born 1956), Hungarian weightlifter
- Benedek Oláh (born 1991), Finnish table tennis player
- Benjámin Oláh (born 2005), Hungarian footballer
- Gergő Oláh, multiple people
- Ibolya Oláh (born 1978), Hungarian singer
- István Oláh (1926–1985), Hungarian politician
- István Oláh Nelu (born 1972), Hungarian biathlete
- Katalin Oláh (born 1968), Hungarian orienteering competitor
- Lajos Oláh (born 1969), Hungarian politician
- Lóránt Oláh (born 1979), Serbian footballer
- Mihály Oláh (1949–2023), Hungarian equestrian
- Nicolaus Olahus (1493–1568), Hungarian archbishop

== Other uses ==
- Stadion Oláh Gábor Út, stadium in Debrecen, Hungary

== See also ==
- Olah (surname)
- Wallachia
