= Zagrađe =

Zagrađe (Serbian Cyrillic: Заграђе) may refer to:

In Bosnia and Herzegovina:

- Zagrađe, settlement in Municipality of Kakanj
- Zagrađe, Kladanj, settlement in Municipality of Kladanj
- Zagrađe, settlement in Municipality of Kotor Varoš
- Zagrađe, Milići, settlement in the Municipality of Milići, Republika Srpska
- Zagrađe, settlement in Municipality of Sokolac
- Zagrađe, Travnik, settlement in Municipality of Travnik

In Croatia:

- Zagrađe, Croatia

In Montenegro:

- Zagrađe, Bar
- Zagrađe, Berane Municipality

In Serbia:

- Zagrađe, Gornji Milanovac
- Zagrađe, Kuršumlija
- Zagrađe, Zaječar
