= Janjac =

Janjac Јањац
- Village
- Location within Bosnia and Herzegovina
- Coordinates: 44°12′25″N 17°50′16″E
- Country: Bosnia and Herzegovina
- Entity: Federation of Bosnia and Herzegovina
- Canton: Zenica-Doboj
- Municipality: Zenica

Area
  - Total: 0.78 sq mi (2.03 km^{2})

Population (2013)
  - Total: 111
  - Density: 142/sq mi (54.7/km^{2})
- Time zone: UTC+1 (CET)
  - Summer (DST): UTC+2 (CEST)

Janjac (Cyrillic: Јањац) is a village in the City of Zenica, Bosnia and Herzegovina.

Not to be confused with Janjač.

== Demographics ==
According to the 2013 census, its population was 111.

Ethnicity in 2013
Ethnicity	Number	Percentage
Croats	95	85.6%
Bosniaks	15	13.5%
other/undeclared	1	0.9%
Total	111	100%
