= Gladovići =

Gladovići may refer to:

- Gladovići (Srebrenica), a village in Srebrenica, Bosnia and Herzegovina
- Gladovići (Zenica), a village in City of Zenica, Bosnia and Herzegovina
