= Prijevor =

Prijevor may refer to:

== Bosnia and Herzegovina ==
- Prijevor, Bileća, village in Bileća
- Prijevor, Foča, plateau on the Maglić mountain
- Prijevor, Kladanj, a village in Kladanj

== Croatia ==
- Prijevor, Dubrovnik, village in Dubrovnik
- Prijevor, Mljet, group of villages in Mljet

== Montenegro ==
- Prijevor, Budva, village in Budva
- Prijevor, Herceg Novi, village in Herceg Novi

== Serbia ==
- Prijevor, Čačak, village in Čačak
