= Jelačići =

Jelačići may refer to:

- Jelačići, Jablanica, Bosnia and Herzegovina
- Jelačići, Kladanj, Bosnia and Herzegovina
- Jelačići (Trnovo), Bosnia and Herzegovina
- Jelačići (Višegrad), Bosnia and Herzegovina

== See also ==
- Jelačić, a surname
