= Javor, Šekovići =

Javor
- Village
- Location within Bosnia and Herzegovina
- Coordinates: 44.3400125°N 18.7507864°E
- Country: Bosnia and Herzegovina
- Entity: Republika Srpska; Federation of Bosnia and Herzegovina
- Region Canton: Bijeljina; Tuzla
- Municipality: Šekovići; Kladanj

Area
  - Total: 5.86 sq mi (15.19 km^{2})

Population (2013)
  - Total: 137
  - Density: 23.4/sq mi (9.02/km^{2})

Javor is a village in the municipalities of Šekovići, Republika Srpska and Kladanj, Bosnia and Herzegovina.

== Demographics ==
According to the 2013 census, its population was 137, all Serbs living in the Šekovići part.
