= Kaštijelj =

- Village
- Location within Bosnia and Herzegovina
- Coordinates: 44.3432555°N 18.7637472°E
- Country: Bosnia and Herzegovina
- Entity: Republika Srpska; Federation of Bosnia and Herzegovina
- Region Canton: Bijeljina; Tuzla
- Municipality: Šekovići; Kladanj

Area
  - Total: 2.93 sq mi (7.58 km^{2})

Population (2013)
  - Total: 128
  - Density: 43.7/sq mi (16.9/km^{2})

Kaštijelj is a village in the municipalities of Šekovići (Republika Srpska) and Kladanj, Bosnia and Herzegovina.

== Demographics ==
According to the 2013 census, its population was 128, all Serbs living in the Šekovići part.
