= Gornja Vraca =

Gornja Vraca Горња Враца
- Village
- Location within Bosnia and Herzegovina
- Coordinates: 44°11′44″N 17°58′45″E
- Country: Bosnia and Herzegovina
- Entity: Federation of Bosnia and Herzegovina
- Canton: Zenica-Doboj
- Municipality: Zenica

Area
  - Total: 1.19 sq mi (3.09 km^{2})

Population (2013)
  - Total: 191
  - Density: 160/sq mi (61.8/km^{2})
- Time zone: UTC+1 (CET)
  - Summer (DST): UTC+2 (CEST)

Gornja Vraca (Cyrillic: Горња Враца) is a village in the City of Zenica, Bosnia and Herzegovina.

== Demographics ==
According to the 2013 census, its population was 191.

Ethnicity in 2013
Ethnicity	Number	Percentage
Bosniaks	153	80.1%
Croats	35	18.3%
Serbs	1	0.5%
other/undeclared	2	1.0%
Total	191	100%
