= Klještani =

- Village
- Location within Bosnia and Herzegovina
- Coordinates: 44.1944622°N 18.8159751°E
- Country: Bosnia and Herzegovina
- Entity: Republika Srpska; Federation of Bosnia and Herzegovina
- Region Canton: Bijeljina; Tuzla
- Municipality: Vlasenica; Kladanj

Area
  - Total: 4.01 sq mi (10.38 km^{2})

Population (2013)
  - Total: 25
  - Density: 6.2/sq mi (2.4/km^{2})

Klještani is a village in the municipalities of Vlasenica (Republika Srpska) and Kladanj, Bosnia and Herzegovina.

== Demographics ==
According to the 2013 census, its population was 25, all Serbs living in the Vlasenica part.
