= Šiblići =

- Village
- Location within Bosnia and Herzegovina
- Coordinates: 44.2315322°N 18.0384994°E
- Country: Bosnia and Herzegovina
- Entity: Federation of Bosnia and Herzegovina
- Canton: Zenica-Doboj
- Municipality: Zenica

Area
  - Total: 0.95 sq mi (2.45 km^{2})

Population (2013)
  - Total: 422
  - Density: 446/sq mi (172/km^{2})
- Time zone: UTC+1 (CET)
  - Summer (DST): UTC+2 (CEST)

Šiblići is a village in the City of Zenica, Bosnia and Herzegovina.

== Demographics ==
According to the 2013 census, its population was 422.

Ethnicity in 2013
Ethnicity	Number	Percentage
Bosniaks	421	99.8%
other/undeclared	1	0.2%
Total	422	100%
