= Tuholj =

- Village
- Location within Bosnia and Herzegovina
- Coordinates: 44°15′49″N 18°37′23″E
- Country: Bosnia and Herzegovina
- Entity: Federation of Bosnia and Herzegovina
- Canton: Tuzla
- Municipality: Kladanj

Area
  - Total: 11.03 sq mi (28.58 km^{2})

Population (2013)
  - Total: 337
  - Density: 30.5/sq mi (11.8/km^{2})

Tuholj (Cyrillic: Тухољ) is a village in Bosnia and Herzegovina. It is located in the municipality of Kladanj in Tuzla Canton, Federation of Bosnia and Herzegovina. In 1991, the majority of the 524 inhabitants were ethnic Bosniaks.

== Demographics ==
According to the 2013 census, its population was 337.

Ethnicity in 2013
Ethnicity	Number	Percentage
Bosniaks	334	99.1%
other/undeclared	3	0.9%
Total	337	100%

== See also ==
=== Linked articles ===
- List of cities in Bosnia and Herzegovina
- Municipalities of Bosnia and Herzegovina
