= Lokvine =

- Village
- Location within Bosnia and Herzegovina
- Coordinates: 44.2043939°N 17.8446561°E
- Country: Bosnia and Herzegovina
- Entity: Federation of Bosnia and Herzegovina
- Canton: Zenica-Doboj
- Municipality: Zenica

Area
  - Total: 1.01 sq mi (2.62 km^{2})

Population (2013)
  - Total: 866
  - Density: 856/sq mi (331/km^{2})
- Time zone: UTC+1 (CET)
  - Summer (DST): UTC+2 (CEST)

Lokvine is a village in the City of Zenica, Bosnia and Herzegovina.

== Demographics ==
According to the 2013 census, its population was 866.

Ethnicity in 2013
| Ethnicity | Number | Percentage |
|---|---|---|
| Bosniaks | 843 | 97.3% |
| Croats | 17 | 2.0% |
| other/undeclared | 6 | 0.7% |
| Total | 866 | 100% |
