= Obrenovci =

- Village
- Location within Bosnia and Herzegovina
- Coordinates: 44.2145523°N 17.8493237°E
- Country: Bosnia and Herzegovina
- Entity: Federation of Bosnia and Herzegovina
- Canton: Zenica-Doboj
- Municipality: Zenica

Area
  - Total: 0.53 sq mi (1.37 km^{2})

Population (2013)
  - Total: 536
  - Density: 1,010/sq mi (391/km^{2})
- Time zone: UTC+1 (CET)
  - Summer (DST): UTC+2 (CEST)

Obrenovci is a village in the City of Zenica, Bosnia and Herzegovina.

== Demographics ==
According to the 2013 census, its population was 536.

Ethnicity in 2013
| Ethnicity | Number | Percentage |
|---|---|---|
| Bosniaks | 508 | 94.8% |
| Croats | 15 | 2.8% |
| other/undeclared | 13 | 2.4% |
| Total | 536 | 100% |
