= Kasapovići =

Kasapovići Касаповићи
- Village
- Location within Bosnia and Herzegovina
- Coordinates: 44°13′25.5″N 17°57′55″E
- Country: Bosnia and Herzegovina
- Entity: Federation of Bosnia and Herzegovina
- Canton: Zenica-Doboj
- Municipality: Zenica

Area
  - Total: 2.13 sq mi (5.51 km^{2})

Population (2013)
  - Total: 266
  - Density: 125/sq mi (48.3/km^{2})
- Time zone: UTC+1 (CET)
  - Summer (DST): UTC+2 (CEST)

Kasapovići (Cyrillic: Касаповићи) is a village in the City of Zenica, Bosnia and Herzegovina. The population was 494 at the 2013 census.

== Demographics ==
According to the 2013 census, its population was 266.

Ethnicity in 2013
Ethnicity	Number	Percentage
Bosniaks	250	94.0%
Serbs	7	2.6%
Croats	2	0.8%
other/undeclared	7	2.6%
Total	266	100%
