= Kolići =

- Village
- Location within Bosnia and Herzegovina
- Coordinates: 44°21′41″N 17°52′57″E
- Country: Bosnia and Herzegovina
- Entity: Federation of Bosnia and Herzegovina
- Canton: Zenica-Doboj
- Municipality: Zenica

Area
  - Total: 0.91 sq mi (2.35 km^{2})

Population (2013)
  - Total: 247
  - Density: 272/sq mi (105/km^{2})
- Time zone: UTC+1 (CET)
  - Summer (DST): UTC+2 (CEST)

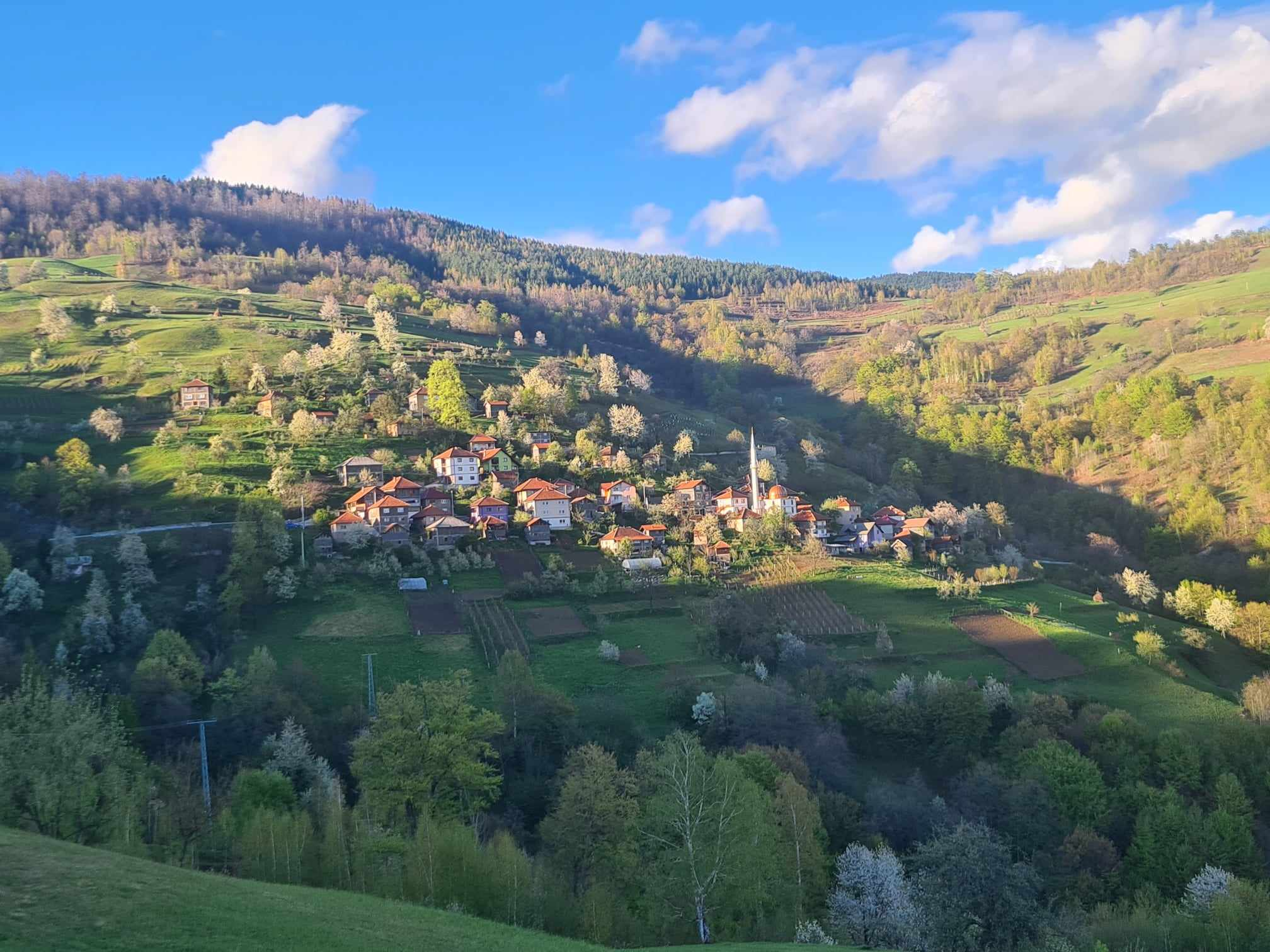
Kolići village

Kolići (Cyrillic: Колићи) is a village in the City of Zenica, Bosnia and Herzegovina. It is a family name passed down from the father, derived from personal names like Koljo or Nikola.The village covers an area of about 2.35 square kilometers.

== Demographics ==
According to the 2013 census, its population was 247, all Bosniaks.
