= Janjićki Vrh =

Janjićki Vrh Јањићки Врх
- Village
- Location within Bosnia and Herzegovina
- Coordinates: 44°9′30.5″N 17°55′51″E
- Country: Bosnia and Herzegovina
- Entity: Federation of Bosnia and Herzegovina
- Canton: Zenica-Doboj
- Municipality: Zenica

Area
  - Total: 1.22 sq mi (3.16 km^{2})

Population (2013)
  - Total: 7
  - Density: 5.7/sq mi (2.2/km^{2})
- Time zone: UTC+1 (CET)
  - Summer (DST): UTC+2 (CEST)

Janjićki Vrh (Cyrillic: Јањићки Врх) is a village in the City of Zenica, Bosnia and Herzegovina.

== Demographics ==
According to the 2013 census, its population was 7, all Bosniaks.
