= Sviće =

- Village
- Location within Bosnia and Herzegovina
- Coordinates: 44.23281°N 17.9350215°E
- Country: Bosnia and Herzegovina
- Entity: Federation of Bosnia and Herzegovina
- Canton: Zenica-Doboj
- Municipality: Zenica

Area
  - Total: 2.69 sq mi (6.97 km^{2})

Population (2013)
  - Total: 373
  - Density: 139/sq mi (53.5/km^{2})
- Time zone: UTC+1 (CET)
  - Summer (DST): UTC+2 (CEST)

Sviće is a village in the City of Zenica, Bosnia and Herzegovina.

== Demographics ==
According to the 2013 census, its population was 373.

Ethnicity in 2013
Ethnicity	Number	Percentage
Bosniaks	342	91.7%
Croats	18	4.8%
Serbs	11	2.9%
other/undeclared	2	0.5%
Total	373	100%
