= Bistrica Gornja =

- Village
- Location within Bosnia and Herzegovina
- Coordinates: 44°18′1″N 17°51′4″E
- Country: Bosnia and Herzegovina
- Entity: Federation of Bosnia and Herzegovina
- Canton: Zenica-Doboj
- Municipality: Zenica

Area
  - Total: 11.41 km^{2} (4.41 sq mi)

Population (2013)
  - Total: 8
  - Density: 0.70/km^{2} (1.8/sq mi)
- Time zone: UTC+1 (CET)
  - Summer (DST): UTC+2 (CEST)

Bistrica Gornja (Cyrillic: Бистрица Горња) is a village in the City of Zenica, Bosnia and Herzegovina.

== Demographics ==
According to the 2013 census, its population was 8, all Bosniaks.
