= Pepelari =

- Village
- Location within Bosnia and Herzegovina
- Coordinates: 44.30409°N 18.0308713°E
- Country: Bosnia and Herzegovina
- Entity: Federation of Bosnia and Herzegovina
- Canton: Zenica-Doboj
- Municipality: Zenica

Area
  - Total: 7.17 sq mi (18.57 km^{2})

Population (2013)
  - Total: 236
  - Density: 32.9/sq mi (12.7/km^{2})
- Time zone: UTC+1 (CET)
  - Summer (DST): UTC+2 (CEST)

Pepelari is a village in the City of Zenica, Bosnia and Herzegovina.

== Demographics ==
According to the 2013 census, its population was 236.

Ethnicity in 2013
Ethnicity	Number	Percentage
Bosniaks	222	94.1%
other/undeclared	14	5.9%
Total	236	100%
