= Briznik =

Briznik Бризник
- Village
- Location within Bosnia and Herzegovina
- Coordinates: 44°12′14″N 18°1′46″E
- Country: Bosnia and Herzegovina
- Entity: Federation of Bosnia and Herzegovina
- Canton: Zenica-Doboj
- Municipality: Zenica

Area
  - Total: 2.53 sq mi (6.56 km^{2})

Population (2013)
  - Total: 1,135
  - Density: 448/sq mi (173/km^{2})
- Time zone: UTC+1 (CET)
  - Summer (DST): UTC+2 (CEST)

Briznik (Cyrillic: Бризник) is a village in the City of Zenica, Bosnia and Herzegovina.

== Demographics ==
According to the 2013 census, its population was 1,135

Ethnicity in 2013
Ethnicity	Number	Percentage
Bosniaks	1,126	99.2%
other/undeclared	9	0.8%
Total	1,135	100%
