= Vražale (Zenica) =

Vražale Вражале
- Village
- Location within Bosnia and Herzegovina
- Coordinates: 44°10′45″N 17°53′47″E
- Country: Bosnia and Herzegovina
- Entity: Federation of Bosnia and Herzegovina
- Canton: Zenica-Doboj
- Municipality: Zenica

Area
  - Total: 0.67 sq mi (1.73 km^{2})

Population (2013)
  - Total: 291
  - Density: 436/sq mi (168/km^{2})
- Time zone: UTC+1 (CET)
  - Summer (DST): UTC+2 (CEST)

Vražale (Cyrillic: Вражале) is a village in the City of Zenica, Bosnia and Herzegovina.

== Demographics ==
According to the 2013 census, its population was 291.

Ethnicity in 2013
Ethnicity	Number	Percentage
Bosniaks	211	72.5%
Croats	60	20.6%
other/undeclared	20	6.9%
Total	291	100%
