= Vukotići, Zenica =

Vukotići
- Village
- Location within Bosnia and Herzegovina
- Coordinates: 44.3432262°N 17.8146875°E
- Country: Bosnia and Herzegovina
- Entity: Federation of Bosnia and Herzegovina
- Canton: Zenica-Doboj
- Municipality: Zenica

Area
  - Total: 2.08 sq mi (5.38 km^{2})

Population (2013)
  - Total: 767
  - Density: 369/sq mi (143/km^{2})
- Time zone: UTC+1 (CET)
  - Summer (DST): UTC+2 (CEST)

Vukotići is a village in the City of Zenica, Bosnia and Herzegovina.

== Demographics ==
According to the 2013 census, its population was 767, all Bosniaks.
