= Zahići =

- Village
- Location within Bosnia and Herzegovina
- Coordinates: 44.241525°N 18.0471684°E
- Country: Bosnia and Herzegovina
- Entity: Federation of Bosnia and Herzegovina
- Canton: Zenica-Doboj
- Municipality: Zenica

Area
  - Total: 0.63 sq mi (1.64 km^{2})

Population (2013)
  - Total: 239
  - Density: 377/sq mi (146/km^{2})
- Time zone: UTC+1 (CET)
  - Summer (DST): UTC+2 (CEST)

Zahići is a village in the City of Zenica, Bosnia and Herzegovina.

== Demographics ==
According to the 2013 census, its population was 239, all Bosniaks.
