= Gojakovići =

Gojakovići is a toponym that may refer to:

- Gojakovići, Kladanj, village in Bosnia and Herzegovina
- Gojakovići (Prijepolje), village in Serbia
