= Puhovac (Zenica) =

Puhovac Пуховац
- Village
- Location within Bosnia and Herzegovina
- Coordinates: 44°12′50″N 18°2′50″E
- Country: Bosnia and Herzegovina
- Entity: Federation of Bosnia and Herzegovina
- Canton: Zenica-Doboj
- Municipality: Zenica

Area
  - Total: 1.16 sq mi (3.01 km^{2})

Population (2013)
  - Total: 438
  - Density: 377/sq mi (146/km^{2})
- Time zone: UTC+1 (CET)
  - Summer (DST): UTC+2 (CEST)

Puhovac (Cyrillic: Пуховац) is a village in the City of Zenica, Bosnia and Herzegovina.

== Demographics ==
According to the 2013 census, its population was 438.

Ethnicity in 2013
Ethnicity	Number	Percentage
Bosniaks	437	99.8%
other/undeclared	1	0.2%
Total	438	100%
