= Peševići =

- Village
- Location within Bosnia and Herzegovina
- Coordinates: 44.2343744°N 17.9618291°E
- Country: Bosnia and Herzegovina
- Entity: Federation of Bosnia and Herzegovina
- Canton: Zenica-Doboj
- Municipality: Zenica

Area
  - Total: 0.88 sq mi (2.28 km^{2})

Population (2013)
  - Total: 270
  - Density: 310/sq mi (120/km^{2})
- Time zone: UTC+1 (CET)
  - Summer (DST): UTC+2 (CEST)

Peševići is a village in the City of Zenica, Bosnia and Herzegovina.

== Demographics ==
According to the 2013 census, its population was 270, all Bosniaks.
