= Sheremet (disambiguation) =

Sheremet may refer to:

- Sheremet, an East Slavic surname of Turkic origin
- Sheremet (Kosovo), a locality in Kosovo
- Şeremet, Kula, a locality in Turkey
- Şeremet bey, Albanian military commander, see Battle of Ohrid

== See also ==
- Seremet
- Szeremeta
