= Sebuja =

- Village
- Location within Bosnia and Herzegovina
- Coordinates: 44.2820979°N 17.9967724°E
- Country: Bosnia and Herzegovina
- Entity: Federation of Bosnia and Herzegovina
- Canton: Zenica-Doboj
- Municipality: Zenica

Area
  - Total: 3.92 sq mi (10.15 km^{2})

Population (2013)
  - Total: 44
  - Density: 11/sq mi (4.3/km^{2})
- Time zone: UTC+1 (CET)
  - Summer (DST): UTC+2 (CEST)

Sebuja is a village in the City of Zenica, Bosnia and Herzegovina.

== Demographics ==
According to the 2013 census, its population was 44.

Ethnicity in 2013
| Ethnicity | Number | Percentage |
|---|---|---|
| Bosniaks | 42 | 95.5% |
| Serbs | 1 | 2.3% |
| other/undeclared | 1 | 2.3% |
| Total | 44 | 100% |
