= Poca, Zenica =

Poca
- Village
- Location within Bosnia and Herzegovina
- Coordinates: 44.2341605°N 17.971218°E
- Country: Bosnia and Herzegovina
- Entity: Federation of Bosnia and Herzegovina
- Canton: Zenica-Doboj
- Municipality: Zenica

Area
  - Total: 0.88 sq mi (2.29 km^{2})

Population (2013)
  - Total: 347
  - Density: 392/sq mi (152/km^{2})
- Time zone: UTC+1 (CET)
  - Summer (DST): UTC+2 (CEST)

Poca is a village in the City of Zenica, Bosnia and Herzegovina.

== Demographics ==
According to the 2013 census, its population was 347.

Ethnicity in 2013
Ethnicity	Number	Percentage
Bosniaks	322	92.8%
Croats	24	6.9%
other/undeclared	1	0.3%
Total	347	100%
