= Banloz =

Banloz Банлоз
- Village
- Location within Bosnia and Herzegovina
- Coordinates: 44°15′15″N 17°53′24″E
- Country: Bosnia and Herzegovina
- Entity: Federation of Bosnia and Herzegovina
- Canton: Zenica-Doboj
- Municipality: Zenica

Area
  - Total: 2.03 sq mi (5.25 km^{2})

Population (2013)
  - Total: 408
  - Density: 201/sq mi (77.7/km^{2})
- Time zone: UTC+1 (CET)
  - Summer (DST): UTC+2 (CEST)

Banloz (Cyrillic: Банлоз) is a village in the City of Zenica, Bosnia and Herzegovina.

== Demographics ==
According to the 2013 census, its population was 408.

Ethnicity in 2013
Ethnicity	Number	Percentage
Bosniaks	390	95.6%
Serbs	6	1.5%
Croats	2	0.5%
other/undeclared	10	2.5%
Total	408	100%
