= Vranovići, Zenica =

Vranovići
- Village
- Location within Bosnia and Herzegovina
- Coordinates: 44.251243°N 18.0021808°E
- Country: Bosnia and Herzegovina
- Entity: Federation of Bosnia and Herzegovina
- Canton: Zenica-Doboj
- Municipality: Zenica

Area
  - Total: 0.56 sq mi (1.44 km^{2})

Population (2013)
  - Total: 58
  - Density: 100/sq mi (40/km^{2})
- Time zone: UTC+1 (CET)
  - Summer (DST): UTC+2 (CEST)

Vranovići is a village in the City of Zenica, Bosnia and Herzegovina.

== Demographics ==
According to the 2013 census, its population was 58, all Bosniaks.
