= Plahovići, Zenica =

Plahovići
- Village
- Location within Bosnia and Herzegovina
- Coordinates: 44.2516374°N 17.9330656°E
- Country: Bosnia and Herzegovina
- Entity: Federation of Bosnia and Herzegovina
- Canton: Zenica-Doboj
- Municipality: Zenica

Area
  - Total: 1.05 sq mi (2.73 km^{2})

Population (2013)
  - Total: 361
  - Density: 342/sq mi (132/km^{2})
- Time zone: UTC+1 (CET)
  - Summer (DST): UTC+2 (CEST)

Plahovići is a village in the City of Zenica, Bosnia and Herzegovina.

== Demographics ==
According to the 2013 census, its population was 361.

Ethnicity in 2013
Ethnicity	Number	Percentage
Bosniaks	333	92.2%
Croats	2	0.6%
other/undeclared	26	7.2%
Total	361	100%
