= Lijeske =

- Village
- Location within Bosnia and Herzegovina
- Coordinates: 44°14′27″N 17°59′51″E
- Country: Bosnia and Herzegovina
- Entity: Federation of Bosnia and Herzegovina
- Canton: Zenica-Doboj
- Municipality: Zenica

Area
  - Total: 0.37 sq mi (0.95 km^{2})

Population (2013)
  - Total: 10
  - Density: 27/sq mi (11/km^{2})
- Time zone: UTC+1 (CET)
  - Summer (DST): UTC+2 (CEST)

Lijeske is a village in the City of Zenica, Bosnia and Herzegovina.

== Demographics ==
According to the 2013 census, its population was 10.

Ethnicity in 2013
Ethnicity	Number	Percentage
Bosniaks	5	50.0%
Croats	5	50.0%
Total	10	100%
