= Dole (Kladanj) =

- Village
- Location within Bosnia and Herzegovina
- Coordinates: 44°13′38″N 18°48′43″E
- Country: Bosnia and Herzegovina
- Entity: Republika Srpska; Federation of Bosnia and Herzegovina
- Region Canton: Bijeljina; Tuzla
- Municipality: Šekovići; Kladanj

Area
  - Total: 2.56 sq mi (6.63 km^{2})

Population (2013)
  - Total: 64
  - Density: 25/sq mi (9.7/km^{2})

Dole (Serbian Cyrillic: Доле) is a village at the entity line of Federation of B&H-Republika Srpska. In 1991, it was part of the municipality of Kladanj, Bosnia and Herzegovina. Today, it is mainly part of Šekovići, Republika Srpska. It is inhabited by ethnic Serbs.

== Demographics ==
According to the 2013 census, its population was 64, all Serbs living in the Šekovići part thus none in the Kladanj part.
