= Gornja Gračanica =

Gornja Gračanica Горња Грачаница
- Village
- Location within Bosnia and Herzegovina
- Coordinates: 44°15′39″N 17°56′32″E
- Country: Bosnia and Herzegovina
- Entity: Federation of Bosnia and Herzegovina
- Canton: Zenica-Doboj
- Municipality: Zenica

Area
  - Total: 7.67 sq mi (19.86 km^{2})

Population (2013)
  - Total: 847
  - Density: 110/sq mi (42.6/km^{2})
- Time zone: UTC+1 (CET)
  - Summer (DST): UTC+2 (CEST)

Gornja Gračanica (Cyrillic: Горња Грачаница) is a village in the City of Zenica, Bosnia and Herzegovina.

== Demographics ==
According to the 2013 census, its population was 847.

Ethnicity in 2013
Ethnicity	Number	Percentage
Bosniaks	825	97.4%
other/undeclared	22	2.6%
Total	847	100%
