= Gumanci =

Gumanci Гуманци
- Village
- Location within Bosnia and Herzegovina
- Coordinates: 44°9′0.5″N 17°54′48″E
- Country: Bosnia and Herzegovina
- Entity: Federation of Bosnia and Herzegovina
- Canton: Zenica-Doboj
- Municipality: Zenica

Area
  - Total: 1.38 sq mi (3.58 km^{2})

Population (2013)
  - Total: 4
  - Density: 2.9/sq mi (1.1/km^{2})
- Time zone: UTC+1 (CET)
  - Summer (DST): UTC+2 (CEST)

Gumanci (Cyrillic: Гуманци) is a village in the City of Zenica, Bosnia and Herzegovina.

== Demographics ==
According to the 2013 census, its population was 4, all Bosniaks.
