= Drugavci =

Drugavci Другавци
- Village
- Location within Bosnia and Herzegovina
- Coordinates: 44°14′8″N 18°0′20″E
- Country: Bosnia and Herzegovina
- Entity: Federation of Bosnia and Herzegovina
- Canton: Zenica-Doboj
- Municipality: Zenica

Area
  - Total: 0.27 sq mi (0.70 km^{2})

Population (2013)
  - Total: 264
  - Density: 980/sq mi (380/km^{2})
- Time zone: UTC+1 (CET)
  - Summer (DST): UTC+2 (CEST)

Drugavci (Cyrillic: Другавци) is a village in the City of Zenica, Bosnia and Herzegovina.

== Demographics ==
According to the 2013 census, its population was 264.

Ethnicity in 2013
| Ethnicity | Number | Percentage |
|---|---|---|
| Bosniaks | 262 | 99.2% |
| Croats | 2 | 0.8% |
| Total | 264 | 100% |
