= Pelemiši =

- Village
- Location within Bosnia and Herzegovina
- Coordinates: 44.2695717°N 18.7581682°E
- Country: Bosnia and Herzegovina
- Entity: Republika Srpska; Federation of Bosnia and Herzegovina
- Region Canton: Bijeljina; Tuzla
- Municipality: Šekovići; Kladanj

Area
  - Total: 1.64 sq mi (4.24 km^{2})

Population (2013)
  - Total: 0
  - Density: 0.0/sq mi (0.0/km^{2})

Pelemiši is a village in the municipalities of Šekovići, Republika Srpska and Kladanj, Bosnia and Herzegovina.

== Demographics ==
According to the 2013 census, its population was nil, down from 101 Serbs living in the Šekovići part in 1991.
