= Palinovići =

- Village
- Location within Bosnia and Herzegovina
- Coordinates: 44.1868834°N 18.0006715°E
- Country: Bosnia and Herzegovina
- Entity: Federation of Bosnia and Herzegovina
- Canton: Zenica-Doboj
- Municipality: Zenica

Area
  - Total: 3.31 sq mi (8.56 km^{2})

Population (2013)
  - Total: 146
  - Density: 44.2/sq mi (17.1/km^{2})
- Time zone: UTC+1 (CET)
  - Summer (DST): UTC+2 (CEST)

Palinovići is a village in the City of Zenica, Bosnia and Herzegovina.

== Demographics ==
According to the 2013 census, its population was 146.

Ethnicity in 2013
| Ethnicity | Number | Percentage |
|---|---|---|
| Bosniaks | 132 | 90.4% |
| Croats | 14 | 9.6% |
| Total | 146 | 100% |
