= TK Borac =

TK Borac ТК Борац
- Founded: 1958
- Based in: Banja Luka
- Colors
- President: Petar Trikić
- Head coach: Zoran Olić
- Website: http://www.tkborac.com

Tennis Club Borac (Serbian Cyrillic: Тениски клуб Борац) is the first tennis club established at Banja Luka, the second largest city in Bosnia and Herzegovina. The club has 6 tennis courts (4 outdoor and 2 in tennis hall). Nowadays, there are over 150 boys and girls from year 7 to 12 training in the club.

The Club hosted matches with Serbian players Nenad Zimonjić and Janko Tipsarević. Also, they co-organized match between Novak Djokovic and Viktor Troicki.
