= Jurjevići =

Jurjevići Јурјевићи
- Village
- Location within Bosnia and Herzegovina
- Coordinates: 44°14′31″N 18°0′14″E
- Country: Bosnia and Herzegovina
- Entity: Federation of Bosnia and Herzegovina
- Canton: Zenica-Doboj
- Municipality: Zenica

Area
  - Total: 1.15 sq mi (2.98 km^{2})

Population (2013)
  - Total: 115
  - Density: 99.9/sq mi (38.6/km^{2})
- Time zone: UTC+1 (CET)
  - Summer (DST): UTC+2 (CEST)

Jurjevići (Cyrillic: Јурјевићи) is a village in the City of Zenica, Bosnia and Herzegovina.

== Demographics ==
According to the 2013 census, its population was 115.

Ethnicity in 2013
Ethnicity	Number	Percentage
Bosniaks	110	95.7%
other/undeclared	5	4.3%
Total	115	100%
