= Putovičko Polje =

- Village
- Location within Bosnia and Herzegovina
- Coordinates: 44.16861°N 17.97569°E
- Country: Bosnia and Herzegovina
- Entity: Federation of Bosnia and Herzegovina
- Canton: Zenica-Doboj
- Municipality: Zenica

Area
  - Total: 0.11 sq mi (0.29 km^{2})

Population (2013)
  - Total: 361
  - Density: 3,200/sq mi (1,200/km^{2})
- Time zone: UTC+1 (CET)
  - Summer (DST): UTC+2 (CEST)

Putovičko Polje is a village in the City of Zenica, Bosnia and Herzegovina.

== Demographics ==
According to the 2013 census, its population was 361.

Ethnicity in 2013
Ethnicity	Number	Percentage
Bosniaks	359	99.4%
other/undeclared	2	0.6%
Total	361	100%
