= Kozarci =

- Village
- Location within Bosnia and Herzegovina
- Coordinates: 44.2165658°N 17.8546627°E
- Country: Bosnia and Herzegovina
- Entity: Federation of Bosnia and Herzegovina
- Canton: Zenica-Doboj
- Municipality: Zenica

Area
  - Total: 0.68 sq mi (1.76 km^{2})

Population (2013)
  - Total: 543
  - Density: 799/sq mi (309/km^{2})
- Time zone: UTC+1 (CET)
  - Summer (DST): UTC+2 (CEST)

Kozarci is a village in the City of Zenica, Bosnia and Herzegovina.

== Demographics ==
According to the 2013 census, its population was 543.

Ethnicity in 2013
Ethnicity	Number	Percentage
Bosniaks	531	97.8%
Croats	7	1.3%
Serbs	3	0.6%
other/undeclared	2	0.4%
Total	543	100%
