= Trešnjeva Glava =

- Village
- Location within Bosnia and Herzegovina
- Coordinates: 44°15′27″N 18°1′30″E
- Country: Bosnia and Herzegovina
- Entity: Federation of Bosnia and Herzegovina
- Canton: Zenica-Doboj
- Municipality: Zenica

Area
  - Total: 3.84 sq mi (9.94 km^{2})

Population (2013)
  - Total: 244
  - Density: 63.6/sq mi (24.5/km^{2})
- Time zone: UTC+1 (CET)
  - Summer (DST): UTC+2 (CEST)

Trešnjeva Glava is a village in the City of Zenica, Bosnia and Herzegovina.

== Demographics ==
According to the 2013 census, its population was 244.

Ethnicity in 2013
Ethnicity	Number	Percentage
Bosniaks	243	99.6%
other/undeclared	1	0.4%
Total	244	100%
