= Gornja Zenica =

Gornja Zenica Горња Зеница
- Village
- Location within Bosnia and Herzegovina
- Coordinates: 44°10′25″N 17°54′11″E
- Country: Bosnia and Herzegovina
- Entity: Federation of Bosnia and Herzegovina
- Canton: Zenica-Doboj
- Municipality: Zenica

Area
  - Total: 2.19 sq mi (5.67 km^{2})

Population (2013)
  - Total: 1,893
  - Density: 865/sq mi (334/km^{2})
- Time zone: UTC+1 (CET)
  - Summer (DST): UTC+2 (CEST)

Gornja Zenica (Cyrillic: Горња Зеница) is a village in the City of Zenica, Bosnia and Herzegovina.

== Demographics ==
According to the 2013 census, its population was 1,893.

Ethnicity in 2013
Ethnicity	Number	Percentage
Bosniaks	1,583	83.6%
Croats	223	11.8%
Serbs	13	0.7%
other/undeclared	74	3.9%
Total	1,893	100%
