= Putovići =

Putovići Путовићи
- Village
- Location within Bosnia and Herzegovina
- Coordinates: 44°9′39″N 17°58′19″E
- Country: Bosnia and Herzegovina
- Entity: Federation of Bosnia and Herzegovina
- Canton: Zenica-Doboj
- Municipality: Zenica

Area
  - Total: 1.24 sq mi (3.20 km^{2})

Population (2013)
  - Total: 823
  - Density: 666/sq mi (257/km^{2})
- Time zone: UTC+1 (CET)
  - Summer (DST): UTC+2 (CEST)

Putovići (Cyrillic: Путовићи) is a village in the City of Zenica, Bosnia and Herzegovina.

== Demographics ==
According to the 2013 census, its population was 823.

Ethnicity in 2013
Ethnicity	Number	Percentage
Bosniaks	769	93.4%
Croats	3	0.4%
Serbs	1	0.1%
other/undeclared	50	6.1%
Total	823	100%
