= Jelačić =

Jelačić is a surname. Notable people with the surname include:

- House of Jelačić, Croatian noble family
- Aleksije Jelačić (1892–1941), Serbian historian of Croatian descent
- Franjo Jelačić (1746–1810), Croatian nobleman
- Josip Jelačić (1801–1859), Croatian nobleman and general

== See also ==
- Jelačići (disambiguation)
