= Vučinići, Bosnia and Herzegovina =

Vučinići
- Village
- Location within Bosnia and Herzegovina
- Coordinates: 44.2106835°N 18.7105787°E
- Country: Bosnia and Herzegovina
- Entity: Federation of Bosnia and Herzegovina
- Canton: Tuzla
- Municipality: Kladanj

Area
  - Total: 2.63 sq mi (6.80 km^{2})

Population (2013)
  - Total: 3
  - Density: 1.1/sq mi (0.44/km^{2})

Vučinići is a village in the municipality of Kladanj, Bosnia and Herzegovina.

== Demographics ==
According to the 2013 census, its population was 3, all Serbs.
