= Donja Vraca =

Donja Vraca Доња Враца
- Village
- Location within Bosnia and Herzegovina
- Coordinates: 44°15′14″N 17°52′50″E
- Country: Bosnia and Herzegovina
- Entity: Federation of Bosnia and Herzegovina
- Canton: Zenica-Doboj
- Municipality: Zenica

Area
  - Total: 3.35 sq mi (8.68 km^{2})

Population (2013)
  - Total: 828
  - Density: 247/sq mi (95.4/km^{2})
- Time zone: UTC+1 (CET)
  - Summer (DST): UTC+2 (CEST)

Donja Vraca (Cyrillic: Доња Враца) is a village in the City of Zenica, Bosnia and Herzegovina.

== Demographics ==
According to the 2013 census, its population was 828.

Ethnicity in 2013
Ethnicity	Number	Percentage
Bosniaks	819	98.9%
Croats	1	0.1%
other/undeclared	8	1.0%
Total	828	100%
