= Seremet =

Seremet is a surname, a variant of Šeremet. Notable people with the surname include:

- Dino Seremet (born 1980), Slovenian footballer
- Mark E. Seremet (born 1965), American businessman

== See also ==
- Szeremeta
- Sheremet (disambiguation)
