= Smajići =

- Village
- Location within Bosnia and Herzegovina
- Coordinates: 44.3508789°N 17.8833467°E
- Country: Bosnia and Herzegovina
- Entity: Federation of Bosnia and Herzegovina
- Canton: Zenica-Doboj
- Municipality: Zenica

Area
  - Total: 1.40 sq mi (3.63 km^{2})

Population (2013)
  - Total: 336
  - Density: 240/sq mi (92.6/km^{2})
- Time zone: UTC+1 (CET)
  - Summer (DST): UTC+2 (CEST)

Smajići is a village in the City of Zenica, Bosnia and Herzegovina.

== Demographics ==
According to the 2013 census, its population was 336.

Ethnicity in 2013
Ethnicity	Number	Percentage
Bosniaks	331	98.5%
other/undeclared	5	1.5%
Total	336	100%
