= Dobriljevo =

Dobriljevo Добриљево
- Village
- Location within Bosnia and Herzegovina
- Coordinates: 44°10′31″N 17°53′13″E
- Country: Bosnia and Herzegovina
- Entity: Federation of Bosnia and Herzegovina
- Canton: Zenica-Doboj
- Municipality: Zenica

Area
  - Total: 1.60 sq mi (4.14 km^{2})

Population (2013)
  - Total: 530
  - Density: 330/sq mi (130/km^{2})
- Time zone: UTC+1 (CET)
  - Summer (DST): UTC+2 (CEST)

Dobriljevo (Cyrillic: Добриљево) is a village in the City of Zenica, Bosnia and Herzegovina.

== Demographics ==
According to the 2013 census, its population was 530.

Ethnicity in 2013
Ethnicity	Number	Percentage
Bosniaks	460	86.8%
Croats	57	10.8%
Serbs	4	0.8%
other/undeclared	9	1.7%
Total	530	100%
