= Prijanovići =

Prijanovići may refer to:

- Prijanovići, Serbia, a village near Požega
- Prijanovići, Bosnia and Herzegovina, a village near Kladanj
