= Živkovići =

- Village
- Location within Bosnia and Herzegovina
- Coordinates: 44.2445995°N 18.0536883°E
- Country: Bosnia and Herzegovina
- Entity: Federation of Bosnia and Herzegovina
- Canton: Zenica-Doboj
- Municipality: Zenica

Area
  - Total: 4.16 sq mi (10.77 km^{2})

Population (2013)
  - Total: 92
  - Density: 22/sq mi (8.5/km^{2})
- Time zone: UTC+1 (CET)
  - Summer (DST): UTC+2 (CEST)

Živkovići is a village in the City of Zenica, Bosnia and Herzegovina.

== Demographics ==
According to the 2013 census, its population was 92.

Ethnicity in 2013
Ethnicity	Number	Percentage
Bosniaks	89	96.7%
other/undeclared	3	3.3%
Total	92	100%
