= Šerići, Zenica =

Šerići
- Village
- Location within Bosnia and Herzegovina
- Coordinates: 44.3570929°N 17.8101595°E
- Country: Bosnia and Herzegovina
- Entity: Federation of Bosnia and Herzegovina
- Canton: Zenica-Doboj
- Municipality: Zenica

Area
  - Total: 13.72 sq mi (35.54 km^{2})

Population (2013)
  - Total: 1,332
  - Density: 97.07/sq mi (37.48/km^{2})
- Time zone: UTC+1 (CET)
  - Summer (DST): UTC+2 (CEST)

Šerići is a village in the City of Zenica, Bosnia and Herzegovina.

== Demographics ==
According to the 2013 census, its population was 1,332.

Ethnicity in 2013
Ethnicity	Number	Percentage
Bosniaks	1,325	99.5%
other/undeclared	7	0.5%
Total	1,332	100%
