= Brlošci =

- Village
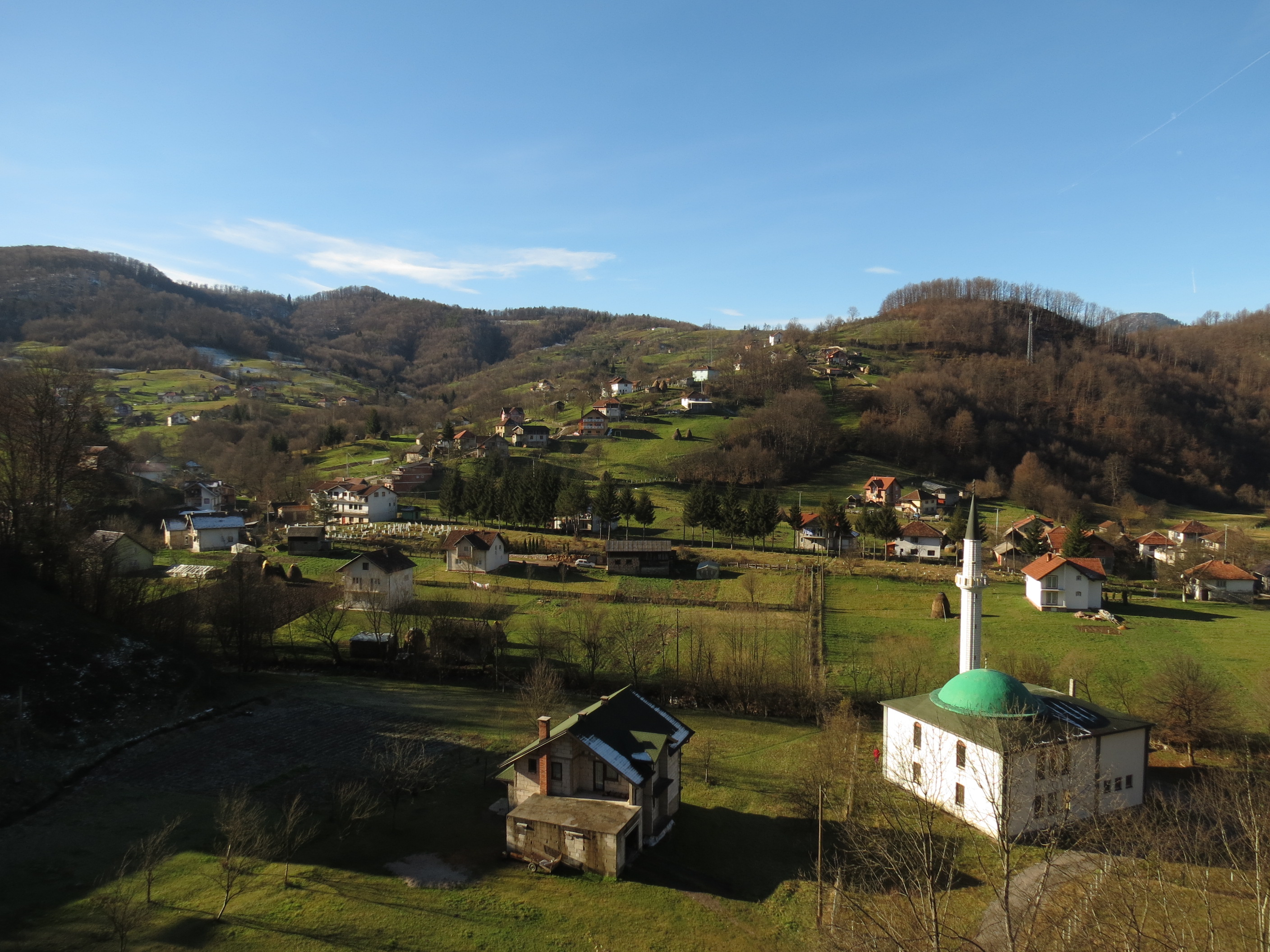

- Location within Bosnia and Herzegovina
- Coordinates: 44°17′05″N 18°42′19″E
- Country: Bosnia and Herzegovina
- Entity: Federation of Bosnia and Herzegovina
- Canton: Tuzla
- Municipality: Kladanj

Area
  - Total: 2.93 sq mi (7.60 km^{2})

Population (2013)
  - Total: 439
  - Density: 150/sq mi (57.8/km^{2})

Brlošci is a village in the municipality of Kladanj, Bosnia and Herzegovina.

== Demographics ==
According to the 2013 census, its population was 439.

Ethnicity in 2013
Ethnicity	Number	Percentage
Bosniaks	437	99.5%
other/undeclared	2	0.5%
Total	439	100%
