= Crijevčići =

- Village
- Location within Bosnia and Herzegovina
- Coordinates: 44°20′53″N 18°41′02″E
- Country: Bosnia and Herzegovina
- Entity: Federation of Bosnia and Herzegovina
- Canton: Tuzla
- Municipality: Kladanj

Area
  - Total: 0.98 sq mi (2.55 km^{2})

Population (2013)
  - Total: 255
  - Density: 259/sq mi (100/km^{2})

Crijevčići is a village in the municipality of Kladanj, Bosnia and Herzegovina.

== Demographics ==
According to the 2013 census, its population was 255, all Bosniaks.
