= Starić =

- Village
- Location within Bosnia and Herzegovina
- Coordinates: 44.2299252°N 18.7489518°E
- Country: Bosnia and Herzegovina
- Entity: Federation of Bosnia and Herzegovina
- Canton: Tuzla
- Municipality: Kladanj

Area
  - Total: 2.39 sq mi (6.18 km^{2})

Population (2013)
  - Total: 470
  - Density: 200/sq mi (76/km^{2})

Starić is a village in the municipality of Kladanj, Bosnia and Herzegovina.

== Demographics ==
According to the 2013 census, its population was 470.

Ethnicity in 2013
Ethnicity	Number	Percentage
Bosniaks	444	94.5%
Serbs	21	4.5%
Croats	1	0.2%
other/undeclared	4	0.9%
Total	470	100%
