= Jelačići, Kladanj =

Jelačići Јелачићи
- Village
- Location within Bosnia and Herzegovina
- Coordinates: 44°18′40″N 18°44′03″E
- Country: Bosnia and Herzegovina
- Entity: Republika Srpska; Federation of Bosnia and Herzegovina
- Region Canton: Bijeljina; Tuzla
- Municipality: Šekovići; Kladanj

Area
  - Total: 2.95 sq mi (7.63 km^{2})

Population (2013)
  - Total: 5
  - Density: 1.7/sq mi (0.66/km^{2})

Jelačići (Cyrillic: Јелачићи) is a village in the municipalities of Šekovići (Republika Srpska) and Kladanj, Bosnia and Herzegovina.

== Demographics ==
According to the 2013 census, its population was 5, all Serbs living in the Šekovići part thus none in the Kladanj part.
