= Pauč =

- Village
- Location within Bosnia and Herzegovina
- Coordinates: 44.2479597°N 18.6248433°E
- Country: Bosnia and Herzegovina
- Entity: Federation of Bosnia and Herzegovina
- Canton: Tuzla
- Municipality: Kladanj

Area
  - Total: 13.08 sq mi (33.87 km^{2})

Population (2013)
  - Total: 231
  - Density: 17.7/sq mi (6.82/km^{2})

Pauč is a village in the municipality of Kladanj, Bosnia and Herzegovina.

== Demographics ==
According to the 2013 census, its population was 231.

Ethnicity in 2013
| Ethnicity | Number | Percentage |
|---|---|---|
| Bosniaks | 229 | 99.1% |
| other/undeclared | 2 | 0.9% |
| Total | 231 | 100% |
