= Kovačići (Kladanj) =

Kovačići Ковачићи
- Village
- Location within Bosnia and Herzegovina
- Coordinates: 44°11′46″N 18°41′15″E
- Country: Bosnia and Herzegovina
- Entity: Federation of Bosnia and Herzegovina
- Canton: Tuzla
- Municipality: Kladanj

Area
  - Total: 4.07 sq mi (10.53 km^{2})

Population (2013)
  - Total: 0
  - Density: 0.0/sq mi (0.0/km^{2})

Kovačići (Cyrillic: Ковачићи) is a village in the municipality of Kladanj, Bosnia and Herzegovina.

== Demographics ==
According to the 2013 census, its population was nil, down from 83 in 1991.
