= Szeremeta =

Szeremeta is a Ukrainian and Polish surname. It's believed to have derived from the Ukrainian word "sheremet," which can be interpreted as "wanderer" or "roamer". The name also has variations like Sheremeta and Sheremet.

- Julia Szeremeta (born 2003), Polish boxer
- Kamil Szeremeta (born 1989), Polish boxer
- Nic Szeremeta (1943–2021), Polish poker player
- Ryszard Szeremeta (born 1952), Polish composer and singer

== See also ==
- Šeremet
- Seremet
- Sheremet (disambiguation)
