= Buševo =

- Village
- Location within Bosnia and Herzegovina
- Coordinates: 44°14′00″N 18°40′55″E
- Country: Bosnia and Herzegovina
- Entity: Federation of Bosnia and Herzegovina
- Canton: Tuzla
- Municipality: Kladanj

Area
  - Total: 1.03 sq mi (2.68 km^{2})

Population (2013)
  - Total: 130
  - Density: 130/sq mi (49/km^{2})
- Area code: 035

Buševo is a village in the municipality of Kladanj, Bosnia and Herzegovina.

== Climate ==
The climate in Buševo is warm and temperate. Buševo gets a high amount of rainfall totaling 92.6 cm per year.

== Demographics ==
According to the 2013 census, its population was 130.

Ethnicity in 2013
Ethnicity	Number	Percentage
Bosniaks	122	93.8%
Croats	2	1.5%
Serbs	1	0.8%
other/undeclared	5	3.8%
Total	130	100%
