= Novo Naselje - Stupari =

Novo Naselje-Stupari
- Village
- Location within Bosnia and Herzegovina
- Coordinates: 44.3112739°N 18.6704042°E
- Country: Bosnia and Herzegovina
- Entity: Federation of Bosnia and Herzegovina
- Canton: Tuzla
- Municipality: Kladanj

Area
  - Total: 0.41 sq mi (1.07 km^{2})

Population (2013)
  - Total: 274
  - Density: 663/sq mi (256/km^{2})

Novo Naselje - Stupari is a village in the municipality of Kladanj, Bosnia and Herzegovina.

== Demographics ==
According to the 2013 census, its population was 274.

Ethnicity in 2013
Ethnicity	Number	Percentage
Bosniaks	269	98.2%
other/undeclared	5	1.8%
Total	274	100%
