= Sheremet =

Sheremet (Russian or Ukrainian: Шеремет) is a gender-neutral Slavic surname of Turkic origin. In Russian usage it originates from Andrei Sheremet, who gave rise to the noble family of Sheremetev in the 16th century. It may refer to:

- Anna Sheremet (born 2001), Ukrainian rower
- Julia Sheremet (born 1988), Belarusian figure skater
- Liudmyla Sheremet (1942–2020), Ukrainian anesthesiologist and activist
- Mikhail Sheremet (born 1971), Russian politician
- Nikita Sheremet (born 2007), Ukrainian swimmer
- Pavel Sheremet (1971–2016), Belarusian, Russian and Ukrainian journalist

== See also ==
- Szeremeta
