= Plahovići, Kladanj =

Plahovići
- Village
- Location within Bosnia and Herzegovina
- Coordinates: 44.2322891°N 18.6655645°E
- Country: Bosnia and Herzegovina
- Entity: Federation of Bosnia and Herzegovina
- Canton: Tuzla
- Municipality: Kladanj

Area
  - Total: 1.78 sq mi (4.62 km^{2})

Population (2013)
  - Total: 415
  - Density: 233/sq mi (89.8/km^{2})

Plahovići is a village in the municipality of Kladanj, Bosnia and Herzegovina.

== Demographics ==
According to the 2013 census, its population was 415.

Ethnicity in 2013
Ethnicity	Number	Percentage
Bosniaks	405	97.6%
Croats	1	0.2%
other/undeclared	9	2.2%
Total	415	100%
