= Mladovo =

- Village
- Location within Bosnia and Herzegovina
- Coordinates: 44.2530115°N 18.6725257°E
- Country: Bosnia and Herzegovina
- Entity: Federation of Bosnia and Herzegovina
- Canton: Tuzla
- Municipality: Kladanj

Area
  - Total: 2.22 sq mi (5.75 km^{2})

Population (2013)
  - Total: 0
  - Density: 0.0/sq mi (0.0/km^{2})

Mladovo is a village in the municipality of Kladanj, Bosnia and Herzegovina.

== Demographics ==
According to the 2013 census, its population was nil, down from 64 in 1991.
