= Brgule (Kladanj) =

- Village
- Location within Bosnia and Herzegovina
- Coordinates: 44°20′42″N 18°43′35″E
- Country: Bosnia and Herzegovina
- Entity: Federation of Bosnia and Herzegovina
- Canton: Tuzla
- Municipality: Kladanj

Area
  - Total: 1.54 sq mi (3.98 km^{2})

Population (2013)
  - Total: 58
  - Density: 38/sq mi (15/km^{2})

Brgule is a village in the municipality of Kladanj, Bosnia and Herzegovina.

== Demographics ==
According to the 2013 census, its population was 58, all Bosniaks.
