= Olovci =

- Village
- Location within Bosnia and Herzegovina
- Coordinates: 44.2891403°N 18.6507777°E
- Country: Bosnia and Herzegovina
- Entity: Federation of Bosnia and Herzegovina
- Canton: Tuzla
- Municipality: Kladanj

Area
  - Total: 3.66 sq mi (9.48 km^{2})

Population (2013)
  - Total: 4
  - Density: 1.1/sq mi (0.42/km^{2})

Olovci is a village in the municipality of Kladanj, Bosnia and Herzegovina.

== Demographics ==
According to the 2013 census, its population was 4, all Serbs.
