= Lupoglavo =

- Village
- Location within Bosnia and Herzegovina
- Coordinates: 44°13′22″N 18°38′19″E
- Country: Bosnia and Herzegovina
- Entity: Federation of Bosnia and Herzegovina
- Canton: Tuzla
- Municipality: Kladanj

Area
  - Total: 1.95 sq mi (5.06 km^{2})

Population (2013)
  - Total: 1
  - Density: 0.51/sq mi (0.20/km^{2})

Lupoglavo is a village in the municipality of Kladanj, Bosnia and Herzegovina.

== Demographics ==
According to the 2013 census, its population was just 1, a Bosniak.
