= Konjevići (Kladanj) =

Konjevići Коњевићи
- Village
- Location within Bosnia and Herzegovina
- Coordinates: 44°11′26″N 18°42′57″E
- Country: Bosnia and Herzegovina
- Entity: Federation of Bosnia and Herzegovina
- Canton: Tuzla
- Municipality: Kladanj

Area
  - Total: 3.59 sq mi (9.30 km^{2})

Population (2013)
  - Total: 1
  - Density: 0.28/sq mi (0.11/km^{2})

Konjevići (Cyrillic: Коњевићи) is a village in the municipality of Kladanj, Bosnia and Herzegovina.

== Demographics ==
According to the 2013 census, its population was just 1, a Bosniak.
