= Krivajevići, Kladanj =

Krivajevići
- Village
- Location within Bosnia and Herzegovina
- Coordinates: 44.3017255°N 18.7085438°E
- Country: Bosnia and Herzegovina
- Entity: Federation of Bosnia and Herzegovina
- Canton: Tuzla
- Municipality: Kladanj

Area
  - Total: 1.95 sq mi (5.04 km^{2})

Population (2013)
  - Total: 201
  - Density: 103/sq mi (39.9/km^{2})

Krivajevići is a village in the municipality of Kladanj, Bosnia and Herzegovina.

== Demographics ==
According to the 2013 census, its population was 201.

Ethnicity in 2013
Ethnicity	Number	Percentage
Bosniaks	191	95.0%
Croats	1	0.5%
Serbs	0	0.0%
other/undeclared	9	4.5%
Total	201	100%
