= Brateljevići =

Village in Bosnia and Herzegovina

- Village
- Location within Bosnia and Herzegovina
- Coordinates: 44°13′22″N 18°38′19″E
- Country: Bosnia and Herzegovina
- Entity: Federation of Bosnia and Herzegovina
- Canton: Tuzla
- Municipality: Kladanj

Area
  - Total: 8.22 sq mi (21.28 km^{2})

Population (2013)
  - Total: 406
  - Density: 49.4/sq mi (19.1/km^{2})

Brateljevići is a village in the municipality of Kladanj, Bosnia and Herzegovina.

== Demographics ==
According to the 2013 census, its population was 406.

Ethnicity in 2013
Ethnicity	Number	Percentage
Bosniaks	393	96.8%
Croats	1	0.2%
other/undeclared	12	3.0%
Total	406	100%
