= Goletići =

- Village
- Location within Bosnia and Herzegovina
- Coordinates: 44°16′31″N 18°37′33″E
- Country: Bosnia and Herzegovina
- Entity: Federation of Bosnia and Herzegovina
- Canton: Tuzla
- Municipality: Kladanj

Area
  - Total: 7.96 sq mi (20.61 km^{2})

Population (2013)
  - Total: 126
  - Density: 15.8/sq mi (6.11/km^{2})

Goletići is a village in the municipality of Kladanj, Bosnia and Herzegovina.

== Demographics ==
According to the 2013 census, its population was 126, all Bosniaks.
