= Ravne, Kladanj =

Ravne
- Village
- Location within Bosnia and Herzegovina
- Coordinates: 44.2256555°N 18.7642928°E
- Country: Bosnia and Herzegovina
- Entity: Federation of Bosnia and Herzegovina
- Canton: Tuzla
- Municipality: Kladanj

Area
  - Total: 5.03 sq mi (13.02 km^{2})

Population (2013)
  - Total: 406
  - Density: 80.8/sq mi (31.2/km^{2})

Ravne is a village in the municipality of Kladanj, Bosnia and Herzegovina.

== Demographics ==
According to the 2013 census, its population was 406.

Ethnicity in 2013
Ethnicity	Number	Percentage
Bosniaks	405	99.8%
other/undeclared	1	0.2%
Total	406	100%
