= Noćajevići =

- Village
- Location within Bosnia and Herzegovina
- Coordinates: 44.3217406°N 18.7044624°E
- Country: Bosnia and Herzegovina
- Entity: Federation of Bosnia and Herzegovina
- Canton: Tuzla
- Municipality: Kladanj

Area
  - Total: 2.75 sq mi (7.13 km^{2})

Population (2013)
  - Total: 600
  - Density: 220/sq mi (84/km^{2})

Noćajevići is a village in the municipality of Kladanj, Bosnia and Herzegovina.

== Demographics ==
According to the 2013 census, its population was 600, all Bosniaks.
