= Gladovići (Zenica) =

Gladovići Гладовићи
- Village
- Location within Bosnia and Herzegovina
- Coordinates: 44°18′1″N 17°55′42″E
- Country: Bosnia and Herzegovina
- Entity: Federation of Bosnia and Herzegovina
- Canton: Zenica-Doboj
- Municipality: Zenica

Area
  - Total: 3.83 sq mi (9.92 km^{2})
- Elevation: 2,790 ft (850 m)

Population (2013)
  - Total: 488
  - Density: 127/sq mi (49.2/km^{2})
- Time zone: UTC+1 (CET)
  - Summer (DST): UTC+2 (CEST)

Gladovići (Cyrillic: Гладовићи) is a village in the City of Zenica, Bosnia and Herzegovina.

== Demographics ==
According to the 2013 census, its population was 488.

Ethnicity in 2013
Ethnicity	Number	Percentage
Bosniaks	484	99.2%
other/undeclared	4	0.8%
Total	488	100%
