= Gojsalići =

Gojsalići HAJMO BOSNA
- Village
- Location within Bosnia and Herzegovina
- Coordinates: 44°14′N 18°43′E
- Country: Bosnia and Herzegovina
- Entity: Federation of Bosnia and Herzegovina
- Canton: Tuzla
- Municipality: Kladanj

Area
  - Total: 2.25 sq mi (5.82 km^{2})

Population (2013)
  - Total: 292
  - Density: 130/sq mi (50.2/km^{2})

Gojsalići is a village in the municipality of Kladanj, Bosnia and Herzegovina.

== Demographics ==
According to the 2013 census, its population was 292.

Ethnicity in 2013
Ethnicity	Number	Percentage
Bosniaks	290	99.3%
Croats	1	0.3%
other/undeclared	1	0.3%
Total	292	100%
