= Vranovići, Kladanj =

Vranovići
- Village
- Location within Bosnia and Herzegovina
- Coordinates: 44.2508568°N 18.6578753°E
- Country: Bosnia and Herzegovina
- Entity: Federation of Bosnia and Herzegovina
- Canton: Tuzla
- Municipality: Kladanj

Area
  - Total: 2.10 sq mi (5.45 km^{2})

Population (2013)
  - Total: 8
  - Density: 3.8/sq mi (1.5/km^{2})

Vranovići is a village in the municipality of Kladanj, Bosnia and Herzegovina.

== Demographics ==
According to the 2013 census, its population was 8.

Ethnicity in 2013
Ethnicity	Number	Percentage
Serbs	5	62.5%
Bosniaks	3	37.5%
Total	8	100%
