= List of settlements in the Federation of Bosnia and Herzegovina =

The List of settlements in the Federation of Bosnia and Herzegovina is split into a separate page for each initial letter.

== See also ==
- List of populated places in Bosnia and Herzegovina
- List of cities in Bosnia and Herzegovina
- Municipalities of Bosnia and Herzegovina
- Municipalities of Republika Srpska
