= Pepići =

- Village
- Location within Bosnia and Herzegovina
- Coordinates: 44.2538976°N 18.7499085°E
- Country: Bosnia and Herzegovina
- Entity: Federation of Bosnia and Herzegovina
- Canton: Tuzla
- Municipality: Kladanj

Area
  - Total: 1.78 sq mi (4.60 km^{2})

Population (2013)
  - Total: 1
  - Density: 0.56/sq mi (0.22/km^{2})

Pepići is a village in the municipality of Kladanj, Bosnia and Herzegovina.

== Demographics ==
According to the 2013 census, its population was just 1, a Serb.
