= Stupari - Selo =

- Village
- Location within Bosnia and Herzegovina
- Coordinates: 44.3143671°N 18.6754164°E
- Country: Bosnia and Herzegovina
- Entity: Federation of Bosnia and Herzegovina
- Canton: Tuzla
- Municipality: Kladanj

Area
  - Total: 1.30 sq mi (3.36 km^{2})

Population (2013)
  - Total: 685
  - Density: 528/sq mi (204/km^{2})

Stupari - Selo is a village in the municipality of Kladanj, Bosnia and Herzegovina.

== Demographics ==
According to the 2013 census, its population was 685.

Ethnicity in 2013
Ethnicity	Number	Percentage
Bosniaks	676	98.7%
Serbs	3	0.4%
other/undeclared	6	0.9%
Total	685	100%
