= Stupari - Centar =

- Village
- Location within Bosnia and Herzegovina
- Coordinates: 44.3118382°N 18.6755294°E
- Country: Bosnia and Herzegovina
- Entity: Federation of Bosnia and Herzegovina
- Canton: Tuzla
- Municipality: Kladanj

Area
  - Total: 0.36 sq mi (0.92 km^{2})

Population (2013)
  - Total: 282
  - Density: 790/sq mi (310/km^{2})

Stupari - Centar is a village in the municipality of Kladanj, Bosnia and Herzegovina.

== Demographics ==
According to the 2013 census, its population was 282.

Ethnicity in 2013
| Ethnicity | Number | Percentage |
|---|---|---|
| Bosniaks | 276 | 97.9% |
| Serbs | 6 | 2.1% |
| Total | 282 | 100% |
