= Tarevo =

- Village
- Location within Bosnia and Herzegovina
- Coordinates: 44.3206707°N 18.6607564°E
- Country: Bosnia and Herzegovina
- Entity: Federation of Bosnia and Herzegovina
- Canton: Tuzla
- Municipality: Kladanj

Area
  - Total: 6.58 sq mi (17.03 km^{2})

Population (2013)
  - Total: 824
  - Density: 125/sq mi (48.4/km^{2})

Tarevo is a village in the municipality of Kladanj, Bosnia and Herzegovina.

== Demographics ==
According to the 2013 census, its population was 824, all Bosniaks.
