= Rujići =

- Village
- Location within Bosnia and Herzegovina
- Coordinates: 44.3046479°N 18.70032°E
- Country: Bosnia and Herzegovina
- Entity: Federation of Bosnia and Herzegovina
- Canton: Tuzla
- Municipality: Kladanj

Area
  - Total: 0.64 sq mi (1.66 km^{2})

Population (2013)
  - Total: 308
  - Density: 481/sq mi (186/km^{2})

Rujići is a village in the municipality of Kladanj, Bosnia and Herzegovina.

== Demographics ==
According to the 2013 census, its population was 308.

Ethnicity in 2013
Ethnicity	Number	Percentage
Bosniaks	307	99.7%
Croats	1	0.3%
Total	308	100%
