= Suljići =

- Village
- Location within Bosnia and Herzegovina
- Coordinates: 44.2684347°N 18.6263104°E
- Country: Bosnia and Herzegovina
- Entity: Federation of Bosnia and Herzegovina
- Canton: Tuzla
- Municipality: Kladanj

Area
  - Total: 0.92 sq mi (2.38 km^{2})

Population (2013)
  - Total: 142
  - Density: 155/sq mi (59.7/km^{2})

Suljići is a village in the municipality of Kladanj, Bosnia and Herzegovina.

== Demographics ==
According to the 2013 census, its population was 142.

Ethnicity in 2013
Ethnicity	Number	Percentage
Bosniaks	141	99.3%
other/undeclared	1	0.7%
Total	142	100%
