= Prijanovići, Bosnia and Herzegovina =

Prijanovići
- Village
- Location within Bosnia and Herzegovina
- Coordinates: 44.3094517°N 18.6831055°E
- Country: Bosnia and Herzegovina
- Entity: Federation of Bosnia and Herzegovina
- Canton: Tuzla
- Municipality: Kladanj

Area
  - Total: 0.83 sq mi (2.15 km^{2})

Population (2013)
  - Total: 431
  - Density: 519/sq mi (200/km^{2})

Prijanovići is a village in the municipality of Kladanj, Bosnia and Herzegovina.

== Demographics ==
According to the 1991 census, its population was 513. According to the 2013 census, its population was 431.

Ethnicity in 1991
Ethnicity	Number	Percentage
Bosniaks	447	87.1%
Croats	1	0.2%
Serbs	61	11.9%
Yugoslavs	4	0.8%
Total	513	100%

Ethnicity in 2013
Ethnicity	Number	Percentage
Bosniaks	425	98.6%
Croats	1	0.2%
other/undeclared	5	1.2%
Total	431	100%
