= Gojakovići, Kladanj =

Gojakovići
- Village
- Location within Bosnia and Herzegovina
- Coordinates: 44°16′N 18°44′E
- Country: Bosnia and Herzegovina
- Entity: Federation of Bosnia and Herzegovina
- Canton: Tuzla
- Municipality: Kladanj

Area
  - Total: 4.10 sq mi (10.61 km^{2})

Population (2013)
  - Total: 442
  - Density: 108/sq mi (41.7/km^{2})

Gojakovići is a village in the municipality of Kladanj, Bosnia and Herzegovina.

== Demographics ==
According to the 2013 census, its population was 442.

Ethnicity in 2013
Ethnicity	Number	Percentage
Bosniaks	441	99.8%
Serbs	1	0.2%
Total	442	100%
