= Zagrađe, Kladanj =

Zagrađe Заграђе
- Village
- Location within Bosnia and Herzegovina
- Coordinates: 44.2320105°N 18.6164161°E
- Country: Bosnia and Herzegovina
- Entity: Federation of Bosnia and Herzegovina
- Canton: Tuzla
- Municipality: Kladanj

Area
  - Total: 1.02 sq mi (2.65 km^{2})

Population (2013)
  - Total: 91
  - Density: 89/sq mi (34/km^{2})

Zagrađe is a village in the municipality of Kladanj, Bosnia and Herzegovina.

== Demographics ==
According to the 2013 census, its population was 91.

Ethnicity in 2013
| Ethnicity | Number | Percentage |
|---|---|---|
| Bosniaks | 90 | 98.9% |
| other/undeclared | 1 | 1.1% |
| Total | 91 | 100% |
