= Prijevor, Kladanj =

Prijevor
- Village
- Location within Bosnia and Herzegovina
- Coordinates: 44.2329345°N 18.764757°E
- Country: Bosnia and Herzegovina
- Entity: Federation of Bosnia and Herzegovina
- Canton: Tuzla
- Municipality: Kladanj

Area
  - Total: 1.44 sq mi (3.73 km^{2})

Population (2013)
  - Total: 137
  - Density: 95.1/sq mi (36.7/km^{2})

Prijevor is a village in the municipality of Kladanj, Bosnia and Herzegovina.

== Demographics ==
According to the 2013 census, its population was 137.

Ethnicity in 2013
| Ethnicity | Number | Percentage |
|---|---|---|
| Bosniaks | 135 | 98.5% |
| other/undeclared | 2 | 1.5% |
| Total | 137 | 100% |
