= Zagrađe, Travnik =

Zagrađe
- Village
- Location within Bosnia and Herzegovina
- Coordinates: 44.2887754°N 17.7382416°E
- Country: Bosnia and Herzegovina
- Entity: Federation of Bosnia and Herzegovina
- Canton: Central Bosnia
- Municipality: Travnik

Area
  - Total: 0.92 sq mi (2.39 km^{2})

Population (2013)
  - Total: 447
  - Density: 484/sq mi (187/km^{2})
- Time zone: UTC+1 (CET)
  - Summer (DST): UTC+2 (CEST)

Zagrađe is a village in the municipality of Travnik, Bosnia and Herzegovina.

== Demographics ==
According to the 2013 census, its population was 447.

Ethnicity in 2013
Ethnicity	Number	Percentage
Bosniaks	444	99.3%
other/undeclared	3	0.7%
Total	447	100%
