= Municipalities of Republika Srpska =

Administrative divisions in Republika Srpska, Bosnia and Herzegovina

Municipalities of Republika Srpska (light blue)

Under the "Law on Territorial Organization and Local Self-Government" adopted in 1994, Republika Srpska was divided into 80 municipalities. After the conclusion of the Dayton Peace Agreement, the law was amended in 1996 to reflect the changes to the entity's borders and now provides for the division of Republika Srpska into 64 municipalities.

== List of municipalities ==
The following list includes 64 municipalities of Republika Srpska (with population data from 2013 census):

City / town	Region	Area (km^{2})	Municipal population	Urban population					
City / town	Region	Area (km^{2})	Municipal population	Urban population	Banja Luka	Banja Luka	1,239	185,042	150,997
Bijeljina	Doboj-Bijeljina	734	107,715	45,291					
Prijedor	Banja Luka	834	89,397	32,342					
Doboj	Doboj-Bijeljina	772	71,441	26,987					
Istočno Sarajevo	Istočno Sarajevo-Zvornik	1,450	61,516	43,657					
Zvornik	Istočno Sarajevo-Zvornik	376	58,856	12,674					
Gradiška	Banja Luka	762	51,727	16,106					
Teslić	Doboj-Bijeljina	838	38,536	7,518					
Prnjavor	Banja Luka	762	38,399	8,484					
Laktaši	Banja Luka	388	34,966	5,879					
Trebinje	Trebinje-Foča	904	29,918	25,589					
Derventa	Doboj-Bijeljina	515	27,404	12,680					
Novi Grad	Banja Luka	473	27,115	11,063					
Modriča	Doboj-Bijeljina	320	25,712	10,137					
Kozarska Dubica	Banja Luka	499	21,542	11,566					
Pale	Istočno Sarajevo-Zvornik	493	20,909	13,883					
Bratunac	Istočno Sarajevo-Zvornik	293	20,340	8,359					
Kotor Varoš	Banja Luka	564	19,710	8,360					
Foča	Trebinje-Foča	1,135	18,288	12,334					
Srbac	Banja Luka	453	17,587	3,005					
Šamac	Doboj-Bijeljina	178	17,273	5,390					
Mrkonjić Grad	Banja Luka	677	16,671	7,915					
Brod	Doboj-Bijeljina	229	16,619	8,563					
Ugljevik	Doboj-Bijeljina	165	15,710	4,155					
Čelinac	Banja Luka	362	15,548	5,802					
Lopare	Doboj-Bijeljina	293	15,357	2,709					
Istočna Ilidža	Istočno Sarajevo-Zvornik	28	14,763	14,241					
Srebrenica	Istočno Sarajevo-Zvornik	527	13,409	2,607					
Nevesinje	Trebinje-Foča	877	12,961	5,464					
Sokolac	Istočno Sarajevo-Zvornik	693	12,021	5,919					
Vlasenica	Istočno Sarajevo-Zvornik	448	11,467	7,228					
Milići	Istočno Sarajevo-Zvornik	279	11,441	2,368					
Bileća	Trebinje-Foča	623	10,807	8,220					
Rogatica	Istočno Sarajevo-Zvornik	645	10,723	6,855					
Višegrad	Istočno Sarajevo-Zvornik	448	10,668	5,869					
Istočno Novo Sarajevo	Istočno Sarajevo-Zvornik	35	10,642	8,557					
Šipovo	Banja Luka	553	10,293	4,052					
Kneževo	Banja Luka	333	9,793	3,958					
Gacko	Trebinje-Foča	736	8,990	5,784					
Rudo	Istočno Sarajevo-Zvornik	348	7,963	1,949					
Stanari	Doboj-Bijeljina	165	6,958	1,015					
Šekovići	Istočno Sarajevo-Zvornik	237	6,761	1,519					
Petrovo	Doboj-Bijeljina	144	6,474	2,322					
Ribnik	Banja Luka	511	6,048	0					
Osmaci	Istočno Sarajevo-Zvornik	78	6,016	0					
Kostajnica	Banja Luka	85	5,977	4,047					
Pelagićevo	Doboj-Bijeljina	122	5,220	2,796					
Čajniče	Trebinje-Foča	275	4,895	2,401					
Vukosavlje	Doboj-Bijeljina	95	4,667	0					
Donji Žabar	Doboj-Bijeljina	47	3,809	0					
Han Pijesak	Istočno Sarajevo-Zvornik	323	3,530	2,018					
Ljubinje	Trebinje-Foča	319	3,511	2,744					
Novo Goražde	Istočno Sarajevo-Zvornik	119	3,117	0					
Oštra Luka	Banja Luka	205	2,786	0					
Berkovići	Trebinje-Foča	250	2,114	0					
Trnovo	Istočno Sarajevo-Zvornik	138	2,050	1,018					
Kalinovik	Trebinje-Foča	681	2,029	1,093					
Krupa na Uni	Banja Luka	84	1,597	0					
Jezero	Banja Luka	56	1,144	0					
Istočni Stari Grad	Istočno Sarajevo-Zvornik	70	1,131	39					
Petrovac	Banja Luka	155	361	0					
Kupres	Banja Luka	48	300	0					
Istočni Mostar	Trebinje-Foča	85	257	0					
Istočni Drvar	Banja Luka	75	79	0					

== Former municipalities ==
The Law on Territorial Organization and Local Self-Government was amended in 1996 to provide that certain municipalities whose territory was now completely or partially located in the Federation of Bosnia and Herzegovina would "temporarily stop functioning." In addition, the parts of these former municipalities that were located in Republika Srpska (if any) were incorporated into other municipalities.

The following are the former municipalities of Republika Srpska:

- Glamoč (part included in Šipovo)
- Gradačac (parts included in Modriča and Pelagićevo)
- Grahovo (formerly Bosansko Grahovo)
- Hadžići
- Ilijaš (part included in Sokolac)
- Konjic (parts included in Nevesinje)
- Kladanj (parts included in Šekovići)
- Lukavac (parts included in Petrovo)
- Maglaj (parts included in Doboj)
- Olovo (parts included in Sokolac)
- Skelani (included in Srebrenica)
- Srbobran (parts included in Šipovo) (formerly Donji Vakuf)
- Tuzla (parts included in Lopare)
- Vogošća

== Special municipalities ==
=== Sarajevo ===
In 1993, the Law on the Serb City of Sarajevo during the State of War or Immediate Danger of War was adopted providing that Serb Sarajevo (later Istočno Sarajevo) consisted of the following municipalities: Centar, Hadžići, Ilidža, Ilijaš, Novo Sarajevo, Stari Grad, Rajlovac, Vogošća, and Trnovo. Ilidža, Hadžići, Ilijaš, Rajlovac, and Vogošća were incorporated into the Federation of Bosnia and Herzegovina. The city now consists of the following six municipalities: Srpska Ilidža (name replaced by "Kasindo" in 2004), Srpsko Novo Sarajevo (name replaced by "Lukavica" in 2004), Pale, Sokolac, Srpski Stari Grad (name replaced by "Istočni Stari Grad" in 2004), and Trnovo.

In 1996, the name "Serb City of Sarajevo" was changed to "City of Srpsko Sarajevo". In 2004, the Constitutional Court of Bosnia and Herzegovina decided that the temporary name of the city would be decided that the former name of the city "be temporary replaced" with the name "City of Istočno (East) Sarajevo".

=== Brčko ===
A significant portion of the Brčko District (48% of its area) was created from territory of Republika Srpska (RS). RS controlled this territory until March 8, 2000 (see the History and Mandate of the OHR North/Brcko). The Brčko District was created as a shared territory, a condominium, of both entities (RS and the Federation of Bosnia and Herzegovina), but it was not placed under control of either, and is hence under direct jurisdiction of Bosnia and Herzegovina. RS's authorities never officially accepted the Brčko Arbitration result, but the official decision about jurisdiction remains.

== See also ==
- List of populated places in Bosnia and Herzegovina
- List of settlements in the Federation of Bosnia and Herzegovina
- List of cities in Bosnia and Herzegovina
- Municipalities of Bosnia and Herzegovina
