= Aleksije Jelačić =

Serbian historian

Aleksije (Aleksej) Jelačić (Russian: Алексей Елачич; Serbian Cyrillic: Алексије (Алексеј) Јелачић; January 10, 1892 – October 24, 1941) was a Serbian historian.

Jelačić was born in Kiev to a family of South Slavic descent. His ancestors came from Croatia.

He became a senior lecturer at the Saint Vladimir University in Kiev. He emigrated to the Kingdom of Serbs, Croats and Slovenes in 1920 and earned his doctor of philosophy from the University of Ljubljana in 1924. He then became a professor at the University in Skopje.

Jelačić authored research on historical and literary themes including protopope Avvakum, Dostoevsky, the history of Russia, Russian revolution, and history of Czechoslovakia, Poland, and other Slavic countries.

He died in Belgrade in 1941.

== Books ==
- Russian revolution and its origin. – Zagreb 1925.
- History of Russia. – Belgrade 1929.
- Czechoslovak history. – Belgrade 1930.
- On rotten. – Skopje 1933.
- History of Poland. – Skopje 1933.
- Russian social thought of the 19th century. – Belgrade 1934.
- Modern Czechoslovakia. – Skopje 1938.
- Russia and the Balkans. Belgrade 1940.
