= Akif Šeremet =

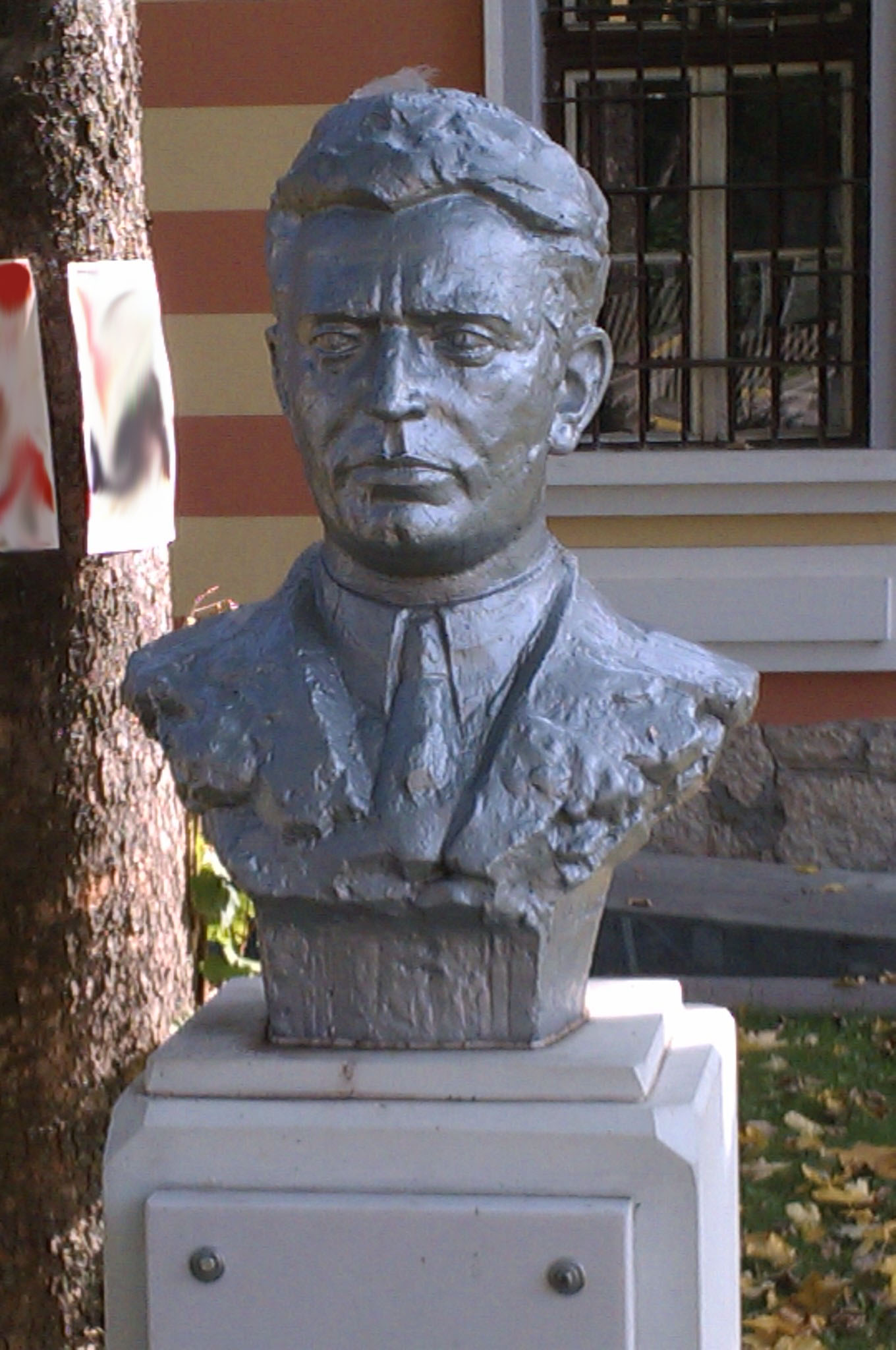
- A statue of Šeremet in Kladanj
- Born: 19 September 1895; Kladanj, Condominium of Bosnia and Herzegovina, Austria-Hungary
- Died: 19 April 1939 (aged 43); Moscow, RSFSR, USSR
- Spouse: Nafija

Akif Šeremet (19 September 1895 – 19 April 1939) was a Bosnian communist activist, known as the "Red Professor".

A member of the Communist Party of Yugoslavia since its inception in 1919, Šeremet remained active in various communist groups throughout the interwar period before being arrested in Moscow during the Great Purge and executed after nearly a year of imprisonment.

== Early life ==
Although the Šeremet family hailed from the village Suhača near Livno in southern Bosnia and Herzegovina, Akif Šeremet was born in the central Bosnian town Kladanj on 19 September 1895. His father Ahmed Šeremet, was a teacher in Livno.

== Education and teaching ==
After graduating teaching school, Šeremet received his doctorate in 1919 at the Faculty of Philosophy in Zagreb. From 1920 to 1921 he was a leading member of the League of Communist Youth of Yugoslavia at the University of Zagreb.

For a short time he taught at secondary schools in Prahovo and Čačak. In 1924 he was appointed a professor of history and geography at a high school in Banja Luka. He socialized with fellow activist and writer Veselin Masleša. Due to the addition of his personal communist stance into his teaching, he gained the nickname the "Red Professor".

== Arrest and death ==
Šeremet was arrested 19 July 1938 during the Great Purge in Moscow. In March 1939, Josip Broz Tito excluded Šeremet from the Communist party and declared him a "vermin" that was "cheating Comintern". Šeremet was executed along with other prominent Yugoslav communists, such as Kosta Novaković, Sima Marković and Sima Miljuš on 19 April 1939. They were cremated after the execution at the crematorium of the Donski cemetery in Moscow, where their remains were buried in a collective grave.
