= Kladanj =

Kladanj Кладањ
- Town and municipality
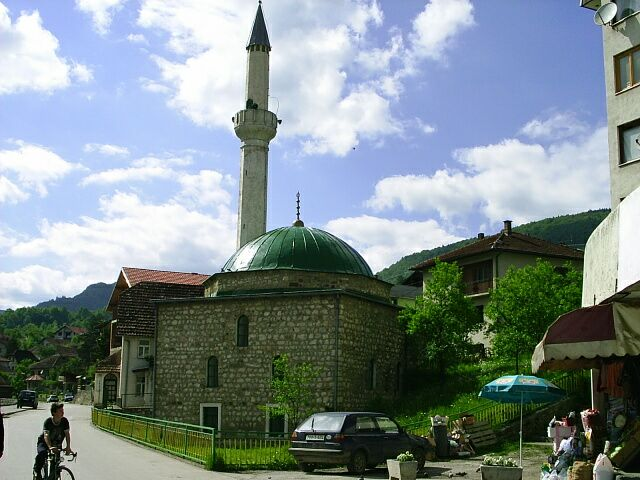

- Location of Kladanj within Bosnia and Herzegovina

- Location of Kladanj
- Coordinates: 44°13′32″N 18°41′33″E
- Country: Bosnia and Herzegovina
- Entity: Federation of Bosnia and Herzegovina
- Canton: Tuzla Canton

Government
  - Municipal mayor: Edis Šarić (SDA)

Area
  - Town and municipality: 325 km^{2} (125 sq mi)
- Elevation: 570 m (1,870 ft)

Population
  - Town and municipality: 12,348
  - Urban: 4,026
- Time zone: UTC+1 (CET)
  - Summer (DST): UTC+2 (CEST)
- Area code: +387 35

Kladanj (Serbian Cyrillic: Кладањ) is a town and municipality located in the Tuzla Canton of the Federation of Bosnia and Herzegovina, an entity of Bosnia and Herzegovina. Kladanj is located on the road from Tuzla to Sarajevo along the river Drinjača, at the base of Konjuh mountain.

== History ==
The first mention of the town of Kladanj dates back to 1138.

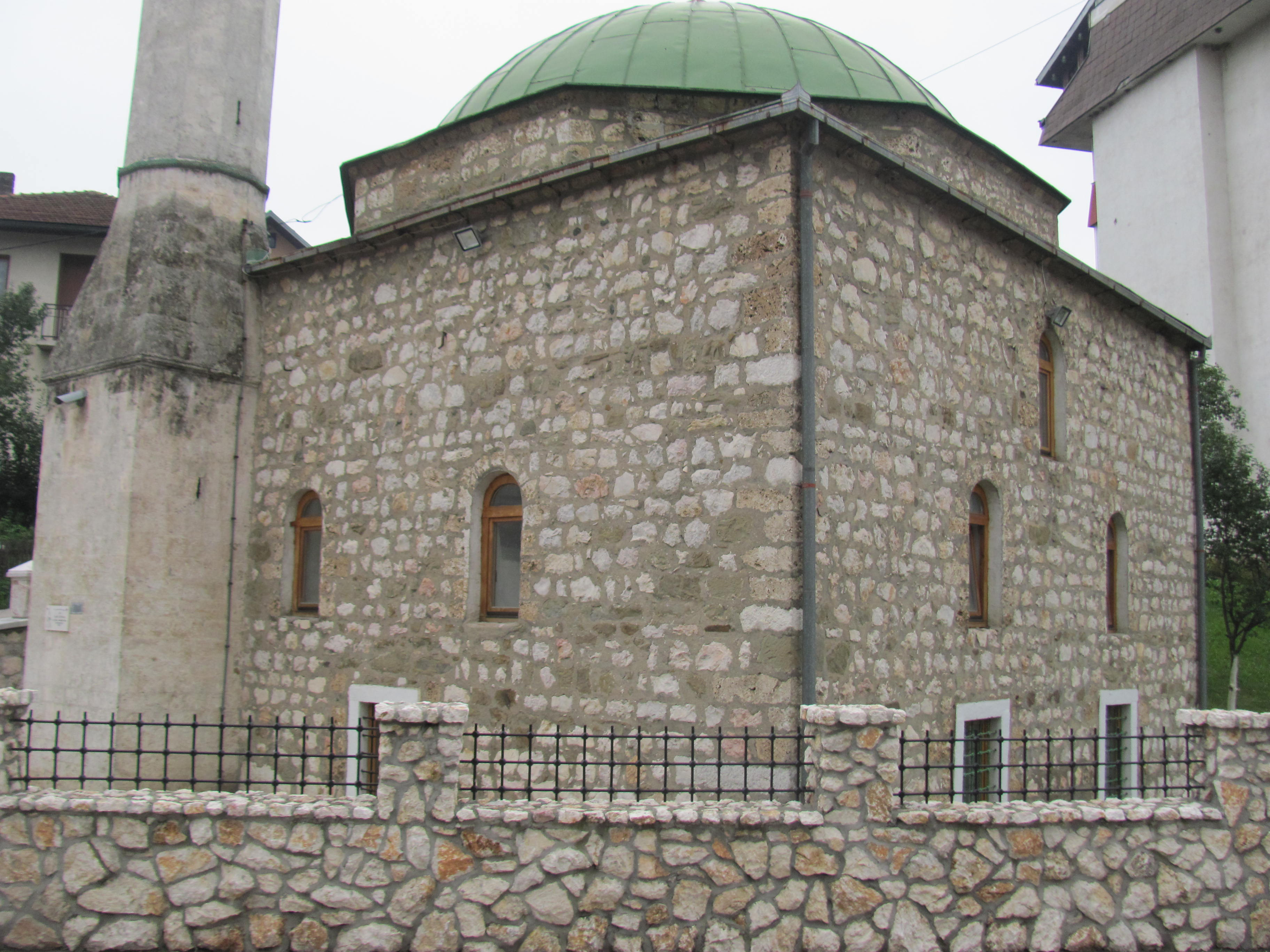
The Kuršumlija mosque in Kladanj - its name is derived from the Turkish word for lead (kurşun), due to the dome being covered with it

The first record of Kladanj in Turkish sources is from 1469, referring to the Četvrtkovište marketplace where on Thursdays big fairs were held. In the period of Ottoman rule, Kladanj was mentioned in 1557, as a settlement (kasaba) within the Sarajevo kadiluk (territorial unit) that would further on become a kadiluk itself with Olovo as a part of it.

== Settlements ==
• Brateljevići • Brdijelji • Brgule • Brlošci • Buševo • Crijevčići • Dole • Gojakovići • Gojsalići • Goletići • Jelačići • Jošje • Kladanj • Konjevići • Kovačići • Krivajevići • Lupoglavo • Majdan • Mala Kula • Matijevići • Mladovo • Noćajevići • Novo Naselje - Stupari • Obrćevac • Olovci • Pauč • Pelemiši • Pepići • Plahovići • Prijanovići • Prijevor • Ravne • Rujići • Starić • Stupari - Centar • Stupari - Selo • Suljići • Tarevo • Tuholj • Velika Kula • Vranovići • Vučinići • Zagrađe

== Demographics ==
=== 1971 ===
14,015 total

- Bosniaks - 9,300 (66.35%)
- Serbs - 4,487 (32.01%)
- Croats - 66 (0.47%)
- Yugoslavs - 63 (0.44%)
- others - 99 (0.73%)

=== 1991 ===
16,070 total

- Bosniaks - 11,621

=== Demographic 2013 Census ===
Municipality	Nationality						Total
Municipality	Bosniaks	%	Croats	%	Serbs	%	Total
Kladanj	11,997	97.15	33	0.26	107	0.86	12,348

According to the 2013 census, the population of the town was 4,026.

== Geography ==
The land area of the municipality is approximately 325 km^{2} (125 sq mi). The town is 570 meters above sea level.

== Economy ==
The lumber industry called "Sokolina" is one of the most vital economic contributors to the municipality.

== Notable people ==
- Sulejman Kupusović, film director
- Mirko Pejanović, member of the Presidency of the Republic of Bosnia and Herzegovina, as well as a professor and dean of the Faculty of Political Sciences in Sarajevo
- Akif Šeremet, founder and secretary of the LCY
- Avdaga Hasić, leader of the local militia "Avdaga's Legion"
- Senahid Halilović, professor of dialectology and author of "The Orthography of the Bosnian Language"
- Vahid Kljajić, professor emeritus and dean of the Faculty of Political Sciences in Sarajevo
