= Šekovići =

Šekovići Шековићи
- Town and municipality
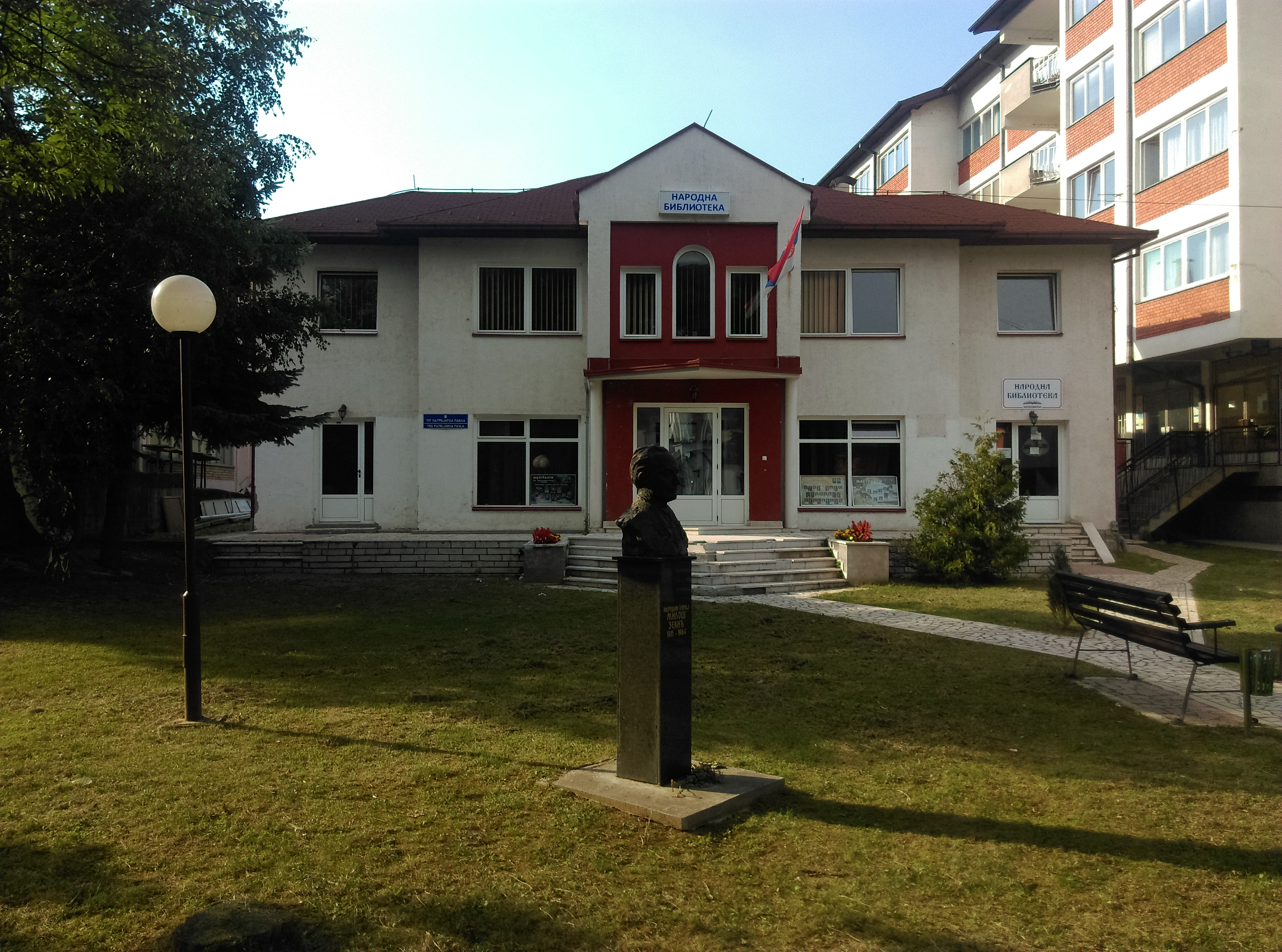
- City library with a bust of people's hero Miloš Zekić

- Coat of arms

- Location of Šekovići within Bosnia and Herzegovina

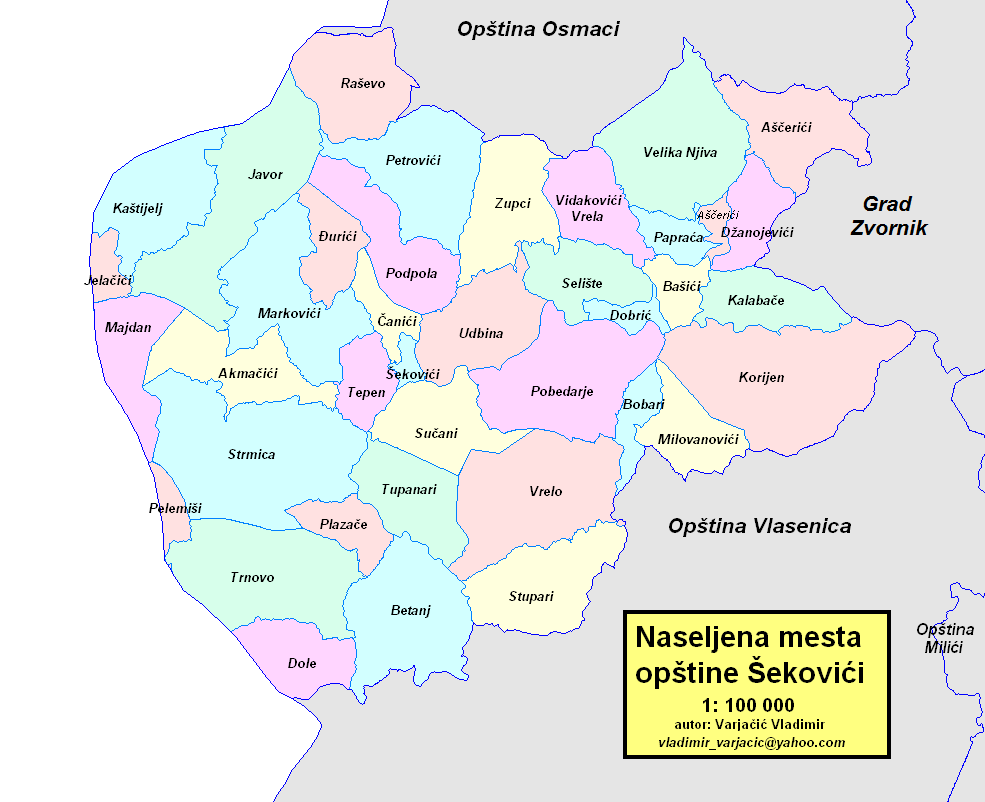
- Coordinates: 44°18′N 18°51′E
- Country: Bosnia and Herzegovina
- Entity: Republika Srpska

Government
  - Municipal mayor: Miladin Lazić (SNSD)

Area
  - Total: 237.2 km^{2} (91.6 sq mi)

Population (2013 census)
  - Total: 6,761
  - Density: 28.50/km^{2} (73.82/sq mi)
- Time zone: UTC+1 (CET)
  - Summer (DST): UTC+2 (CEST)
- Area code: 56
- Website: www.opstina-sekovici.com

Šekovići (Serbian Cyrillic: Шековићи) is a town and municipality in Republika Srpska, Bosnia and Herzegovina. As of 2013, it has a population of 6,761 inhabitants, while the town of Šekovići has a population of 1,519 inhabitants.

== History ==
From the Roman period to the present day major roads were cutting through the Šekovići region. These roads connected regions East of Drina River with Central Bosnia. Šekovići got its name by one portion of its inhabitants from Šekovina in Herzegovina, who immigrated to this region at the end of the 17th century. Until the end of the 17th century Šekovići was a well-inhabited area, till army invasions and different diseases decreased the population of Šekovići and almost wiped out the first people living there. Soon after that the new inhabitants from Herzegovina settled in Šekovići and they make up most of today’s populations. One of the first settlers beginning XVII left Šekovići, Ilija Birčanin, Hadži Milentije and Prote Matije Nenadović. Because of the family and other ties through the monastery this region had strong military cooperation with Serbia during the First Serbian Uprising. Ivan Groznog's mother Jelica Jakšić Glinska is from Šekovići and because of the Monastery Papraća and Russian Czar Palace had a good relationship. Monastery Lovnica and Papraca in the past were significant cultural and freedom centers. From the 16th century these two monasteries had ties with Russia, and monasteries in Serbia, Poland and Vlachs. Šekovići have special places in NOB (Serbian: Narodno Oslobodilacka Borba, English:Peoples Freedom Fight), they belong to one of the first uprising regions in Yugoslavia. In Šekovići were formed the Prva Bircanska Brigada (First Birac Brigate), Sesta Istocnobosanska Brigada (Sixst Eastern Bosnian Brigate) and Prva Pionirska Divizija (First Pionir Division). In 1943, Sekovici was the military, political and cultural center for eastern Bosnia, according to author Rudi Petovara. Inside of it was the highest military and political leadership for Eastern Bosnia.

== Demographics ==
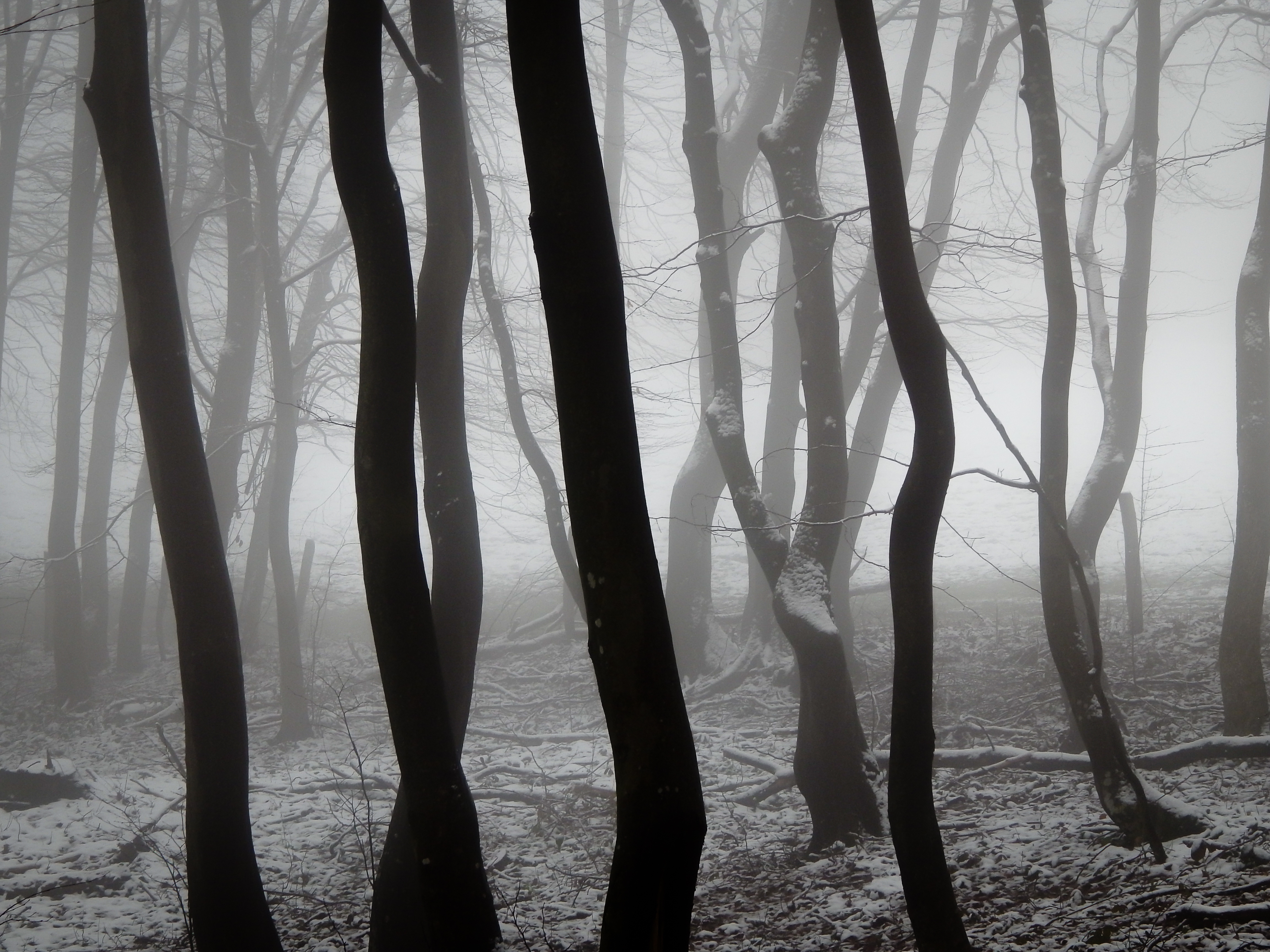
Thick forest in the municipality

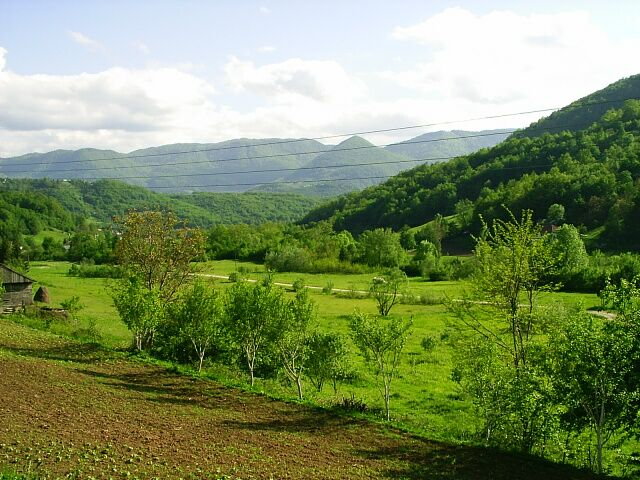
Landscape from Šekovići

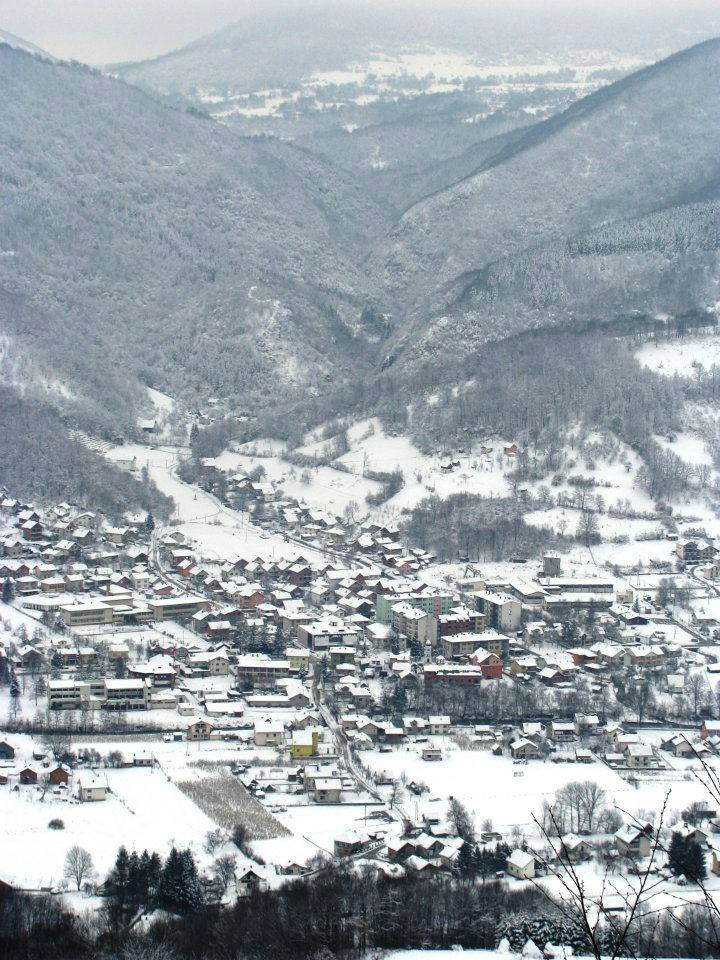
Šekovići during winter

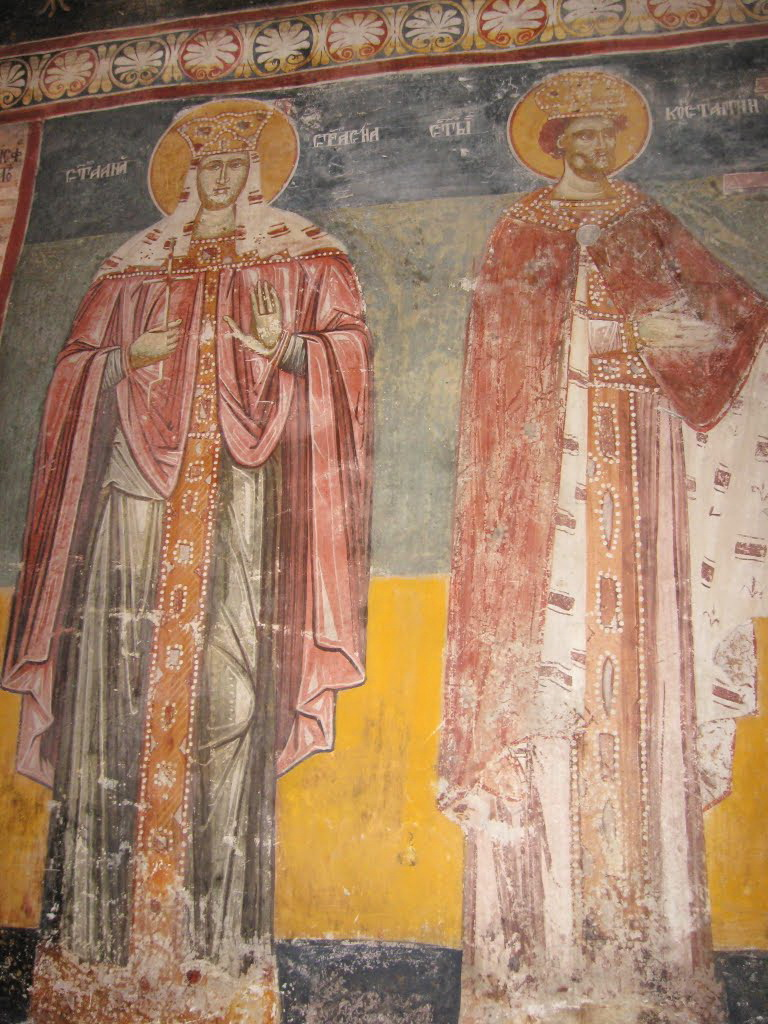
Fresco from Lomnica Monastery founded by Serbian king Stefan Dragutin

=== Population ===
Population of settlement – Šekovići municipality
	Settlement	1971.	1981.	1991.	2013.
	Total	10,570	10,356	9,639	6,761
1	Ašćerići			226	228
2	Džanojevići			351	225
3	Šekovići	541	1,230	1,735	1,519
4	Stupari			368	299
5	Sučani			562	626
6	Tepen			193	353
7	Udbina			781	694
8	Velika Njiva			512	293

=== Ethnic composition ===
Ethnic composition – Šekovići town
	2013.	1991.	1981.	1971.
Total	1,519 (100,0%)	1,735 (100,0%)	1,230 (100,0%)	541 (100,0%)
Serbs		1,606 (92,56%)	1,059 (86,10%)	520 (96,12%)
Yugoslavs		80 (4,611%)	90 (7,317%)	
Others		27 (1,556%)	1 (0,081%)	
Bosniaks		17 (0,980%)	32 (2,602%)	10 (1,848%)
Croats		5 (0,288%)	12 (0,976%)	5 (0,924%)
Montenegrins			22 (1,789%)	3 (0,555%)
Albanians			12 (0,976%)	2 (0,370%)
Macedonians			1 (0,081%)	
Hungarians			1 (0,081%)	1 (0,185%)

Ethnic composition – Šekovići municipality
	2013.	1991.	1981.	1971.
Total	6 761 (100,0%)	9 629 (100,0%)	10 356 (100,0%)	10 570 (100,0%)
Serbs	6 618 (97,88%)	9 030 (93,78%)	9 753 (94,18%)	10 241 (96,89%)
Bosniaks	107 (1,583%)	326 (3,386%)	304 (2,935%)	286 (2,706%)
Others	28 (0,414%)	134 (1,392%)	31 (0,299%)	25 (0,237%)
Croats	8 (0,118%)	10 (0,104%)	15 (0,145%)	6 (0,057%)
Yugoslavs		129 (1,340%)	208 (2,008%)	2 (0,019%)
Montenegrins			30 (0,290%)	5 (0,047%)
Albanians			13 (0,126%)	3 (0,028%)
Macedonians			1 (0,010%)	1 (0,009%)
Hungarians			1 (0,010%)	1 (0,009%)

== Economy ==
The following table gives a preview of total number of registered people employed in legal entities per their core activity (as of 2018):

Activity	Total
Agriculture, forestry and fishing	50
Mining and quarrying	-
Manufacturing	302
Electricity, gas, steam and air conditioning supply	20
Water supply; sewerage, waste management and remediation activities	12
Construction	3
Wholesale and retail trade, repair of motor vehicles and motorcycles	79
Transportation and storage	24
Accommodation and food services	36
Information and communication	2
Financial and insurance activities	5
Real estate activities	-
Professional, scientific and technical activities	7
Administrative and support service activities	2
Public administration and defense; compulsory social security	97
Education	120
Human health and social work activities	38
Arts, entertainment and recreation	9
Other service activities	6
Total	812

== See also ==
- Municipalities of Republika Srpska
