= List of cities in Bosnia and Herzegovina =

Official cities of Bosnia and Herzegovina.

This is a list of cities and towns with over 10,000 inhabitants (or lower if the municipality has over 20,000 inhabitants) in Bosnia and Herzegovina. For the full list of populated places, see List of populated places in Bosnia and Herzegovina.

== Organization ==
Apart from entities, cantons and municipalities, Bosnia and Herzegovina also has officially designated cities. Official cities have their own mayor and city council, which is a big difference to the municipalities of Bosnia and Herzegovina, which have a municipal council and mayor. Powers of city councils of official cities are between the government of municipalities and government cantons in the Federation of Bosnia and Herzegovina or a government entity in Republika Srpska. There are thirty seven official cities in Bosnia and Herzegovina (as of 2024):

- Banja Luka
- Bijeljina
- Bihać
- Bosanska Krupa
- Brčko
- Cazin
- Čapljina
- Derventa
- Doboj
- Foča
- Goražde
- Gračanica
- Gradačac
- Gradiška
- Istočno Sarajevo
- Konjic
- Laktaši
- Livno
- Lukavac
- Ljubuški
- Mostar
- Novi Travnik
- Orašje
- Prijedor
- Prnjavor
- Sarajevo
- Srebrenik
- Stolac
- Široki Brijeg
- Teslić
- Trebinje
- Tuzla
- Visoko
- Zavidovići
- Zenica
- Zvornik
- Živinice

== List ==
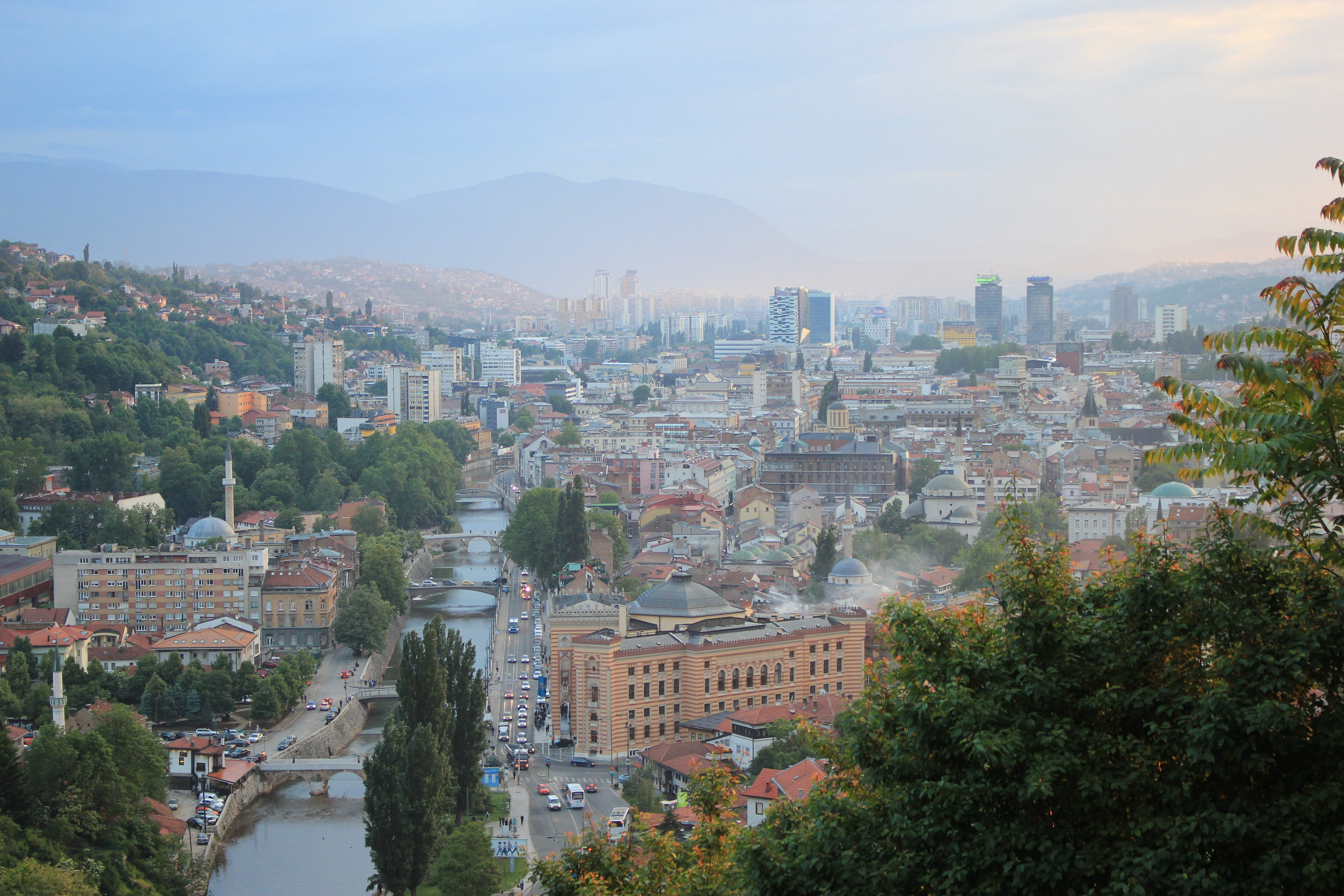
Sarajevo, the capital and largest city in Bosnia and Herzegovina

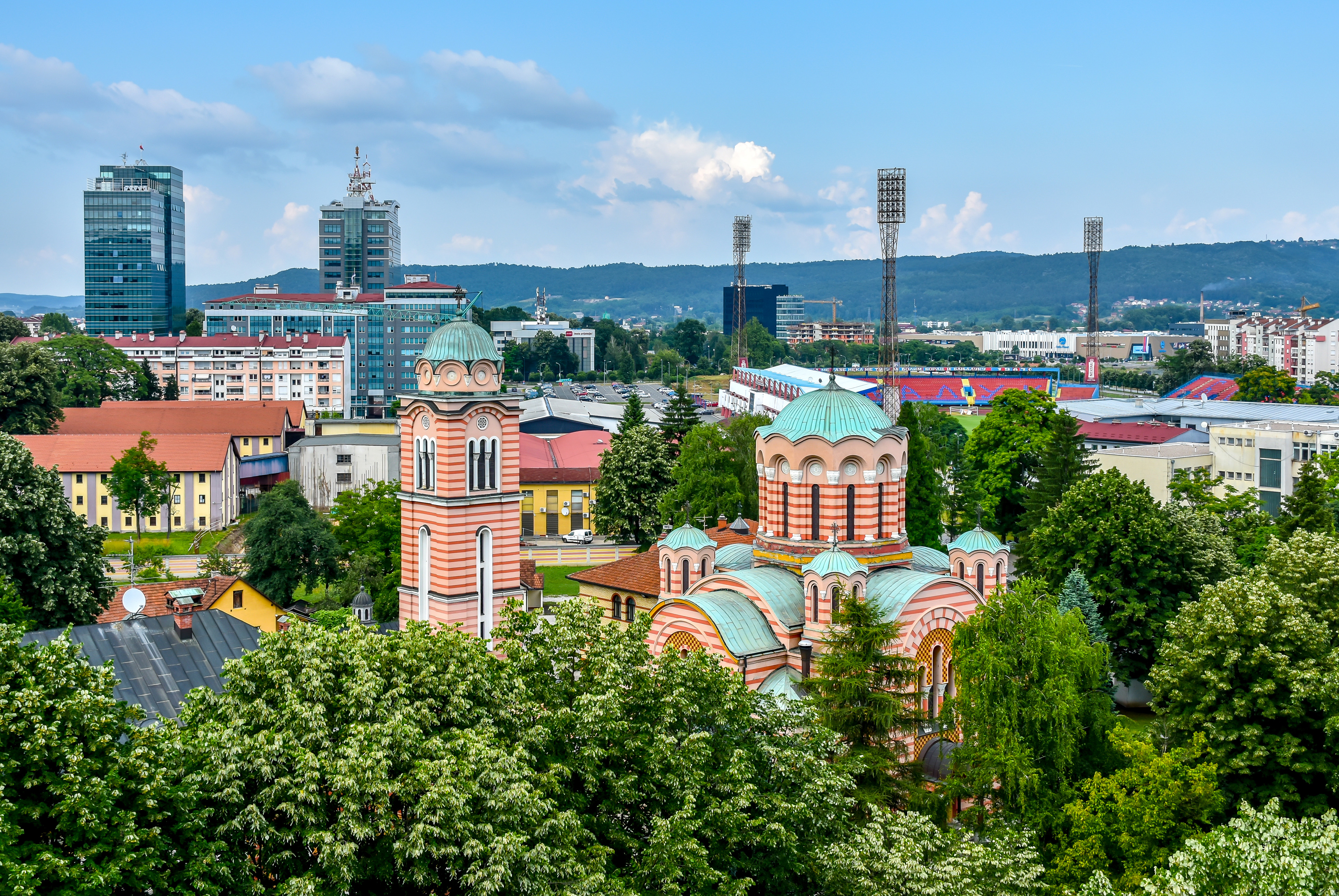
Banja Luka

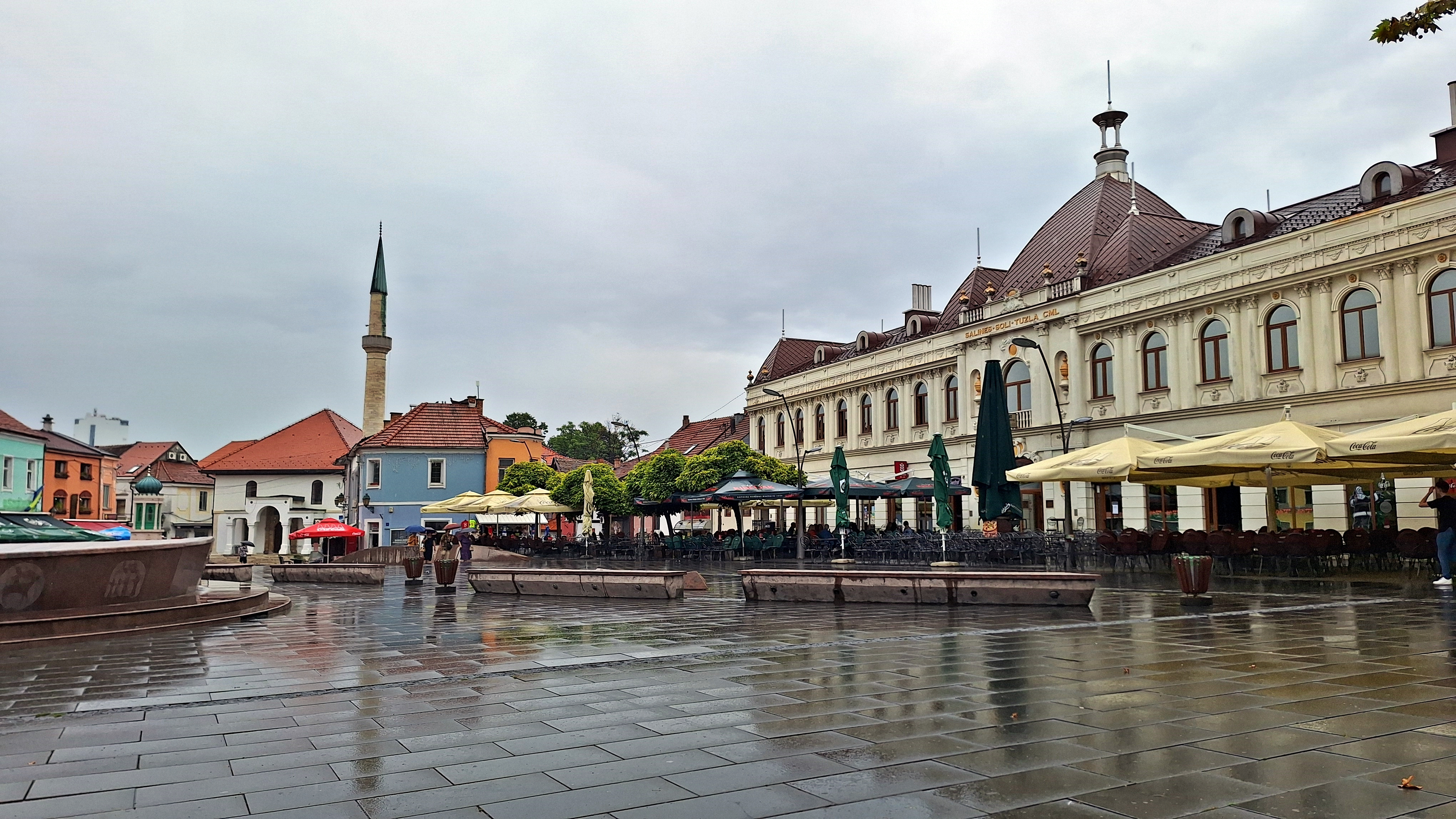
Tuzla

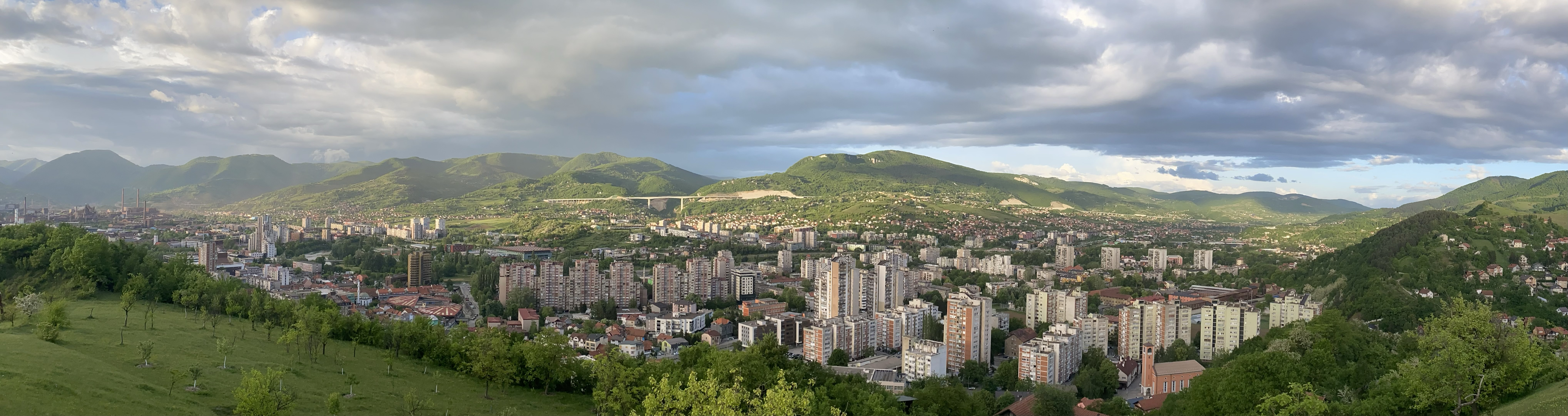
Zenica

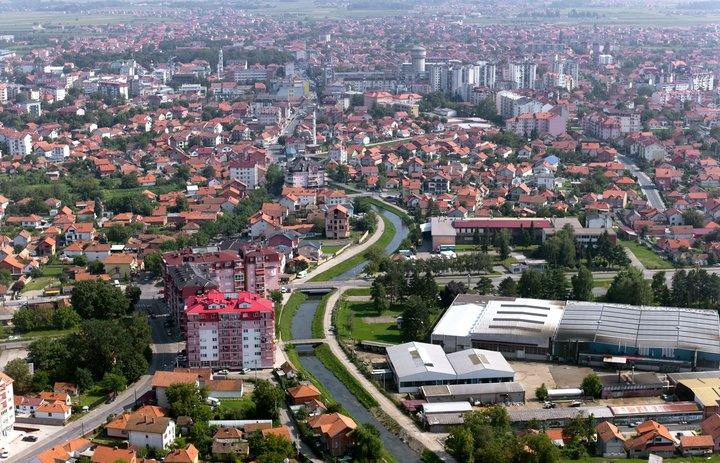
Bijeljina

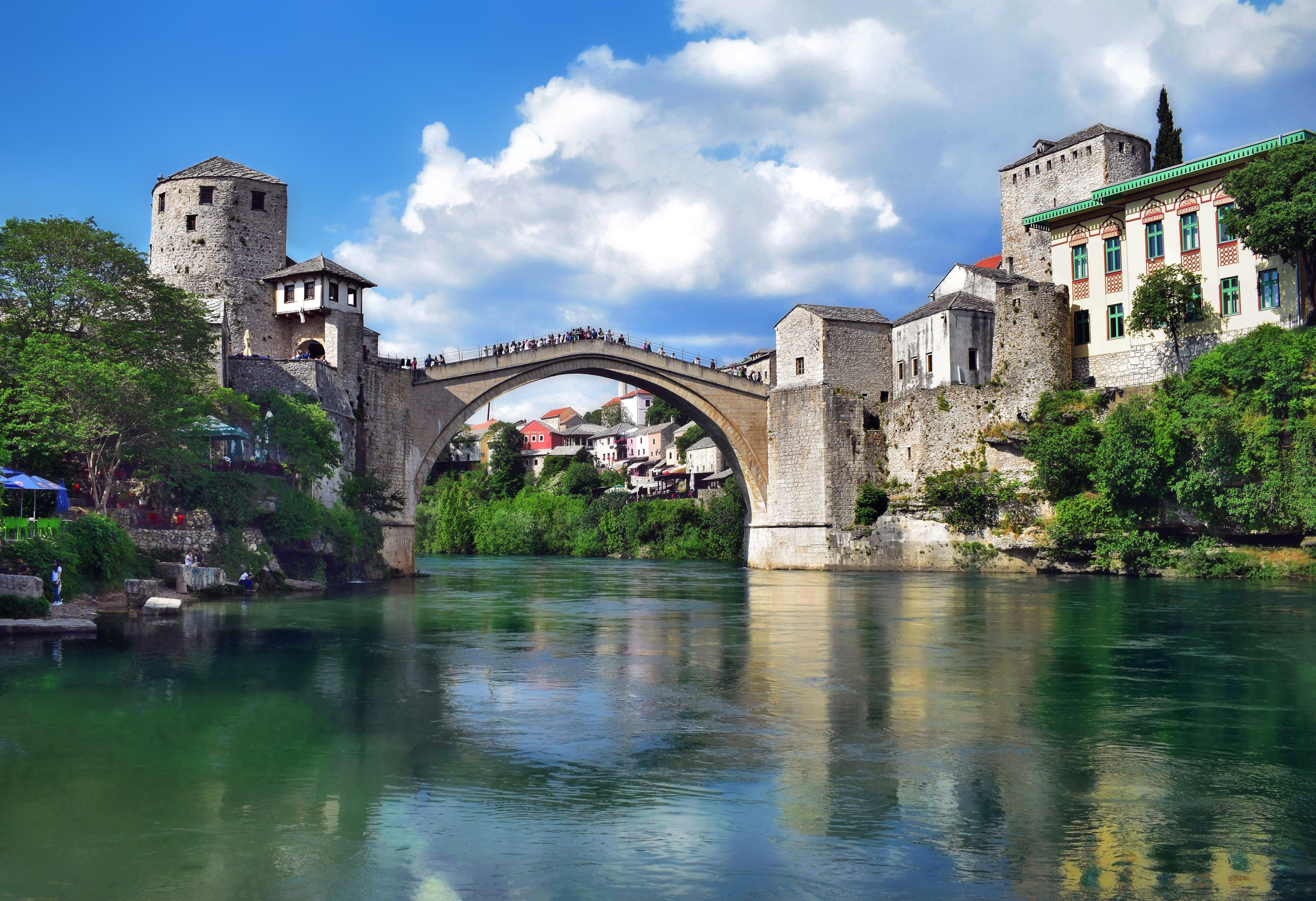
Mostar

The list includes only the 55 cities and towns whose administrative area has a population greater than 20,000. Istočno Sarajevo, with a population of 61,516 in its administrative area, is not included, since it is a city only in administrative sense and does not have a city proper.

"¤" indicates an official city.

City / town	Entity/Canton	Administrative / municipal			Settlement	
City / town	Entity/Canton	Rank	2013 pop.	1991 pop.	Rank	2013 pop.
Sarajevo ¤	Sarajevo Canton	1	275,524 (Note: Population of municipalities of Centar, Novi Grad, Novo Sarajevo and Stari Grad which form the City of Sarajevo)	361,735 (Note: In 1991, the City of Sarajevo consisted of municipalities of Centar, Novi Grad, Novo Sarajevo, Stari Grad, Ilidža, Vogošća, Hadžići, Ilijaš, Pale and Trnovo. This number of inhabitants includes only the current municipalities.)	1	348,669
Banja Luka ¤	Republika Srpska	2	185,042	195,692	2	138,963
Tuzla ¤	Tuzla Canton	3	110,979	131,618	3	74,457
Zenica ¤	Zenica-Doboj Canton	4	110,663	145,517	4	70,553
Bijeljina ¤	Republika Srpska	5	107,715	96,988	7	45,278
Mostar ¤	Herzegovina-Neretva Canton	6	105,797	126,628	6	60,195
Prijedor ¤	Republika Srpska	7	89,397	112,543	10	29,555
Brčko ¤	Brčko District	8	83,516	87,627	8	39,893
Doboj ¤	Republika Srpska	9	71,441	102,549	11	25,132
Ilidža	Sarajevo Canton	10	66,730	67,937	5	63,528
Cazin ¤	Una-Sana Canton	11	66,149	63,409	18	13,863
Zvornik ¤	Republika Srpska	12	58,856	81,295	26	11,497
Živinice ¤	Tuzla Canton	13	57,765	54,783	14	16,157
Bihać ¤	Una-Sana Canton	14	56,261	70,732	9	39,690
Travnik	Central Bosnia Canton	15	53,482	70,747	16	15,344
Gradiška ¤	Republika Srpska	16	51,727	59,974	17	14,368
Gračanica ¤	Tuzla Canton	17	45,220	59,134	20	12,882
Lukavac ¤	Tuzla Canton	18	44,520	57,070	22	12,061
Tešanj	Zenica-Doboj Canton	19	43,063	48,480	50	5,257
Sanski Most	Una-Sana Canton	20	41,475	60,307	13	16,913
Velika Kladuša	Una-Sana Canton	21	40,419	52,908	53	4,520
Visoko ¤	Zenica-Doboj Canton	22	39,938	46,160	27	11,205
Srebrenik ¤	Tuzla Canton	23	39,678	40,896	40	6,694
Gradačac ¤	Tuzla Canton	24	39,340	56,581	21	12,764
Teslić ¤	Republika Srpska	25	38,536	59,584	39	7,057
Kakanj	Zenica-Doboj Canton	26	37,441	55,950	24	11,796
Zavidovići ¤	Zenica-Doboj Canton	27	35,988	57,164	34	8,174
Prnjavor ¤	Republika Srpska	28	35,956	47,055	35	8,120
Laktaši ¤	Republika Srpska	29	34,966	29,832	49	5,419
Livno ¤	Canton 10	30	34,133	40,600	36	7,927
Kalesija	Tuzla Canton	31	33,053	41,809	56	2,039
Tomislavgrad	Canton 10	32	31,592	30,009	47	5,587
Bugojno	Central Bosnia Canton	33	31,470	46,889	15	15,555
Žepče	Zenica-Doboj Canton	34	30,219	22,966	48	5,460
Trebinje ¤	Republika Srpska	35	29,918	30,966	12	23,770
Široki Brijeg ¤	West Herzegovina Canton	36	28,929	27,160	44	6,149
Ljubuški ¤	West Herzegovina Canton	37	28,184	28,340	54	4,023
Derventa ¤	Republika Srpska	38	27,404	56,489	25	11,631
Jajce	Central Bosnia Canton	39	27,258	45,007	38	7,172
Novi Grad	Republika Srpska	40	27,115	41,665	31	10,120
Čapljina ¤	Herzegovina-Neretva Canton	41	26,157	27,882	46	5,774
Vitez	Central Bosnia Canton	42	25,836	27,859	42	6,329
Modriča	Republika Srpska	43	25,720	35,613	32	9,419
Bosanska Krupa ¤	Una-Sana Canton	44	25,545	58,320	30	10,196
Konjic ¤	Herzegovina-Neretva Canton	45	25,148	43,878	28	10,732
Hadžići	Sarajevo Canton	46	23,891	24,200	51	4,993
Novi Travnik ¤	Central Bosnia Canton	47	23,832	30,713	33	9,008
Maglaj	Zenica-Doboj Canton	48	23,146	43,388	45	6,099
Banovići	Tuzla Canton	49	22,773	26,590	41	6,432
Kozarska Dubica	Republika Srpska	50	21,524	31,606	29	10,544
Gornji Vakuf-Uskoplje	Central Bosnia Canton	51	20,933	25,181	52	4,831
Pale	Republika Srpska	52	20,909	16,355	19	12,905
Goražde ¤	Bosnian-Podrinje Canton Goražde	53	20,897	37,573	23	11,806
Kiseljak	Central Bosnia Canton	54	20,722	24,164	55	3,554
Posušje	West Herzegovina Canton	55	20,477	17,134	43	6,267

== See also ==
- List of populated places in Bosnia and Herzegovina
- List of settlements in the Federation of Bosnia and Herzegovina
- Municipalities of Bosnia and Herzegovina
- Municipalities of Republika Srpska
