= List of fortifications in Bosnia and Herzegovina =

This is a list of fortifications in Bosnia and Herzegovina, including fortresses and castles, arranged alphabetically.

Bosnian archaeologist and historian of the Middle Ages, Pavao Anđelić, posited that Bosnia and Herzegovina is a home of great number of forts, fortresses, castles, including a number of walled city-fortresses, in various degrees of preservation, and built in different stages of Bosnian history. According to his research he argued that at least 350 of these edifices exists on the territory of modern-day Bosnia and Herzegovina, most of which was erected by or belonged to a medieval Bosnian state, while small number in its borderlands simply rests on the territories included into modern state of Bosnia and Herzegovina, which was largely unchanged, with few very minor exceptions, since 1878. In his book, the Medieval Towns in Bosnia and Herzegovina, historian of architecture of the Middle Ages in Bosnia and Herzegovina, Husref Redžić, described 225 sites in manuscript and 147 in published book.

== List ==
The list is based on body of work in Bosnia and Herzegovinian historiography.

Castle	Location	Type	Constructed/ earliest mention	Notes	Image
Bijela Tabija	Vratnik (Sarajevo)		c. 1550	Bijela Tabija (English: White Bastion) is an old fort overlooking the historic core of Sarajevo. It is a national monument of Bosnia and Herzegovina.	
Blagaj	Mostar				
Bobovac	Vareš/Kraljeva Sutjeska				
Bočac Fortress	Bočac				
Borač Castle	Brčigovo	Fortified town with noble court	1244 (13th century)	Borač was noble court of Radinović-Pavlović and one of the largest and most important fortified towns of medieval Bosnia	
Bosanska Krupa Fortress	Bosanska Krupa				
Bužim Castle	Bužim				
Branković Tower	Trebinje				
Captain's Citadel	Bihać				
Citadel Počitelj	Počitelj		1383		
Medieval Town of Dubrovnik (Bosnia and Herzegovina)	Ilijaš				
Daorson	Ošanjići, Stolac				
Dobor	Modriča		1387		
Drijeva	Ćapljina		13th c.		
Fazlagić Tower	Gacko		1735		
Fortress of Doboj	Doboj		13th century		
Glamoč Fortress	Glamoč		14th century		
Gradačac Castle	Gradačac		1765		
Gradina	Pale		15th century		
Greben Fort	Krupa na Vrbasu				
Hodidjed	Sarajevo				
Hutovo Fortress	Hutovo Blato				
Jajce Castle	Jajce		14th century		
Kamengrad Fort	Sanski Most				
Kamičak Fort	Ključ				
Kastel Fortress	Banja Luka				
Ključ Castle	Gacko				
Ključ Castle	Ključ				
Komotin Castle	Jajce		14th century		
Kotor Castle	Kotor Varoš			Hrvoje Vukčić's seat, before moving it to Jajce Castle	
Kozograd	Fojnica			The royal summer-residence, King Tomaš office, Queen Katarina last refuge from Ottoman invasion	
Kušlat	Zvornik		1346	Bosnian royal demesne	
Ljubuški Fortress	Ljubuški				
Maglaj Fortress	Maglaj				
Miljacka, Old Town	Pale		15th century		
Momčilo's Citadel	Drvar				
Old town of Visoki	Visoko				
Orašac Fort	Kulen Vakuf				
Ostrožac Castle	Cazin		16th century		
Ostrovica Castle	Kulen Vakuf				
Pavlovac Castle	Prača (Pale-Prača)	Fortified town with noble court	1392 (14th century)	Pavlovac was noble court of Radinović-Pavlović and one of the largest and most important fortified towns of medieval Bosnia	
Prusac Fortress	Prusac				
Prince Marko's Tower	Višegrad				
Smajilagić's Citadel, Upper Town	Livno				
Samobor Castle	Hladila				
Sokograd	Gerzovo, Mrkonjić Grad		1357		
Soko Fort	Soko, Gračanica				
Sokolac	Bihać				
Srebrenica	Srebrenica		1333		
Srebrenik Fortress	Srebrenik		1333		
Stolac / Vidoški	Stolac				
Tešanj Castle	Tešanj				
Travnik Castle	Travnik				
Tuhaglia	Tarčin				
Velika Kladuša Castle	Velika Kladuša				
Vinac fortress	Vinac				
Visuć Citadel (Black Queen's Citadel)	Drvar				
Vranduk Fortress	Vranduk				
Vrnograč Castle	Vrnograč, Velika Kladusa				
Vujadin's Citadel	Livno				
Zvečaj Fortress	Rekavice				
Zvornik fortress	Zvornik		c. 12th century		
Žuta Tabija	Vratnik (Sarajevo)		c. 1727-1739	Žuta Tabija (English: Yellow Bastion), built between 1727 and 1739, is an old fort overlooking the historic core of Sarajevo. It is a national monument of Bosnia and Herzegovina.	
Walled City of Jajce	Jajce				
Walled City of Počitelj	Počitelj				
Walled City of Vratnik	Sarajevo		c. 1727-1739	"Walled city of Vratnik" lies within wider eponymous Sarajevo neighborhood, fortified after brief 1697 terror-raid of Prince Eugene of Savoy. In 2005 it's designated national monument of BiH.	

== See also ==
- List of castles
- List of World Heritage Sites in Bosnia and Herzegovina
- List of National Monuments of Bosnia and Herzegovina
