= Jadar (Drinjača) =

River in northeastern Bosnia and Herzegovina

Coordinates: 44°16′45″N 19°06′25″E

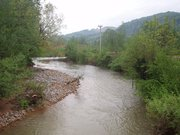

- Location within Bosnia and Herzegovina

Physical characteristics
- Mouth: Drinjača

Basin features
- Progression: Drinjača→Drina→Sava→Danube
- River system: Danube
- Landmarks: Kušlat
- Population: 893,7

Jadar is a river in the northeastern part of Bosnia and Herzegovina.

It originates from the Zeleni and Studeni Jadar, which meet in Milići. The Studeni Jadar springs out in the village of Zalukovik near Vlasenica, and the Zeleni below Kuka hill (1100 m). It also flows through a canyon with steep almost vertical slopes.

It flows into the Drinjača near Kušlat fortress. The Jadar basin divides the areas of historic župas, Birać and Ludmer.

The Drinjača including its major tributaries like Jadar is a natural spawning ground for huchen, and now there are grayling and brown trout. All these fish species are endangered by overfishing by the local population living on the riverbanks, but most of all by pollution. The river is polluted by the bauxite mine from Milići, which discharges its wastewater into the river. During the year, this water is completely red with ore. Upstream of Milići, both Jadar's are unpolluted and clear rivers, without settlements and human activities.

== Jadar region ==
At the mouth of the Drinjač, on the other side of the Jadar, rises an unusually steep rock, on top of which a mosque is built. Bosnian-Herzegovinian Nobel laureate, writer Ivo Andrić, wrote down, passing by Kušlat, an often quoted thought:

What kind of Bosnian are you if you don't know about Kušlat? It's on that part of the old road that leads from Zvornik to central Bosnia, and it's also famous for the fact that the first mosque in Bosnia was built there.

== See also ==
- List of rivers of Bosnia and Herzegovina
