= Kušlat =

Castle and mosque in Bosnia and Herzegovina

Coordinates: 44.2766°N 19.1103°E

Kušlat Mosque
- Zvornik, Bosnia and Herzegovina

Location

Kušlat, also Kučlat, is medieval mosque in Bosnia and Herzegovina. The fortress is located south of Zvornik, not far from Pahljevići, above the confluence of the Jadar and Drinjača, in Zvornik municipality. The fortress had its own podgrađe (transl. castle town), with a trg or trgovište (transl. market square – transl. market town), and was called Podkučlat. Podkučlat also had a medieval custom for collecting taxes from merchants who traded goods in the region.

== Etymology ==
In the charter of Bosnian King Stjepan Ostoja from 1417, a witness was mentioned with a name Nikola Kušlatović (Latin: Cuclatovich). In historiography it is presumed that the town was called Kušlat or Kučlat after this family.

== Location ==
The fortress is located south of Zvornik, on a vertical rock about a hundred meters high above the confluence of the Jadar and Drinjača, not far from Paljević village, Zvornik municipality. The fortress belonged to the Bosnian royal domain in the medieval župa of Trebotić.

== Development and description ==
The Kučlat castle also had its own podgrađe podgrađe (transl. castle town), with a trg or trgovište (transl. market square – transl. market town), and was called Podkučlat. This was also a settlement for the Ragusan merchant colony, and where the customs office was located.

The castle town of Podkučlat developed primarily thanks to the mining activity in the wider region of Jadar, and medieval župas of Birač and Ludmer. In the economic sense, it was still a period of growth that ended with a passing of the 14th century. It is also an important crossroads, and a transit station for Ragusan traders heading north towards Zvornik, east to Olovo and Central Bosnia, south towards Srebrenica, and across the Drina to Serbia.

== History ==
=== Medieval ===
Kušlat was mentioned for the first time in 1346, and after in the charter of Bosnian King Stjepan Ostoja from 1417.

In the course of the 15th century, Kučlat passed from hand to hand, so beside the Bosnian rulers, it also passed into the hands of Hungarians, Serbs and Ottomans. Since 1404, Kučlat was in the possession of Bosnian Grand Duke, Hrvoje Vukčić, and since 1410, it was handed over to the Hungarian king Sigismund of Luxembourg by agreement.

=== Fall ===
It fell to the Ottomans in 1459, and from then until 1833, it housed an Ottoman crew.

=== Ottoman ===
In the Ottoman era in Bosnia, Kučlat was a nahiyah that belonged to the Zvornik Sandžak. The fortress had a military function throughout the Ottoman rule. The anonymous description says that the town is small, with few weak cannons, and a crew of up to 15 guards. In 1804, there were 12 mustahfiz timarli and 15 jebedji in Kušlat. Due to reforms, fortress was abandoned before 1833.

== Kušlat mosque ==
The Kušlat mosque was built inside the old fort. It was intended for the needs of the crew of the Ottoman army. The famous travel writer Evlija Celebija says that it is Ebul Fethova, which means that it was built in the 15th century, during the reign of Sultan Mehmed II el-Fatih, when the Ottomans conquered Bosnia. The Kušlat Mosque is considered the oldest military mosque in Bosnia and Herzegovina.

== Present condition ==
It is considered one of the most inaccessible fortresses in Bosnia and Herzegovina. Today, the remains of the walls of the former fortress are visible, but it is impossible to determine the exact foundation of the fortress. Together with the surrounding cliffs, the base looks like a broken ellipse, which made Ottoman travel writer, Evliya Çelebi to write that Kučlat "is a round stone city with hard bastions, built on a steep rock; there is no moat, but it is surrounded by an infernal abyss", according to Husref Redžić.

== See also ==
- List of fortresses in Bosnia and Herzegovina
- Ottoman architecture in Bosnia and Herzegovina

== Bibliography ==
- Vego, Мarko (1957). Naselja bosanske srednjevjekovne države. Sarajevo: Svijetlost. p. 66.
- Redžić, Husref (2009). Средњовјековни градови у Босни и Херцеговини [Medieval cities in Bosnia and Herzegovina] (in Serbian). Sarajevo: Сарајево-паблишинг. ISBN 978-9958-21-511-7.
- Kreševljaković, Hamdija (1957). "Stari bosanski gradovi" (PDF). Naše starine. I (13). Sarajevo: fmks.gov.ba.
- Anđelić, Pavao (1977). "Ubikacija oblasti Trebotića i teritoriajlno-politička organizacija Bosanskog Podrinja u srednjem vijeku". Glasnik Zemaljskog muzeja BiH (30–31). Sarajevo: Zemaljski muzej BiH: 243–268.
- Dinić, Mihailo (1955). За историју рударства у средњовековној Србији и Босни - I дио. Београд. p. 35. ISBN 978-9958-21-511-7.
- Filipović, Milenko (1962). Kušlat. Zagreb: Enciklopedija Jugoslavije, V. p. 460.
- Kovačević-Kojić, Desanka (1978). Градска насеља средњовјековне босанске државе. Сарајево: Enciklopedija Jugoslavije, V. pp. 32, 36, 52.
- Miljković, Ema (2003). Зеамет Кушлат, 'Земља Павловића. Средњи вијек и период Турске владавине'. Бања Лука-Српско Сарајево: Enciklopedija Jugoslavije, V. pp. 367–378.
- Mrgić, Jelena (2008). Северна Босна. Београд. p. 76.
- Çelebi, Evliya (1967). Путопис : одломци о југословенским земљама [Travelogue: excerpts about Yugoslav countries] (in Serbian). Sarajevo: Свјетлост.
