= Rašića Gaj massacres =

Killings of Serbs by Ustashe

- Location: 44.2232°N 18.9413°E; Rašića Gaj, Vlasenica in Bosnia and Herzegovina (contemporary Independent State of Croatia)
- Date: June 22, 1941 – July 20, 1941
- Target: Genocidal persecution of Serbs
- Attack type: Mass killing
- Deaths: 70-200
- Victim: Serbs
- Perpetrator: Ustaše
- Motive: Anti-Serbian Orthodoxy, anti-Serbian sentiment, Croatisation, Greater Croatia

The Rašića Gaj massacres were massacres of Serbs committed by the Ustaše forces at the beginning of the World War II in Rašića Gaj, Vlasenica in Bosnia and Herzegovina (contemporary Independent State of Croatia) in June and July 1941. The estimations of the number of Serbs killed in Rašića Gaj vary between at least 70 and 200. It was one of the most shocking early World War II war crimes for Serbs in Eastern Bosnia and the testimonies about the cruel slaughter of Serbs in Rašića Gaj spread among the population of the region, causing fear and anger among the Serbs.

== Background ==
According to some sources (Krsmanović, corroborated by Yugoslav Partisan source authored by Jakšić), already before the outbreak of the World War II the local Bosniak leaders who joined Ustaše prepared a list of 200 Serbs who were to be killed. At the beginning of the World War II in Yugoslavia, Vlasenica and all of eastern Bosnia along with Sandžak in Serbia, became part of the Independent State of Croatia. The military units of the Independent State of Croatia in eastern Bosnia consisted of regular units of the Croatian Home Guard and members of the local Bosniak population who were recruited into units of Ustaše militia which distinguished itself in persecution of Serbs already at the very beginning of the war. The Serbs who lived in Vlasenica were not subjected to persecution immediately after the creation of the Independent State of Croatia, like Serbs in its other parts, because Vlasenica remained under control of the German forces until 22 June 1941. During the summer 1941 the genocide against Serbs in eastern Bosnia achieved wider scale in the region of Vlasenica, Birč and Zvornik.

== Massacres ==
On 22 June 1941, on the same day when German forces left Vlasenica, Ustaše from Sarajevo came to Vlasenica. The commander of local Ustaše forces was Mutevelić, a carpet salesman who already regularly visited Vlasenica before the war. Mutevelić was appointed as Ustaše commissar of Vlasenica District and organized extensive persecution of Serbs. He organized daily persecutions of prominent Serbs who were transported to improvised prison in Vlasenica and killed there or in Rašića Gaj. On 22 June 1941 the Ustaše captured seven most notable Serbs, including the local Orthodox priest Dušan Bobar and Serb Orthodox parish priests Dragomir J. Maskijević and Janko Savić, and killed all of them in Rašića Gaj.

Between 22 June and 20 July another 80 Serbs were killed there. The first group of prominent local Serbs killed by Ustaše in Rašića Gaj had 40 and another group 45 Serbs. They included Ljubo Jakšić, a parish priest from nearby Han Pijesak. Additional 200 residents of Vlasenica were imprisoned by Ustaše and sent to Jadovno and Slana concentration camps. The estimations of the number of Serbs killed in Rašića Gaj vary between at least 70 and 200. According to the testimony of one witness, the bodies of killed Serbs were thrown in one pit cave in Rašića Gaj.

== Aftermath ==
At the end of July and beginning of August 1941 another group of 50 Serbs from Vlasenica District (mostly from Milići) were imprisoned and murdered.

By 12 August 1941 more than hundred Serbs were killed in nearby Drinjača. According to Ivanisević, the basket full of Serb eyes seen by Italian war journalist Curzio Malaparte at Ante Pavelic's desk during his late-summer visit to Zagreb in 1941 and described in his autobiographical war novel Kaputt, were eyes of Serbs killed in Drinjača.

== Legacy ==
The massacres in Rašića Gaj were among the most shocking early World War II war crimes for Serbs in Eastern Bosnia. The testimonies about the cruel slaughter of Serbs in Rašića Gaj spread among the population of the region, causing fear and anger. Many Serbs considered all Bosniaks and Croats as Ustaše and threatened to kill them to avenge Serbs killed in Rašića Gaj.

The World War II massacres of Serbs by their Bosniaks neighbors and their accounts had very strong impact on local Serbs during the last War in Bosnia. According to the Srebrenica report of the Netherlands Institute for War Documentation, the choice of Rašića Gaj for execution of at least 21 Muslim men during 1990's War in Bosnia was maybe more than a mere coincidence.

== See also ==
- List of mass executions and massacres in Yugoslavia during World War II

== Sources ==
- Zekić, Miloš (1971). Istočna Bosna u NOB-u 1941-1945. Vojnoizdavački zavod.
- NIOD, Institute for War, Holocaust and Genocide Studies (2002). The Srebrenica report. The Netherlands Institute for War Documentation.
- Затезало, Ђуро (2011). "Источна Босна". Јадовно – Комплекс усташких логора 1941. Књига 1. Музеј Жртава Геноцида.
- Džomić, Velibor V. (1995). Ustaški zločini nad srbskim sveštenicima. Svetigora.
- Ivanišević, Milivoje (1994). Hronika našeg groblja ili Slovo o stradanju srpskog naroda Bratunca, Milića, Skelana i Srebrenice. Bratunac.
- Redžić, Enver (2005). Bosnia and Herzegovina in the Second World War. Psychology Press. ISBN 978-0-7146-5625-0.
- Kurdulija, Strahinja (1993). Atlas of the Ustasha genocide of the Serbs 1941-1945. Privredne vesti "Europublic". ISBN 978-86-7941-002-3.
