= Nova Kasaba =

Town in Republika Srpska, Bosnia and Herzegovina

Nova Kasaba Hoвa Кacaбa
- Town
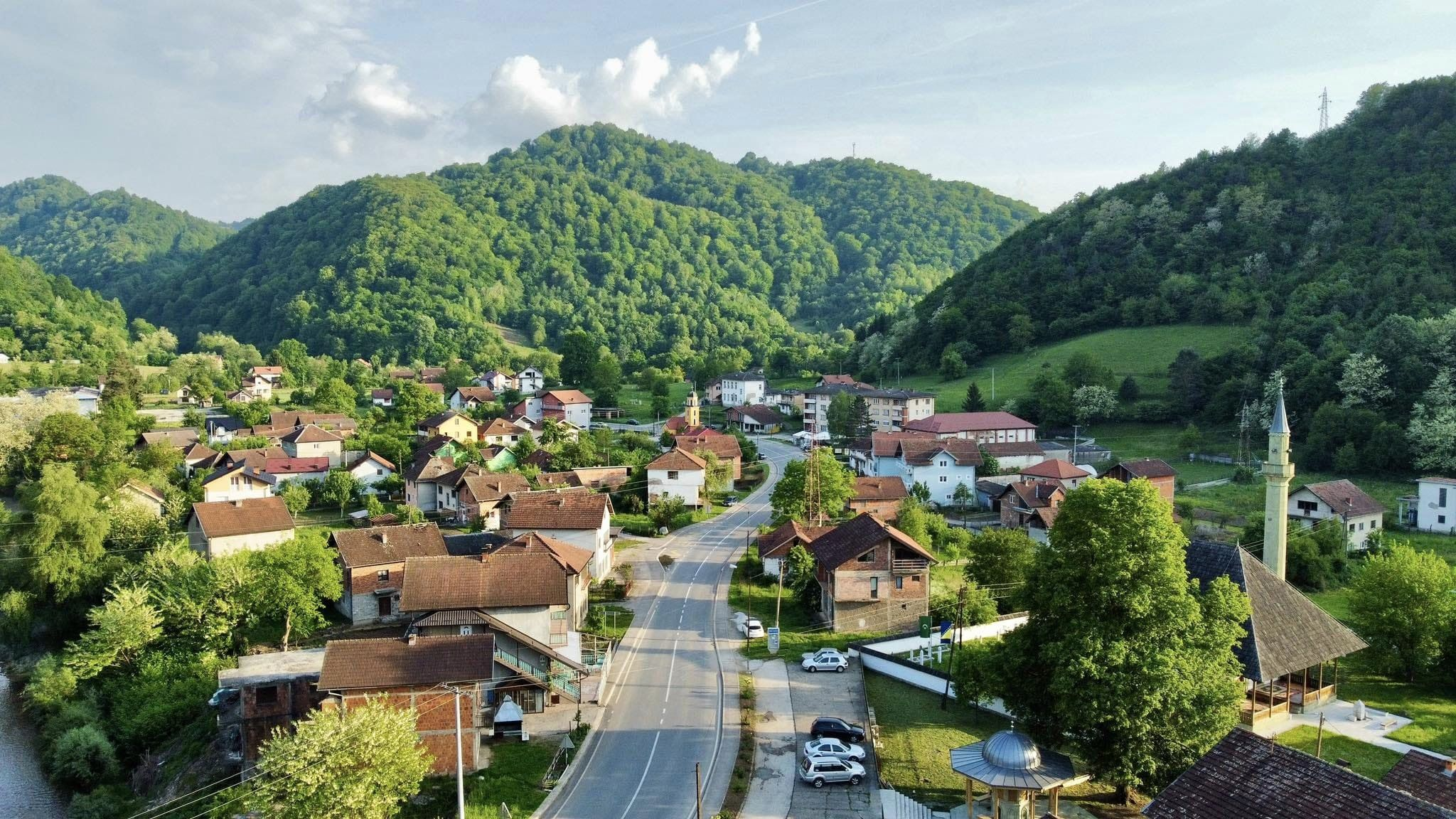
- Townscape of Nova Kasaba in 2024

- Location of Nova Kasaba within Republika Srpska (blue), Bosnia and Herzegovina
- Country: Bosnia and Herzegovina
- Entity: Republika Srpska
- Municipality: Milići

Population (2013)
  - Total: 558
- Time zone: UTC+1 (CET)
  - Summer (DST): UTC+2 (CEST)
- Area code: 56

Nova Kasaba (Serbian Cyrillic: Hoвa Кacaбa) is a Bosniak-majority town in Republika Srpska, in eastern Bosnia and Herzegovina. It is located on the main route from Belgrade to Sarajevo, along the Jadar river. The town was built around the Musa Pasha Mosque, a protected national monument of Republika Srpska. As of 2013, it had a population of 558 people.

In 1992, during the Bosnian War and genocide, Nova Kasaba was the site of a massacre of Bosniak men and boys. The football stadium in the town was also used as a temporary holding place for victims of the Srebrenica massacre.

== History ==
The origins of Nova Kasaba can be traced back to 1641, when Kara Musa Pasha, the Bosnian grand vizier of Buda for the Ottoman Empire, asked for permission to build a mosque and caravanserai in the Bosnian municipality of Sanjak in Birač district, near the village of Gojković. A caravanserai had previously existed in the area but burnt down, prompting travellers to use local housing for accommodations. Musa Pasha argued that the situation was slowly forcing locals out of the area; the Ottoman authorities agreed and approved his building plan and settlement permit. Construction began on 16 September 1641 and was completed on 29 May 1643. Residents gradually returned to the area, building new homes around the mosque. Written records of the construction, including Musa Pasha's permit and endowment from the government, are kept in Gazi Husrev Bey's Library in Sarajevo.

During the Bosnian War and genocide, Bosnian Serb forces massacred 29 Bosniak men and boys in Nova Kasaba on 17 May 1992. During the Srebrenica massacre, 1,200 Bosniak men and boys who had surrendered to Bosnian Serb forces in Srebrenica were taken as prisoners to the football stadium in Nova Kasaba from 11 to 12 July 1992. They were massacred the next day, on 13 July 1992. NATO helicopters took photographic evidence of the victims' imprisonment in the stadium. Zvonko Bajagić, a Bosnian Serb soldier present in Nova Kasaba at the time, corroborated the account the imprisonment in his witness testimony at the war tribunals in The Hague. Other witnesses also placed future Republika Srpska prime minister Radovan Višković near Nova Kasaba on 13 July 1992.

The government of Republika Srpska declared the Musa Pasha Mosque a national monument at the end of their session on the preservation of national monuments held from 21 to 27 January 2003. The designation was made amid negotiations on a general framework for peace in Bosnia and Herzegovina. It legally bound the Republika Srpska government to restore and protect the mosque from damage. The mosque had previously been under the state protection of the Socialist Republic of Bosnia and Herzegovina from 1951 to 1992, during the Yugoslav era.

== Demographics ==
The pre-war population of Nova Kasaba in 1991 was 1,042; 814 identified as Bosniaks (78.12%), 76 as Serbs (7.29%) 11 as Yugoslavs (1.06%), and 141 as other (13.53%). The 2013 census recorded a population of 558 residents: 481 Bosniaks (86.2%), 64 Serbs (11.5%), 1 Croat (0.2%), and 12 others (2.2%).

== Transport ==
Nova Kasaba rests along the banks of the Jadar river, on the main road from the Serbian capital of Belgrade to the Bosnian capital of Sarajevo.
