= Bešić =

- Pronunciation: [běːʃitɕ]
- Language: Bosnian

Bešić is a Bosniak surname. Notable people with the surname include:

- Adnan Bešić (born 1991), Slovenian professional footballer
- Alen Bešić (born 1975), Serbian literary critic, translator and poet
- Alija Bešić (born 1975), Luxembourgish professional footballer
- Danijel Bešič Loredan (born 1973), Slovenian orthopedic surgeon and politician
- Enes Bešić (born 1963), Bosnian professional footballer
- Hamza Bešić (born 2000), Bosnian footballer
- Muhamed Bešić (born 1992), Bosnian professional footballer
- Mustafa Bešić (born 1951), Bosnian ice hockey player

== See also ==
- Bešići
