= Zvečaj Fortress =

Medieval castle in Bosnia and Herzegovina

Zvečaj fortress
- Rekavice; Bosnia and Herzegovina
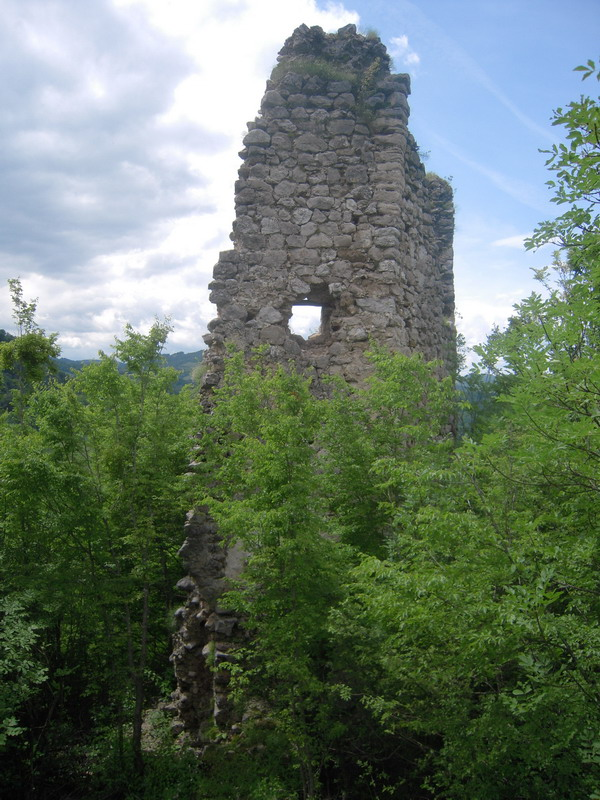
- Ostaci tvrđave Zvečaj

Site information
- Type: town-fortress
- Owner: The Government of Bosnia and Herzegovina
- Condition: Ruin

Location
- Coordinates: 44.67163240742389°N 17.16024523561484°E

Site history
- Built: Unknown-12th century
- Built by: (unknown)
- In use: Until 19th cen.
- Materials: limestone in dry stone walling
- Battles/wars: Battle of Banja Luka (1737)
- Site is on a provisional list of protected National Monument of Bosnia and Herzegovina by the Government of BiH and its KONS

Zvečaj fortress is a ruined castle in Rekavice, Bosnia and Herzegovina. It was a strategically very important fortress in medieval Bosnia. Its ruins can still be found on the southern side of the steep slope in the Vrbas canyon. They are located about 10 km upstream from Banjaluka, or 40 km downstream from Jajce.

== History and significance ==
Bearing in mind (for construction at that time) the unfavorable configuration of the terrain, Zvečaj was a spacious, irregularly shaped fortress, purposefully integrated into the rocky environment. Its crumbling remains are neglected and decaying.

This fortress was located in a very significant position, near the upstream entrance to the Vrbas canyon, in the Tijesno locality (behind Krupa on Vrbas). This is evidenced by the remains of three well-fortified towns: Zvečaj, Bočac and Greben. The entrance to the Vrbasa canyon, on the Banjaluka-Jajce route, is narrow and to this day the rest is really narrow, because a vertical and high rock rises right next to the bed of the Vrbasa.

Zvečaj was first mentioned on January 15, 1404, as the court of the Grand Duke of Bosnia, Hrvoje Vukčić Hrvatinić, when an alliance was signed with the people of Dubrovnik against King Stjepan Ostoja. After 15 years (March 15, 1419), Ostoj's son received the Dubrovnik envoys there and confirmed their previous privileges.

When Ključ fell in 1463, Zvečaj was occupied by the Ottomans, who stationed a crew of 50 janissaries and 30 other soldiers and appointed Konstantin of Ostrovica, writer of a well-known chronicle, as the commander. At the end of the same year, along with some other Bosnian towns, it was occupied by King Matthias Corvinus. He also stayed in Zvečaj during his invasion of the Balkans in 1480. In the Ottoman-Hungarian treaty of 1519, Zvečaj, Banjaluka and Vrbas (Orbasz; Banya Lwka, Zweczay cum castro Verbaz) are also mentioned as having belonged to King Louis II.

The Ottomans recaptured Zvečaj in 1528, during the governorship of Gazi Husrev-bey, when Andrija Dresneky surrendered it without resistance. That is why King Ferdinand I declared him a traitor and confiscated his possessions in Požega County, as evidenced by a document signed on 10 February 1528. There are no documents about the further fate of Zvečaj, until Battle of Banja Luka.

Zvečaj played an extremely important role in many defensive battles around Banja Luka and in Bosnia in general, including the Battle of Banja Luka in 1737.

The battle took place under Banja Luka on 4 August 1737, and the Bosnian Ottoman army won a key victory in five assaults against Austria-Hungary. Around 1,300 dead were left behind on the side of the defeated Austro-Hungarian army. In the battle, the Bosnian Ottoman army won key victories in spite of an order from Istanbul that they should not offer resistance and Austria-Hungary having called on the Christian population not to participate in the defense of Bosnia. Bosnian Vizier Hećimoglu Ali Pasha (Turkish: Hekimoğlu Ali Paşa) expected that the Austrian army would attack Bosnia. On his own initiative, he summoned all the captains and ajans to a meeting in Travnik. Since he could not get help from Istanbul, he organized the defense of Bosnia with his own forces. Relatively quickly, he gathered around 10,000 soldiers on a grassy field just outside of Banja Luka. All the captains in the Ottoman Bosnian army responded to the call. The Austrian forces consisted of about 14,000 well-equipped soldiers.

Although they were attacked from several directions, from the North across the Sava and from the East across the Drina, Ali Pasha and the other leaders organized an effective defense, and in a counterattack completely beat the enemy army. For the next 150 years, Austria-Hungary would not attempt to enter Bosnia. Only in 1878, after the Congress of Berlin and during the decline of the Ottoman Empire, would Austria-Hungary again enter Bosnia.

== See also ==
- Vrbaški Grad
- Bočac
- Kotor Castle
- Vrbanjci
- Šiprage
