= Rašića Gaj =

Rašića Gaj (Рашића Гај) is a village in Bosnia and Herzegovina. It is located in the municipality of Vlasenica and in the Republika Srpska region. According to the first results of the 2013 Bosnian census, it has 49 inhabitants.

== History ==
During summer 1941 happened the Rašića Gaj massacres of Serbs committed by the Ustaše (contemporary Independent State of Croatia).

Historical population
Year	1961	1971	1981	1991	2013
Pop.	154	200	216	218	49
±%	—	+29.9%	+8.0%	+0.9%	−77.5%

== See also ==
- List of cities in Bosnia and Herzegovina
- Municipalities in Bosnia and Herzegovina
