= Maglaj Fortress =

Fortress in Maglaj, Bosnia and Herzegovina

- Maglaj, Bosnia and Herzegovina
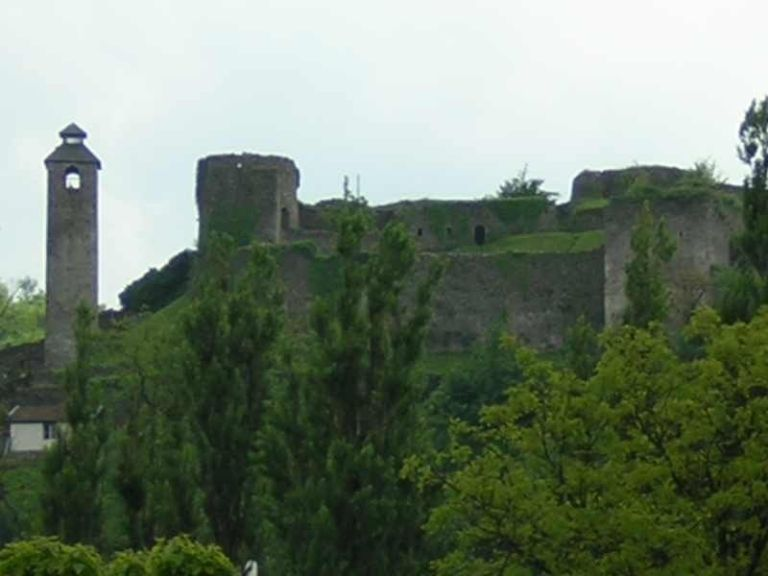
- Maglaj Fortress

Location
- Coordinates: 44.543°N 18.102°E

Garrison information
- Designations

KONS of Bosnia and Herzegovina
- Official name: Old Maglaj fort, the architectural ensemble
- Type: Category II immovable cultural monument
- Criteria: A, B, D i.iv, F ii.iii., G v., H i.
- Designated: 31 August 2005 (?th kons session; decision No. 05.2-2-78/04-5)
- Reference no.: 2582
- List of National Monuments of Bosnia and Herzegovina

Maglaj Fortress (Serbo-Croatian: Maglajska tvrđava / Маглајска тврђава) is a large castle complex in the Municipality of Maglaj in Bosnia and Herzegovina. Maglaj fortress is 182 metres (597 ft) above sea level.

== See also ==
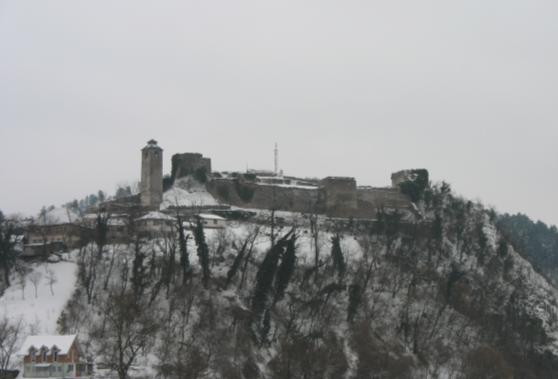
Maglaj fortress in winter

- List of castles in Bosnia and Herzegovina

== Sources ==
- Mehmed Mujezinović, Islamska epigrafika u BiH, II, Sarajevo-Publishing, Sarajevo. 1998., str. 244.
- Ismet Bušatlić, Prilozi historiji školstva i obrazovanja u Maglaju i okolini, Naučni skup-historijsko trajanje Bosne i Maglaja, Maglaj, 2008.
- Ivo Bojanovski, Stari grad Maglaj, Naše starine, X, Sarajevo, 1962. i 1963., str. 61. i 62
