= Battle of Banja Luka =

Battle in 1737 in the Austro-Turkish-Russian war

- Part of the Russo-Turkish War (1735–1739)
Date	4 August 1737; 289 years ago
Location	Banja Luka, Bosnia Eyalet, Ottoman Empire (present-day Bosnia and Herzegovina) 44°46′N 17°11′E
Result	Ottoman victory

Belligerents
Ottoman Empire: Bosnian militia	(Habsburg monarchy) Austria

Commanders and leaders
Hekimoğlu Ali Pasha	Joseph of Saxe-Hildburghausen; Maximilian Ulysses Browne

Strength
20,000 (Note: not including local militias) (relief force); 5,000 (garrison)	13,000–20,000

Casualties and losses
600	988–1,000 dead or wounded (Note: 922 men and 66 Austrian officers died on the battlefield, or up to 1,000 dead and wounded) or 1,300 dead (includes 1,000 drowned) and 1,200 wounded

The Battle of Banja Luka (Turkish: Banaluka Muharebesi, Serbo-Croatian: Banjolučki boj) took place in Banja Luka, Ottoman Bosnia, on 4 August 1737, during the Austro-Russian-Turkish War. An Austrian army under Prince Joseph Hildberghausen was defeated, as it attempted to besiege the town, when it ran into a large Ottoman relief force led by Italian vizier Hekimoğlu Ali Pasha.

The Bosnian population was aware that Austrian forces would invade Bosnia during the war; to be exact, the energetic Bosnian vizier Hekimoğlu Ali Pasha predicted in 1737 that, without a declaration of war, a large Austrian army of over 14,000 soldiers would attack Bosnia. That was why he called a meeting in Travnik with the Bosnian captains and ayans to plan the defense. At this council, all captains and ayans ultimately demanded that all preparations for defense be carried out immediately, without the knowledge and consent of the Porte; thus, the Ottoman forces were planning the defense without the help of Istanbul. The vizier declared a defense in the territory of Bosnia, and quickly gathered about 10,000 soldiers in the grassland. All captains in the then Bosnian army responded to the call. After the battle took place, the Bosniak army had won an absolute victory. Five assaults broke the Austrian force and forced it to flight, leaving 1,300 dead with the great heroism of Bosnian captains and combatants. The Battle of Banja Luka is considered to be one of the most important events in the history of Bosniaks.

== Cause ==
While the Ottoman Empire was exhausted economically by the numerous wars (Kandy, Vienna War), the so-called "European balance" of the military forces had been established. Austria-Hungary and Russia took the lead in this. At the end of the Vienna War, Slavonia, Lika, Krbava and Dalmatia belonged to Austro-Hungary; the Bosnian eyalet practically had lost all territory west of the Danube – with the exception of Banat. Consequently, the Bosnian eyalet became the westernmost and most prominent possession in the Ottoman Empire. Bosniak soldiers fought mostly on other fronts; about 10,000 were sent to fight Russia, and only a small number returned. The Bosniak population did not trust that the Ottoman Empire would send reinforcements in the event of an attack.

Austria-Hungary envisioned 3 military operations in the Balkans:

1. Occupation of the Sanjak of Smederevo;
2. Occupation of Erdelj, Wallachia and Moldova;
3. Complete conquest of the Bosnia Eyalet.

== Declaration of War ==
Austria officially declared war on 14 July 1737. There were already 17,000 Austrian soldiers in Pakrac, and that number had grown rapidly. Commander was Joseph Hildburghausen, who on 15 July invited Catholic and Orthodox subjects in the Bosnian Eyalet to join his army. He also sent a message to congregants of the Muslim faith that in the event of a change of religion, they would retain their property:

"zakon vire svoie mesta imati nemože i ova iest temelita i milostiva volia i pamet naša [the law of faith of one cannot have place and this is thorough and gracious will and wit of ours]"

== Austrian troops offensive ==
On 10 July, Austrian troops embarked on a march; after two days they reached Gradiška. Heavy rains fell and there was some minor resistance from the local Bosnian Muslim population, causing the Austrians difficulties in crossing the Sava. Five days later, the crossing succeeded, and with no more significant resistance they headed towards Banja Luka. The Austrian army reached Kijevci, where Hildburghausen sent General von Muffling with 7 infantry battalions, of which 3 battalions consisted of Croatian allies, 400 horsemen and 4 cannons – to take a detour to protect the Austrian army from a surprise attack.

=== First skirmish ===
On 20 July, the Austrian army advanced towards Jurkovići. This is where the first significant battle with the Bosniak army, commanded by Sali Aga, took place. Sali Aga had three groups of 1,000, 2,000 and 5,000 soldiers at his disposal, which surprised the Austrians. Sali Aga and Muffling fought each other and both were wounded. Sali Aga died immediately, while Muffling succumbed two days later. The battle was an Austrian victory.

=== Siege of Banja Luka ===
Two formations of the Austrian army – one under the command of Field Marshal Goldy and the other under Hildburghausen – joined in front of Banja Luka on 27 July. One kilometer from the Banja Luka fortress, the Austrian army raised a camp. Hildburghausen demanded that the city surrender unconditionally, which the defenders refused. The siege of the city began, and after three days the Austrians regrouped forces and on 27 July began artillery fire at the fort. Between 27 July and 4 August, approximately 1,800 shells were fired daily.

The defense of Banja Luka was commanded by Mehmed-beg Ćatić; in the early days, the defenders gave very aggressive resistance to the Austrian army. The cannon gunners of the Austrian army did not aim precisely but when the cannons were moved forward, the city center was targeted, forcing the civilian population to retreat deep into the underground walls.

Hildburghausen sent a letter to Captain Ćatić, demanding his surrender:

To Pasha, who showed great effort in safeguarding the fortress of Banja Luka, to the officers who along with him find themselves obsessed with the fort and the brave fighters, greetings with good wishes. The obligation of friendship requires us to warn you because you have become aware of the forces of the Imperial army and equipment. So far, you have put a lot of effort into enduring what came there for you. As much you put in your strength and heart, there is that much. But, know, after that, whatever effort you make to preserve the fort – it will be vain work. Your effort is not enough to resist us, it will not really help you. With your Pasha, whose help you hope for, there are three thousand soldiers. I, at this moment, have four experienced generals. It is sufficient that any of they come out before your Pasha. There is no way he can resist it. Now one of our units is preparing against Bužim fortress and the other strong unit, with many army, besieges the fort of Cetingrad. News will arrive today or tomorrow that they passed into our hands. In addition, to a large and powerful army of emperors the commander is Prince of Lorraine, who is tasked with occupying the Ottoman lands in Rumelia. These days, he and his army are leaving Belgrade to occupy Niš, and then he should go and take Vidin. To know about this condition, now certificates were received from that side by one special tap. If you want to we send them to convince you... And so there's no way [for you] to save yourself, whatever you do, we will take away the fort from you. You are trying in vain to prolong the destruction of people. All left you have to do is to give the fort to us, so that we can confidently point you where you want, with your heads, souls and property. Unless you listen to our words and are persistent and stubborn, we will kill you all and crush your root. Don't say you didn't know.

Ćatić's officers declared they would not surrender and Hildburghausen received an answer:

The fort belongs to a bright, powerful, noble Islamic Padshah, who attained the grace of God. Our blessed fortress, which under its umbrella protects our children, the homeland left over from our grandfathers, we do not give by our hands to the enemy. We have a solid heart decision for this way, to sacrifice souls and lives for Islam and while there is anyone alive among us, we will not give up the fight.

=== Hekimoğlu Ali Pasha arrives to help ===
After the Austrians received news that Hekimoğlu Ali Pasha had set off with 15,000 troops to help the Banja Luka people, the city was even more heavily targeted. Ćatić sent a letter to the Travnik vizier, which was carried through enemy lines by disguised Bosniak soldiers. However, the letter did not reach the vizier because they had already met the army of Hekimoğlu Ali Pasha and it had been handed over to him. On 3 August, Hildburghausen's scouts informed him that unknown soldiers were spotted in the surrounding woods, but he made the fatal decision not to follow it further. This enabled the Bosniak army to approach the Austrian camp unnoticed.

Hildburghausen expected (though he misjudged the timing) that help would arrive for the Bosniak army, and he regrouped the soldiers. Generals Succoi and Rommer guarded the right flank while Major General Baranyay shifted the artillery to the left bank of Vrbas. A considerable number of soldiers were left in reserve. While the Austrians regrouped, the defense troops did the same.

The right wing of the army, which came to the aid of the defenders, was commanded by Krajina Captain Mehmed Bey Fidahić; 4th sanjak of the Bosnian eyalet was placed on the left wing. Among the soldiers were ulema, muderis, etc. There were also Orthodox people faithful to the Bosnian Eyalet and Franciscans who provided material assistance to the army.

Prior to the arrival of the relief force, the ratio of attackers to defenders was about 3 to 1; the Austrian army had about 17,000 and the Bosniak had 5,000 men.

=== Main battle ===
As soon as troops under the command of Hekimoğlu Ali Pasha attacked the Austrian army on the morning of 4 August, the defenders began to attack on the left bank of the Vrbas. Austrian troops, under the command of Baranyay, repelled the onslaught of the defenders. During the battle, the Austrian officers deviated from the plan set by Hildburghausen, thereby unknowingly assisting the defenders; a big mistake was made by Baranyay by not deploying his infantry. One part of the Austrian army was not following the original orders, so a disturbance was caused in their ranks, and it was not possible for the army to establish a single infantry line. Bosniak cavalry used this and attacked the Austrian army center, causing them great losses.

When the defenders managed to occupy the pontoon bridge, the Austrian troops on the left bank of the Vrbas began to retreat. Mehmed Pasha, who noticed this, attacked fiercely the Austrian troops who were still resisting.

Hildburghausen ordered his troops to reinforce the left bank of the Vrbas, thereby aiding Baranyay. This move by Hildburghausen was later regarded as a major mistake of his, as it turned out that Baranyay was strategically incapable and unable to use these reinforcements.

The Austrian army on the left bank of the Vrbas was trying to escape by crossing the river, but many could not swim and drowned in the river. Five soldiers each held the horses' tail to cross the river. The right wing offered even considerable resistance; the defenders carried out five attacks during the day. On the evening of 4 August, The Austrian commander Hildburghausen eventually realized that he could not prevent reinforcements from entering Banja Luka, and withdrew.

=== Chase after the Austrian army ===
Austrian expedition withdraws with very heavy losses, Mehmed Ali-Pasha ordered on 5 August to pursue the fleeing Austrians. As the Bosniak troops went partly unorganized in the pursuit, 500 soldiers were lost near Klašnica when they reached the Austrian troops. The Bosnians then continued pursuing the Austrians toward Gradiška and eventually entered the borders of Croatia. On 13 August, Hildburghausen arrived in Slavonska Gradiška, where he awaited the rest of the army until 20 August

=== Consequences ===
About 600 city's defenders were killed; one account estimates that the Austrian expedition overall lost more than 6,000 men. An unknown number of Austrian soldiers according to estimates, 1,000 from Hildburghausen's camp alone drowned in the Vrbas. At least 1,200 soldiers were wounded. Bosniak forces remain active, including attacks such as the assault on Šabac.

The Bosniak army seized 12 cannons, 315 tents, thousands of barrels, and many rifles, sabers and other military equipment. The Croatian Ban Josip Esterházy, who left Bužim after the defeat of the Austrian army, explained the defeat by the lack of heavy artillery. Austrian officers cited lack of discipline among soldiers as the main reason.
