= Birač (region) =

Region of eastern Bosnia and Herzegovina

Coordinates: 44°08′N 19°03′E

Birač (Serbian Cyrillic: Бирач) is a region of eastern Bosnia and Herzegovina comprising the municipalities of Milići, Vlasenica, Srebrenica, Bratunac, Zvornik and Šekovići.

== History ==
=== Yugoslavia ===
In November 1990 multi-party elections were held in Bosnia and Herzegovina for the first time since the Second World War. The principal element of the political platform of the SDS was the goal of unifying ethnic Serbs in a common state. The outcome of the election meant that the SDS would not be able to ensure that Bosnia and Herzegovina continue to be part of a Serb-dominated Yugoslavia through democratic and peaceful means alone. The Bosnian Serbs began to organise certain areas of BiH into formal regional structures as "Associations of Municipalities", a form of structure that was already provided for under the 1974 Yugoslav constitutional regime. These Associations were nominally non-ethnic but were the first step toward establishing separate Bosnian Serb governmental bodies in Bosnia and Herzegovina.

In September 1991, the various Associations of Municipalities were transformed into Serbian Autonomous Oblasts (SAOs). On 9 November 1991 Birac was designated an SAO and on 21 November 1991 the Bosnian Serb Assembly established Birač as a Serbian Autonomous Oblast and merged it with the Oblast of Romanija to form the Serb Autonomous Region of Romanija-Birac.

On 9 January 1992, the Bosnian Serb Assembly adopted a declaration proclaiming the Serbian Republic of Bosnia and Herzegovina (SRBiH). On 28 February 1992 the Constitution of the Serbian Republic of BiH declared that the territory of the SRBiH included "the territories of the Serbian Autonomous Regions and Districts and of other Serbian ethnic entities in Bosnia and Herzegovina" and that it was part of the Socialist Federal Republic of Yugoslavia. On 12 August 1992 the SRBiH's name was changed to Republika Srpska. The Serb Autonomous Region of Romanija-Birač became part of Republika Srpska.

== Sources ==
- М. Филиповић, Град и предео Бирач, Југословенски историјски часопис 1939
