= Vlasenica =

Vlasenica Власеница
- Town and municipality
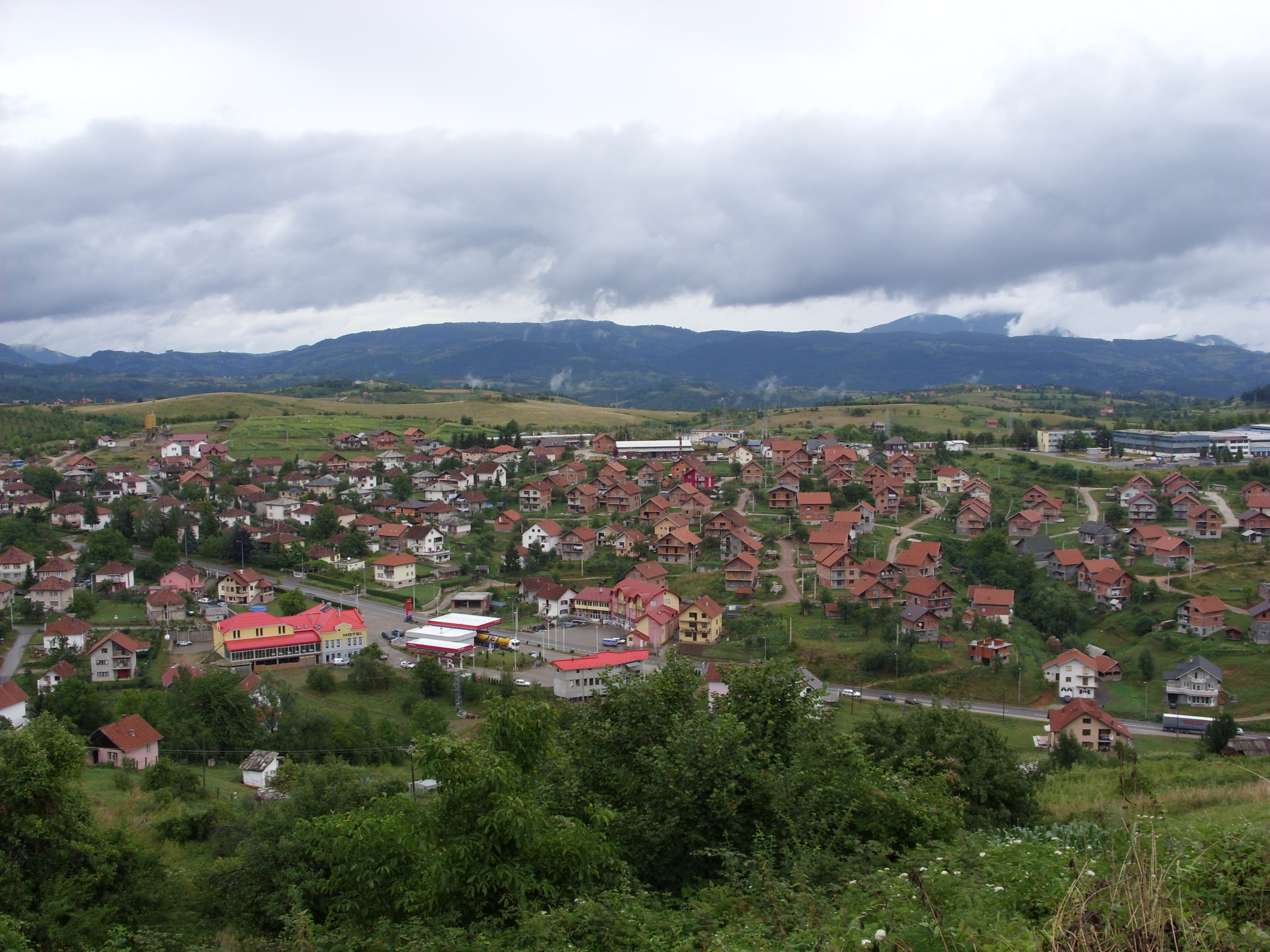
- Vlasenica

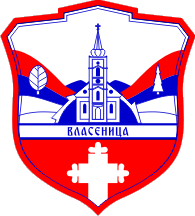
- Coat of arms

- Location of Vlasenica within Bosnia and Herzegovina

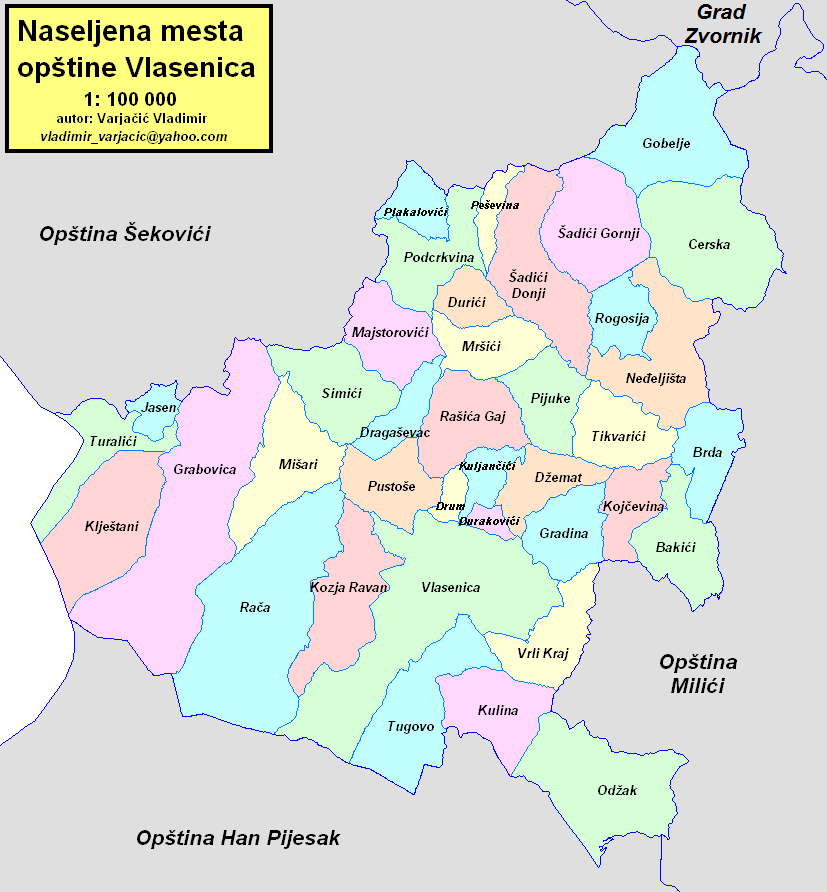
- Coordinates: 44°11′N 18°56′E
- Country: Bosnia and Herzegovina
- Entity: Republika Srpska

Government
  - Municipal mayor: Miroslav Kraljevic (SNSD)

Area
  - Total: 448.14 km^{2} (173.03 sq mi)

Population (2013 census)
  - Total: 11,467
  - Density: 25.588/km^{2} (66.273/sq mi)
- Time zone: UTC+1 (CET)
  - Summer (DST): UTC+2 (CEST)
- Area code: 56
- Website: www.opstina-vlasenica.org

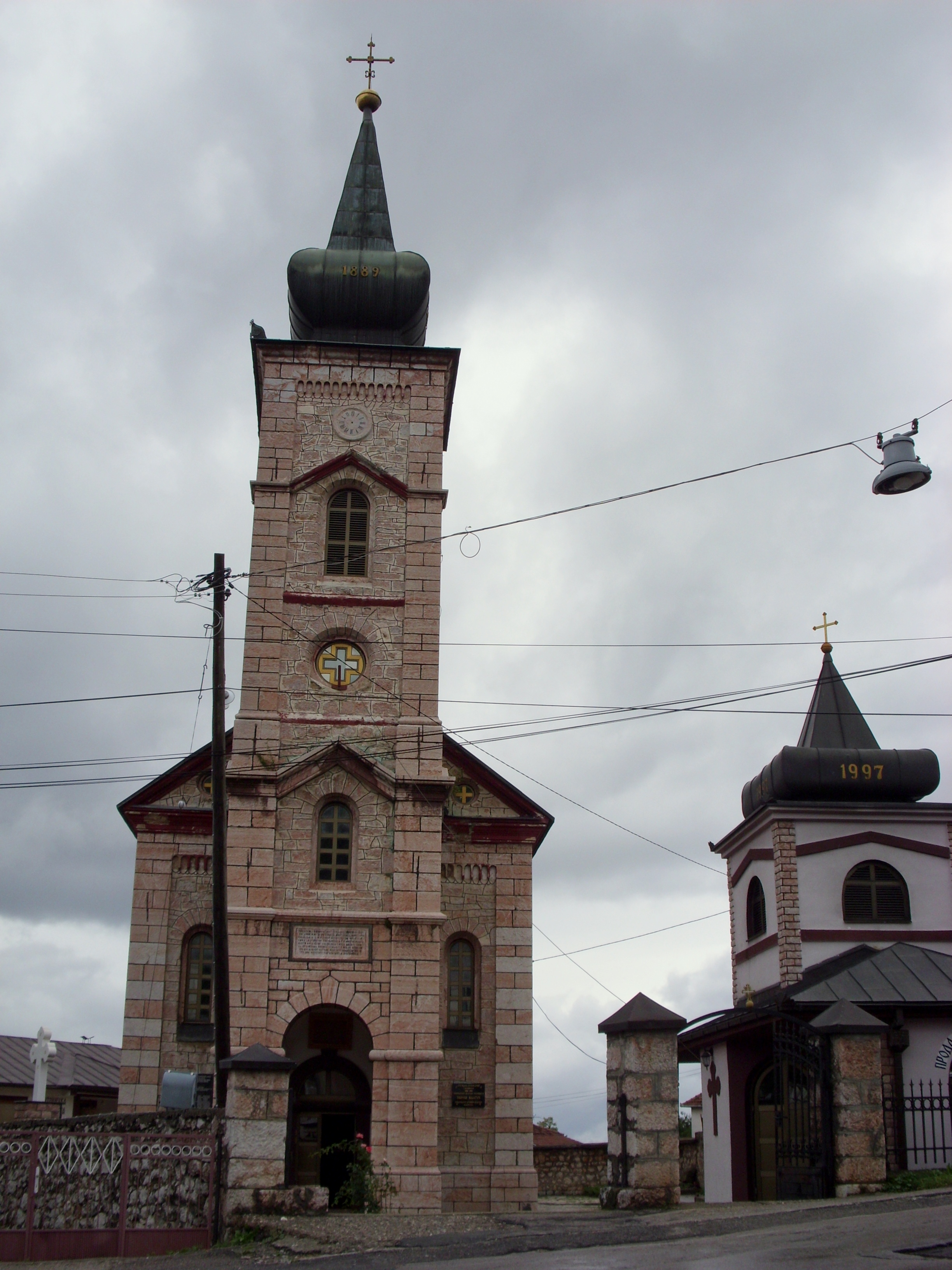
Vlasenica church

Vlasenica (Serbian Cyrillic: Власеница) is a town and municipality in Republika Srpska, Bosnia and Herzegovina. As of 2013, it has a population of 11,467 inhabitants, while the town of Vlasenica has a population of 7,228 inhabitants.

== Etymology ==
The name of the town derives from the Serbo-Croatian word for Festuca, vlasulja, a plant native to the area.

== History ==
=== World War II ===
Some 70-200 Serbs were brutally massacred by Ustaše forces in Vlasenica's Rašića Gaj municipality between 22 June and 20 July 1941, after raping women and girls. At the end of July and beginning of August 1941 another group of 50 Serbs from Vlasenica District (mostly from Milići) were imprisoned and murdered. Between 2,000 and 3,000 Muslims were massacred by Serb Chetniks in Vlasenica, from December 1941 until February 1942.

=== Yugoslav War ===
The Susica detention camp was established near Vlasenica in 1992. In its one year of existence, over 1,000 Bosniaks were reported to be killed in the brutal prison camp. During the course of the Yugoslav wars, 2.500 Bosniaks were killed in Vlasenica and the surrounding area.

== Demographics ==
=== Population ===
Population of settlements – Vlasenica municipality
	Settlement	1879.	1885.	1895	1910.	1921.	1931.	1948.	1953.	1961.	1971.	1981.	1991.	2013.
	Total	19,420	23,085	24,927	30,928	28,865	37,532				26,623	30,498	33,817	11,467
1	Cerska												1,409	689
2	Grabovica												537	342
3	Gradina												755	395
4	Neđeljišta												738	354
5	Pustoše												552	208
6	Vlasenica							4,121	7,283	3,047	3,976	6,000	7,909	7,228

=== Ethnic composition ===
Ethnic composition – Vlasenica town
	2013.	1991.	1981.	1971.
Total	7,228 (100,0%)	7,909 (100,0%)	6,000 (100,0%)	3,976 (100,0%)
Bosniaks/Muslims		4,800 (60,69%)	3,435 (57,25%)	2,774 (69,77%)
Serbs		2,743 (34,68%)	1,793 (29,88%)	1,124 (28,27%)
Yugoslavs		242 (3,060%)	578 (9,633%)	5 (0,126%)
Others		98 (1,239%)	22 (0,367%)	25 (0,629%)
Croats		26 (0,329%)	18 (0,300%)	12 (0,302%)
Roma			98 (1,633%)	25 (0,629%)
Montenegrins			28 (0,467%)	7 (0,176%)
Albanians			22 (0,367%)	3 (0,075%)
Hungarians			3 (0,050%)	
Slovenes			2 (0,033%)	
Macedonians			1 (0,017%)	1 (0,025%)

Ethnic composition – Vlasenica municipality
	2013.	1991.	1981.	1971.
Total	11,467 (100,0%)	17,761 (100,0%)	30,498 (100,0%)	26,623 (100,0%)
Serbs	7,589 (66,18%)	6,311 (35,53%)	13,531 (44,37%)	13,431 (50,45%)
Bosniaks/Muslims	3,763 (32,82%)	10,897 (61,35%)	15,337 (50,29%)	12,881 (48,38%)
Others	84 (0,733%)	249 (1,402%)	131 (0,430%)	151 (0,567%)
Croats	31 (0,270%)	32 (0,180%)	44 (0,144%)	42 (0,158%)
Yugoslavs		272 (1,531%)	978 (3,207%)	17 (0,064%)
Roma			352 (1,154%)	53 (0,199%)
Montenegrins			81 (0,266%)	28 (0,105%)
Albanians			33 (0,108%)	14 (0,053%)
Hungarians			5 (0,016%)	1 (0,004%)
Slovenes			4 (0,013%)	3 (0,011%)
Macedonians			2 (0,007%)	2 (0,008%)

== Economy ==
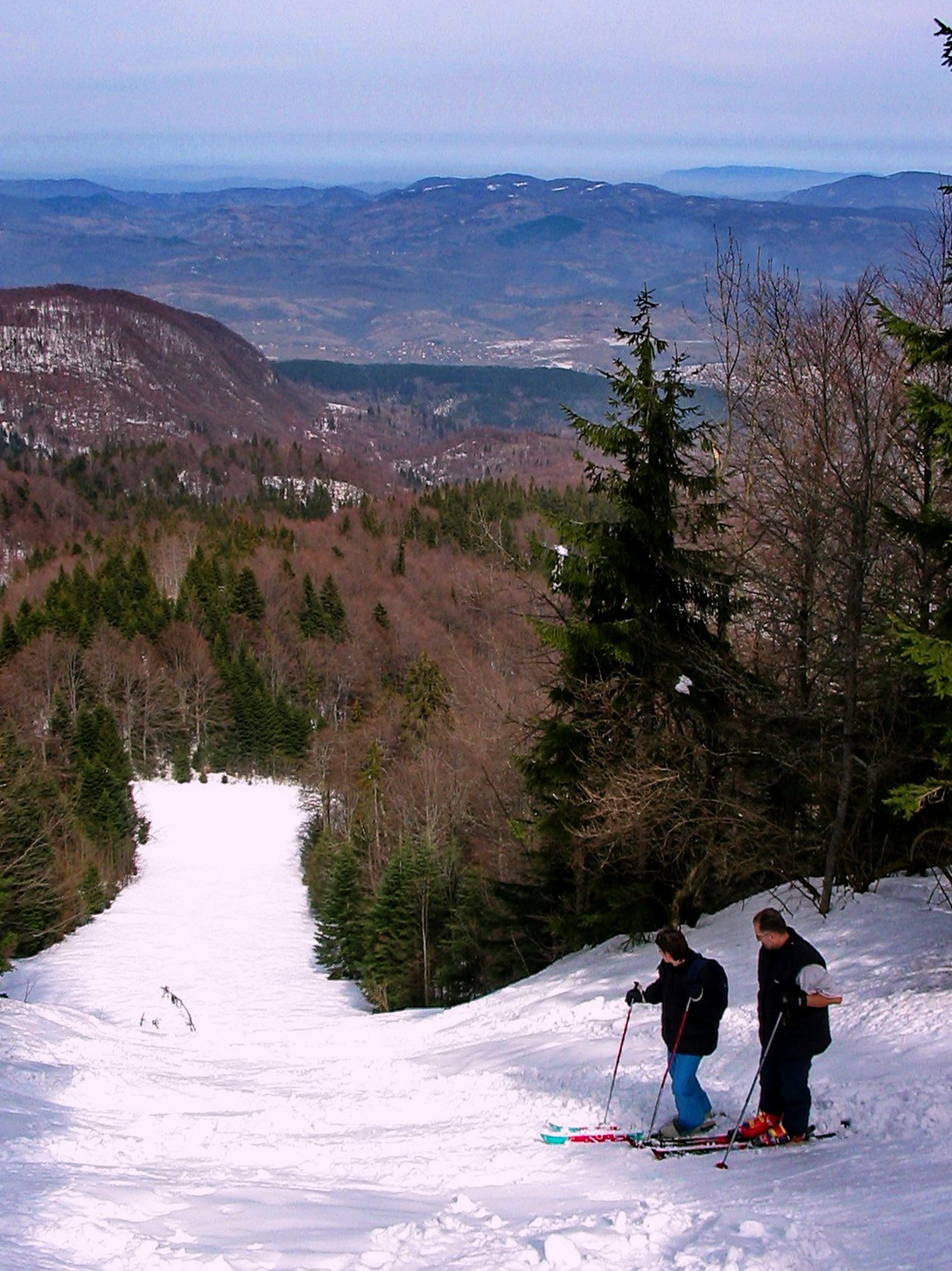
Skiing in Vlasenica

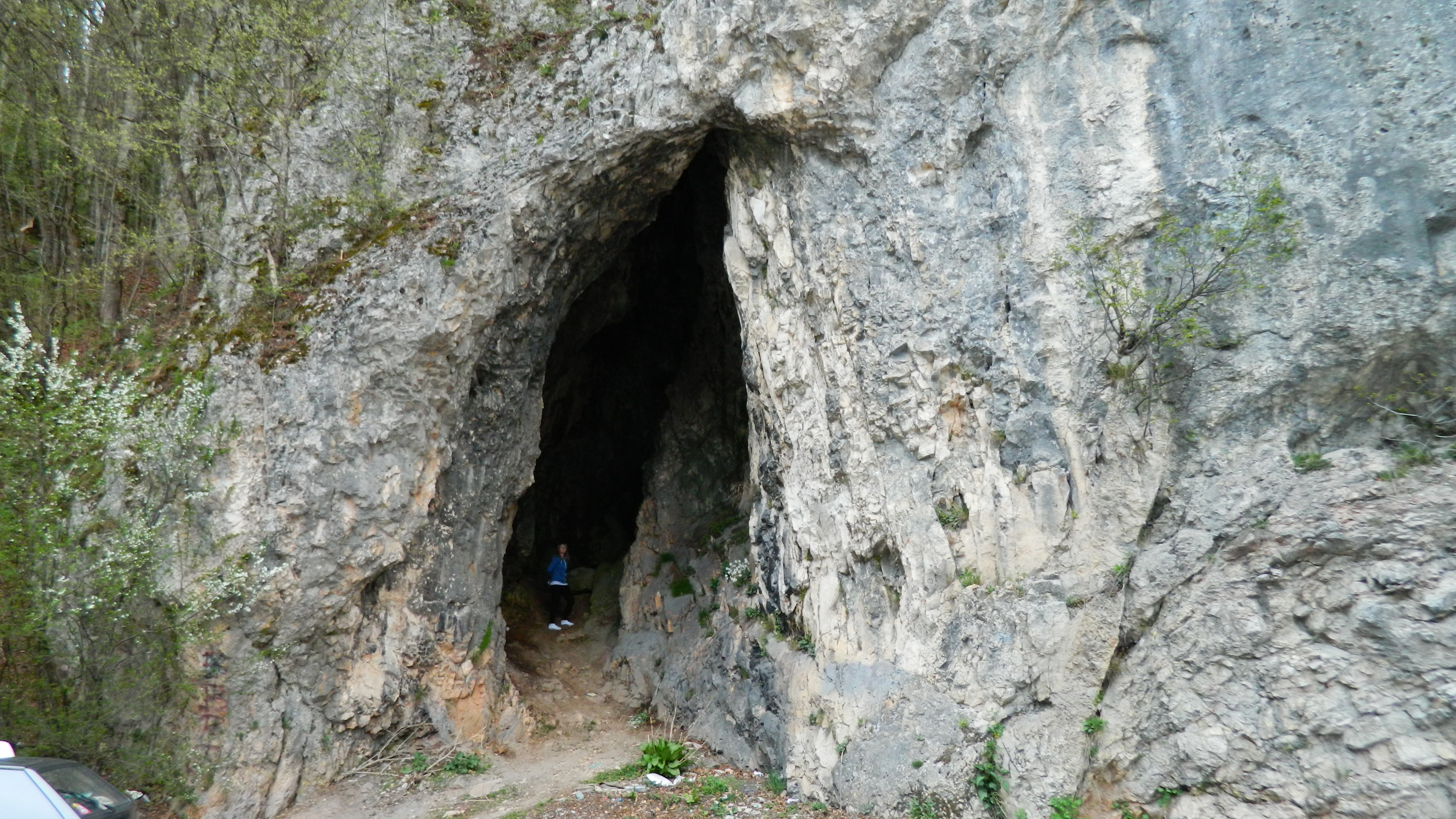
Javor cave

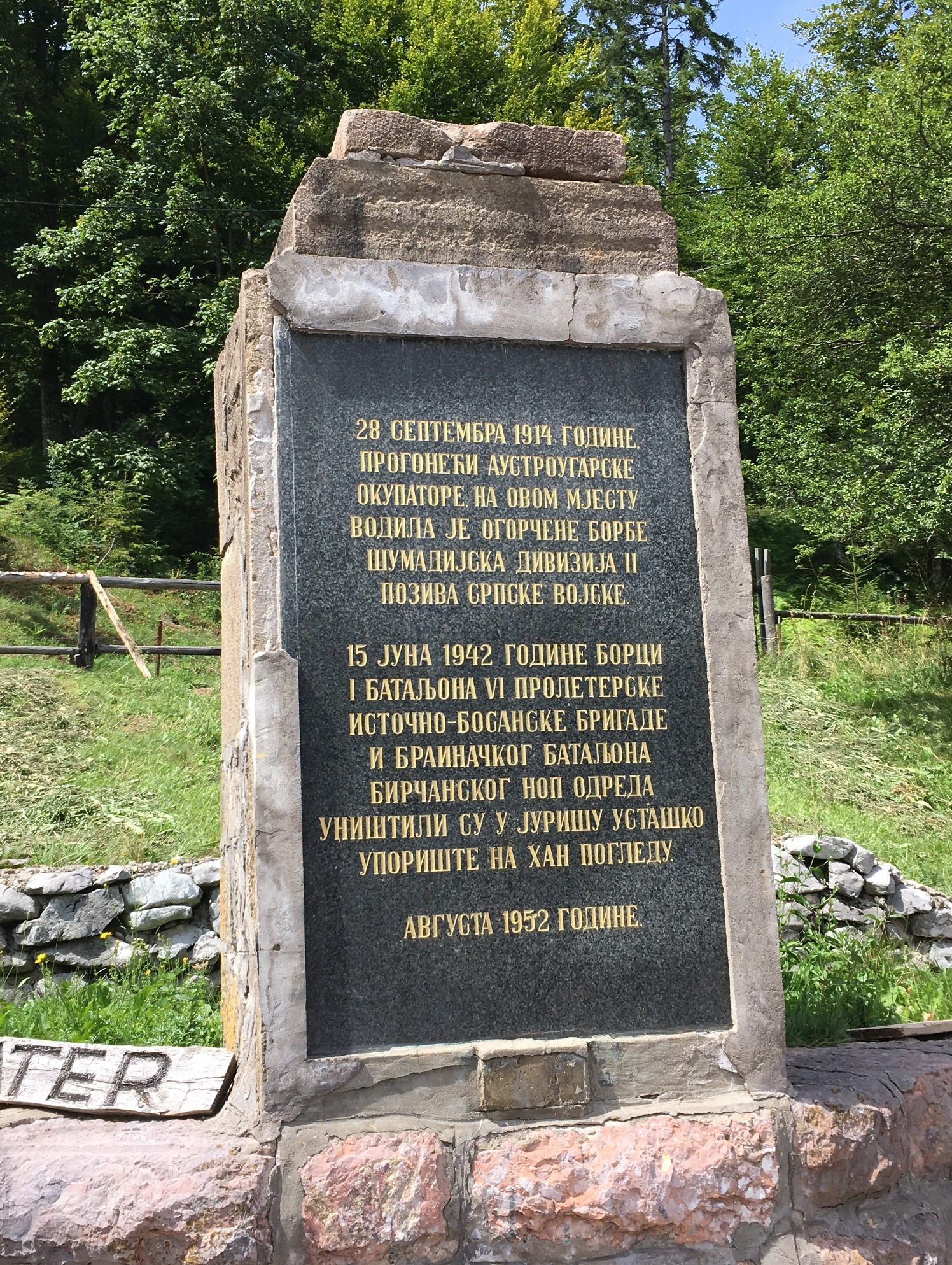
Monument in Vlasenica in the honour of the victory of the Serbian army against Austro-Hungarian invaders and Yugoslav Partisans who destroyed the Croatian Ustaše in a battle which took place in modern-day Vlasenica

The following table gives a preview of total number of registered people employed in legal entities per their core activity (as of 2018):

Activity	Total
Agriculture, forestry and fishing	108
Mining and quarrying	-
Manufacturing	257
Electricity, gas, steam and air conditioning supply	86
Water supply; sewerage, waste management and remediation activities	56
Construction	28
Wholesale and retail trade, repair of motor vehicles and motorcycles	217
Transportation and storage	31
Accommodation and food services	55
Information and communication	9
Financial and insurance activities	17
Real estate activities	-
Professional, scientific and technical activities	20
Administrative and support service activities	4
Public administration and defense; compulsory social security	170
Education	133
Human health and social work activities	107
Arts, entertainment and recreation	10
Other service activities	32
Total	1,340

== Notable people ==
- Lazar Jovanović, 19th-century manuscript writer
- Derviš Sušić, writer
- Flory Jagoda, musician
- Vedad Ibišević, footballer
- Fahrudin Kuduzović, footballer

== See also ==
- Municipalities of Republika Srpska
- Rašića Gaj massacres
