= Rekavice =

Rekavice Рекавице (Serbian)
- Village (Selo)
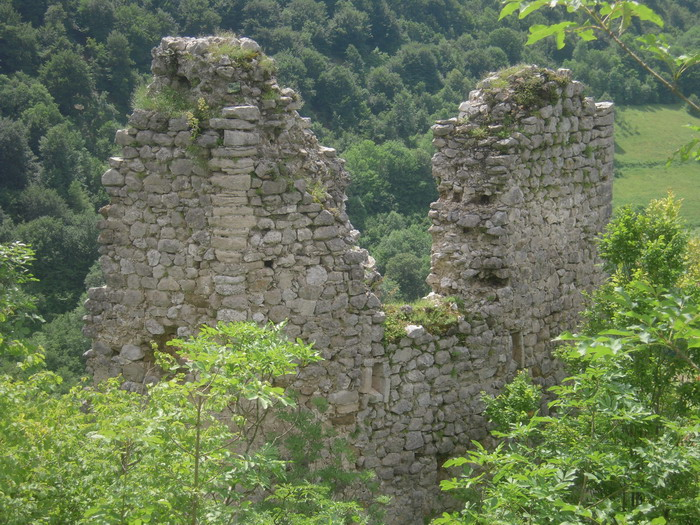
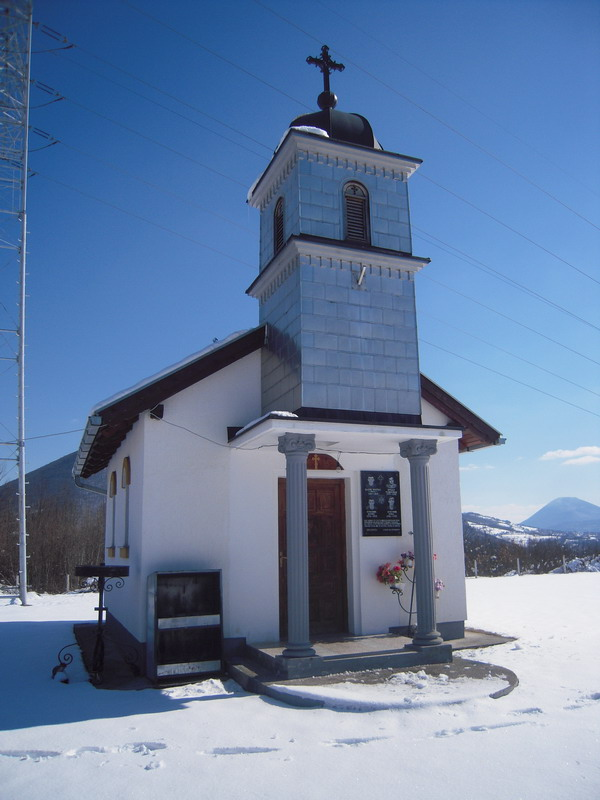
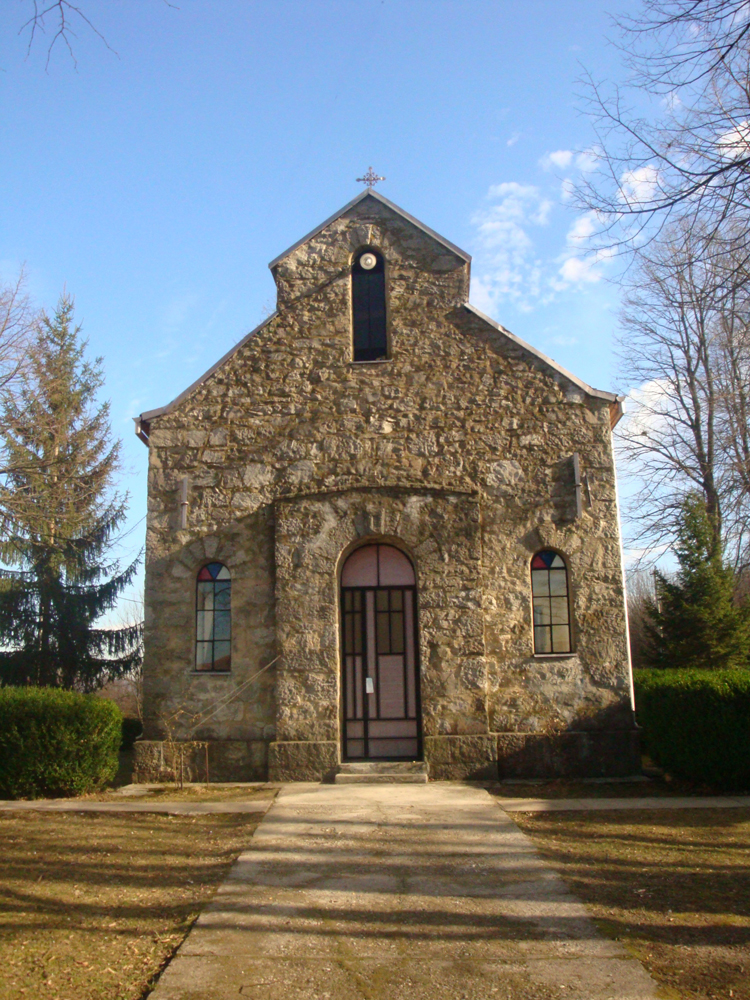

- Location within Bosnia and Herzegovina
- Coordinates: 44°41′N 17°08′E
- Country: Bosnia and Herzegovina
- Entity: Republika Srpska
- Municipality: Banja Luka

Population (2013)
  - Total: 2,268
- Time zone: UTC+1 (CET)
  - Summer (DST): UTC+2 (CEST)

Rekavice (Serbian Cyrillic: Рекавице) is a village in the municipality of Banja Luka, Republika Srpska, Bosnia and Herzegovina. Near the village, on the southern side of the steep slope of the Vrbas canyon are remaints of strategically situated medieval castle of Zvečaj.

== Notable residents ==
- Rada Vranješević
