= History of the Bosniaks =

Bosniaks are a South Slavic ethnic group, native to the region of Bosnia of which the majority are Muslims. The term Bosniaks was used to describe everyone in that region regardless of their religion until late 1800s. It was established again after decades of suppression in the Socialist Federal Republic of Yugoslavia. The Bosniak Assembly adopted the ethnonym to replace "Bosnian Muslims." Scholars believe that the move was partly motivated by a desire to distinguish the Bosniaks from the term Muslim to describe their nationality in the former Yugoslavia. These scholars contend that the Bosniaks are distinguishable from comparable groups (such as the Croats and the Serbs) due to a collective identity based on a shared environment, cultural practices and experiences.

== Medieval Bosnia ==
The Slavs settled in Bosnia, Herzegovina and the surrounding lands, which were part of the Eastern Roman Empire, in the seventh century. The Slavic Serbs and Croats settled some time after the first Slavic wave, and the Croats established a kingdom in north-western Croatia. The Serbs settled in present-day south-central Serbia before expanding into the upper Drina valley of eastern Bosnia and East Herzegovina, known in the Late Middle Ages as Zachlumia (Zahumlje). The Croats in the west were influenced by the Germanic Carolingian Empire and the Roman Catholic Church. Croatia was closely tied to Hungary and, later, Austria until the twentieth century. The Serbs in the east, under periodic Byzantine rule, converted to Eastern Orthodox Christianity and absorbed Byzantine culture. After centuries of rule by Croatia, Serb principalities and the Byzantine Empire, a Bosnian kingdom flourished in central Bosnia between the 12th and the 15th centuries.

Ethnicity in medieval Bosnia has been debated since the second half of the 19th century. All three Bosnian ethnic groups differ, their viewpoints influenced by nationalism. Noel Malcolm, chair of the board of trustees at the Bosnian Institute, wrote in Bosnia: A Short History:

As for the question of whether the inhabitants of Bosnia were really Croat or really Serb in 1180, it cannot be answered, for two reasons: first, because we lack evidence, and secondly because the question lacks meaning. We can say that the majority of the Bosnian territory was probably occupied by Croats - or at least, by Slavs under Croat rule - in the seventh century; but that is a tribal label which has little or no meaning five centuries later. The Bosnians were generally closer to the Croats in their religious and political history; but to apply the modern notion of Croat identity (something constructed in recent centuries out of religion, history, and language) to anyone in this period would be an anachronism. All that one can sensibly say about the ethnic identity of the Bosnians is this: they were the Slavs who lived in Bosnia.

The Kingdom of Bosnia blended Eastern and Western cultural influences. Nominally Roman Catholic, the Bosnian kings embraced elements of Byzantine culture and formed alliances with the neighboring rulers of Croatian-Dalmatian and Serb states. Due to Bosnia's mountainous terrain and its location on the border of Catholicism and Eastern Orthodoxy, control by church authorities was weak. Members of the indigenous Bosnian Church, known as krstjani ("Christians"), were considered heretics by the Roman Catholic and Eastern Orthodox Church.

At its greatest extent, under King Tvrtko I, the Bosnian kingdom included most of present-day Bosnia and Herzegovina (except north-western Bosnia) and parts of Dalmatia and western Serbia and Montenegro. Discord among his heirs weakened the kingdom after his death, and Bosnia and the Serb principalities in the east were unable to prevent Ottoman Turkish incursions into the western Balkans. The final Turkish conquest, in 1463, marked the end of an independent Bosnia and the beginning of a civilization based on Islam.

== Ottoman rule ==
Historians have debated how, and why, many ethnic Bosnians converted to Islam. After their conquest of Bosnia, the Ottoman Empire tried to convert their Christian and pagan subjects to Islam. The gradual conversion of many medieval Bosnians to Islam proceeded at different rates, depending on area and group. Conversion was more rapid in urban areas, centers of learning and of the Ottoman administration, than in the countryside. Merchants found it advantageous to convert to Islam because they gained greater freedom of movement and state protection of their goods. Many converted, and were trained as soldiers.

Forced conversion of children was known as devshirme; a notable example is the Bosnian Serb soldier Mehmet Pasa Sokolovic. The Ottoman Empire was focused on militaristic expansion, based on religion, and the maintenance of power. By this time, Muslims were already a large majority of Bosnia's population.

The Ottoman conquest of Bosnia was notable because, unlike other European regions which came under Ottoman control, Bosnia retained its status as a distinct entity – first as a sanjak, then as an eyalet. The Ottomans imported their feudal system into Bosnia shortly after their takeover, and estates were granted to sipahi in return for military service. At the beginning of the Ottoman period, These estates were usually granted to Muslims early in the Ottoman era, and exclusively to Muslims later on. These land grants gradually became hereditary; most Bosnian landowners were Muslims by the end of the Ottoman period, and most Christians were peasants or serfs.

The main reason for the spread of Islam in the region was probably the weak presence of the Bosnian Church at the time. The old rivalry between the Catholic and Bosnian churches (and with the Orthodox Church in some areas) contributed to the disorganized religious structure in much of the region. To many Bosnians, religion was a combination of tradition and superstition. Their neighbors had well-funded, organized religious institutions, and it was relatively easy for Bosnians to convert from their Christianity to Islam. The only other European region under Ottoman control in which a large segment of the population adopted Islam was Albania, also home to competing Christian sects. Taxes on Muslims (and Orthodox Vlachs) were lower than on other rayah, although a hatt-i humayun attempted to eliminate this inequality.

Urban centers grew, the vast majority of which were Muslim. Cities founded at the time, such as Sarajevo and Mostar, had an Islamic character and advanced living standards. Slaves who converted to Islam could petition for their freedom, and many Christians enslaved during the wars with Habsburg Austria, Hungary, and the Republic of Venice converted to Islam to secure their release. Many of these newly-freed converts settled in the growing cities, contributing to their development.

The primary discrimination faced by non-Muslims was legal, since Christians and Jews were not allowed to file lawsuits or testify against Muslims in court. Although Christian and Jewish subjects of the sultan paid a poll tax (from which Muslims were exempt), Muslims paid the religious zakat; Catholics donated to the church on a voluntary basis. Under devshirme, boys were gathered from Ottoman lands and sent to Istanbul to convert to Islam and be trained as janissaries.

The 17th century brought military defeats on the Ottoman Empire's western frontier. With major wars occurring every few decades, Bosnia was economically and militarily exhausted. The most critical conflict was the Great Turkish War. At its start in the mid-1680s, the Habsburgs conquered nearly all of Ottoman Hungary and sent tens of thousands of Muslim refugees into Bosnia. A similar influx occurred with the Habsburg conquest of Lika and Slavonia. Thousands of Muslims fled eastward into Bosnia, and those who remained were forcibly converted to Catholicism. An estimated 100,000 or more Muslims were expelled from the frontier regions and settled in Bosnia during this time; many brought hostility towards Christianity.

Ottoman military disasters continued into the next decade. In 1697, Habsburg Prince Eugene of Savoy conducted a border raid which resulted in the burning of Sarajevo. The war was finally ended by the Treaty of Karlowitz in 1699. However, during the late 1710s another war between the Ottomans and the Habsburg-Venetian alliance followed. It was ended by the Treaty of Passarowitz in 1718, after another wave of Muslim refugees fled to Bosnia.

The wars and an increased tax burden created unrest among the Bosniaks, and revolts sprang up in Herzegovina in 1727, 1728, 1729, and 1732. In 1736, the Habsburgs broke the Treaty of Passarowitz and crossed the Sava River. The local Bosniak nobility organized a defence and counterattack independent of the ineffective imperial authorities. On August 4, at the Battle of Banja Luka, the outnumbered Bosniak forces routed the Habsburg army and sent them back to Slavonia. The Great Plague of 1738, however (which killed tens of thousands), contributed to the chaos.

Ottoman authorities traditionally classified subjects of the empire not by nationality, but by religion. During the nineteenth century, a national consciousness began to increase among the South Slavs; according to some historians, Catholic Bosnians increasingly began to think of themselves as Croats and Orthodox Bosnians as Serbs. A Bosnian Muslim national consciousness was first attested in the late nineteenth and early twentieth centuries, with early Bosniak nationalists beginning to assert a national identity distinct from their Orthodox and Catholic neighbors and the other Muslim inhabitants of the empire.

== Nationalism ==
In 1862 Muslims, including Bosniaks, were expelled from Serbia. Bosnia and Herzegovina were occupied and administered by the Habsburg Empire in 1878, and a number of Bosniaks left the region. According to Habsburg records, 56,000 people (mostly Bosniaks) emigrated between 1883 and 1920; the number of Bosniak emigrants is probably larger, since the official record does not reflect emigration before 1883 or include those who left without permits. Most of the emigrants probably fled in fear of retribution after the inter-communal violence of the 1875–1878 uprising. Many Serbs from Herzegovina left for the United States during that period. One geographer estimates that there are 350,000 Bosniaks in Turkey, although that figure includes the descendants of Muslim South Slavs who emigrated from the Sandžak region during (and after) the First Balkan War. Another wave of Bosniak emigration occurred after the end of the First World War, when Bosnia and Herzegovina became part of the Kingdom of Yugoslavia.

Urban Bosniaks were particularly proud of their cosmopolitan culture, especially in the Bosnian capital Sarajevo; until World War II, it was home to thriving Bosniak, Serb, Croat, and Jewish communities. After 1945, Sarajevo was one of the most ethnically-mixed cities in the former Yugoslavia.

With the birth of the Illyrian movement, Bosniak intelligentsia gathered around the magazine Bosnia in the 1860s (which promoted the idea of a Bosniak nation); the father of Bosnian poet Safvet-beg Bašagić was a member of this group. The Bosniak group remained active for several decades, with a continuity of ideas and the use of the archaic Bosniak name. From 1891 to 1910, they published the magazine Bosniak. By the beginning of the 20th century, however, the group had nearly died out; its most prominent members died or embraced Croat identity.

The administration of Benjamin Kallay, the Habsburg governor of Bosnia and Herzegovina, enforced the idea of a Bosnian nation (Bosanci) which would include Catholics, Orthodox and Muslims. The idea was fiercely opposed by Croats, Serbs, and a number of Muslims.

The Muslim National Organization (MNO), a political party founded in 1906, was opposed to the regime and promoted Muslims as separate from Serbs and Croats. Although a group of Croat Muslim dissidents formed the Muslim Progressive Party (MNS), it received little popular support and soon faded.

The first constitution of Bosnia and Herzegovina, in 1910, cited Serbs, Croats and Muslims as "native peoples". In elections held soon afterwards, the MNO, the Serb National Organization (SNO) and the Croat National Community (HNZ) received almost unanimous support in separate ballots; their members formed a parliament, although it had little power in the Habsburg province of Bosnia and Herzegovina.

== 20th century ==
After World War I, Bosnia and Herzegovina became part of the Kingdom of Yugoslavia. The Serb monarchy, one of the victors of the war, sought a Croat-Slovene coalition. The MNO, reformed as the Yugoslav Muslim Organization (JMO), dropped the pursuit of Muslim national identity and focused on protecting Muslim interests through alliances with other parties – sometimes with Serbian parties, such as Nikola Pašić's People's Radical Party and Milan Stojadinović's Serbian Radical Party.

Only Serbs, Croats and Slovenes were recognized as ethnic groups in the 1921 census, and many Bosniaks left the ethnicity field blank. This phenomenon was a topic of debate amongst scholars and politicians for years, with some saying that those who did not declare their ethnicity were descendants of Turks and should be expelled. Thanks to JMO influence, however, incidents of oppression against Bosniaks were isolated.

A number of opposition parties then recognized Muslims as a separate nation; according to a 1930s document, among them was the Communist Party of Yugoslavia. Many Bosnian Muslims joined the party and became partisans, a number of whom became commanders and political leaders.

During World War II, authorities in the Nazi-puppet Independent State of Croatia tried to ally with the Bosniaks (whom they considered Muslim Croats) against the Serbs. The Arts Hall in Zagreb, designed by Ivan Meštrović, was converted into a mosque.

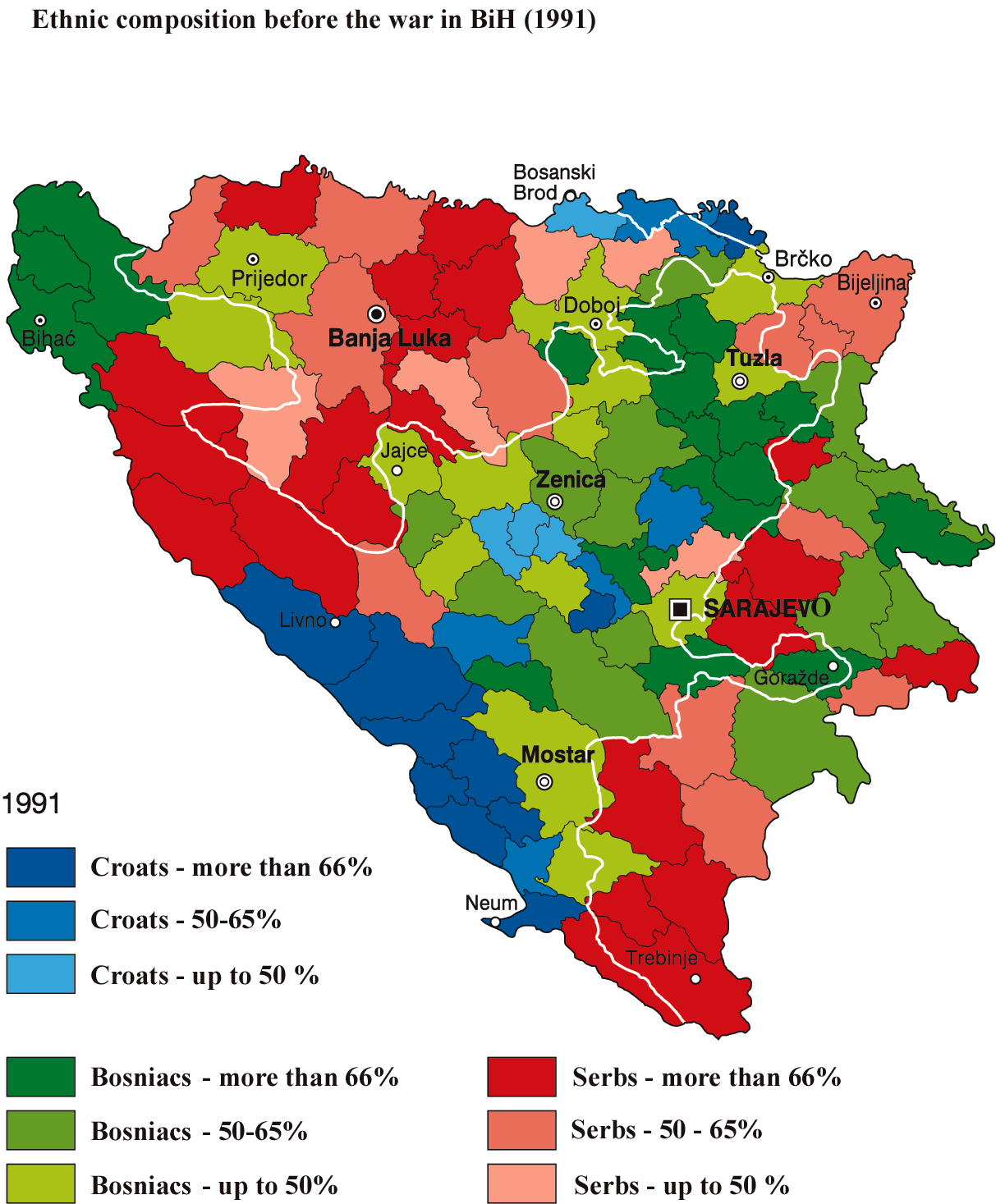
Bosniaks in Bosnia and Herzegovina in 1991, before the Bosnian War

The Declaration of the State Anti-Fascist Council of National Liberation of Bosnia and Herzegovina (ZAVNOBiH), with essentially the same wording as the 1910 constitution and issued by the partisan government on 25 November 1943, is considered the constitutional basis of present-day Bosnia and Herzegovina. The declaration was violated as soon as the war ended, since the constitution of the Federal People's Republic of Yugoslavia (later the Socialist Federal Republic of Yugoslavia) cited only Serbs and Croats as native peoples. In the 1948 Yugoslav census, 90 percent of Muslims declared themselves nationality-undetermined; many who registered as Serbs or Croats did so largely out of societal and economic pressure. When the "Yugoslav, nationality undeclared" option became available in 1953, 900,000 people registered as such.

Serb dominance of Bosnian communist leadership weakened, and the opportunity arose for a new national identity. In the 1961 Yugoslav census, the ethnic-Muslim option first appeared; by 1963, Muslims were listed with Serbs and Croats in the Bosnian constitution. In 1968, "Muslim" denoted ethnic (rather than religious) identity. Although the decision was debated by communist officials, Bosniak national identity continued to develop until the Yugoslav Wars. There were two approaches: Muslim nationalism (supported by Hamdija Pozderac) and an Islamic religious revival supported by Alija Izetbegović. The effects of both concepts of what constitutes a Bosnian Muslim (which have occasionally clashed) can be seen to the present day.

In September 1993, the Congress of Bosniak Intellectuals (Bosnian: Drugi bošnjački sabor) re-introduced the historical ethnic name Bosniaks. Although Serbs and Croats objected to the name as a ploy to depict them as Bosnian foreigners, the archaic term means "Bosnians" and was once used for all inhabitants of Bosnia (regardless of religion). According to Bosniaks, Bosniak is the historical term for their nation; if they wanted to monopolize Bosnian history, they could have used the term Bosanci. The name has been used outside Bosnia since the 1990s for the Slavic Muslim populations of other former Yugoslav republics, such as Serbia and North Macedonia; it makes a Bosniak-Bosnian distinction which matches the Serb-Serbian and Croat-Croatian distinctions between ethnicity and residence.

== See also ==
- History of Bosnia and Herzegovina
