= Tuhaglia =

Medieval fortress

- Tarčin, Bosnia and Herzegovina

Location
- Location within Bosnia and Herzegovina
- Coordinates: 43°49′00″N 18°04′40″E

Site history
- Built: c. 14th century

Tuhaglia (Tuhelj, Tuchegl) is a medieval fortress in the area of the parish of Lepenica. At the end of the 19th century, the fortress was called Tuheljgrad.

The remains of the fort are on a steep hill above the Bijela (White) River, three kilometers north of Tarčin. Otherwise, the entire canyon of the Bijela River, from Tarčin to it confluence with the Crna (Black) River and formation of Lepenica River, is called Tuhelja.

== History ==
The Tuhelj Fortress gravitated to the area around today's Tarčin. Hence, it is assumed that the settlement of Smucka near Tarčin was actually a suburb of Tuhelj. It is mentioned in 1428 as "Smuçicha". The necropolis of stećak tombstones at the Borak site also speaks of a medieval settlement near Tarčin.
