= Vranduk Fortress =

Fortress in Bosnia and Herzegovina

Vranduk
- Vranduk; Bosnia and Herzegovina
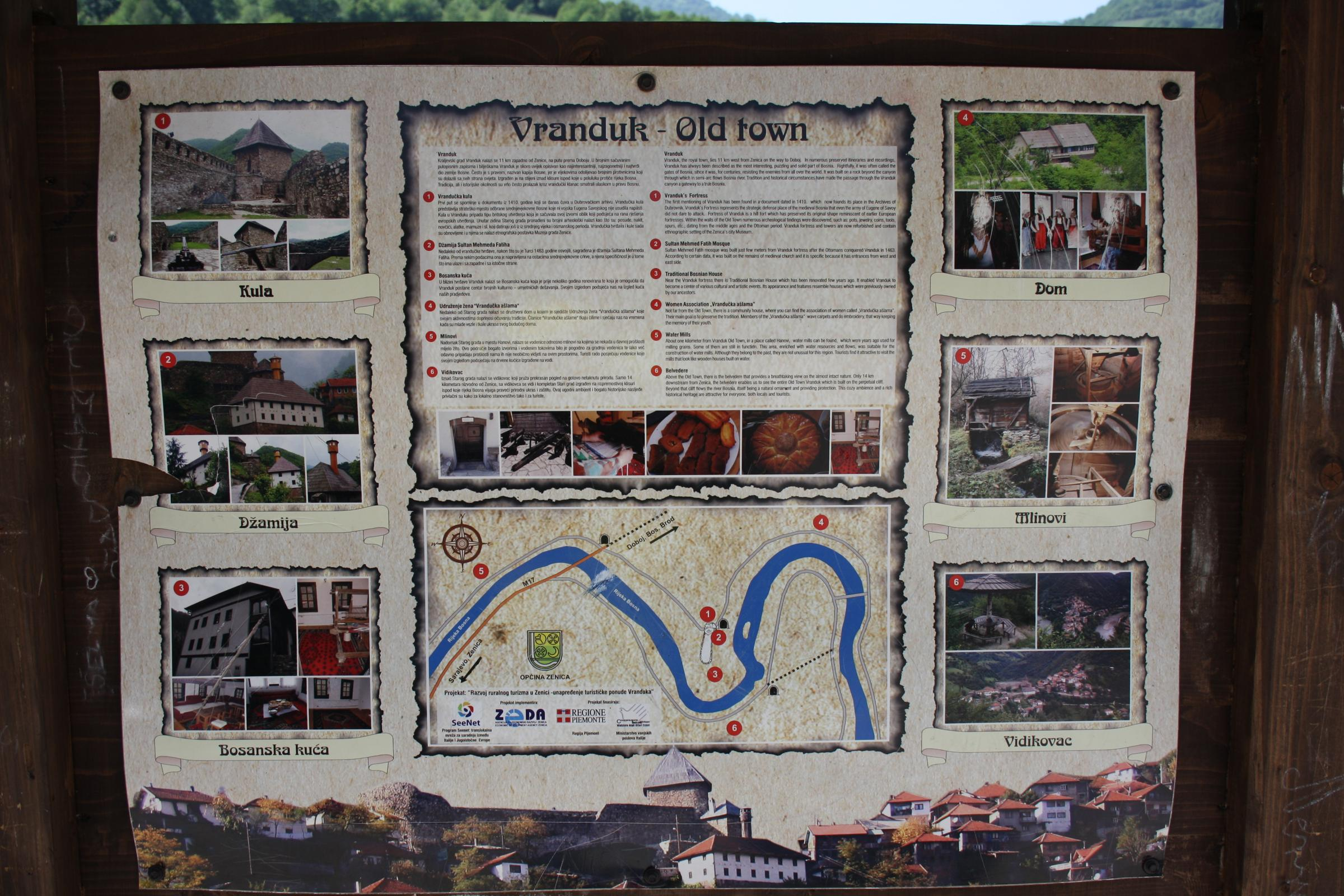
- Vranduk, map and info table

Site information
- Type: town-fortress
- Owner: The Government of Bosnia and Herzegovina
- Condition: good
- Website: Vranduk - zemuzej.ba

Location
- Vranduk
- Coordinates: 44.291957°N 17.904017°E

Site history
- Built: between 12th century and 14th century
- Built by: (unknown)
- In use: Until 1918
- Materials: dry stone walling

Garrison information
- Designations

KONS of Bosnia and Herzegovina
- Official name: "Old Vranduk Fort, the architectural complex (2528)".
- Type: Category II monument
- Criteria: A, B, C iv.vi., D i.ii.iv, E ii.iii.v., F ii., G i.ii.iii.v.vi., H i.
- Designated: 25 January 2005 (?th session)
- Reference no.: 2528
- Decision no.: . 05.2-2-165/05-4

Vranduk is a medieval fortress and a historic village in the municipality of Zenica, Bosnia and Herzegovina and the National Monument of Bosnia and Herzegovina.

== Location ==
It is situated on the Bosna River canyon, just downstream from city of Zenica, at the site called the Vranduk Pass. The main road Sarajevo-Zenica-Doboj (M17) passes through the canyon and the village.

== History ==
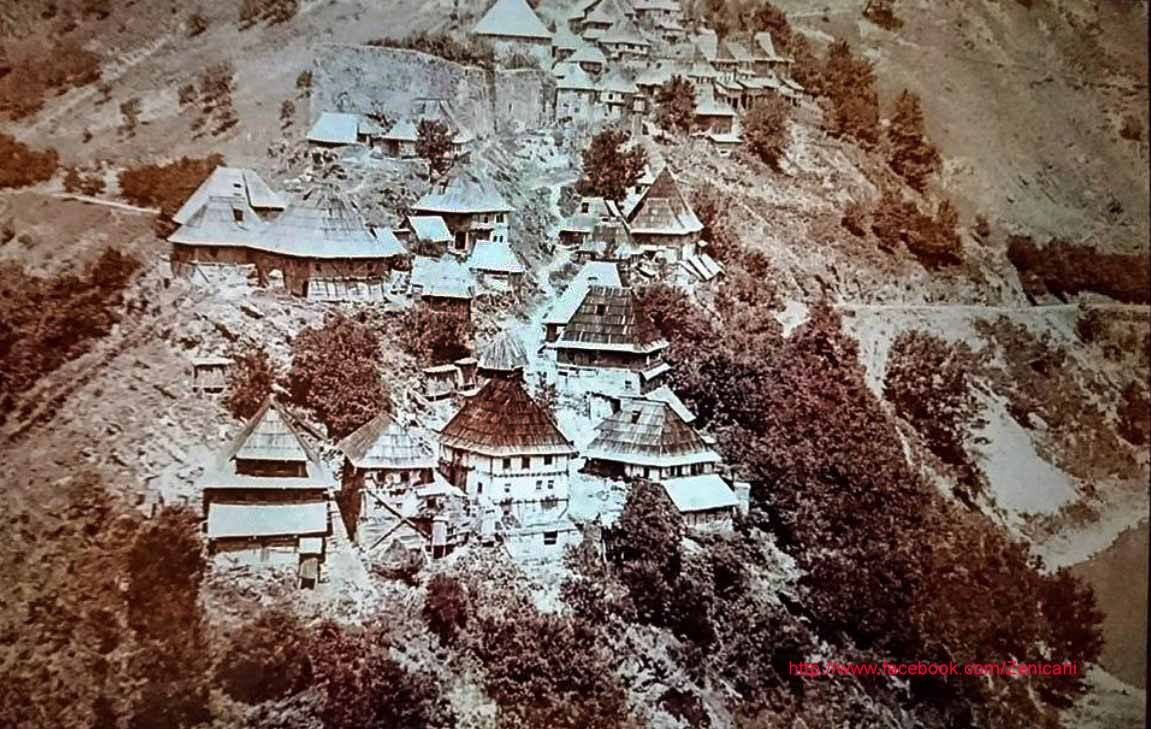
Vranduk with its medieval citadel, as photographed 1895

Archaeological excavations to date on the site of the fort showed no signs of fortifications dating from the prehistoric period or antiquity, or prior to the medieval times. The village itself is one of the oldest and well preserved settlements of Bosnia and Herzegovina, dating back to the 14th century and times of medieval bans and later kings of Bosnia. Vranduk village was established around a medieval citadel of the same name, and together constitute a protected architectural assembly, and as such it is a national monument of Bosnia and Herzegovina, well preserved and maintained in good condition by local and state commissions for national monuments, and managed by a local tourist organization. A small mosque was erected below the citadel after the Ottoman conquest of the Bosnian Kingdom which still is standing today in good condition. The mosque was dedicated to and named after Sultan Mehmed II, conqueror of Bosnia, and is also referred to as the Imperial Mosque or Emperor's Mosque. In 1963, excavations were undertaken by Branka Raunig to explore the impact of the Roman empire on the village.

== Heritage designation ==
On 25 January 2005, the Vranduk fortress and surrounding area are designated a National Monument of Bosnia and Herzegovina by KONS.

== Gallery ==
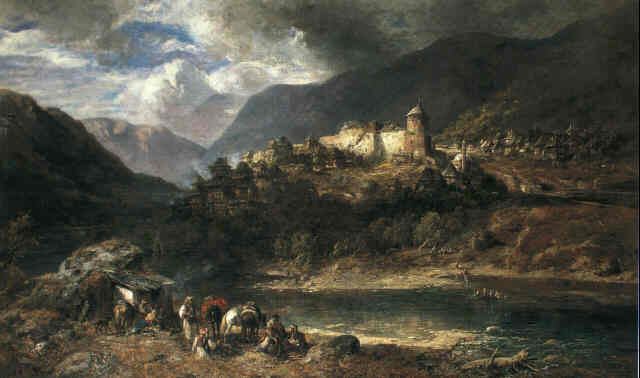
Vranduk, oil painting

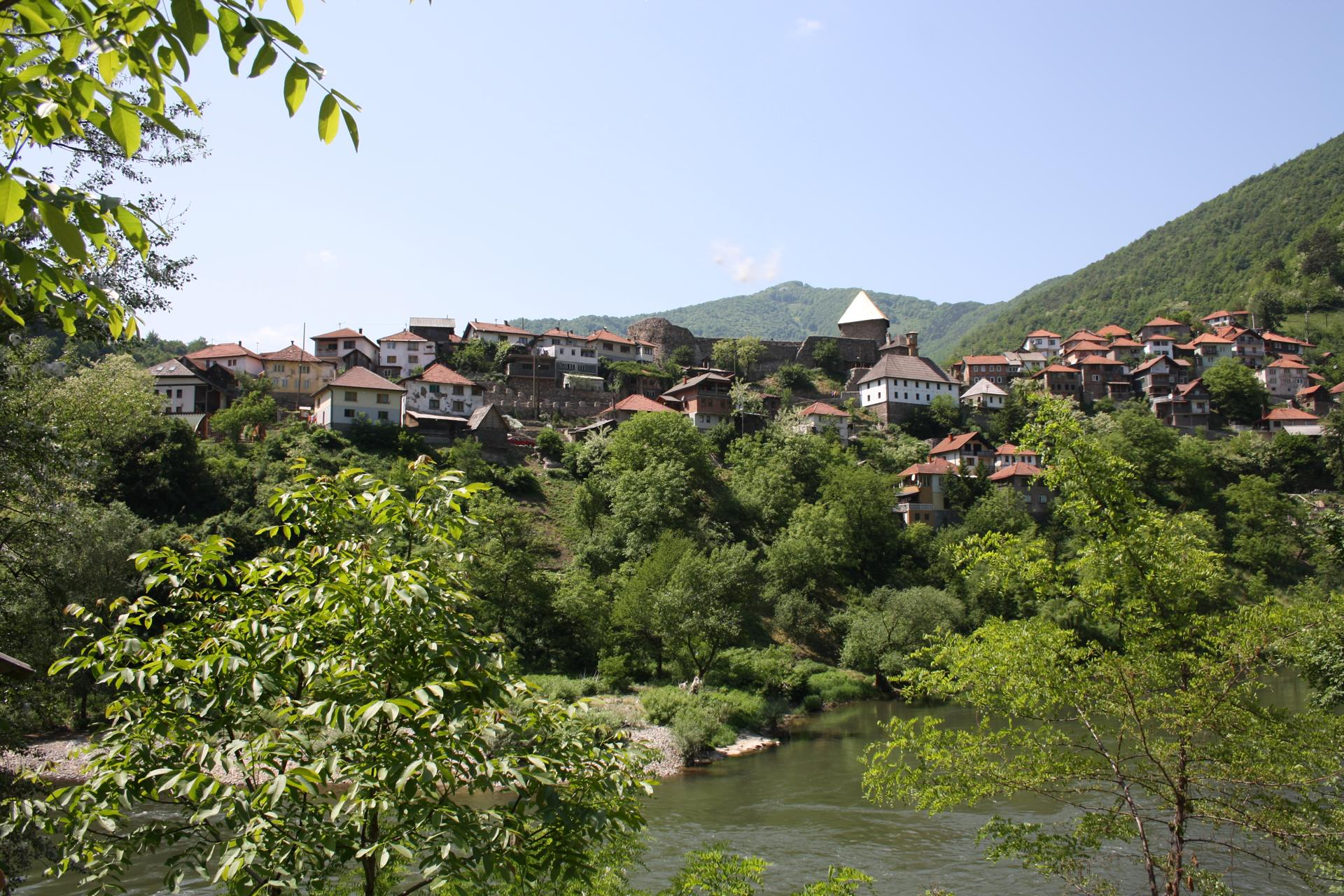
Vranduk from the Bosna river

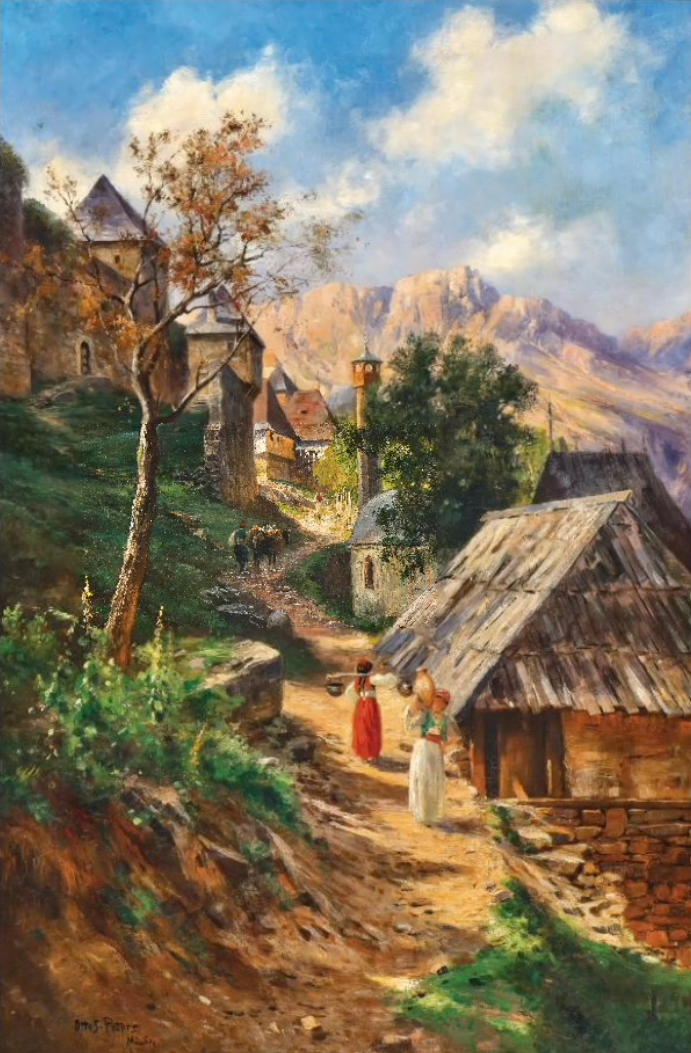
Vranduk Castle and the Sultan Mehmed II Fatih Mosque of 1463, oil painting by Otto Seraphim Peters (around 1885)

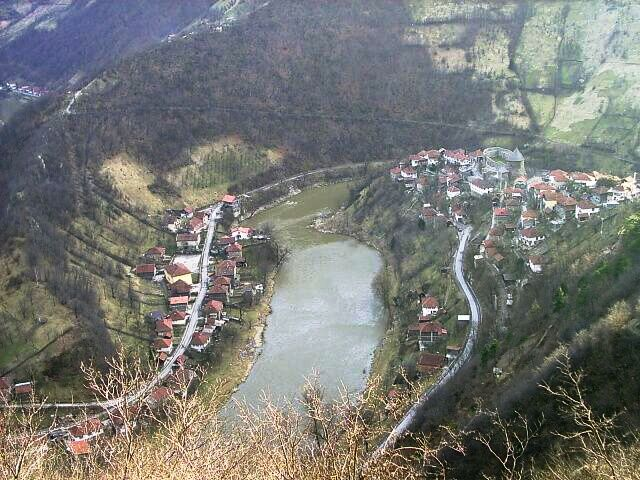
Vranduk, birdsview on the Vranduk Pass

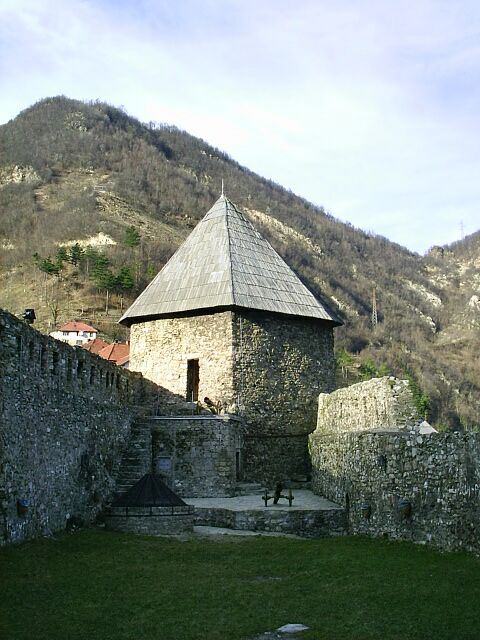
Vranduk, citadel

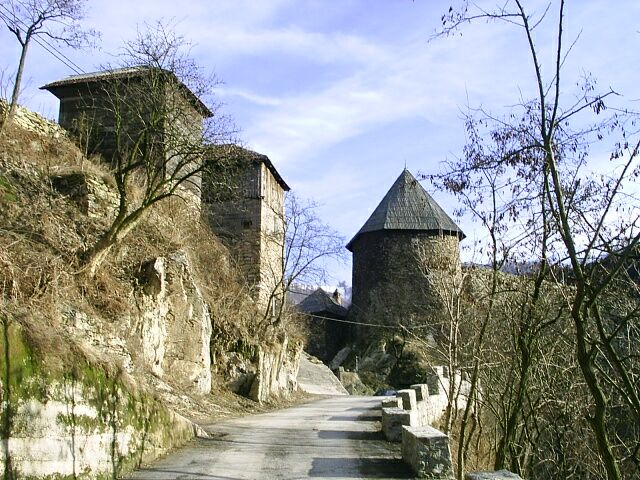
Vranduk, approach to citadel

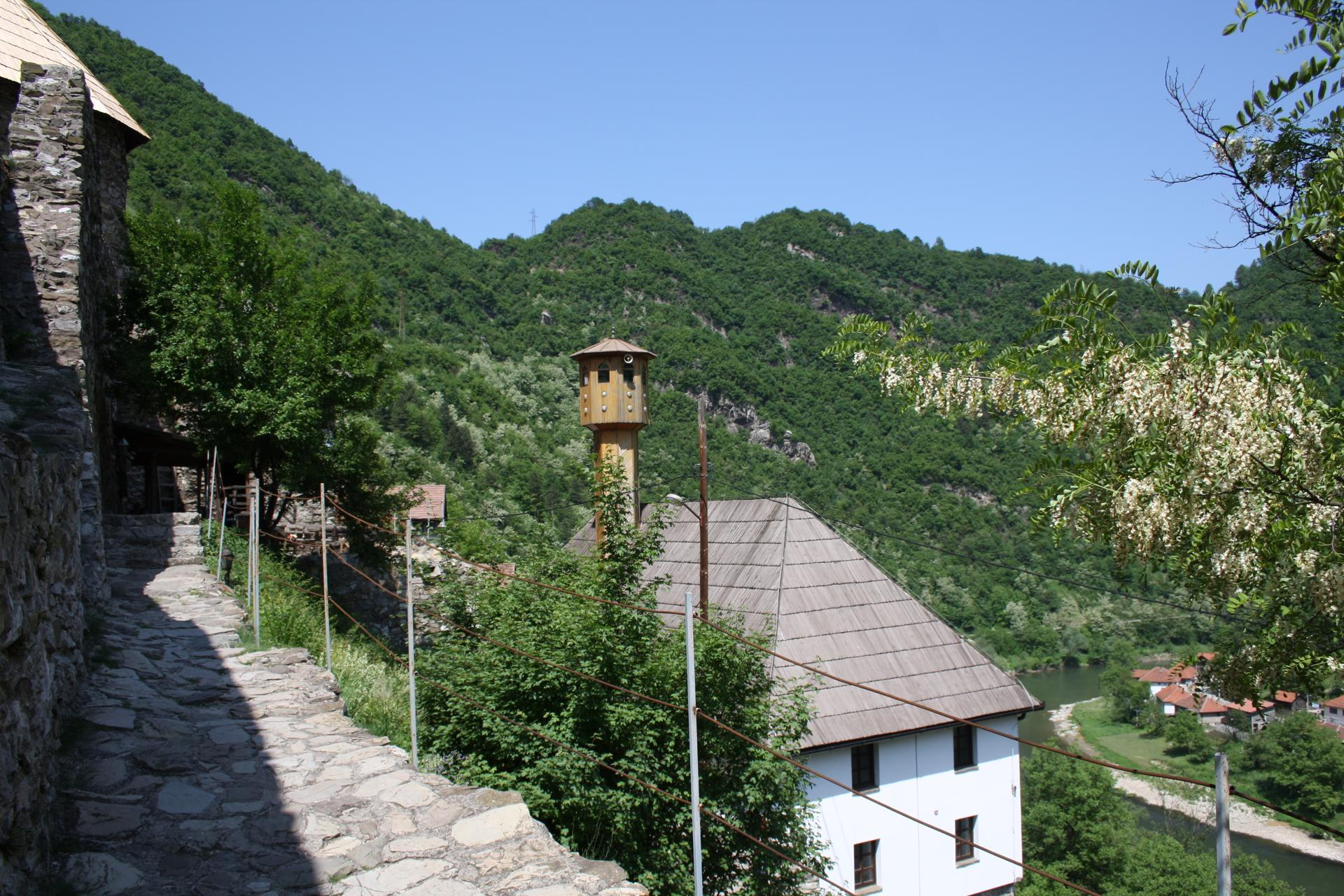
Vranduk, small mosque below citadel, dedicated to Sultan Mehmed II El Fatih also referred to as the Imperial or Emperor's mosque

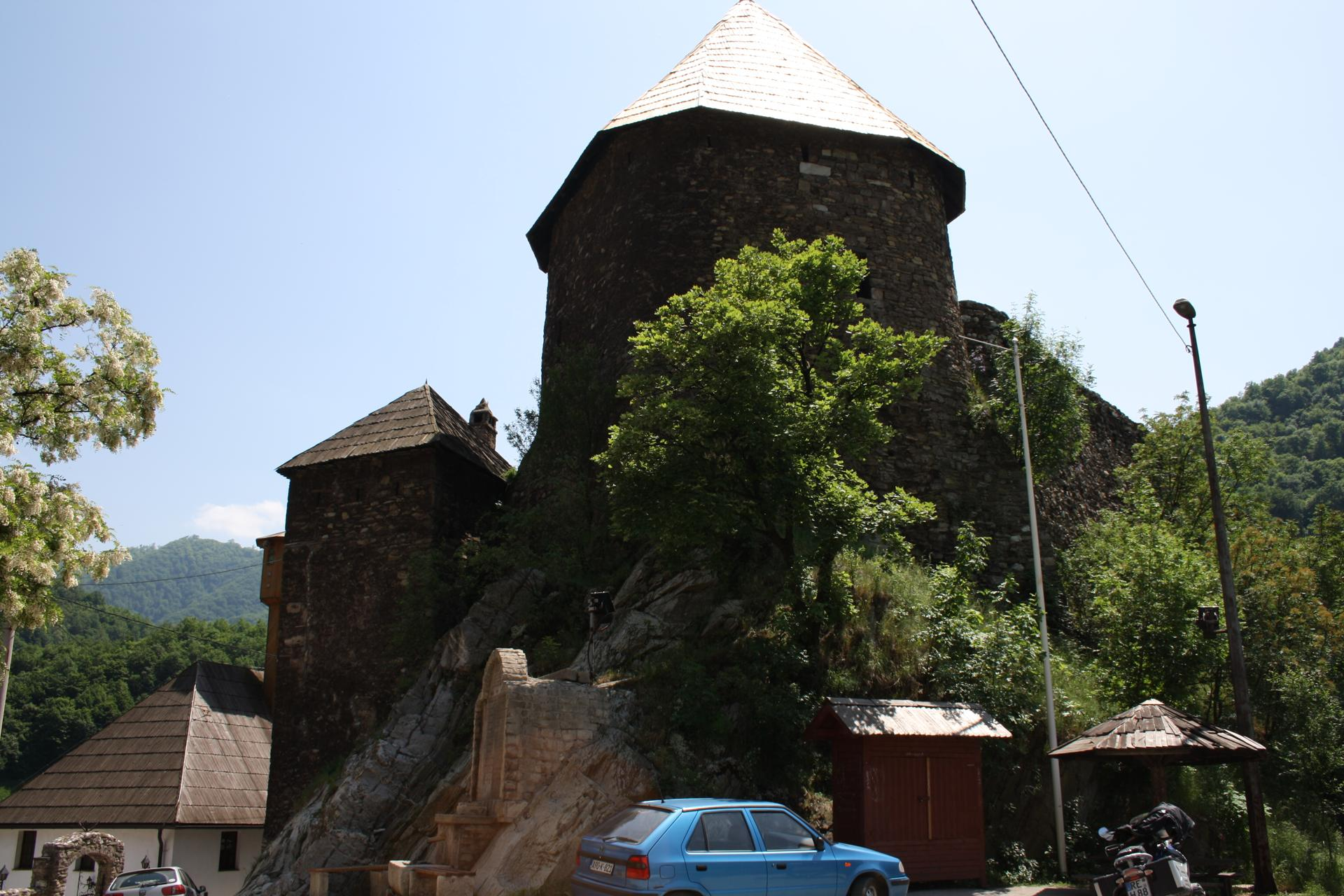
Vranduk, village center below citadel

== Sources ==
- "Old Vranduk Fort, the architectural complex". aplikacija.kons.gov.ba (in Serbo-Croatian and English). Commission to preserve national monuments. 25 January 2005.
