= Ludmer =

Coordinates: 44.1667°N 19.1833°E

Ludmer (Serbian Cyrillic: Лудмер) is a historical and mountainous region around Bratunac, in eastern Bosnia and Herzegovina, part of the wider Birač and Podrinje regions. It borders the Osat region. The region is inhabited by ethnic Serbs and Bosniaks.

It was a nahiya during the Ottoman period.

== Sources ==
- Зборник за историју Босне и Херцеговине. Академија. 2002.
- др Слободан Зечевић. Гласник Етнографског музеја у Београду књ. 33: Bulletin du Musée Ethnographique de Belgrade. Etnografski muzej u Beogradu. pp. 64–. GGKEY:PXCNL8YTPDP.
- Митар Влаховић. Гласник Етнографског музеја у Београду књ.17. Etnografski muzej u Beogradu. pp. 22–. GGKEY:RCCQFJ366QF.
