= Milići, Republika Srpska =

Town and municipality in Bosnia and Herzegovina

Milići Милићи
- Town and municipality
- Flag Coat of arms

- Location of Milići within Bosnia and Herzegovina

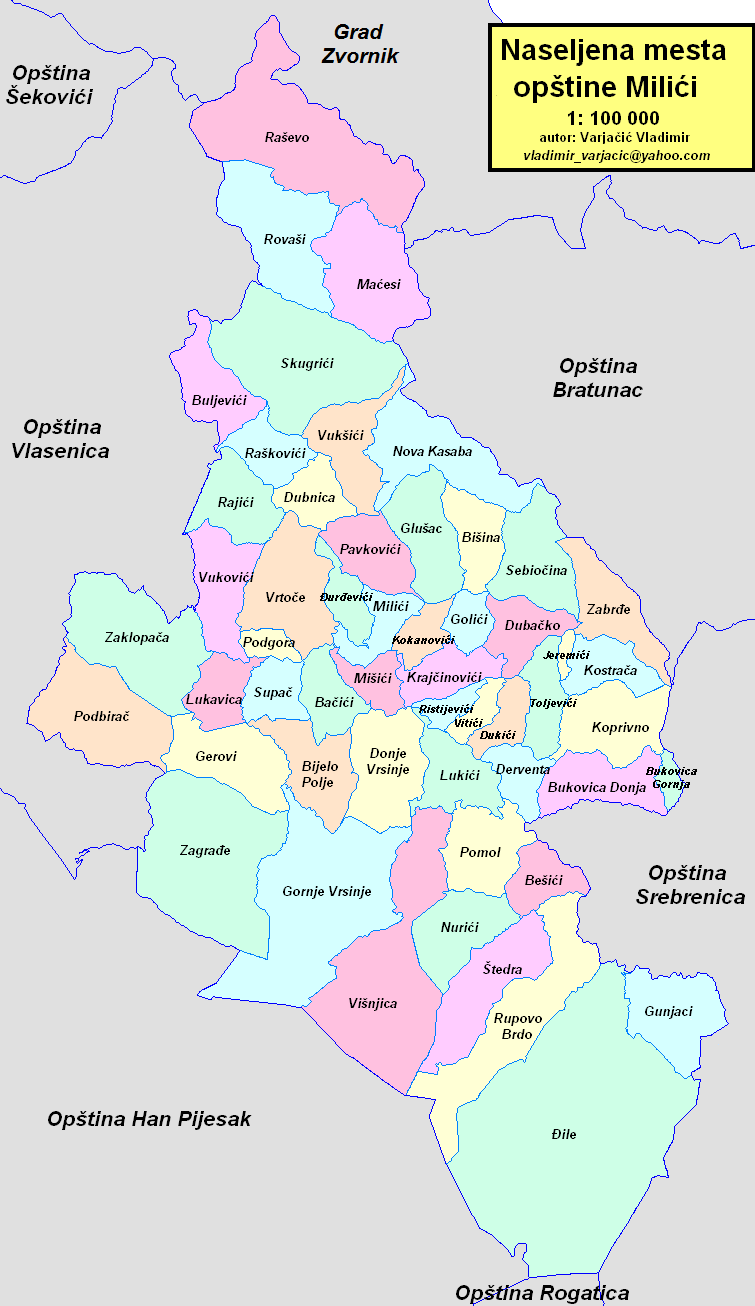
- Coordinates: 44°09′58″N 19°04′30″E
- Country: Bosnia and Herzegovina
- Entity: Republika Srpska
- Geographical region: Podrinje
- Boroughs: 54

Government
  - Municipal mayor: Marko Savić (SNSD)

Area
  - Total: 279.13 km^{2} (107.77 sq mi)

Population (2013 census)
  - Total: 11,441
  - Density: 40.988/km^{2} (106.16/sq mi)
- Time zone: UTC+1 (CET)
  - Summer (DST): UTC+2 (CEST)
- Area code: 56
- Website: www.opstinamilici.org

Milići (Serbian Cyrillic: Милићи) is a town and a municipality located in Bosnia and Herzegovina. As of 2013, it has a population of 11,441 inhabitants, while the town of Milići has a population of 2,368 inhabitants.

== Settlements ==
- Bačići
- Bešići
- Bijelo Polje
- Bišina
- Bukovica Donja
- Bukovica Gornja
- Buljevići
- Derventa
- Donje Vrsinje
- Dubačko
- Dubnica
- Dukići
- Đile
- Đurđevići
- Gerovi
- Glušac
- Golići
- Gornje Vrsinje
- Gunjaci
- Jeremići
- Kokanovići
- Koprivno
- Kostrača
- Krajčinovići
- Lukavica
- Lukići
- Maćesi
- Milići
- Mišići
- Nova Kasaba
- Nurići
- Pavkovići
- Podbirač
- Podgora
- Pomol
- Rajići
- Raševo
- Raškovići
- Ristijevići
- Rovaši
- Rupovo Brdo
- Sebiočina
- Skugrići
- Supač
- Štedra
- Toljevići
- Višnjica
- Vitići
- Vrtoče
- Vukovići
- Vukšići
- Zabrđe
- Milići
- Zaklopača

== Demographics ==
=== Population ===
Population of settlements – Milići municipality
	Settlement	1971.	1981.	1991.	2013.
	Total	12,710	14,117	16,038	11,441
1	Bačići			502	586
2	Bešići			390	208
3	Derventa			324	256
4	Đurđevići			161	234
5	Lukići			224	277
6	Maćesi			687	381
7	Milići	506	1,546	2,414	2,368
8	Mišići			247	329
9	Nova Kasaba			1,042	404
10	Pomol			459	305
11	Raševo			464	248
12	Rovaši			1,236	740
13	Skugrići			1,144	581
14	Vrtoče			579	632
15	Vukovići			219	219
16	Zaklopača			437	235

=== Ethnic composition ===
Ethnic composition – Milići town
	2013.	1991.	1981.	1971.
Total	2,368 (100,0%)	2,414 (100,0%)	1,546 (100,0%)	506 (100,0%)
Serbs		2,229 (92,34%)	1,385 (89,59%)	468 (92,49%)
Bosniaks		107 (4,432%)	43 (2,781%)	7 (1,383%)
Others		47 (1,947%)	1 (0,065%)	3 (0,593%)
Yugoslavs		28 (1,160%)	98 (6,339%)	
Croats		3 (0,124%)	10 (0,647%)	15 (2,964%)
Montenegrins			8 (0,517%)	13 (2,569%)
Hungarians			1 (0,065%)	

Ethnic composition – Milići municipality
	2013.	1991.
Total	11,441 (100,0%)	16,038 (100,0%)
Serbs	7,180 (62,76%)	7,983 (50,79%)
Bosniaks	4,199 (36,70%)	7,433 (47,29%)
Others	38 (0,332%)	228 (1,450%)
Croats	24 (0,210%)	7 (0,045%)
Yugoslavs		68 (0,433%)

== Economy ==
The economy of Milići is dominated by bauxite extraction mining company "Boksit", a multi-faceted company originally established in 1959.

The following table gives a preview of total number of registered people employed in legal entities per their core activity (as of 2018):

Activity	Total
Agriculture, forestry and fishing	59
Mining and quarrying	870
Manufacturing	341
Electricity, gas, steam and air conditioning supply	23
Water supply; sewerage, waste management and remediation activities	30
Construction	14
Wholesale and retail trade, repair of motor vehicles and motorcycles	113
Transportation and storage	73
Accommodation and food services	32
Information and communication	10
Financial and insurance activities	40
Real estate activities	-
Professional, scientific and technical activities	23
Administrative and support service activities	5
Public administration and defense; compulsory social security	115
Education	128
Human health and social work activities	56
Arts, entertainment and recreation	11
Other service activities	14
Total	1,957

== Sports ==
The local football team, FK Boksit Milići, were also established by the company in 1972.

In the 1990s, businessman Rajko Dukić invested in sports development in Milići, and local teams became champions of Republika Srpska in football, chess, bowling and women's handball. He also invested in a large cultural complex occupying the centre of the town, including a museum, motel, pool complex and the 65-metre tall 'Rajko's Tower'.

== See also ==
- Municipalities of Republika Srpska
