= Drinjača =

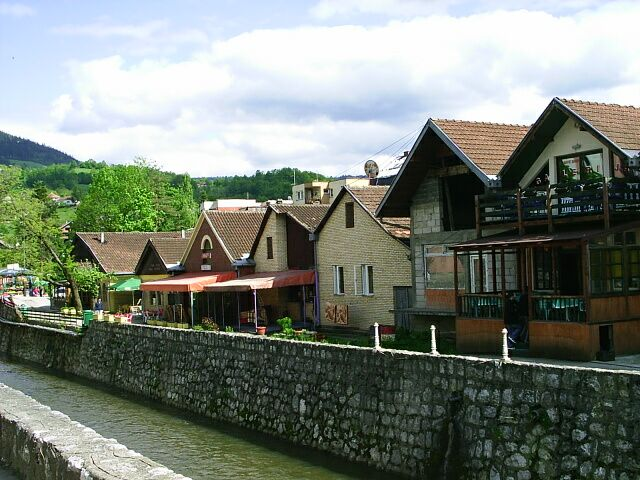

- Location within Bosnia and Herzegovina

Location
- Country: Bosnia and Herzegovina

Physical characteristics
- Source
  - elevation: approx. 1,000 m (3,300 ft)
- Mouth
  - location: Drina
  - coordinates: 44.2867°N 19.1589°E
- Length: 87.5 km (54.4 mi)
- Basin size: 1,091 km^{2} (421 sq mi)

Basin features
- Progression: Drina→ Sava→ Danube→ Black Sea

Drinjača (Serbian Cyrillic: Дрињача) is a left tributary of the Drina in eastern Bosnia and Herzegovina. It rises on the mountain of Konjuh (1,326 m) 15 km northwest of Kladanj at an elevation of about 1,000 m and ends after 87.5 km in the Drina, south of Zvornik. The catchment area covers 1,091 km².

The river Drinjača offers terrains for recreational fishing on salmonids and numerous other fish species, but is primarily an important spawning ground for huchen and nase, both of which enter the river from the Drina river.

== See also ==
- List of rivers of Bosnia and Herzegovina
