= Podglavica =

Podglavica may refer to:

- Podglavica, Glamoč, Bosnia and Herzegovina
- Podglavica, Danilovgrad, Montenegro
- Podglavica, Croatia, a village near Rogoznica
