= List of settlements in the Federation of Bosnia and Herzegovina/Ć =

List of settlements in the Federation of Bosnia and Herzegovina - Ć
Settlement	City or municipality	Canton
Ćavarov Stan	Tomislavgrad	Canton 10
Ćirići	Glamoč	Canton 10
Ćosanlije	Livno	Canton 10
Ćoslije	Glamoč	Canton 10
