= Šumnjaci =

Šumnjaci Шумњаци
- Village
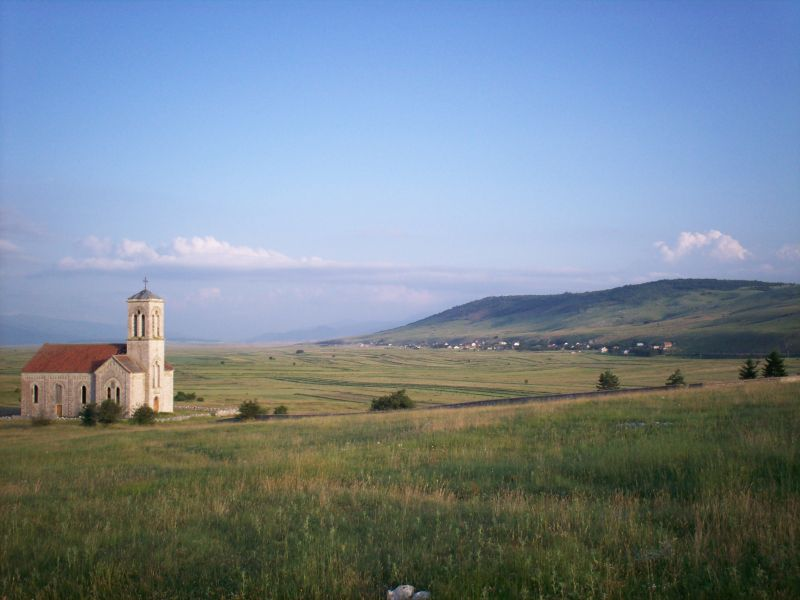
- Panoramic view of Šumnjaci and the village church

- Location within Bosnia and Herzegovina
- Coordinates: 44°09′N 16°47′E
- Country: Bosnia and Herzegovina
- Entity: Federation of Bosnia and Herzegovina
- Canton: Canton 10
- Municipality: Glamoč

Area
  - Total: 11.65 km^{2} (4.50 sq mi)

Population (2013)
  - Total: 61
  - Density: 5.2/km^{2} (14/sq mi)
- Time zone: UTC+1 (CET)
  - Summer (DST): UTC+2 (CEST)

Šumnjaci (Serbian Cyrillic: Шумњаци) is a village in the Municipality of Glamoč in Canton 10 of the Federation of Bosnia and Herzegovina, an entity of Bosnia and Herzegovina.

== Demographics ==
According to the 2013 census, its population was 61.

Ethnicity in 2013
Ethnicity	Number	Percentage
Serbs	60	98.4%
Croats	1	1.6%
Total	61	100%

== Bibliography ==
- Ethnicity/National Affiliation, Religion and Mother Tongue (PDF). Sarajevo: Agency for Statistics of Bosnia and Herzegovina. 2019.
