= Hasanbegovci =

Hasanbegovci Хасанбеговци
- Village
- Location within Bosnia and Herzegovina
- Coordinates: 44°08′N 16°50′E
- Country: Bosnia and Herzegovina
- Entity: Federation of Bosnia and Herzegovina
- Canton: Canton 10
- Municipality: Glamoč

Area
  - Total: 56.05 km^{2} (21.64 sq mi)

Population (2013)
  - Total: 8
  - Density: 0.14/km^{2} (0.37/sq mi)
- Time zone: UTC+1 (CET)
  - Summer (DST): UTC+2 (CEST)

Hasanbegovci (Serbian Cyrillic: Хасанбеговци) is a village in the Municipality of Glamoč in Canton 10 of the Federation of Bosnia and Herzegovina, an entity of Bosnia and Herzegovina.

It lies in a mountainous region, with an elevation ranging from 908 to 936 meters above sea level.

== Demographics ==
According to the 2013 census, its population was 8, all Serbs.

== Bibliography ==
- Ethnicity/National Affiliation, Religion and Mother Tongue (PDF). Sarajevo: Agency for Statistics of Bosnia and Herzegovina. 2019.
