= Glamoč Fortress =

Medieval fortress in Bosnia and Herzegovina

- Glamočka tvrđava Гламочка тврђава
- Glamoč, Bosnia and Herzegovina
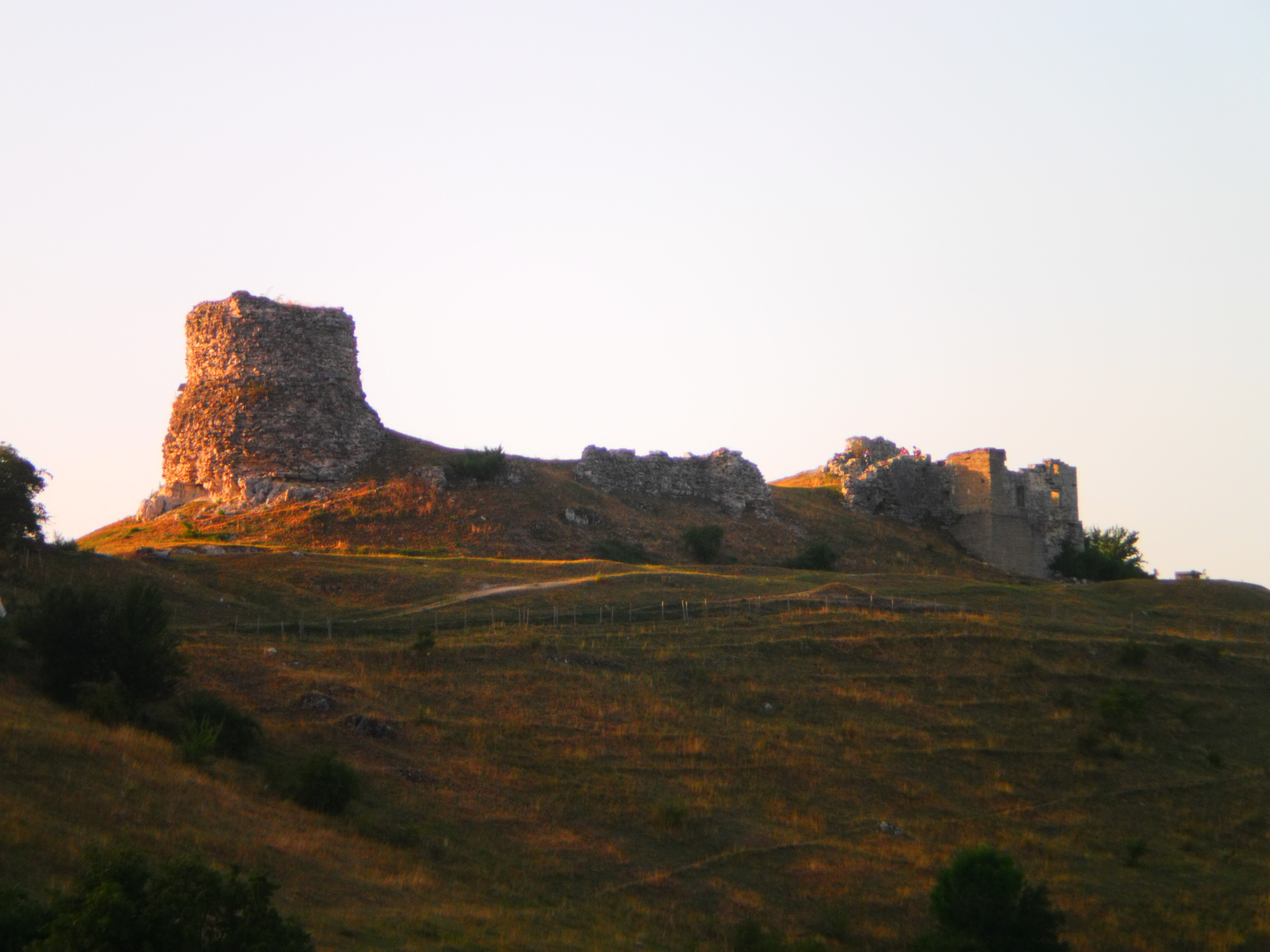

Site information
- Open to the public: Yes
- Condition: Ruined

Location
- Coordinates: 44.041969°N 16.84401°E

Site history
- Built: circa 14th century
- In use: until 1882
- Materials: stone

Garrison information
- Past commanders: Tvrtko I of Bosnia, Grgur Stjepanić, Stephen Ostoja of Bosnia, Pavao Maštrović Klešić

Glamoč fortress (Bosnian, Croatian and Serbian: Glamočka tvrđava / Гламочка тврђава) is a medieval fortress located on the north slopes of Staretina mountain above the town of Glamoč. The construction of the fortress started as early as 14th century.

== Gallery ==
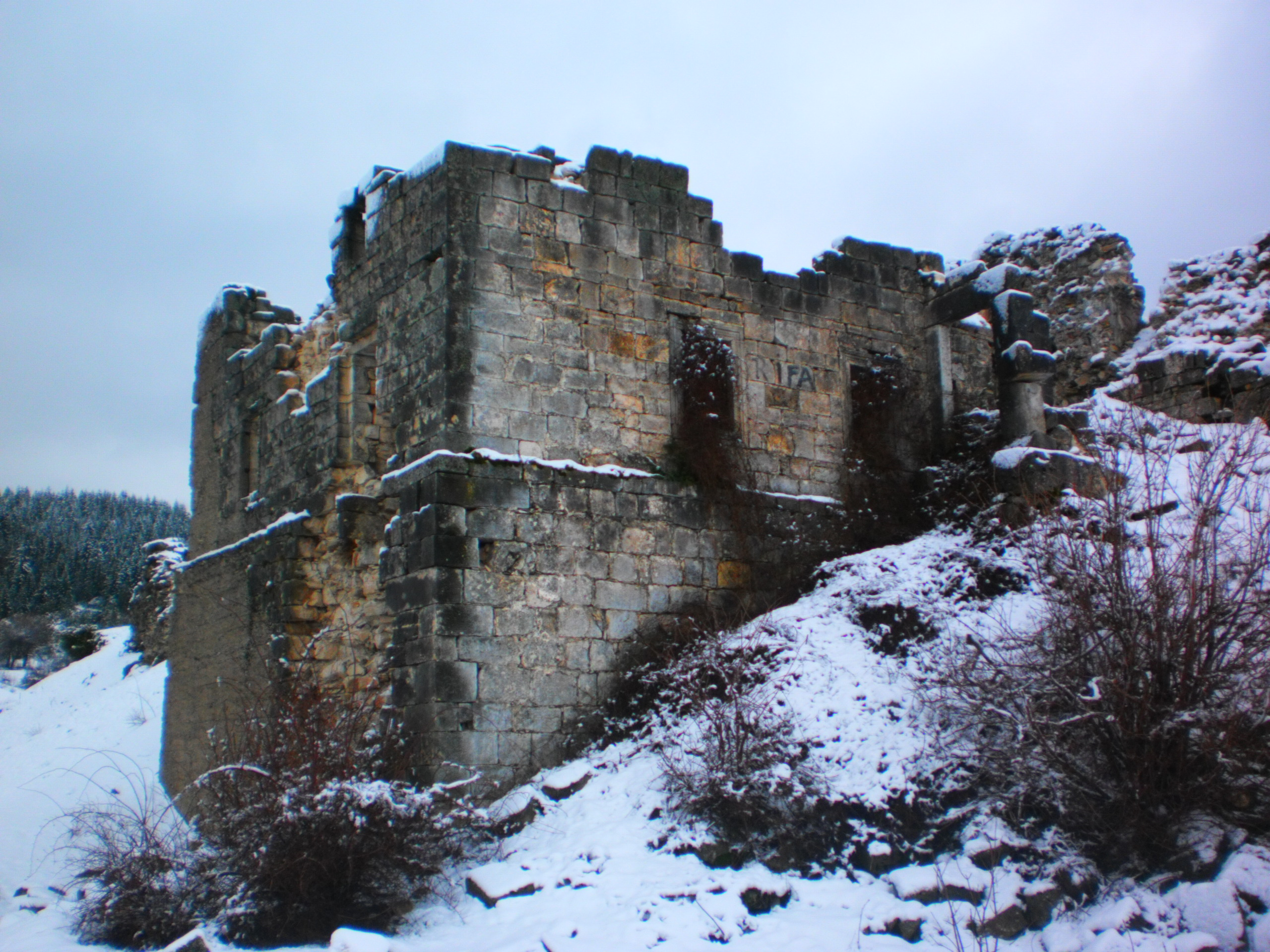
Fortress

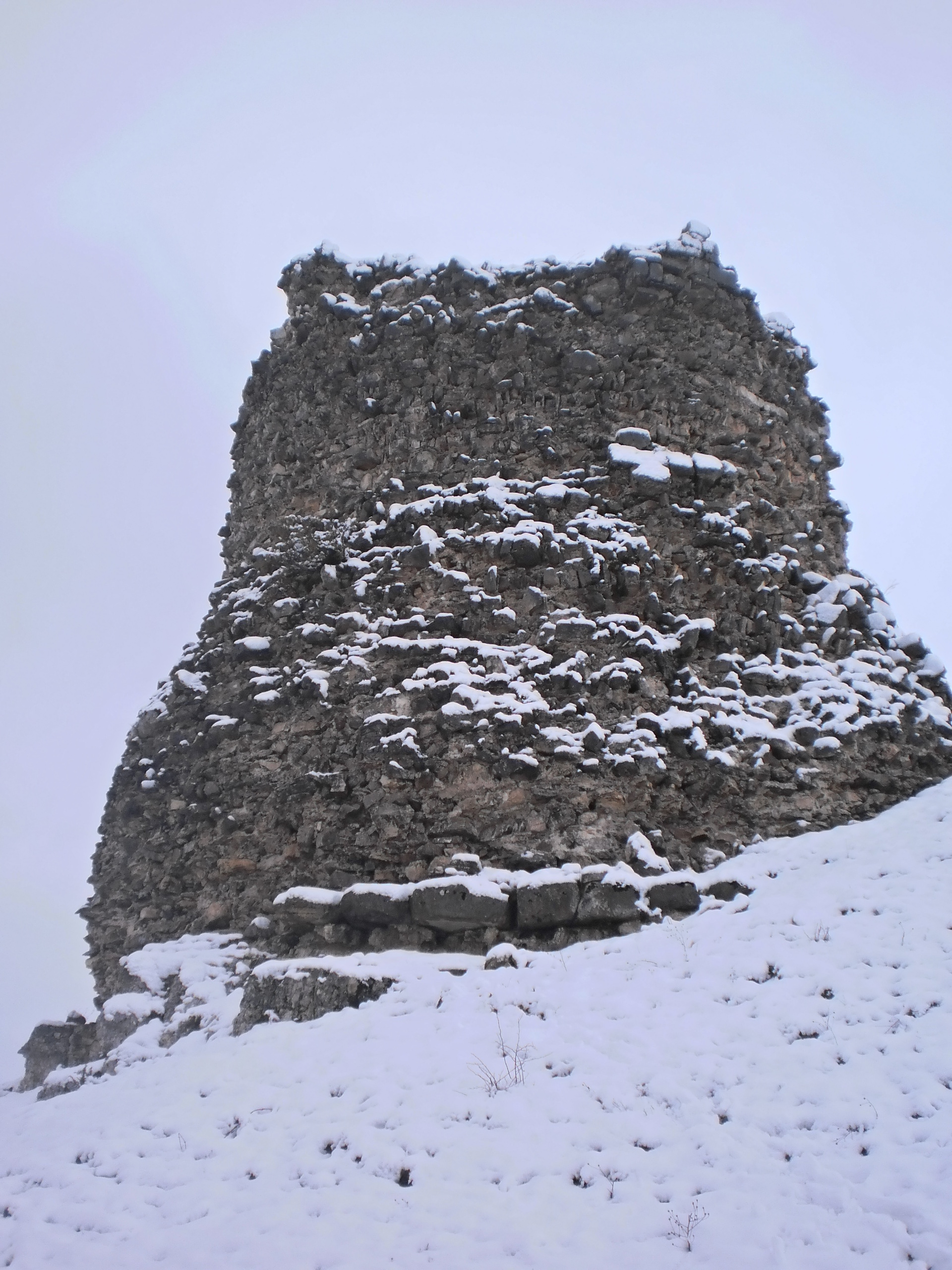
Tower
