= Korićna =

- Village
- Location within Bosnia and Herzegovina
- Coordinates: 43°57′N 16°56′E
- Country: Bosnia and Herzegovina
- Entity: Federation of Bosnia and Herzegovina
- Canton: Canton 10
- Municipality: Glamoč

Area
  - Total: 3.68 km^{2} (1.42 sq mi)

Population (2013)
  - Total: 0
  - Density: 0.0/km^{2} (0.0/sq mi)
- Time zone: UTC+1 (CET)
  - Summer (DST): UTC+2 (CEST)

Korićna is a village in the Municipality of Glamoč in Canton 10 of the Federation of Bosnia and Herzegovina, an entity of Bosnia and Herzegovina.

The climate in Korićna is warm and temperate. Korićna has a significant amount of rainfall during the year. This is true even for the driest month. According to Köppen and Geiger, this climate is classified as Cfb. The temperature here averages 6.9 °C. The average annual rainfall is 1127 mm.

== Demographics ==
According to the 2013 census, the village was uninhabited.

== Bibliography ==
- Ethnicity/National Affiliation, Religion and Mother Tongue (PDF). Sarajevo: Agency for Statistics of Bosnia and Herzegovina. 2019.
