= Podgradina, Glamoč =

Podgradina
- Village
- Location within Bosnia and Herzegovina
- Country: Bosnia and Herzegovina
- Entity: Federation of Bosnia and Herzegovina
- Canton: Canton 10
- Municipality: Glamoč

Area
  - Total: 4.12 km^{2} (1.59 sq mi)

Population (2013)
  - Total: 75
  - Density: 18/km^{2} (47/sq mi)
- Time zone: UTC+1 (CET)
  - Summer (DST): UTC+2 (CEST)

Podgradina is a village in the Municipality of Glamoč in Canton 10 of the Federation of Bosnia and Herzegovina, an entity of Bosnia and Herzegovina.

== Demographics ==
According to the 2013 census, its population was 75.

Ethnicity in 2013
Ethnicity	Number	Percentage
Serbs	68	90.7%
Croats	4	5.3%
Bosniaks	1	1.3%
other/undeclared	2	2.7%
Total	75	100%

== Bibliography ==
- Ethnicity/National Affiliation, Religion and Mother Tongue (PDF). Sarajevo: Agency for Statistics of Bosnia and Herzegovina. 2019.
