= Radaslije =

- Village
- Location within Bosnia and Herzegovina
- Coordinates: 44°03′N 16°50′E
- Country: Bosnia and Herzegovina
- Entity: Federation of Bosnia and Herzegovina
- Canton: Canton 10
- Municipality: Glamoč

Area
  - Total: 17.03 km^{2} (6.58 sq mi)

Population (2013)
  - Total: 340
  - Density: 20/km^{2} (52/sq mi)
- Time zone: UTC+1 (CET)
  - Summer (DST): UTC+2 (CEST)

Radaslije is a village in the Municipality of Glamoč in Canton 10 of the Federation of Bosnia and Herzegovina, an entity of Bosnia and Herzegovina.

== Demographics ==
According to the 2013 census, its population was 340.

Ethnicity in 2013
Ethnicity	Number	Percentage
Bosniaks	186	54.7%
Serbs	123	36.2%
Croats	31	9.1%
Total	340	100%

== Bibliography ==
- Ethnicity/National Affiliation, Religion and Mother Tongue (PDF). Sarajevo: Agency for Statistics of Bosnia and Herzegovina. 2019.
