= Malkočevci =

Malkočevci Малкочевци
- Village
- Location within Bosnia and Herzegovina
- Coordinates: 44°03′N 16°54′E
- Country: Bosnia and Herzegovina
- Entity: Federation of Bosnia and Herzegovina
- Canton: Canton 10
- Municipality: Glamoč

Area
  - Total: 8.89 km^{2} (3.43 sq mi)

Population (2013)
  - Total: 49
  - Density: 5.5/km^{2} (14/sq mi)
- Time zone: UTC+1 (CET)
  - Summer (DST): UTC+2 (CEST)

Malkočevci (Serbian Cyrillic: Малкочевци) is a village in the Municipality of Glamoč in Canton 10 of the Federation of Bosnia and Herzegovina, an entity of Bosnia and Herzegovina.

== Demographics ==
According to the 2013 census, its population was 49.

Ethnicity in 2013
Ethnicity	Number	Percentage
Serbs	33	67.3%
Bosniaks	16	32.7%
Total	49	100%

== Bibliography ==
- Ethnicity/National Affiliation, Religion and Mother Tongue (PDF). Sarajevo: Agency for Statistics of Bosnia and Herzegovina. 2019.
