= Church of Saint Elias, Glamoč =

Church of Saint Elias the Prophet
- Croatian: Crkva svetog Ilije proroka Latin: Ecclesia Sancti Eliae
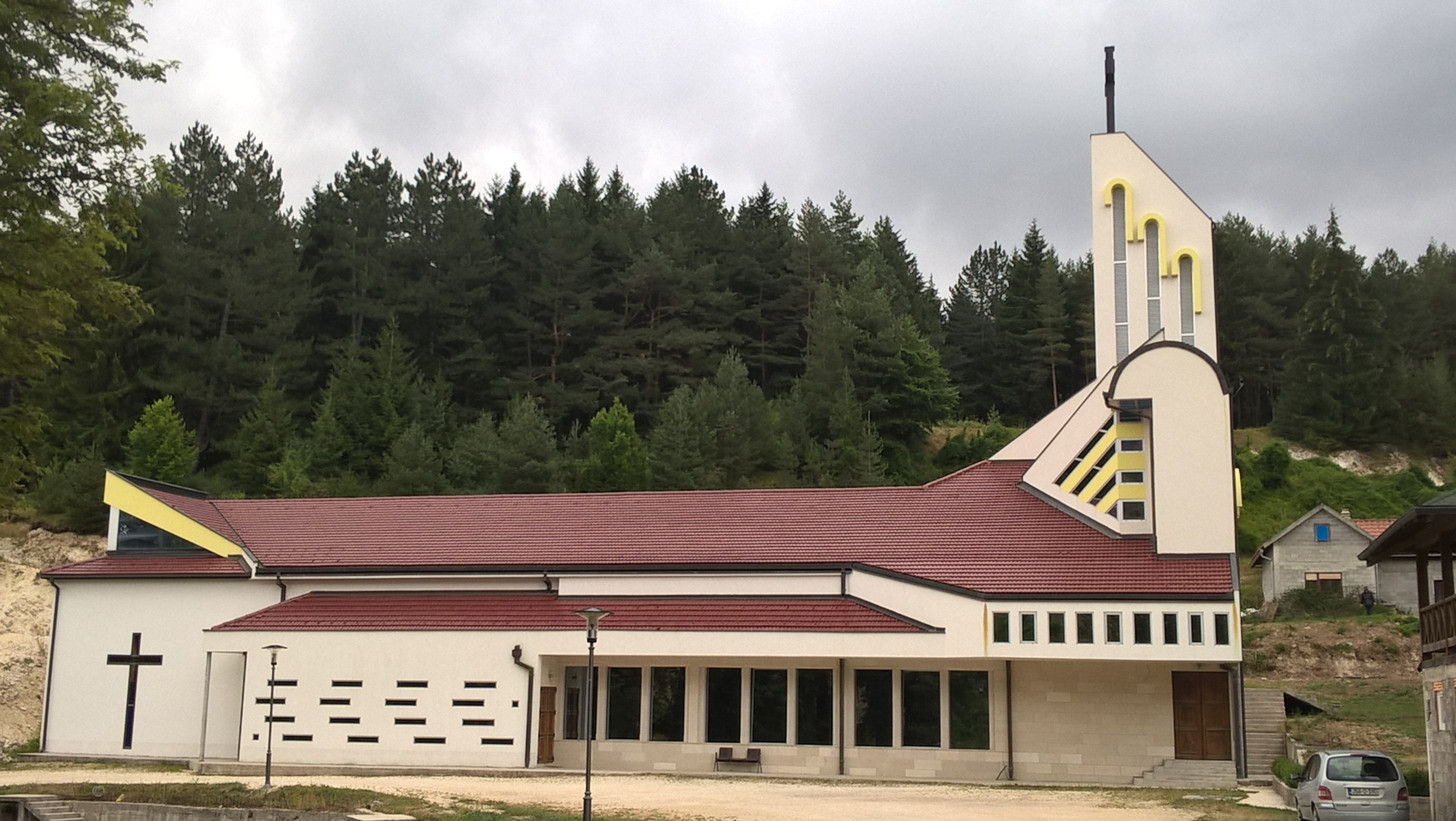
- Church of Saint Elias the Prophet
- 44.0417°N 16.8475°E
- Location: Glamoč
- Country: Bosnia and Herzegovina
- Denomination: Roman Catholic
- Website: zupa-glamoc.info

History
- Status: Parish church
- Dedication: Saint Elias
- Consecrated: 15 November 2014

Architecture
- Functional status: Active
- Style: Modern architecture
- Groundbreaking: 2001

Specifications
- Length: 42 m (138 ft)

Administration
- Province: Sarajevo
- Diocese: Banja Luka
- Deanery: Livno
- Parish: Parish of Saint Elias the Prophet - Glamoč

Clergy
- Archbishop: Tomo Vukšić
- Bishop: Željko Majić
- Dean: Fr Vinko Sičaja, OFM

The Church of Saint Elias (Croatian: Crkva svetog Ilije) is a Roman Catholic church in Glamoč, Bosnia and Herzegovina.

== History ==
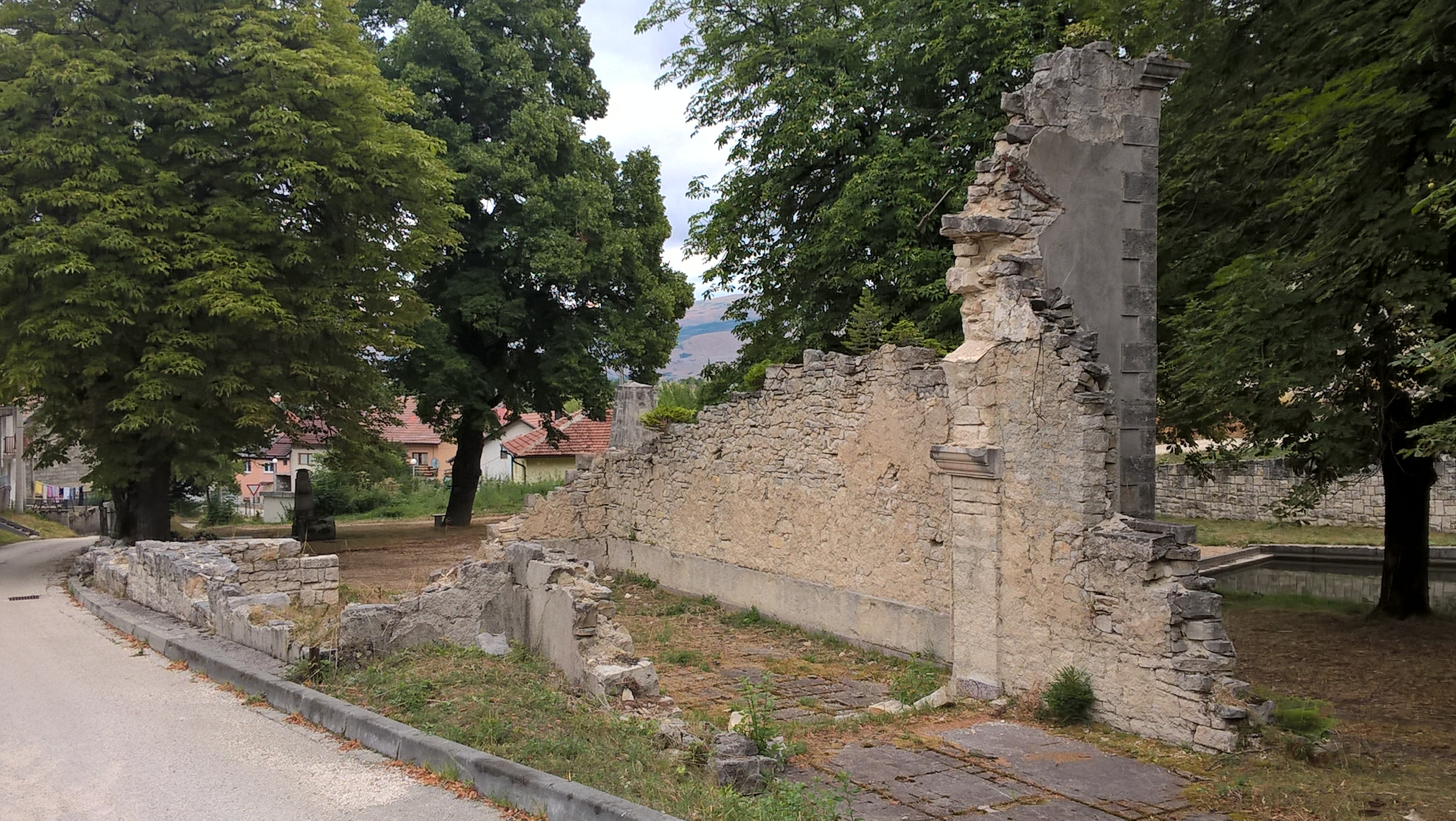
Ruins of the old church

Glamoč parish is documented in the 14th century, but disappeared during the Ottoman rule in Bosnia.

The parish of Glamoč was restored as an independent chaplaincy in 1864, and in 1872 it became a parish again. The first parish church of Saint Elias in Glamoč was built in 1903. The church was looted and burned down during World War II and rebuilt in 1969. As part of the inter-ethnic Bosnian war, Serb soldiers mined and destroyed the church and rectory in 1992.

The new rectory was built in 1997 and until 2009 it served as a place for the celebration of the liturgy. The building of the present church started in 2001 near the ruins of the old church.

Three church bells, cast in the Grassmayr foundry in Innsbruck, were blessed and placed on the bell tower on 21 December 2005. The biggest bell weighs 542 kilograms (1,195 lb) and is dedicated to the Queen of Croats. The bell dedicated to Saint John the Baptist weighs 348 kg (767 lb), and one dedicated to Saint Elias weighs 260 kg (570 lb).

The church was consecrated by bishop Franjo Komarica on 15 November 2014.

== Gallery ==
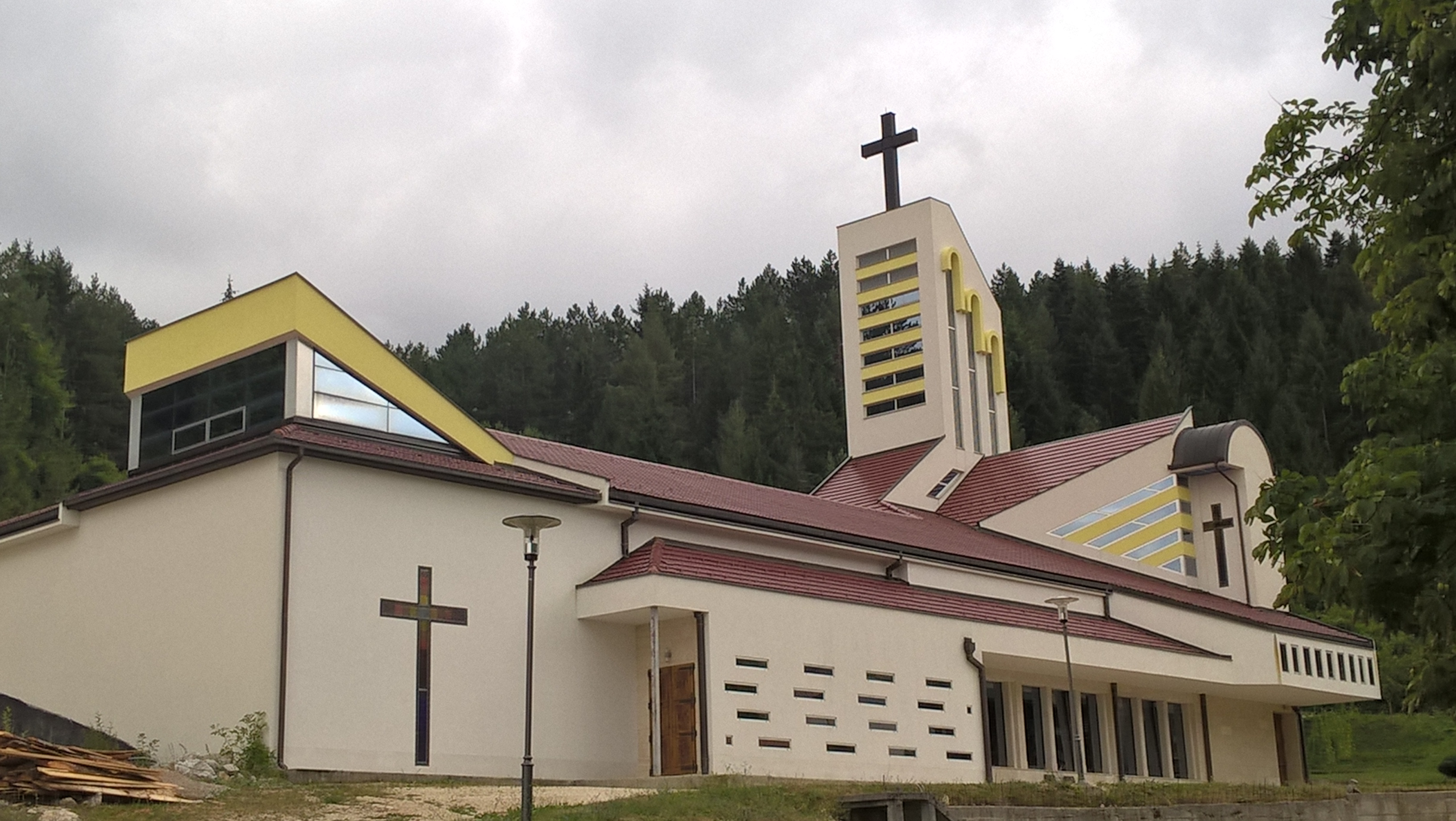
The church from north

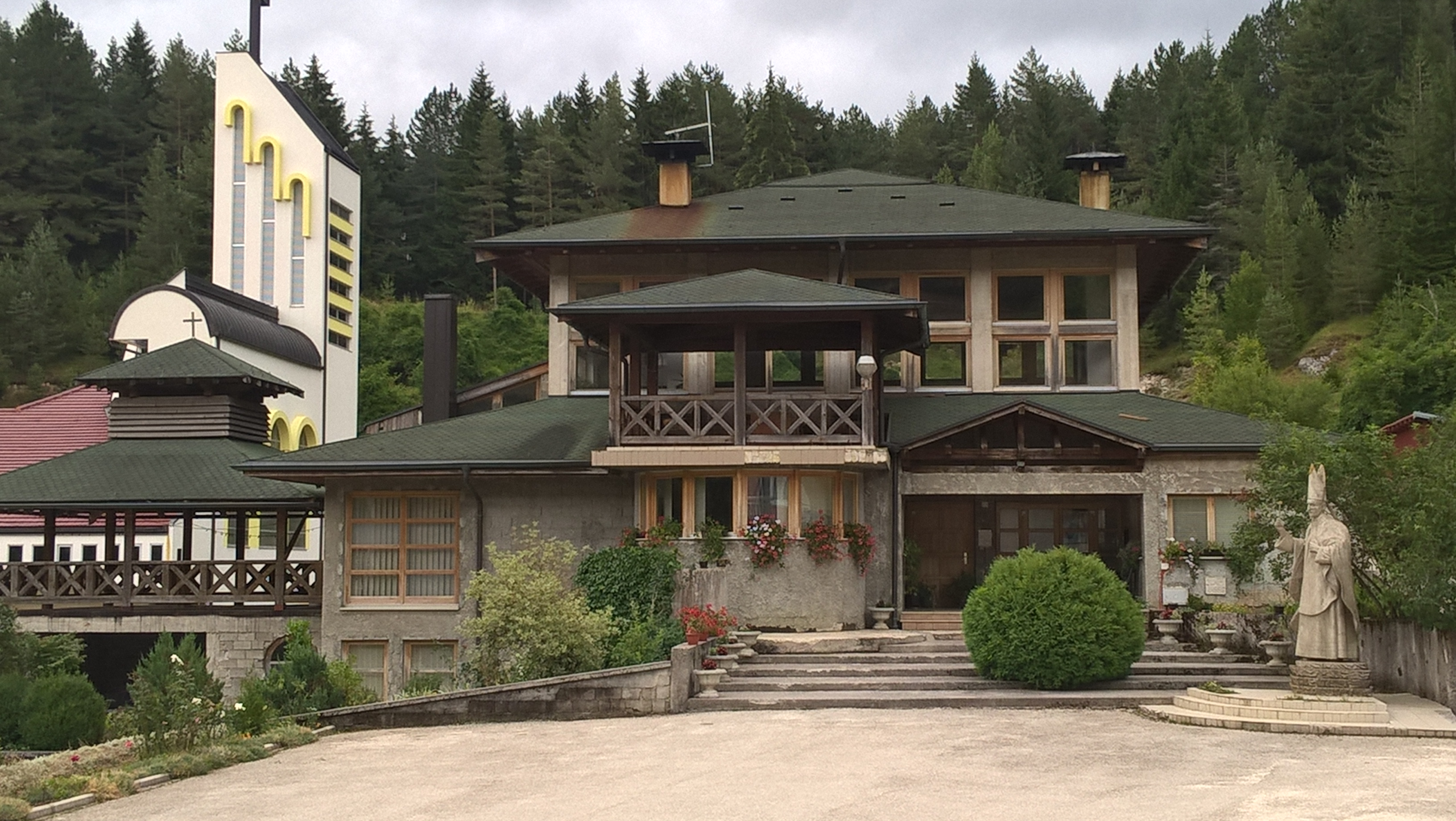
Parish rectory

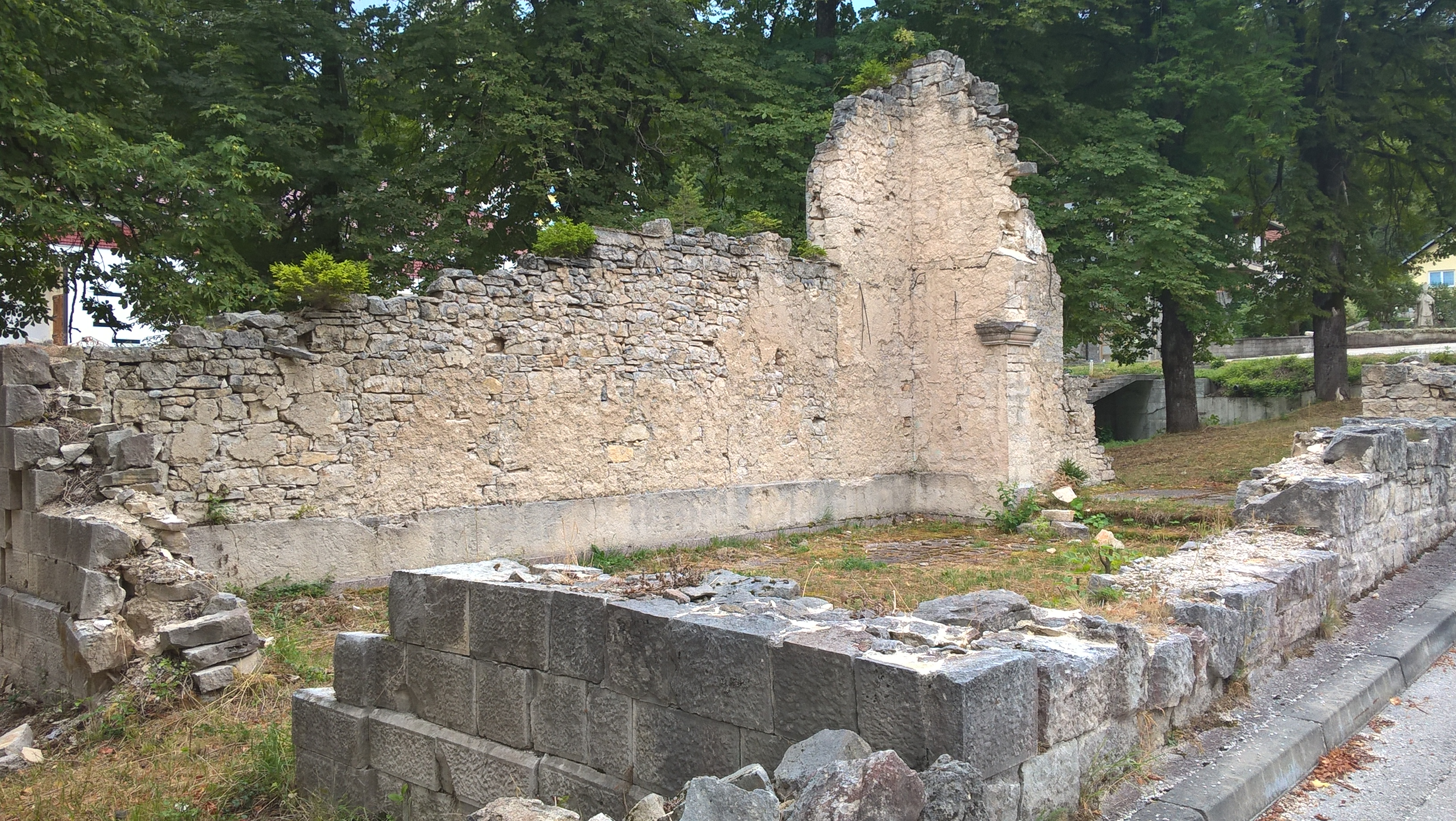
Ruins of the old church

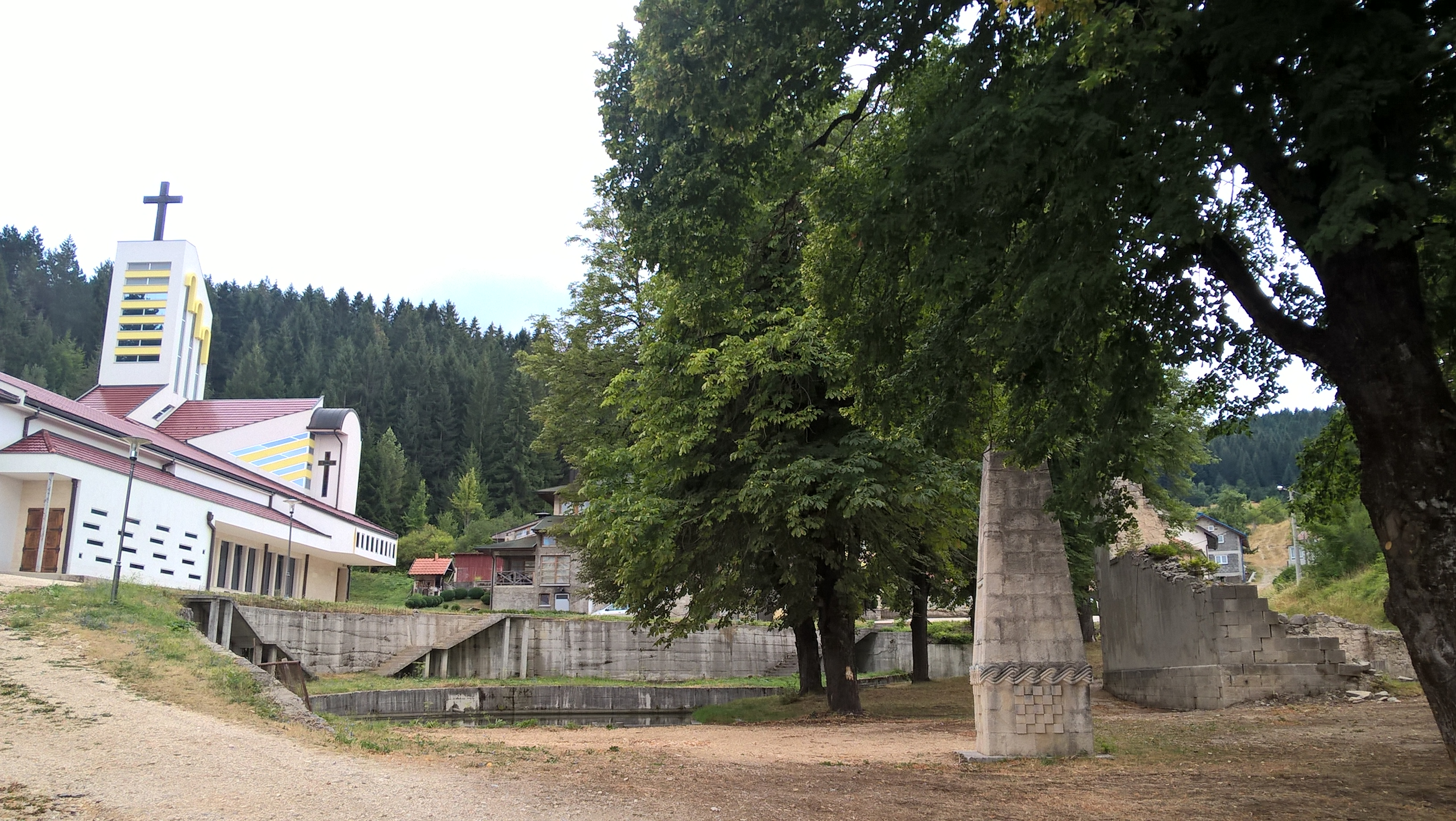
Parks around churches

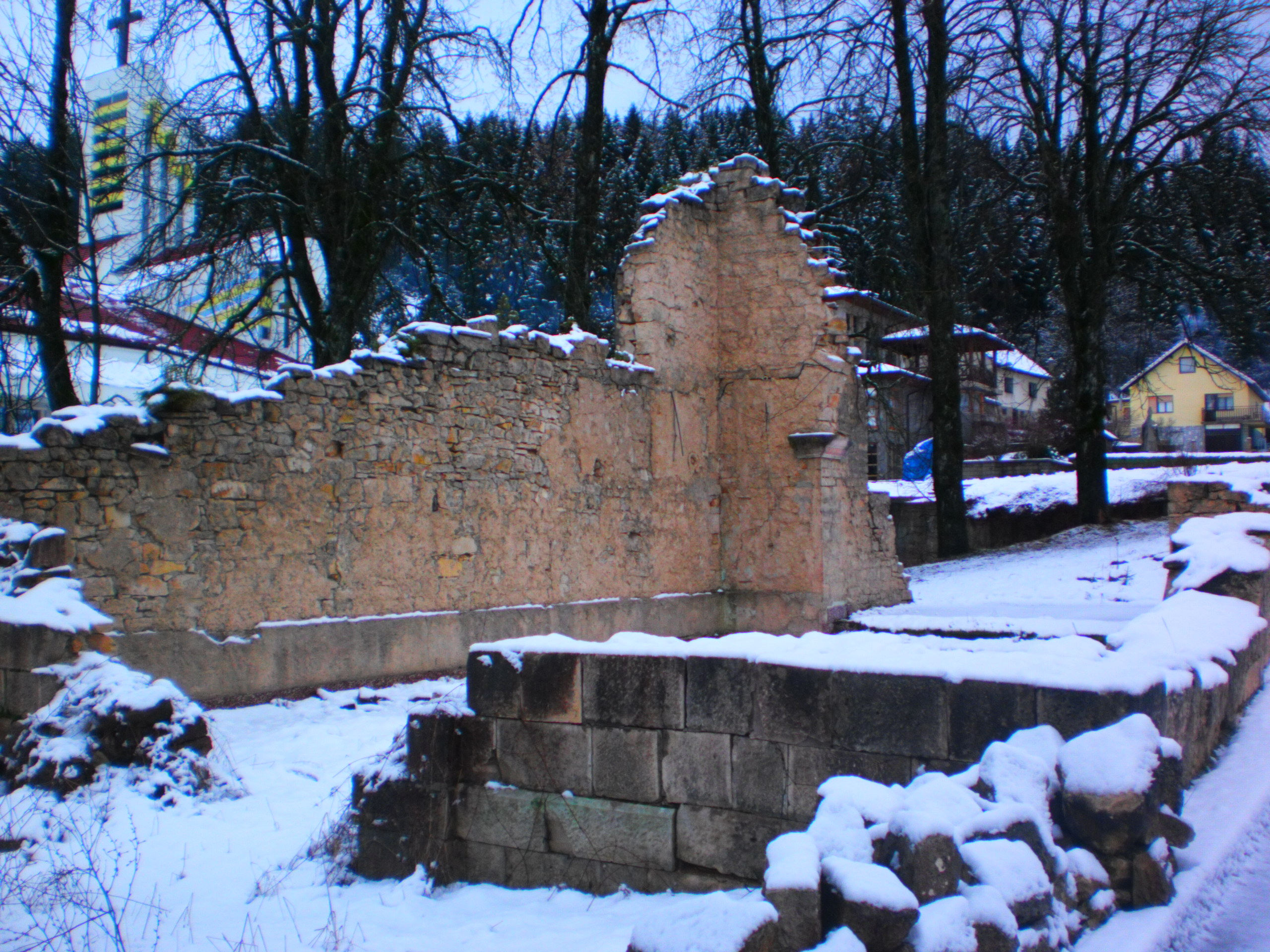
Ruins of church under snow

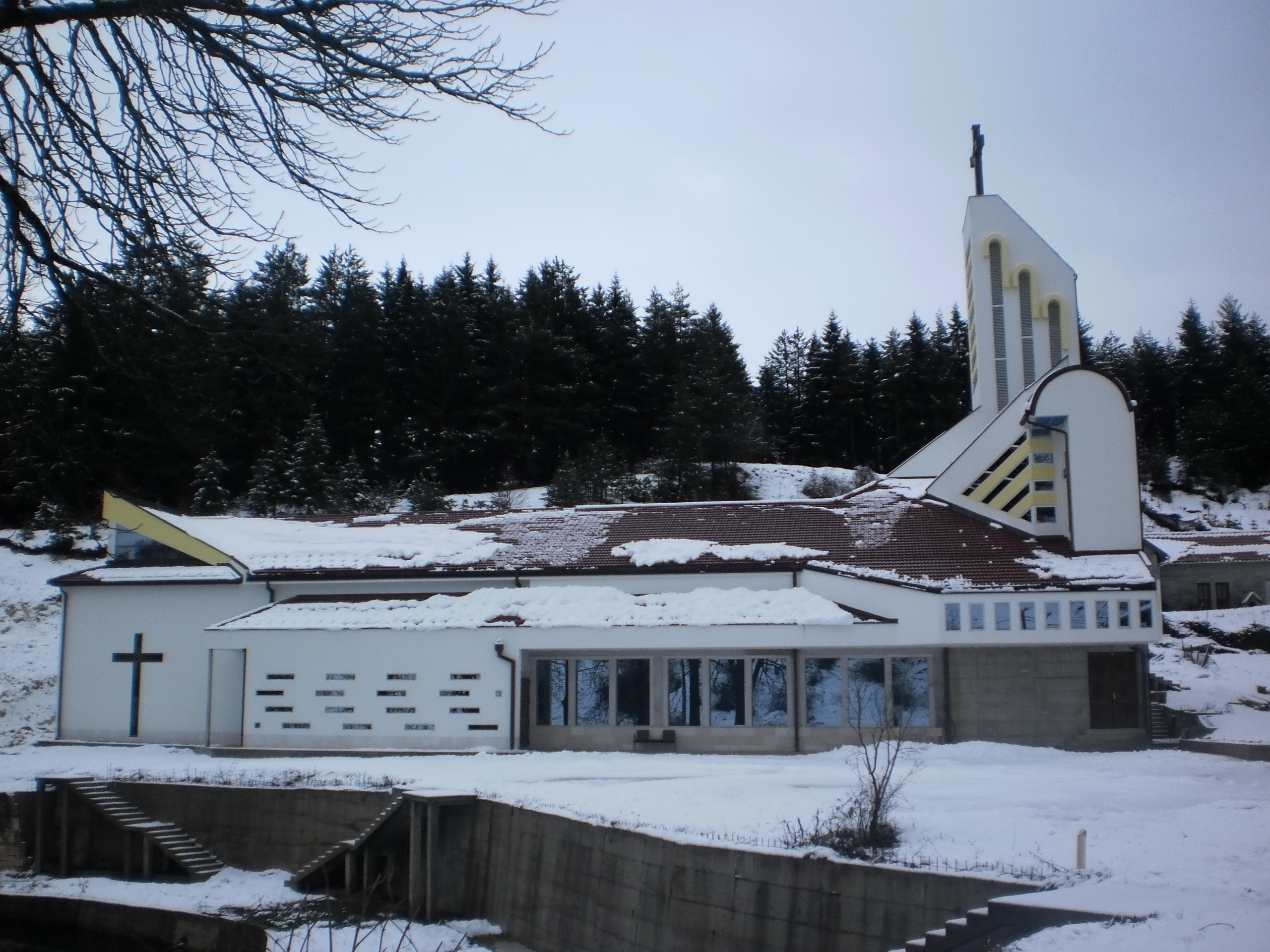
Church under snow
