= Ćirići =

Ćirići Ћирићи
- Village
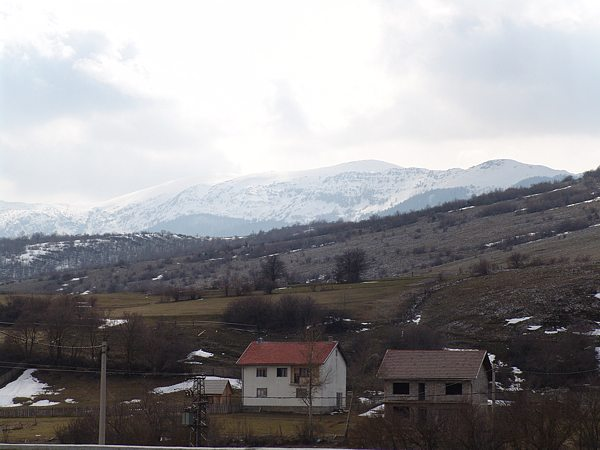

- Location within Bosnia and Herzegovina
- Coordinates: 44°02′16″N 16°51′55″E
- Country: Bosnia and Herzegovina
- Entity: Federation of Bosnia and Herzegovina
- Canton: Canton 10
- Municipality: Glamoč

Area
  - Total: 2.86 km^{2} (1.10 sq mi)

Population (2013)
  - Total: 28
  - Density: 9.8/km^{2} (25/sq mi)
- Time zone: UTC+1 (CET)
  - Summer (DST): UTC+2 (CEST)

Ćirići (Serbian Cyrillic: Ћирићи) is a village in the Municipality of Glamoč in Canton 10 of the Federation of Bosnia and Herzegovina, an entity of Bosnia and Herzegovina.

== Demographics ==
According to the 2013 census, its population was 28.

Ethnicity in 2013
Ethnicity	Number	Percentage
Serbs	17	60.7%
Bosniaks	11	39.3%
Total	28	100%

== Bibliography ==
- Ethnicity/National Affiliation, Religion and Mother Tongue (PDF). Sarajevo: Agency for Statistics of Bosnia and Herzegovina. 2019.
