= Glamoč =

- Town
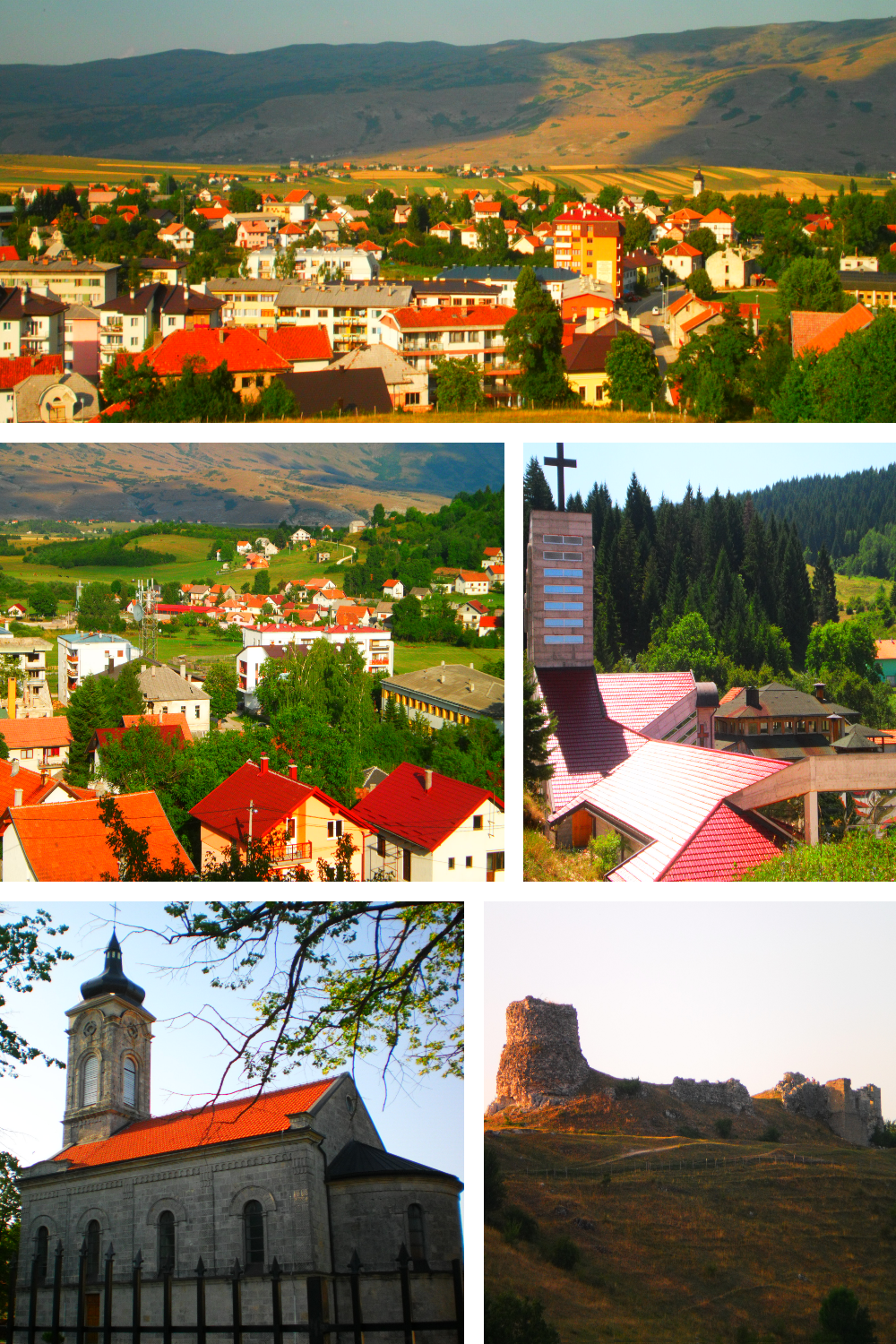
- From upper left: Panoramic view of Glamoč, panoramic view of Lamele and Luke neighbourhoods, Catholic church of Saint Elias, Orthodox church, Fortress

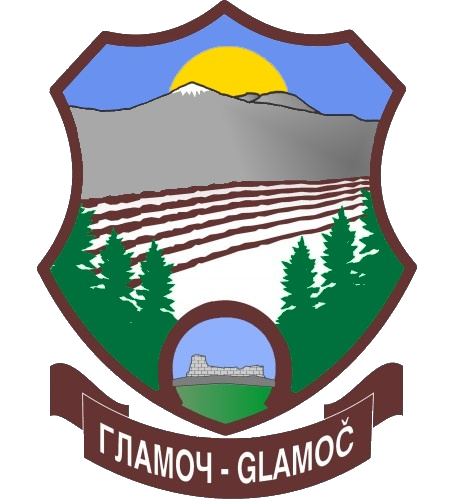
- Seal

- Location of Glamoč within Bosnia and Herzegovina
- Coordinates: 44°02′42″N 16°51′00″E
- Country: Bosnia and Herzegovina
- Entity: Federation of Bosnia and Herzegovina
- Canton: Canton 10
- Municipality: Glamoč

Government
  - Mayor: Nebojša Radivojša (SNSD)

Area
  - Total: 16.88 km^{2} (6.52 sq mi)

Population (2013)
  - Total: 1,885
- Time zone: UTC+1 (CET)
  - Summer (DST): UTC+2 (CEST)
- Postal code: 80230
- Area code: +387 34

Glamoč is a town and the seat of the Municipality of Glamoč in Canton 10 of the Federation of Bosnia and Herzegovina, an entity of Bosnia and Herzegovina. It is situated in southwestern Bosnia and Herzegovina, at the foothills of Staretina and Velika Golija mountains, and on the edge of the central part of the Glamočko Polje.

== Name ==
During the Ottoman era the town was recorded as Biograd (White town), Belgradčik and Biogradaz.

== Geography ==
=== Climate ===
The climate of Glamoč is classified as an oceanic climate (Cfb in Köppen climate classification system), near the boundary of the humid continental climate. Glamoč has four separate seasons. Summers are warm, and winters are cold, without a discernible dry season.

Weather box

Climate data for Glamoč
Month	Jan	Feb	Mar	Apr	May	Jun	Jul	Aug	Sep	Oct	Nov	Dec	Year
Mean daily maximum °C	0.7	2.6	6.6	11.4	16.5	20.2	22.7	22.4	18.3	12.2	6.7	2.5	11.9
Daily mean °C	−1.8	−0.6	2.8	6.9	11.6	15.2	17.3	16.9	13.3	8.3	3.8	0.1	7.8
Mean daily minimum °C	−4.2	−3.8	−1	2.5	6.8	10.2	11.9	11.4	8.3	4.5	1	−2.3	3.8
Average precipitation mm	81	85	80	85	86	98	72	71	77	101	139	138	1,113
Mean daily maximum °F	33.3	36.7	43.9	52.5	61.7	68.4	72.9	72.3	64.9	54.0	44.1	36.5	53.4
Daily mean °F	28.8	30.9	37.0	44.4	52.9	59.4	63.1	62.4	55.9	46.9	38.8	32.2	46.1
Mean daily minimum °F	24.4	25.2	30	36.5	44.2	50.4	53.4	52.5	46.9	40.1	34	27.9	38.8
Average precipitation inches	3.2	3.3	3.1	3.3	3.4	3.9	2.8	2.8	3.0	4.0	5.5	5.4	43.7

== History ==
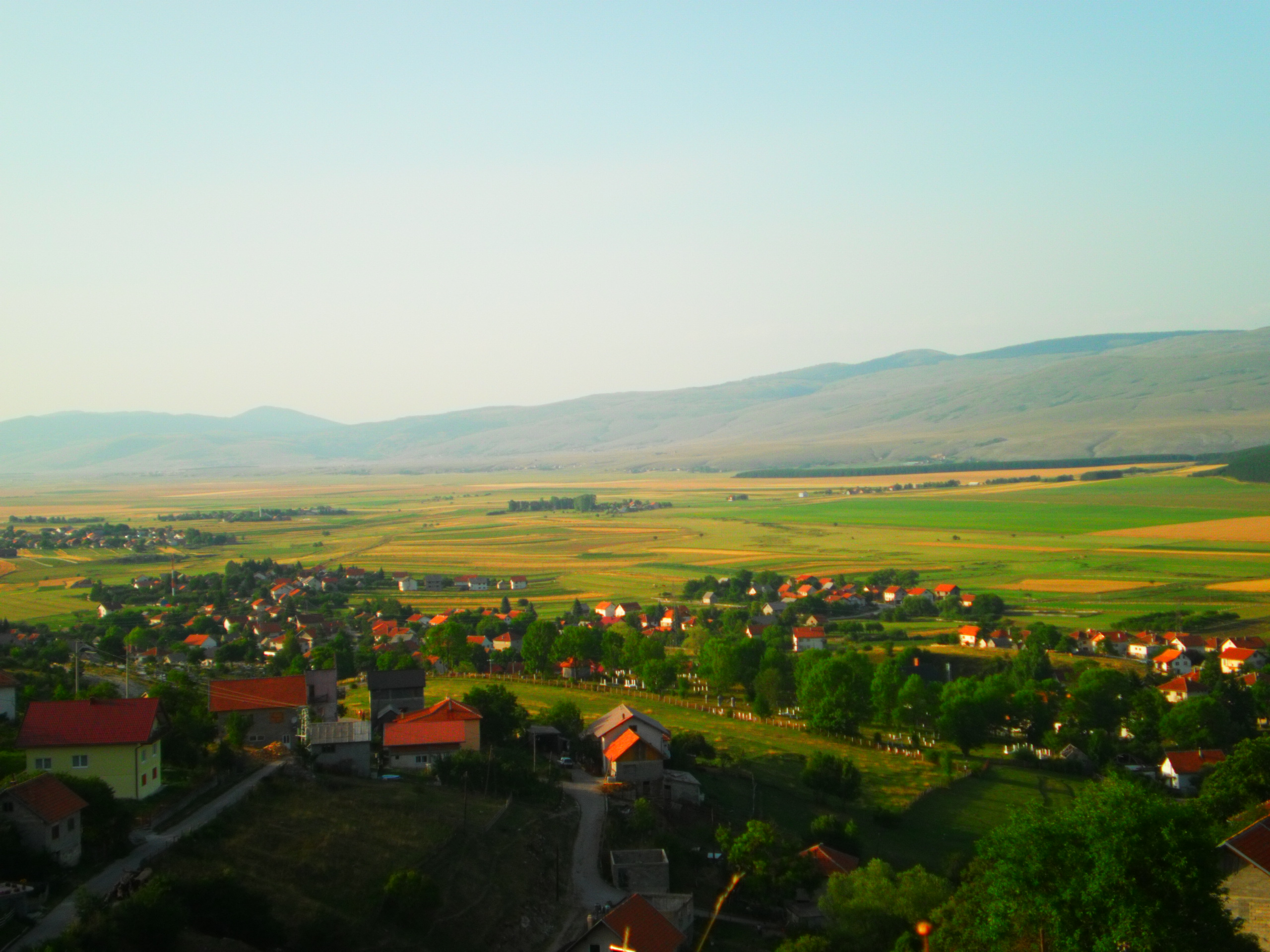
Lower Field of Glamoč

The Glamoč area has been inhabited since at least Neolithic times. In the late Bronze Age, the Neolithic population was replaced by more warlike Indo-European tribes known as the Illyrians, specifically the Dalmatae. Their capital was Delminium, which was located in today's Tomislavgrad. The Dalmatae left many artefacts which allow us to learn about their presence in this area. The most important remains are the gradine, remains of Illyrian settlements which were distributed along the Glamoč field. 34 gradinas were found on the territory of Glamoč. The settlements were strategically placed for defence. The Romans took over 200 years to occupy this region.

After the Roman conquest, municipia was established in this area, which was located in the Roman province of Dalmatia. The most important of them was Salvium, which was previously an Illyrian settlement. Salvium is located 6 km away from the town of Glamoč. An early Christian basilica was discovered on the territory of Salvium. It was built in the 6th century, probably on the remains of a Roman temple. North of Glamoč, a second basilica was built, probably at the same time as the aforementioned basilica in Salvium was built. These basilicas belonged to the diocese of Salona. In 533, they became part of the newly established diocese in Ludrum (Knin, Croatia). The basilicas were probably destroyed during the invasion of the Avars in 597.

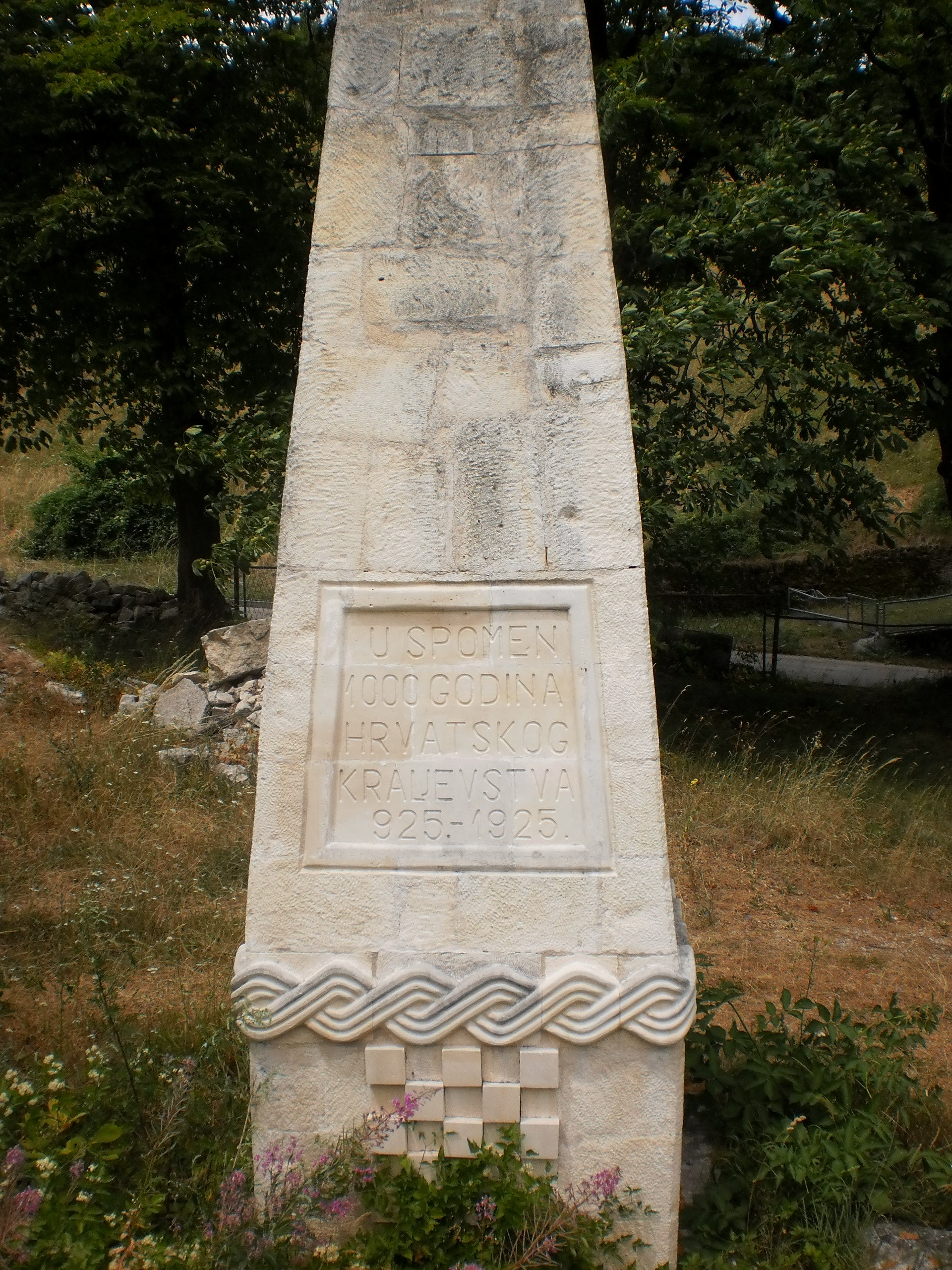
Monument to the thousandth anniversary of the Croatian Kingdom

With the collapse of Roman rule in the 5th century, first barbarian tribes and then the Byzantine Empire occupied this region. In the seventh century, South Slavs migrated to the Balkan region. They brought Slavic culture and customs which gradually merged with the Illyrian culture. The community was granted the status of parish (župa) in the County of Hlivno after Tomislav established the Kingdom of Croatia in 925. Therefore, the town, by the end of the 10th century, had developed all the infrastructure necessary for acquiring the status of the parish. In 1078 it was mentioned as a boundary parish of Archdiocese of Split.

A church, dedicated to the Virgin Mary was built. Near the town, the church of St. Catherine and the Franciscan Monastery of St. Elias was built. Within the monastery, the Church of the Assumption of the Blessed Virgin Mary was located. The church was mentioned in 1446 when Pope Eugene IV commended it in particular. The remains of the were found in several surrounding villages which indicates the dense population of the area. Bosnian ban Stjepan II Kotromanić conquered Glamoč and neighbouring towns, Hlivno (Livno) and Dlmno (Tomislavgrad) in 1326. Since then, this area has been called Tropolje, meaning three fields, or Završje. Until 1357, Glamoč was a possession of the Hrvatinić noble family.

In 1357, Bosnian ban Tvrtko I succumbed to Hungarian demands and ceded Tropolje to the Hungarian king Louis I the Great. That same year, Grgur Stjepanić was mentioned as Lord of Glamoč. He, along with other nobles of Tropolje, rebelled against Tvrtko, so Glamoč remained under Hungarian rule until 1387. In the meantime, Tvrtko was crowned as the King of Bosnia and with the help of Hrvoje Vukčić Hrvatinić he regained the area. At the end of the 14th century, Pavao Maštrović Klešić became Lord of Glamoč. Bosnian King Stjepan Ostoja took his lordship, but when he needed Pavao as an ally he returned it to him in 1404.

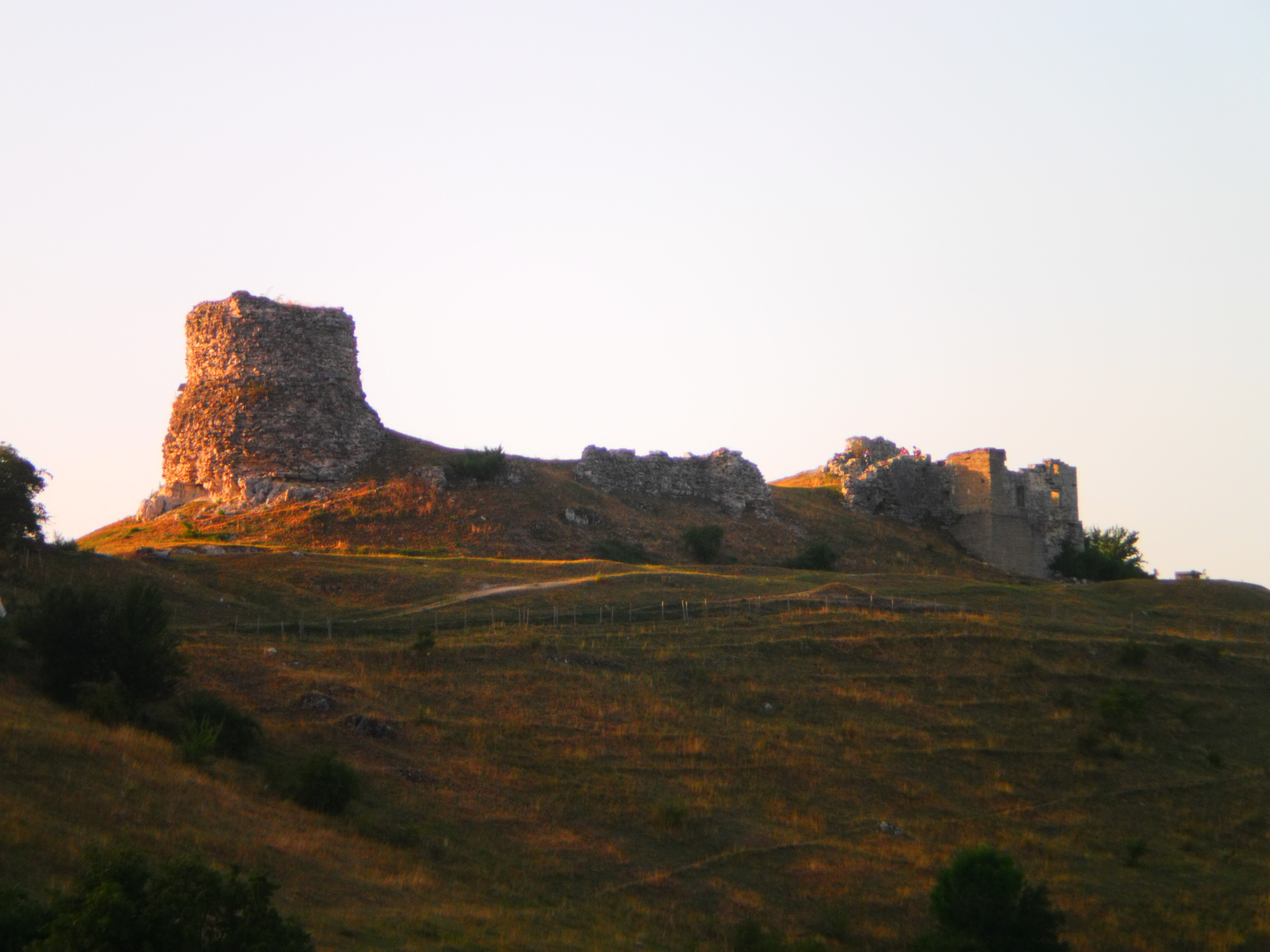
Ruins of the Fortress

Glamoč fell under Ottoman rule in the year 1515. In 1516, it was mentioned as a nahiye Dlamoč or Belgrad in the kadiluk of Neretva. It remained a part of the Bosnia Sanjak until 1537. In 1550 and 1574 it was recorded as a nahiye in the Skradin kadiluk in the Sanjak of Klis. After Klis was liberated in 1648, Glamoč became part of the Livno kadiluk.

During the Ottoman period the town was called Biograd or Belgradčik. It was recorded under this name until 1833. A Venetian-Dalmatian source from the first half of the 17th century recorded that Biogradaz was a fortress with several towers. In the second half of the 18th century, it was noted that the town lies along the Dalmatian border, and that it is well fortified, but that it has little artillery. The fortress was abandoned in 1851 and partially demolished in 1882.

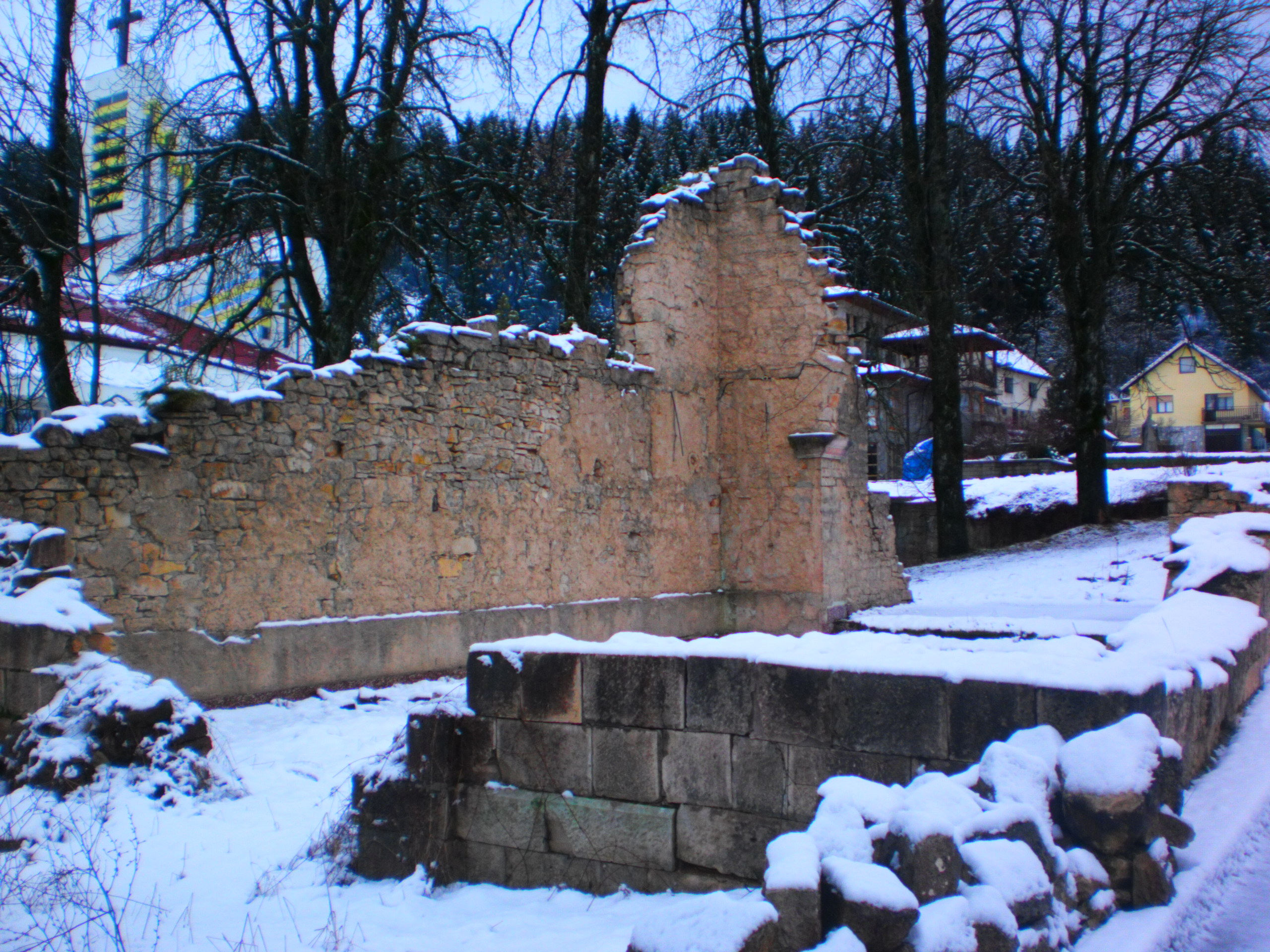
Catholic church built in 1903 and demolished in 1992 during the Bosnian War

In 1878, with the Congress of Berlin, Bosnia and Herzegovina, including Glamoč, came under Austro-Hungarian rule. Complete annexation followed in 1908. Administratively, the town was located in the Travnik District. At that time, a significant number of Catholics, mostly from Dalmatia, immigrated, so the Catholic church of Saint Elias was built in 1903.

After the end of World War I and the dissolution of Austria-Hungary, the province of Bosnia and Herzegovina, along with Glamoč, became a part of the State of Slovenes, Croats and Serbs and soon thereafter Kingdom of Serbs, Croats and Slovenes. After the Vidovdan Constitution of 1921 established new administrative divisions, the town became part Travnik County. The country changed its name to the Kingdom of Yugoslavia in 1929, and then Glamoč became part of a new administrative unit, Vrbas Banovina.

On 9 January 1992, the Bosnian Serb Assembly adopted the Proclamation of the Republic of the Serb people of Bosnia and Herzegovina. On 28 February 1992, the Constitution of Republika Srpska was adopted and declared that the state's territory included Serb autonomous regions, municipalities, and other Serbian ethnic entities in Bosnia and Herzegovina, including Glamoč, where Bosnian Serbs were 79% of the population.

In early 1992, many Bosniaks and Bosnian Croats left Glamoč. Those who remained suffered at the hands of the Serb forces. An early victim was a Croatian physician, Dr Alojzije Kelava, who was murdered in the city centre on 24 February 1992 by Petar Vrakela, member of the Army of Republika Srpska (VRS).

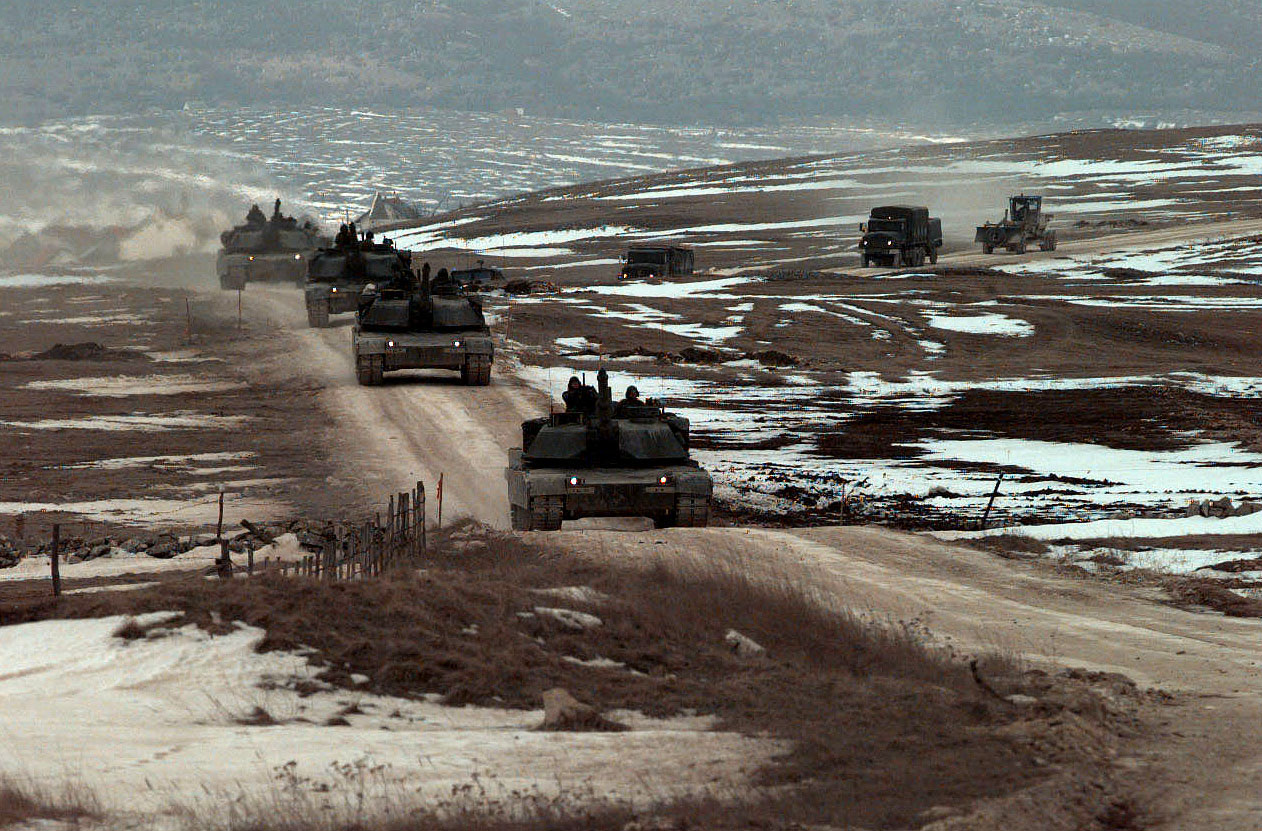
U.S. Army tanks deployed to Glamoč as part of the Stabilization Force (SFOR)

Shortly thereafter, Serbian forces started ethnic cleansing of the non-Serb population and the destruction of the Bosnian-Herzegovinian cultural and historical heritage. In 1992, the Catholic church, the rectory and the town's mosque were destroyed. The parish priest of Glamoč, Rev. Zvonimir Matijević, was arrested and taken to Knin prison where he was tortured.

From Glamoč field, Serbs besieged and bombarded the nearby town of Livno. By early 1995, most of the non-Serb population had left the municipality. On 25 July 1995, HV and HVO began Operation Summer '95. In the next few days, a large part of the Serb population left Glamoč, led by the VRS. On 29 July, HVO troops attacking from the south captured the town.

Soon, the area was inhabited by refugees from Republika Srpska and central Bosnia. Some remained in Glamoč. Meanwhile, some of the Croats and Bosniaks who had left Glamoč at the beginning of the war and Serbs who left Glamoč after the Croatian Army captured it have returned. After the signing of the Dayton Agreement, Glamoč became a municipality of Canton 10, Federation of Bosnia and Herzegovina. The war has caused economic and demographic decline of the municipality. Large funds are dedicated in the reconstruction of destroyed infrastructure, but the area is still underdeveloped.

== Demographics ==
Nationalities structure, according to the 2013 census
1. Croats (40.4%)
2. Serbs (29.5%)
3. Bosniaks (29.1%)

=== Ethnic composition ===
Ethnic composition – Glamoč town
	2013.	1991.	1981.	1971.	1961.
Total	1,885 (100,0%)	4,256 (100,0%)	3,777 (100,0%)	2,597 (100,0%)	1,626 (100,0%)
Croats	762 (40,42%)	43 (1,010%)	52 (1,377%)	85 (3,273%)	65 (3,998%)
Serbs	556 (29,50%)	3,254 (76,46%)	2,686 (71,11%)	1,701 (65,50%)	846 (52,03%)
Bosniaks	549 (29,12%)	852 (20,02%)	809 (21,42%)	758 (29,19%)	450 (27,68%)
Others	18 (0,955%)	16 (0,376%)	9 (0,238%)	15 (0,578%)	4 (0,246%)
Yugoslavs		91 (2,138%)	213 (5,639%)	23 (0,886%)	251 (15,44%)
Montenegrins			4 (0,106%)	5 (0,193%)	6 (0,369%)
Albanians			3 (0,079%)	9 (0,347%)	2 (0,123%)
Macedonians			1 (0,026%)	1 (0,039%)	1 (0,062%)
Slovenes					1 (0,062%)

== Notable people ==
- Miroslav Čangalović, opera singer
- Obrad Piljak, politician
- Pavao Posilović, Catholic bishop and writer
- Slavko Zagorac, retired footballer and manager
- Stojan Srdić, writer
- Todor Petrović, footballer
- Vule Trivunović, footballer
- Zaim Topčić, writer

== Other ==
- Ivo Lola Ribar, Yugoslav communist was killed near Glamoč by airstrike

== See also ==
- Glamoč Fortress
- Church of Saint Elias, Glamoč
- Canton 10
