= Stojan Srdić =

Serbian playwright and novelist

Stojan Srdić (Cyrillic Стојан Срдић; Glamoč 20 September 1950) is a Serbian playwright and novelist who lives in Belgrade.
