= Podglavica, Danilovgrad =

Podglavica
- Village
- Location within Montenegro
- Coordinates: 42.525043°N 19.173740°E
- Country: Montenegro
- Municipality: Danilovgrad

Population (2011)
  - Total: 231
- Time zone: UTC+1 (CET)
  - Summer (DST): UTC+2 (CEST)

Podglavica (Serbian Cyrillic: Подглавица) is a village in the municipality of Danilovgrad, Montenegro.

== Demographics ==
According to the 2011 census, its population was 231.

Ethnicity in 2011
Ethnicity	Number	Percentage
Montenegrins	134	58.0%
Serbs	87	37.7%
other/undeclared	10	4.3%
Total	231	100%
