= Staretina =

Coordinates: 44°05′N 16°41′E

Staretina is a mountain in the municipality of Livno, Bosnia and Herzegovina. It has an altitude of 1,633 metres (5,358 ft).

== See also ==
- List of mountains in Bosnia and Herzegovina
