= Municipality of Glamoč =

Municipality of Glamoč Општина Гламоч
- Municipality
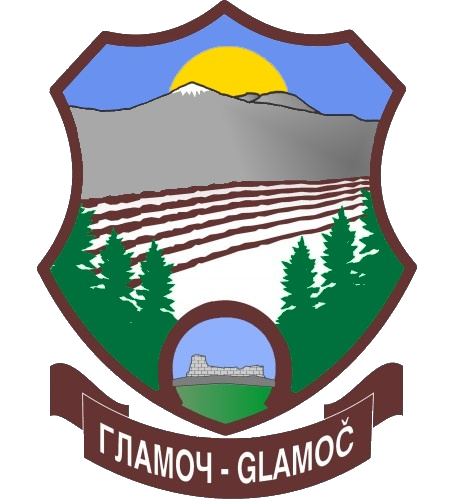
- Coat of arms

- Location of the Municipality of Glamoč within Bosnia and Herzegovina
- Country: Bosnia and Herzegovina
- Entity: Federation of Bosnia and Herzegovina
- Canton: Canton 10
- Seat: Glamoč

Government
  - Municipal president: Nebojša Radivojša (SNSD)

Area
  - Total: 1,003.6 km^{2} (387.5 sq mi)

Population (2013)
  - Total: 3,860
  - Density: 3.85/km^{2} (9.96/sq mi)
- Demonym: Glamočan
- Website: opstinaglamoc.ba

Municipality of Glamoč (Serbian Cyrillic: Општина Гламоч; Croatian: Općina Glamoč) is a municipality in Canton 10 of the Federation of Bosnia and Herzegovina, an entity of Bosnia and Herzegovina. Its seat is in Glamoč. According to the 2013 census, it had a population of 3,860.

== History ==
=== Austria-Hungary ===
During the Austro-Hungarian rule in Bosnia and Herzegovina, the present-day territory of Bosnia and Herzegovina was divided into counties (Serbo-Croatian: okrug) and kotars (districts). The Kotar of Glamoč belonged to the Travnik Okrug.

=== Kingdom of Yugoslavia ===
The Kingdom of Yugoslavia retained the local organisation inherited from Austria-Hungary, with the country being divided into oblasts instead of okrugs since 1922. The Srez of Glamoč belonged to the Travnik Oblast.

From 1929, the country was divided into banovinas. The Srez of Glamoč became a part of the Vrbas Banovina.

== Demographics ==
Nationalities
1. Serbs (43.5%)
2. Bosniaks (32.4%)
3. Croats (23.5%)

According to the 2013 census, the population of Glamoč was 3,860.

Nationality	Population 2013	%
Serbs	1,679	43.50
Bosniaks	1,251	32.41
Croats	906	23.47
Others	24	0.62
Total	3,860	

== Bibliography ==
- Ethnicity/National Affiliation, Religion and Mother Tongue (PDF). Sarajevo: Agency for Statistics of Bosnia and Herzegovina. 2019.
- Zovko, Ljubomir (2007). Studije iz pravne povijesti Bosne i Hercegovine 1878.-1941 [The studies of legal history of Bosnia and Herzegovina 1878-1941] (in Croatian). Mostar: Faculty of Law, University of Mostar. ISBN 9789958927126.
