= 1970–71 Yugoslav Cup =

1971 Yugoslav Football Cup
24th Marshal Tito Cup

Tournament details
- Country: Yugoslavia
- Dates: 28 February – 26 May
- Teams: 16

Final positions
- Champions: Red Star (9th title)
- Runners-up: Sloboda Tuzla
- Cup Winners' Cup: Red Star

Tournament statistics
- Matches played: 16
- Goals scored: 49 (3.06 per match)
- Goals scored in penalty shoot-outs not included.

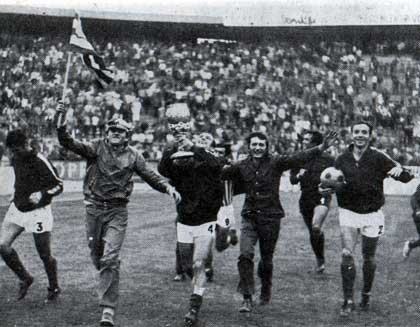
The Red Star players' party after winning the 1970-1971 Yugoslavia Cup against Sloboda Tuzla

The 1970–71 Yugoslav Cup was the 24th season of the top football knockout competition in SFR Yugoslavia, the Yugoslav Cup (Serbo-Croatian: Kup Jugoslavije), also known as the "Marshal Tito Cup" (Kup Maršala Tita), since its establishment in 1946.

== First round proper ==
Crvena Zvezda - Vojvodina Novi Sad 2–0

FK Bor - Napredak Krusevac 2–1

Lovcen Cetinje - Dinamo Zagreb 1–2

Olimpija Ljubljana - OFK Beograd 1-2aet

Rijeka - Hajduk Split 3-2aet

Sloboda Tuzla - Dubocica Leskovac 1–0

Vardar Skopje - Radnicki Kragujevac 0–2

Velez Mostar - Osijek 5–0

== Quarter-finals ==
Crvena Zvezda - FK Bor 2–0

Dinamo Zagreb - Radnicki Kragujevac 2–0

OFK Beograd - Sloboda Tuzla 1–2

Velez Mostar - Rijeka 6–1

== Semi-finals ==
Crvena Zvezda - Velez Mostar 4–0

Sloboda Tuzla - Dinamo Zagreb 1–0

== Final ==
=== First leg ===
12 May 1971

Sloboda Tuzla	0–4	Red Star
		Džajić 39', 53'; Filipović 44'; Karasi 65'

Tušanj, Tuzla
Attendance: 7,000
Referee: Ratko Čanak (Belgrade)

SLOBODA TUZLA:
GK	1	(Socialist Federal Republic of Yugoslavia) Rizah Mešković
FW	2	(Socialist Federal Republic of Yugoslavia) Aleksandar Miličić
DF	3	(Socialist Federal Republic of Yugoslavia) Radomir Jovičić
MF	4	(Socialist Federal Republic of Yugoslavia) Fahrudin Avdičević
DF	5	(Socialist Federal Republic of Yugoslavia) Faruk Pašić
DF	6	(Socialist Federal Republic of Yugoslavia) Jusuf Hatunić
FW	7	(Socialist Federal Republic of Yugoslavia) Muhamed Glavović	Substituted off
MF	8	(Socialist Federal Republic of Yugoslavia) Časlav Jevremović	Substituted off
DF	9	(Socialist Federal Republic of Yugoslavia) Omer Jusić
MF	10	(Socialist Federal Republic of Yugoslavia) Mustafa Hukić
MF	11	(Socialist Federal Republic of Yugoslavia) Dušan Jovanović
Substitutes:
	?	(Socialist Federal Republic of Yugoslavia) Tihomir Trifunović	Substituted on
MF	?	(Socialist Federal Republic of Yugoslavia) Fuad Mulahasanović	Substituted on
Manager:
(Socialist Federal Republic of Yugoslavia) Josip Duvančić

RED STAR:
GK	1	(Socialist Federal Republic of Yugoslavia) Ratomir Dujković
DF	2	(Socialist Federal Republic of Yugoslavia) Branko Klenkovski
DF	3	(Socialist Federal Republic of Yugoslavia) Petar Krivokuća
DF	4	(Socialist Federal Republic of Yugoslavia) Zoran Antonijević
DF	5	(Socialist Federal Republic of Yugoslavia) Miroslav Pavlović	Substituted off
DF	6	(Socialist Federal Republic of Yugoslavia) Vladislav Bogićević
MF	7	(Socialist Federal Republic of Yugoslavia) Slobodan Janković	Substituted off
MF	8	(Socialist Federal Republic of Yugoslavia) Stanislav Karasi
FW	9	(Socialist Federal Republic of Yugoslavia) Zoran Filipović
DF	10	(Socialist Federal Republic of Yugoslavia) Jovan Aćimović
MF	11	(Socialist Federal Republic of Yugoslavia) Dragan Džajić
Substitutes:
	?	(Socialist Federal Republic of Yugoslavia) Mihalj Keri	Substituted on
	?	(Socialist Federal Republic of Yugoslavia) Mile Novković	Substituted on
Manager:
(Socialist Federal Republic of Yugoslavia) Miljan Miljanić

=== Second leg ===
26 May 1971

Red Star	2–0	Sloboda Tuzla
Janković 29'; Filipović 80'

Red Star Stadium, Belgrade
Attendance: 6,000
Referee: Petar Kostovski (Skopje)

RED STAR:
GK	1	(Socialist Federal Republic of Yugoslavia) Ratomir Dujković
DF	2	(Socialist Federal Republic of Yugoslavia) Branko Klenkovski
DF	3	(Socialist Federal Republic of Yugoslavia) Petar Krivokuća
DF	4	(Socialist Federal Republic of Yugoslavia) Zoran Antonijević
DF	5	(Socialist Federal Republic of Yugoslavia) Miroslav Pavlović
DF	6	(Socialist Federal Republic of Yugoslavia) Vladislav Bogićević
MF	7	(Socialist Federal Republic of Yugoslavia) Slobodan Janković	Substituted off
MF	8	(Socialist Federal Republic of Yugoslavia) Stevan Ostojić	Substituted off
FW	9	(Socialist Federal Republic of Yugoslavia) Zoran Filipović
DF	10	(Socialist Federal Republic of Yugoslavia) Jovan Aćimović
MF	11	(Socialist Federal Republic of Yugoslavia) Stanislav Karasi	Substituted off
Substitutes:
	?	(Socialist Federal Republic of Yugoslavia) Trifun Mihajlović	Substituted on
MF	?	(Socialist Federal Republic of Yugoslavia) Dragan Džajić	Substituted on
Manager:
(Socialist Federal Republic of Yugoslavia) Miljan Miljanić

SLOBODA TUZLA:
GK	1	(Socialist Federal Republic of Yugoslavia) Rizah Mešković
FW	2	(Socialist Federal Republic of Yugoslavia) Aleksandar Miličić
DF	3	(Socialist Federal Republic of Yugoslavia) Radomir Jovičić
MF	4	(Socialist Federal Republic of Yugoslavia) Fahrudin Avdičević
DF	5	(Socialist Federal Republic of Yugoslavia) Faruk Pašić
DF	6	(Socialist Federal Republic of Yugoslavia) Đorđe Gerum
MF	7	(Socialist Federal Republic of Yugoslavia) Dušan Jovanović	Substituted off
MF	8	(Socialist Federal Republic of Yugoslavia) Fuad Subašić
DF	9	(Socialist Federal Republic of Yugoslavia) Omer Jusić	Substituted off
	10	(Socialist Federal Republic of Yugoslavia) Tihomir Trifunović
	11	(Socialist Federal Republic of Yugoslavia) Časlav Jevremović
Substitutes:
	?	(Socialist Federal Republic of Yugoslavia) Alberto Altarac	Substituted on
	?	(Socialist Federal Republic of Yugoslavia) Muhamed Glavović	Substituted on
Manager:
(Socialist Federal Republic of Yugoslavia) Josip Duvančić

== See also ==
- 1970–71 Yugoslav First League
- 1970–71 Yugoslav Second League
