= List of FK Mačva Šabac managers =

FK Mačva Šabac is a professional football club based in Šabac, Serbia.

== Managers ==
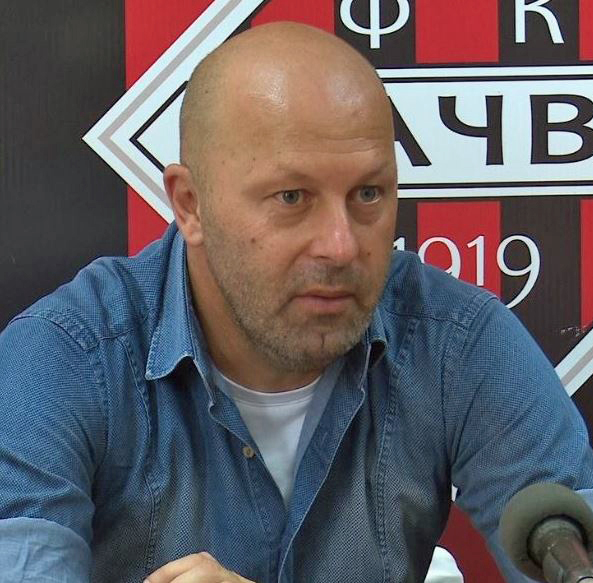
Dragan Aničić

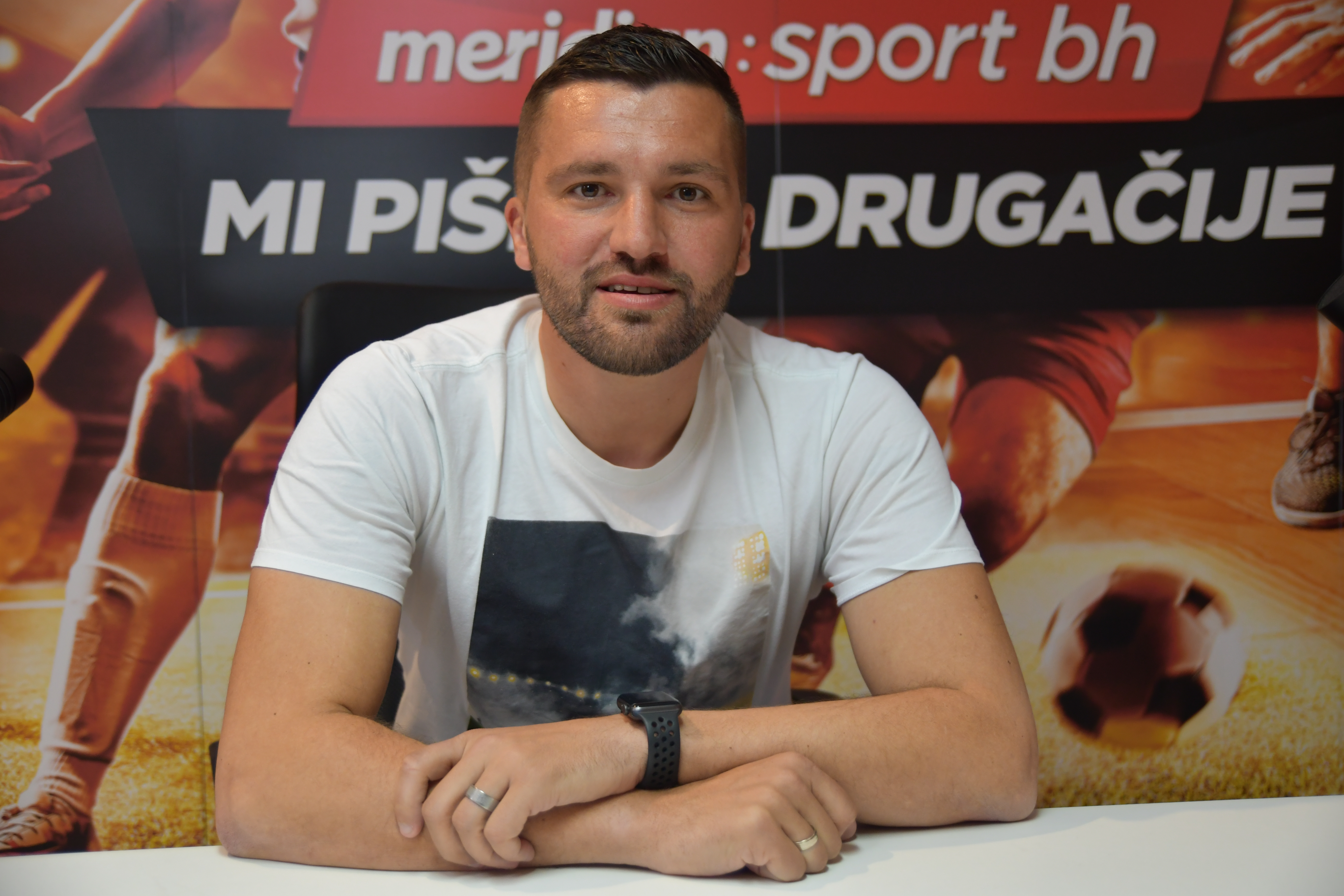
Boris Savić

Name	Period		Pld	W	D	L	Win %	Honours
Name	From	To	Pld	W	D	L	Win %	Honours
(Austria) Otto Fischer	February 1931							
(Socialist Federal Republic of Yugoslavia) Stevan Vilotić								
(Socialist Federal Republic of Yugoslavia) Sava Stefanović								
(Socialist Federal Republic of Yugoslavia) Božidar Pajević	July 1973							
(Socialist Federal Republic of Yugoslavia) Dimitrije Stefanović								
(Socialist Federal Republic of Yugoslavia) Vojislav Melić								
(Socialist Federal Republic of Yugoslavia) Selimir Milošević								
(Socialist Federal Republic of Yugoslavia) Dragan Popadić	1988	1988						
(Socialist Federal Republic of Yugoslavia) Ivan Golac	1988	January 1989						
(Socialist Federal Republic of Yugoslavia) Boris Marović	January 1989	1989						
(Socialist Federal Republic of Yugoslavia) Salko Eganović	1989							
(Socialist Federal Republic of Yugoslavia) Selimir Milošević								
(Federal Republic of Yugoslavia) Aleksandar Miličić								
(Federal Republic of Yugoslavia) Ivan Golac	April 1993	1993						
(Federal Republic of Yugoslavia) Aleksandar Miličić								
(Serbia and Montenegro) Slobodan Kustudić								
(Serbia and Montenegro) Milan Đuričić	2004	2004						
(Serbia and Montenegro) Momčilo Raičević								
(Serbia and Montenegro) Duško Prijić		2006						
(Serbia) Milan Đuričić	2006							
(Serbia) Slobodan Kustudić		2007						
(Serbia) Dragoslav Kostić								
(Serbia) Slobodan Milinković	September 2008	September 2010						
(North Macedonia) Jane Gavalovski	September 2010	October 2012						
(Serbia) Slobodan Milinković	October 2012	April 2013						
(Serbia) Dejan Vilotić	April 2013	2013						
(Serbia) Dejan Nikolić	July 2013	August 2014						2013–14 Serbian League West
(Serbia) Momčilo Raičević	August 2014	March 2015						
(Bosnia and Herzegovina) Vlado Čapljić	March 2015	April 2015						
(Serbia) Predrag Rogan	July 2015	January 2017						2015–16 Serbian League West
(Serbia) Dragan Aničić	January 2017	October 2018						2016–17 Serbian First League
(Serbia) Dragoslav Kostić (caretaker)	October 2018	October 2018						
(Serbia) Darko Tešović	October 2018	August 2019						
(Serbia) Marko Mićović (caretaker)	August 2019	2019						
(Serbia) Dragan Aničić	September 2019	December 2020						
(Serbia) Dragoslav Kostić (caretaker)	December 2020	December 2020						
(Montenegro) Slaviša Jelić (Slovenia) Alfred Jermaniš	January 2021	May 2021						
(Slovenia) Alfred Jermaniš	May 2021	May 2021						
(Bosnia and Herzegovina) Boris Savić	May 2021	March 2022						
(Serbia) Milan Milanović	March 2022	May 2022						
(Serbia) Filip Pejović (caretaker)	May 2022	May 2022						
(Serbia) Ivan Kurtušić	June 2022	January 2024						
(Serbia) Nemanja Glušica	January 2024							
