= Lazar Jovanović (writer) =

Manuscript writer

- Лазар Јовановић
- Born: Plakalovići, Vlasenica, Eyalet of Bosnia, Ottoman Empire
- Died: unknown
- Occupations: teacher, writer
- Writing career
- Language: Serbian, Church Slavonic
- Years active: 1835–1853
- Notable works: Sobornik ili sovjetnik majstora esnafa kujundžiskoga (1841); Epistolija (1842)

Lazar Jovanović (Serbian Cyrillic: Лазар Јовановић, fl. 1835–1853) was a Bosnian Serb manuscript writer from the first half of the 19th century. He worked as a teacher at Serb elementary schools in Tešanj and Tuzla, in the north-east of the Ottoman province of Bosnia. He wrote, illuminated and bound two books in 1841 and 1842. The first book was commissioned by Serb members of the guild of goldsmiths in Sarajevo. It contains a collection of advice to be presented to journeymen on the ceremony of their promotion to master craftsmen. His second book contains a version of the apocryphal epistle known as the Epistle of Christ from Heaven. Although Jovanović states that he writes in Slavonic-Serbian (a literary language blending Church Slavonic, vernacular Serbian and Russian elements), the language of his books is basically vernacular Serbian of the Ijekavian accent. He follows traditional Church Slavonic orthography, rather than the reformed Serbian Cyrillic introduced in 1818.

== Life and work ==
Lazar Jovanović was born in the village of Plakalovići in the district of Vlasenica, in the east of the Ottoman province of Bosnia. His original family name was Plakalović, which he later changed to Jovanović after his father's name, Jovan. He was in Sarajevo in the service of the Orthodox Metropolitan of Dabar-Bosna Venijamin at latest until 1834. He probably went to school while in Sarajevo, and his job at the metropolitan residence was to prepare coffee.

By 1835 Jovanović had taken the teaching position at the Serb elementary school in Tešanj; he is the first known teacher of this school. (Note: A later teacher of the Serb school in Tešanj was Stevo Petranović, who founded an amateur theatre in this town and staged the first modern plays to be performed in Bosnia and Herzegovina, Judith by Hebbel in 1865 and The Robbers by Schiller in 1866.) While the majority population of Tešanj were Muslims, it had a Serb quarter (Srpska varoš) that developed in the 18th century. Wealthy Serb merchants living in it financially supported the school and the Orthodox church in the town. Sometime between 1843 and 1847, he went on pilgrimage to Jerusalem and consequently prefixed the title Hadži to his name. During that period he also moved to Tuzla, the main city in north-eastern Bosnia. Beside being a teacher at the Serb school there, he was also employed by a pasha as his personal physician. Many of the physicians recorded in the retinues of Ottoman dignitaries in Bosnia had a questionable level of medical education; they hailed from various countries and regions.

Ѡбнови ѡву книгу хаћи Лазаръ Їѡанновићъ уч: туз: назыратєлъ сколє и єћимъбаша пашинъ. У Тузли мѣсєца їулия 7го днє на 1847 лѣта.
— "This book was renovated by Hadži Lazar Jovanović, the Tuzla teacher, school supervisor, and pasha's physician-in-chief. In Tuzla, in the month of July, on the 7th day, in the year 1847."

— Final part of an inscription in a Gospel Book in the Lomnica Monastery

Jovanović created his first known manuscript work in 1839. It was a čitulja, an obituary booklet containing names of deceased members of a family to be mentioned by a priest at church services. By 1843 he had written, bound and modestly illuminated five such booklets, ordered by people from Tešanj, his home village and two neighbouring villages. Three of them were kept at the Lomnica Monastery, located near his home village. He also rebound three old liturgical books from this monastery (in 1840 and 1847), a book from the Ozren Monastery (in 1841), and two books from the Church of Saint John the Baptist in Zvornik (in 1853). These books were printed in the 18th century, three of them in Moscow and one in Vienna. In each of them, Jovanović wrote inscriptions that included some facts about him. He reportedly signed himself in a lost book as the secretary to the Orthodox Metropolitan of Zvornik and Tuzla, Agatangel.

In 1841 Jovanović wrote, illuminated and bound his first book, which was commissioned by Serb members of the guild of goldsmiths in Sarajevo. In this manuscript, Jovanović collected advice that was presented to journeymen on the ceremony of their promotion as master craftsmen. It is one of only two such texts known today. In 1842 Jovanović created his second book, which was commissioned by the Church of the Annunciation in the village of Osječani in the Doboj area. This book presents a version of the apocryphal epistle known variously as the Epistle of Christ from Heaven.

By the standards of his time and surroundings, Jovanović was a very literate person. Although he wrote only two small books, his work is significant, especially considering that a relatively small number of manuscripts are known to have been written by Serbs in Ottoman Bosnia. The first printing press in this territory, founded by a Serb merchant, ceased to work in 1523, and the next would not appear until 1866.

== Books ==
=== Sobornik ===
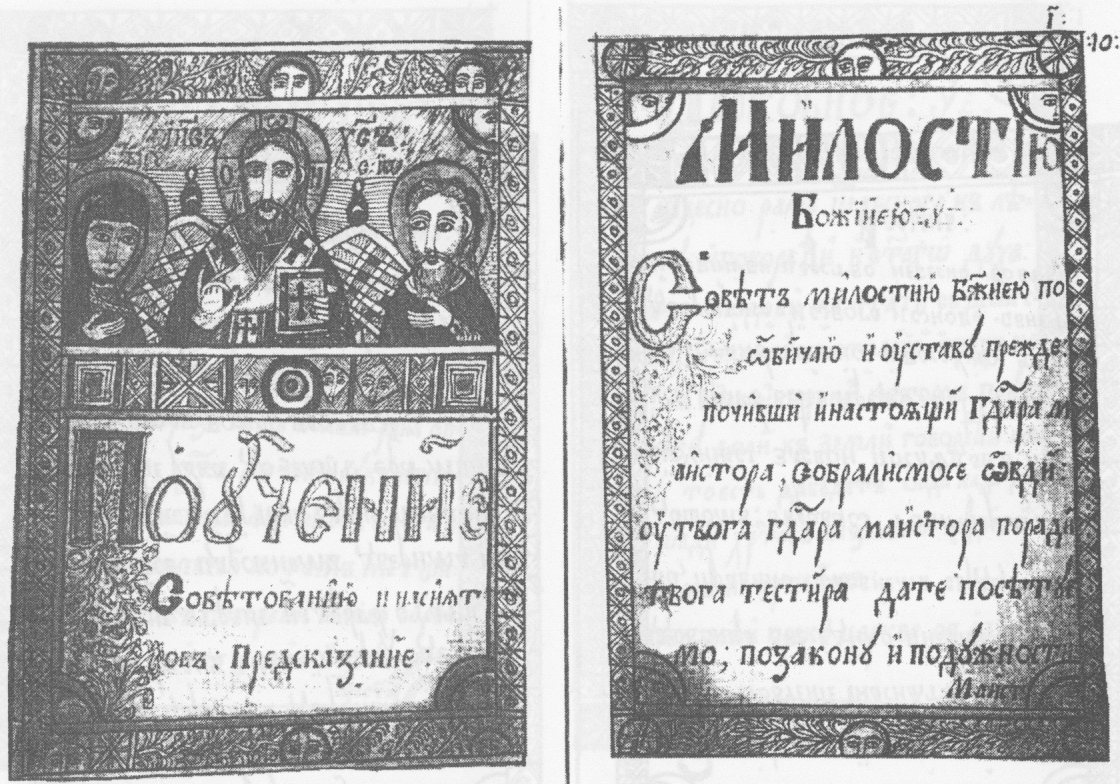
Sobornik, folios 12v–13r (black-and-white reprint)

Lazar Jovanović's 1841 book is referred to in literature as Sobornik ili sovjetnik majstora esnafa kujundžiskoga (Cyrillic: Соборник или совјетник мајстора еснафа кујунџискога, Collection or Advisory for the Masters of the Guild of Goldsmiths), as he approximately refers to it in the first two pages. It is kept in Belgrade in the Library of the National Museum of Serbia, in its collection of old and rare books (Rr 1). The manuscript was commissioned by Serb members of the guild of goldsmiths in Sarajevo, and Jovanović wrote it in Tešanj. The guild had a ceremony called testir, in which a journeyman (kalfa) was promoted to a master craftsman (majstor) and a full member of the guild. This ceremony included a presentation of various advice to the future master, and Jovanović collected it in Sobornik. A particular guild in Sarajevo could include people belonging to different religions, Muslims, Orthodox Christians, Catholics, and Jews. Orthodox Serb members of a guild celebrated annually their slava, the patron saint of their guild. The testir ceremony had a religious component, and it could be held at the house of the master who trained the journeyman to be promoted. Periodically, all members of a guild had an outdoor party outside Sarajevo at which a number of apprentices and journeymen were simultaneously promoted to journeymen and master craftsmen, respectively.

Sobornik is written on paper and contains 60 leaves and a front flyleaf. The size of the leaves is 155 by 116 millimetres, while the size of the text columns is 145 by 102 millimetres, with usually 11 to 13 lines per page. Normal text is written in black ink, and the headings in red. The covers are made of wooden boards coated with leather of dark wine colour, measuring 160 by 120 millimetres. Folios 2v–3r and 31v–60v were left empty by the writer, but f. 31v–32v and 60r, as well as the flyleaf, contain inscriptions by the patrons of the manuscript.

The central section of the book (f. 12v–25r) directly addresses the future master, often calling him "dear brother" (драги братє). Its heading implies that it was composed on the basis of some earlier text, whether written or orally transmitted. It contains a series of moral advice, supplemented with corresponding Bible passages. Beside general advice of piety, hard working, righteousness, honesty, respectfulness, spiritual and physical purity, charity, temperance, etc., it more specifically calls for loyalty and obedience to the guild. It ends with a prayer for the living and deceased members of the guild. A short section about truthfulness is given in f. 28r–28v. Preceding the central section are instructions on proper behaviour in a church and correct performance of ritual gestures there. The book also contains hymns to Saints Constantine and Helena, the patrons (slava) of the guild of goldsmiths, as well as hymns to archangels Michael and Gabriel, the patrons of the Old Orthodox Church in Sarajevo. The book is illustrated with a headpiece representing the archangels (f. 1r), a whole-page miniature with standing figures of Saints Constantine and Helena (f. 3v), a headpiece depicting the Deesis (f. 12v), a tailpiece (f. 25r), and a whole-page miniature showing Saint Nicholas in the upper part and the archangels below (f. 25v).

Зло є слагати ама нїє зло съ малиїмъ зломъ ѿ вєликога зла оутєћи.
— "It is bad to tell a lie, but it is not bad to escape from a great evil by means of a small evil."

Ми смо на ѡвомъ свиєту каѡ на єдномъ заиму илї каѡ роса на лїсту ... каѡ єданъ цвиєтъ: данасъ єсть а шютра ниє.
— "We are in this world as on a loan or as dew on a leaf ... as a flower: today it is and tomorrow it is not."

— Sobornik, folios 23r & 28r.

Jovanović states (f. 1r) that he writes in Slavonic-Serbian (a literary language blending Church Slavonic, vernacular Serbian and Russian elements), but the book is written basically in vernacular Serbian of the Ijekavian accent. Church Slavonic influences can be seen in phonology and, to a lesser degree, in morphology. These influences come from both the Serbian and the Russian recensions of Church Slavonic. Only the hymns, taken from liturgical books, are written purely in Church Slavonic. The script is half-uncial Cyrillic with a loose orthography, though generally following Church Slavonic conventions. The letters look archaic, though an influence of printed books can be seen in their shaping. The letter ѣ (named yat, transliterated as ě) is mostly replaced with иє (i.e.), reflecting the Ijekavian reflex of the Proto-Slavic vowel designated by ѣ.

Inscriptions in Sobornik name the guild members who engaged Jovanović to write it: Nikola Gabelić, Teodor Mijić, Staniša Vasilijević, Periša Smiljanić, and Andrija. (Note: Staniša Vasilijević was the čauš (lieutenant) of the guild in 1816; this position was usually held by a younger man of Orthodox faith. Periša Smiljanić was in 1855 a klisara, a member of the Church Committee in Sarajevo. Teodor Mijić is signed as the creator of the silver overlay of an icon in the Old Orthodox Church, made in 1826. Members of the Gabelić (or Gabela) family had occupied prominent positions in the guild since 1766.) They paid him 57 piastres and 20 paras for it, which corresponded to a monthly salary of a teacher at the Serb school in Sarajevo. An 1846 document of the guild mentions a "book of advice" (книга одъ насията). In 1852, Georgije Mijić wrote a text in f. 31v–32v by which nine members of the guild confirmed the validity of Sobornik and supplemented it with a couple of guild rules. The book was still in possession of the guild in 1902, when it was first mentioned in literature, in an article by Vladislav Skarić. In 1954 a person sold it to the National Museum of Serbia. Sobornik is one of only two such advisories known today. The other advisory was composed for the Serb members of the guild of tailors and published in 1869 by the Vilayet Printing House in Sarajevo, as part of a calendar. There are many similarities between the two texts, but there are also differences. Sobornik lacks concrete guild rules, which are found in the 1869 text, while the latter lacks instructions on proper behaviour in a church and liturgical hymns. It was printed in the reformed Serbian Cyrillic (introduced in 1818).

=== Epistolija ===
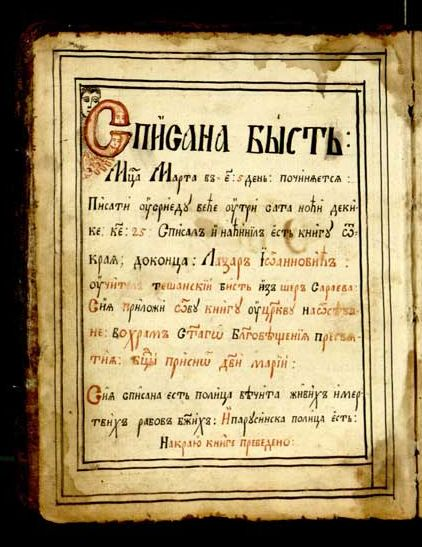
Epistolija, folio 1 verso, containing Jovanović's declaration of authorship

Lazar Jovanović's 1842 book is referred to in literature as Epistolija (Cyrillic: Епистолија), and it is kept in Belgrade in the National Library of Serbia, in its collection of old and rare books (Rs 97). The manuscript was commissioned by the Church of the Annunciation in the village of Osječani in the Doboj area, and Jovanović wrote it in Tešanj. It contains a version of an apocryphal epistle known by various names, such as the Epistle of Christ from Heaven. This epistle is found in a great number of versions written in many languages within traditions of both Eastern and Western Christianity. (Note: A short version of the epistle, originated in England, appeared in the Chicago Evening Post in 1917.) It was first mentioned in AD 584 in a letter by Licinian, the Bishop of Cartagena (in the Byzantine part of Spain), in which he strongly condemned it. The epistle claims to have been written by Jesus Christ or God and descended from heaven, usually to Rome or Jerusalem. It curses those who doubt its divine origin, and promises benefits to those who copy and spread it further or read it in public. It could also be used as a personal or household amulet. Eastern Church authorities were not unanimous in its condemnation, and there are indications that it was sometimes read at church services.

Epistolija is written on paper and contains 30 leaves measuring 200 by 155 millimetres, while the size of the text columns is 130 by 120 millimetres, with 12 to 14 lines per page. The covers are made of wooden boards coated with dark brown leather, measuring 205 by 160 millimetres. Normal text is written in black ink, and the headings in red. Folios 2r, 20v–23v, 26r–29v and 30v were left empty by the writer, but some of these leaves contain later inscriptions.

In Epistolija, the text of the epistle is preceded by an introductory section, a kind of abstract, titled "Edification of the Serb People" (Поучєниє народа србскога). The epistle itself begins in f. 5r with the account of how God sent it from heaven enclosed in a stone that fell near Jerusalem. The stone was small, but nobody could lift it. After Saint Peter and the Patriarch of Jerusalem prayed with bishops, monks and priests before the stone for three days and nights, it opened up and the letter within it was taken to a church and read before the congregation. The text of the letter is then presented, after which the narrative returns to the congregation, who piously engage in the copying and spreading of the letter throughout the whole land. Some versions of the epistle present only the letter without the framing stories. The letter contains condemnations of various kinds of sins, disregard for precepts of the Church, and bad conduct, depicting vividly the harsh punishments for these transgressions. It especially focuses on the strict observation of Sunday as the Lord's Day. The epistle ends in f. 19v, and the remaining leaves of the book were reserved for writing the names of persons to be prayed for at services in the Osječani church. Already Jovanović had written about sixty names, mostly in the section "Memory Eternal of the Deceased Servants of God". The book is illustrated with two headpieces, one representing Jesus Christ (f. 3r) and the other depicting the Deesis (f. 5r).

Characteristics of the language and script of Epistolija are similar to those of Jovanović's previous book, Sobornik. It is unknown for how long Epistolija remained in the church in Osječani. It was later kept in the village of Kožuhe, also in the Doboj area. One of its owners in Kožuhe was priest Đorđe Stefanović, the brother of an organiser of the 1858 Serb revolt against the Ottomans in that area, priest Jaćim Stefanović. In 1940 it was in Tuzla, and Petar N. Jovanović, the protopope of Tuzla, wrote a historical note about Jaćim Stefanović (f. 26v). The next year began World War II in Yugoslavia, and the book was brought to Belgrade. An unknown person gave it to the National Library of Serbia in 1943. Beside Jovanović's Epistolija, there are other instances of the Epistle of Christ from Heaven written by Serb scribes. Each of them has its peculiarities regarding the contents, orthography, and the relationship between Church Slavonic and vernacular Serbian elements in it. One of them, written in the early 18th century and showing traces of the Ijekavian accent, shares with Epistolija the condemnation of tobacco smokers. In both manuscripts, they are referred to as "those who drink tobacco".

== Sources ==
- Ćurić, Hajrudin (1958). "Školstvo u sjeveroistočnoj Bosni posljednjih decenija turske vladavine" [Schools in North-Eastern Bosnia in the Last Decades of Turkish Rule] (PDF). Članci i građa za kulturnu istoriju istočne Bosne (in Serbo-Croatian). 2. Tuzla: Muzej istočne Bosne. ISSN 0578-4123.
- Filipović, Milenko S. (1950). "Стари српски записи и натписи из североисточне Босне" [Old Serb Inscriptions and Superscriptions from North-Eastern Bosnia]. Spomenik (in Serbian). 99. Belgrade: Serbian Academy of Sciences. OCLC 470121283.
- Goodspeed, Edgar J. (1931). "The Letter of Jesus Christ". Strange New Gospels. Chicago: University of Chicago Press. OCLC 814329.
- Gošić, Nevenka (1997). "Рукописна књига учитеља Лазара Јовановића (1842. г)" [Manuscript Book of the Teacher Lazar Jovanović (1842)]. Arheografski prilozi (Mélanges archéographiques) (in Serbian). 19. Belgrade: National Library of Serbia. ISSN 0351-2819.
- Jovanović, Tomislav (2004). "Епистола о недељи у српским преписима" [Epistle about Sunday in Serbian Transcriptions]. Arheografski prilozi (Mélanges archéographiques) (in Serbian). 26–27. Belgrade: National Library of Serbia. ISSN 0351-2819.
- Kreševljaković, Hamdija (1920). "Štamparije u Bosni za turskog vremena 1529.–1878" [Printing Houses in Bosnia in Turkish Times 1529–1878]. Građa za povijest književnosti hrvatske (in Croatian). 9. Zagreb: Yugoslav Academy of Sciences and Arts.
- Lovrenović, Ivan (2001). Bosnia: A Cultural History. London: Saqi Books. ISBN 978-0-8147-5179-4.
- Marković, Marko (1953). "Прве савремене позоришне претставе у Босни и Херцеговини" [First Modern Theatrical Plays in Bosnia and Herzegovina]. Život: Mjesečni časopis za književnost i kulturu (in Serbo-Croatian). 2 (7). Sarajevo: Udruženje književnika Bosne i Hercegovine. ISSN 0514-776X.
- Miceli, Calogero A. (2016). "The Epistle of Christ from Heaven". In Tony Burke; Brent Landau (eds.). New Testament Apocrypha: More Noncanonical Scriptures. Vol. 1. Grand Rapids, Michigan: William B. Eerdmans Publishing Company. ISBN 978-0-8028-7289-0.
- Milenković, Svetlana; Vasiljev, Ljupka (2002). "Још једна рукописна књига Лазара Јовановића, тешањског учитеља" [Another Manuscript Book by Lazar Jovanović, Teacher from Tešanj]. Arheografski prilozi (Mélanges archéographiques) (in Serbian). 24. Belgrade: National Library of Serbia. ISSN 0351-2819.
- Momirović, Petar (1955). "Прилог проучавању сарајевских кујунџија" [Contribution to the Study of Sarajevo Goldsmiths]. Prilozi Za Orijentalnu Filologiju (in Serbian). 5. Sarajevo: Orijentalni institut. ISSN 0555-1153.
- Stanojević, Vladimir (1953). Историја медицине [History of Medicine] (in Serbo-Croatian). Belgrade & Zagreb: Medicinska knjiga. OCLC 916960970.
- Tkachenko, Aleksandr A.; Turilov, Anatoly A. (2013). "Епистолия од неделе" [Epistle of Sunday]. Православная энциклопедия (in Russian). Church Research Centre "Orthodox Encyclopedia".
