= Altarac =

Altarac is a surname. Notable people with the surname include:

- Alberto Altarac, Bosnian footballer
- Želimir Altarac Čičak (1947–2021), Bosnian singer-songwriter
