= Fuad Subašić =

Bosnian footballer

Personal information
- Date of birth: 17 May 1948 (age 78)
- Place of birth: Živinice, SFR Yugoslavia
- Position: Midfielder

Senior career*
Years	Team	Apps	(Gls)
1963–1967	Slaven Živinice		
1967–1974	Sloboda Tuzla	52	(3)
1974	Toronto Croatia		
1974–1977	Radnik Bijeljina		
- * Club domestic league appearances and goals

Fuad Subašić (born May 17, 1948) is a Bosnian former footballer who played as a midfielder.

== Career ==
Subašić played with NK Slaven Živinice in 1963. In 1967, he played in the Yugoslav Second League with FK Sloboda Tuzla, and assisted in securing promotion to the Yugoslav First League in 1969. He featured in the 1970–71 Yugoslav Cup final, but lost the series to Red Star Belgrade. In the summer of 1974 he played abroad in the National Soccer League with Toronto Croatia. In the fall of 1974 he played with FK Radnik Bijeljina.
