= Kurtćehajić =

Kurtćehajić is a Bosniak surname found in Bijelo Polje, Montenegro. Its bearers are ethnic Bosniaks. It may refer to:

- Mehmed Šakir Kurtćehajić (1844–1872), first Bosniak journalist
- Senad Kurtćehajić (1966), Mechanical engineer; Head of the center for verification of measuring instruments (Ministry of Energy, Mining and Industry)
- Suad Kurtćehajić (1962), Professor at the Faculty of Political Sciences at the University of Sarajevo; President of the Bosnian Academy of Sciences and Arts Kulin ban
