= Alberto Altarac =

Bosnian footballer

Personal information
- Place of birth: SFR Yugoslavia
- Position: Midfielder

Senior career*
Years	Team	Apps	(Gls)
1969–1974	Sloboda Tuzla	20	(0)
1974	Toronto Croatia		

International career
1966–1967	Yugoslavia U18	8	(0)
- * Club domestic league appearances and goals

Alberto Altarac is a Bosnian former footballer who played as a midfielder.

== Career ==
Altarac played in the Yugoslav Second League in 1969 with FK Sloboda Tuzla, and assisted in securing promotion to the Yugoslav First League. He featured in the 1970–71 Yugoslav Cup final, but lost the series to Red Star Belgrade. In 1974, he played in the National Soccer League with Toronto Croatia.

After his football career he worked as an Italian translator.

== International career ==
Altarac played in 1966 with the Yugoslavia national under-18 football team, and featured in the 1966 UEFA European Under-18 Championship.
