= Ignjat Sopron =

Serbian journalist and publisher

- Born: Ignaz Karl Soppron; 1821; Novi Sad
- Died: 1894 (aged 72–73)
- Occupations: journalist, publisher, and printer

Ignaz Karl Soppron (1821–1894), better known as Ignjat Sopron (Serbian Cyrillic: Игњат Сопрон), was a journalist, publisher, and printer from Zemun (then part of the Austrian Empire and Austria-Hungary, today one of the municipalities of Belgrade, Serbia).

== Biography ==
Born in Novi Sad to an ethnic German family, he learned the art of printing in his hometown, and later in Pest and Vienna. He worked for the Viennese daily newspaper Fremden-Blatt and attended lectures at the University of Vienna. In 1851, he was given a concession to run the printing business in Zemun. He founded a printing house there, which produced books in Serbian, German, Bulgarian, and Greek. In 1852–53, it also issued a newspaper, Srbsko-narodni vestnik (Србско-народни вестник, "Serbian National Herald"). Sopron accepted the offer of the government of the Ottoman Vilayet of Bosnia to set up the vilayet's official printing house in Sarajevo, and Sopron's Printing House was opened there in April 1866. He started and edited the first newspaper to be published in Bosnia and Herzegovina, Bosanski vjestnik (Босански вјестник, "Bosnian Herald"). Sopron remained in Sarajevo for a year, and having returned to Zemun, he started the newspaper Zemunski glasnik (Земунски гласник, "Zemun Herald"). He later started and edited two newspapers in German, Grenzbote (1870–76) and Semliner Wochenblatt (1880–94), though he kept his pro-Serb orientation. He published works of significant Serb writers, such as Petar II Petrović-Njegoš, Ljubomir Nenadović, Milovan Vidaković, Milica Stojadinović-Srpkinja, and Dositej Obradović. Sopron also wrote literary and historical works, mostly in German, but also in Serbian. With his monograph in German about the history of Zemun, Monographie von Semlin und Umgebung, Sopron became the most significant Zemun city historian.
