= Mićo Sokolović =

Mićo Sokolović (Serbian Cyrillic: Мићо Соколовић, 1883–1906) was the principal founder of the labour movement in Bosnia and Herzegovina. He worked as a bookbinder in Belgrade in the Kingdom of Serbia during 1903–05. He was active in the trade union of Serbian bookbinders and joined the Serbian Social Democratic Party. In May 1905, Sokolović returned to Bosnia and Herzegovina (under the rule of Austria-Hungary since 1878). He worked on organising the labour movement in Sarajevo, and under his guidance, the first trade union in Bosnia and Herzegovina was founded on 27 August 1905; it was named the General Workers' Union (Glavni radnički savez). He died of tuberculosis on 27 April 1906 in Sarajevo.

== Early life and activism in Serbia ==
Mićo Sokolović was born on 21 November 1883 in the village of Sokolovići in the Rogatica district of the Condominium of Bosnia and Herzegovina, ruled by Austria-Hungary. After elementary school, he entered the gymnasium in Sarajevo in 1896. There he completed the first three grades, before he lost his stipend. His father, an impoverished tailor, sent him in 1900 to Belgrade to learn the craft of bookbinding. In August 1903, he joined the trade union of bookbinders of the Kingdom of Serbia and soon became the secretary of this organisation. Shortly afterwards, he also joined the Serbian Social Democratic Party (SSDP). He was the delegate of the bookbinders' organisation at the third congress of Serbia's trade unions, held in March 1904. During the winter of 1903–04, Sokolović attended the newly founded Workers' School (Radnička škola) in Belgrade, which was started by Radovan Dragović. Dragović was one of the founders the SSDP and the first trade union in Serbia, the General Workers' Union (Glavni radnički savez). Dragović taught about the labour movement, and the goal of his school was to create efficient socialist agitators.

== Activism in Bosnia and Herzegovina ==
In Bosnia and Herzegovina, socialist ideas were first promoted in the 1860s by Bosnian Serb teacher, writer and activist Vasa Pelagić. At that time, near the end of centuries-long Ottoman rule, Bosnia and Herzegovina was a mostly agrarian and underdeveloped province. Its industrialisation began after it was occupied by Austria-Hungary in 1878. Many workers were imported to it from more developed parts of the empire. Some of them engaged in spreading socialist ideas in the province, but most of these workers were promptly expelled by Austro-Hungarian authorities, who were very vigilant against socialist agitation. Bosnia and Herzegovina's workers managed to establish their first organisations in 1903, in the form of mutual aid societies. The workers' demands for higher wages and better working conditions, and for the general improvement of their economic and social position, were much intensified during the spring and summer of 1905.

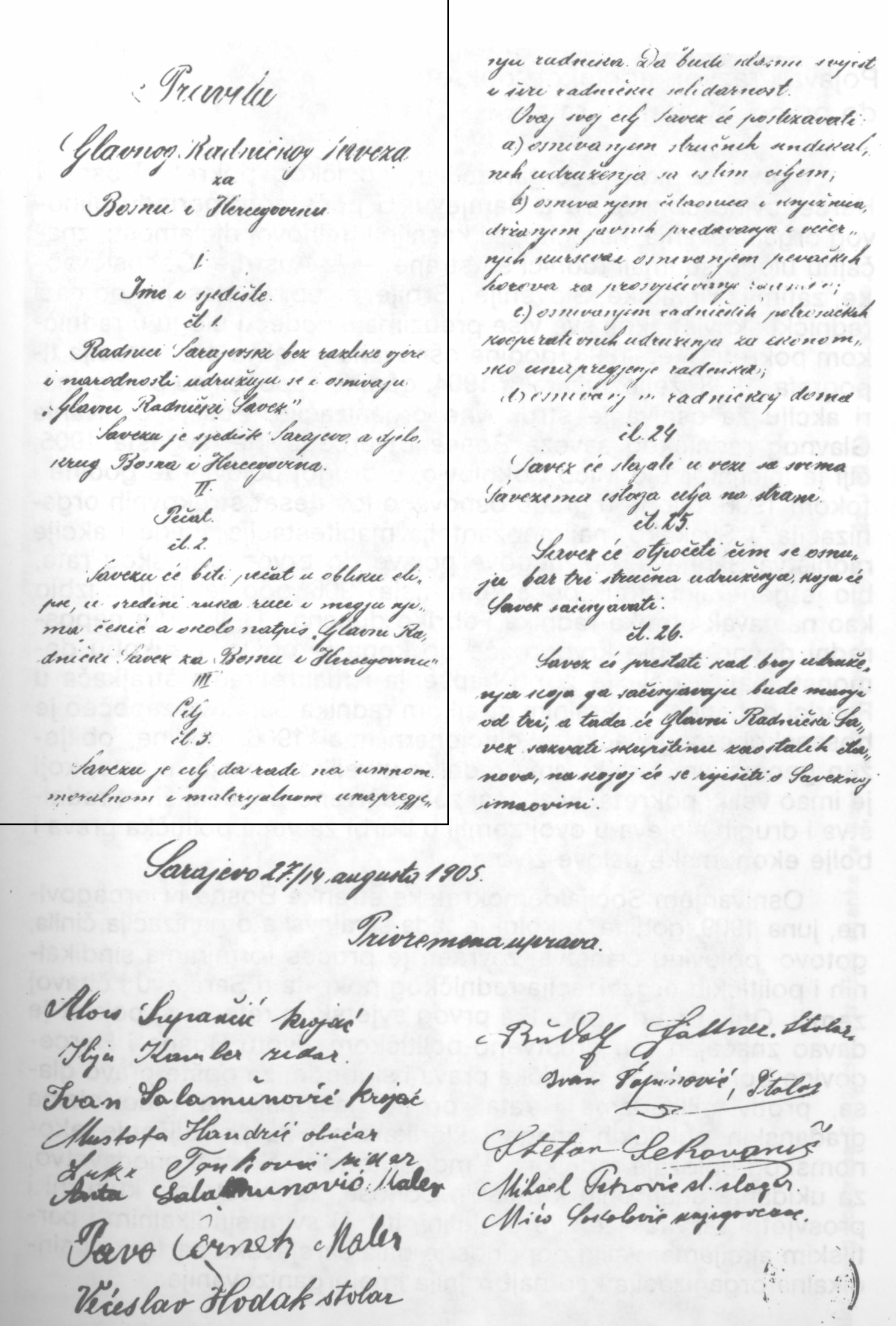
Part of the first page (upper left corner) and the last page of the original Rules of the General Workers' Union, with the names of the provisional management members

Sokolović returned to Sarajevo during that period and, on 22 May, became an employee of the National Printing House (founded in 1866 as Sopron's Printing House). At that time in Bosnia and Herzegovina, there were only isolated groups of workers who made efforts to improve their position, and they had vague and conflicting ideas of how to organise themselves. Sokolović began agitating in the printing house, and six weeks after he was employed there, its workers went on strike. For this success, Sokolović received a sentence of four days' imprisonment and the dismissal from his job. He then fully devoted himself to organising the labour movement in Sarajevo. On his initiative, representatives of workers of various trades gathered on 10 August 1905. They delivered a resolution, composed by Sokolović, requesting the city authorities to grant the workers the right of free association and of holding public meetings. After no response came from the authorities, Sokolović gathered the workers' representatives again on 21 August. They made a formal request to hold an assembly six days later to establish their organisation, and this request was soon granted.

The first public assembly of workers in Bosnia and Herzegovina was held as planned, on 27 August 1905; it had around 350 participants. The provincial government sent an envoy to be present at this gathering. It was presided by Alojz Supančič (a textile worker, originally from Slovenia), and its minutes were recorded by Sokolović and Mustafa Handžić (a shoemaker). The assembly accepted the proposition to found the General Workers' Union (Glavni radnički savez), the main goal of which was "to work on the intellectual, moral and material advancement of workers, to awaken their class consciousness, and to spread solidarity among them". The Rules of the General Workers' Union (Pravila Glavnog radničkog saveza), whose articles were composed by Sokolović, was also unanimously accepted. The assembly elected a provisional management of the organisation, with Ilija Kamber (a construction worker) as its president and Sokolović as its secretary. It was the first trade union to be founded in Bosnia and Herzegovina. Beside this general union, during September 1905 similar assemblies founded six trade unions organised along the lines of particular trades. All these organisations and their Rules had to be approved by the central Ministry of Finance in Vienna and the provincial government, which would take about a year. A more lenient attitude of the Austro-Hungarian government toward workers' demands and organisations resulted partly from their fear that something similar to the Russian Revolution of 1905 might happen in their empire. They saw that further repressive measures against organised workers might lead to a serious social and political unrest, but they sought to make the worker's organisations apolitical and to place them under their control.

Eight strikes were recorded in Bosnia and Herzegovina during 1905, and collective agreements appeared for the first time there. The labour movement of the province began connecting with that of other parts of Austria-Hungary, specifically Croatia and Slavonia. Sokolović and Martin Zrelec (a textile worker from Banja Luka, originally from Croatia) participated at the third congress of the Social Democratic Party of Croatia and Slavonia, held on 24–26 December 1905 in Zagreb. Sokolović delivered a speech, concluding it with the message:

Mogu da zatvaraju koliko hoće, ali pokreta ipak neće zapriječiti. Najvažniji je uspjeh, da se tim štrajkovima pokazalo vladi, da se radnici ne dadu više izrabljivati. S tim pokretima u Bosni i Hercegovini dobiva socijalizam nove borce i tim se na sve strane potkopava temelj kapitalističkog poretka da se sruši i da se podigne nova zgrada socijalizma.

They can imprison us as much as they want, but still they will not block the movement. The most important success is that these strikes have shown the government that the workers do not let themselves be exploited any more. With these movements in Bosnia and Herzegovina, socialism is receiving new fighters and the foundation of the capitalist order is thus being undermined on all sides, so that it collapses and that the new building of socialism is erected.

== Death and legacy ==
Sokolović was suffering from tuberculosis and his constant activities further impaired his health. Shortly after he returned from Zagreb, he had to retire to his sickbed. He died on 27 April 1906 in a hospital in Sarajevo, and his funeral was attended by a crowd of 3,000 workers. Three days after his funeral, on 2 May, began the first of a series of strikes that occurred throughout Bosnia and Herzegovina during May 1906. One of the strikers' demands was that the General Workers' Union be urgently approved. The Ministry of Finance in Vienna approved the organisation and its Rules, with some modifications, on 10 July 1906, and the provincial government gave its consent on 21 September. The constituent assembly of the General Workers' Union was held on 14 October, followed by the constituent assemblies of the six subordinate trade unions during the same month. In 1913, seventeen organisations were under the leadership of the general union, with nearly 6,000 active members. The Rules, composed by Sokolović, remained unchanged throughout its existence. Austro-Hungarian authorities abolished all trade unions in Bosnia and Herzegovina in May 1913.
