= Mustafa Hukić =

Bosnian footballer and manager (1951–1999)

Personal information
- Date of birth: 6 February 1951
- Place of birth: Tuzla, FPR Yugoslavia
- Date of death: 7 August 1999 (aged 48)
- Place of death: Lukavac, Bosnia and Herzegovina
- Position: Defender

Youth career
- 1960–1969: Sloboda Tuzla

Senior career*
Years	Team	Apps	(Gls)
1969–1978	Sloboda Tuzla	260	(25)
1978–1981	Osijek	78	(13)
1981	San Jose Earthquakes	12	(1)
1982	Sakaryaspor	1	(0)
1982–1983	Adana Demirspor	0	(0)
1983–1985	Sloboda Tuzla	21	(0)
Total		372	(39)

International career
1977	Yugoslavia	5	(0)

Managerial career
- 1994–1996: Sloboda Tuzla
- 1995–1997: Bosnia and Herzegovina (assistant)
- 1998–1999: Sloboda Tuzla
- * Club domestic league appearances and goals

Mustafa Hukić "Huka" (6 February 1951 – 7 August 1999) was a Bosnian professional football manager and former player.

== Club career ==
Hukić came through the youth ranks of hometown club Sloboda Tuzla and amassed a total of 25 goals in 281 league games for them. He made his senior debut for Sloboda in 1969 against Budućnost Titograd and played for them during the club's golden era, alongside players like Fuad Mulahasanović, Jusuf Hatunić, Ismet Hadžić, Nedžad Verlašević, Dževad Šećerbegović and Mersed Kovačević. He also played abroad in the NASL and in Turkey.

== International career ==
Hukić made his debut for Yugoslavia in a January 1977 friendly match away against Colombia and has earned a total of 5 caps, scoring no goals. All of his games were against Latin American opposition and his final international was a July 1977 friendly against Argentina.

== Death ==
Hukić died in a car accident on the road between Gračanica and Tuzla, aged 48.

== Honours ==
=== Player ===
Osijek

- Yugoslav Second League: 1980–81 (West)

Sloboda Tuzla

- UEFA Intertoto Cup: 1983 (Joint Winner)

=== Manager ===
Sloboda Tuzla

- Bosnian Cup runner-up: 1994–95, 1995–96
