= Lomnica Monastery =

Serbian Orthodox monastery near Šekovići, Bosnia and Herzegovina

Coordinates: 44.311805556°N 18.855416667°E

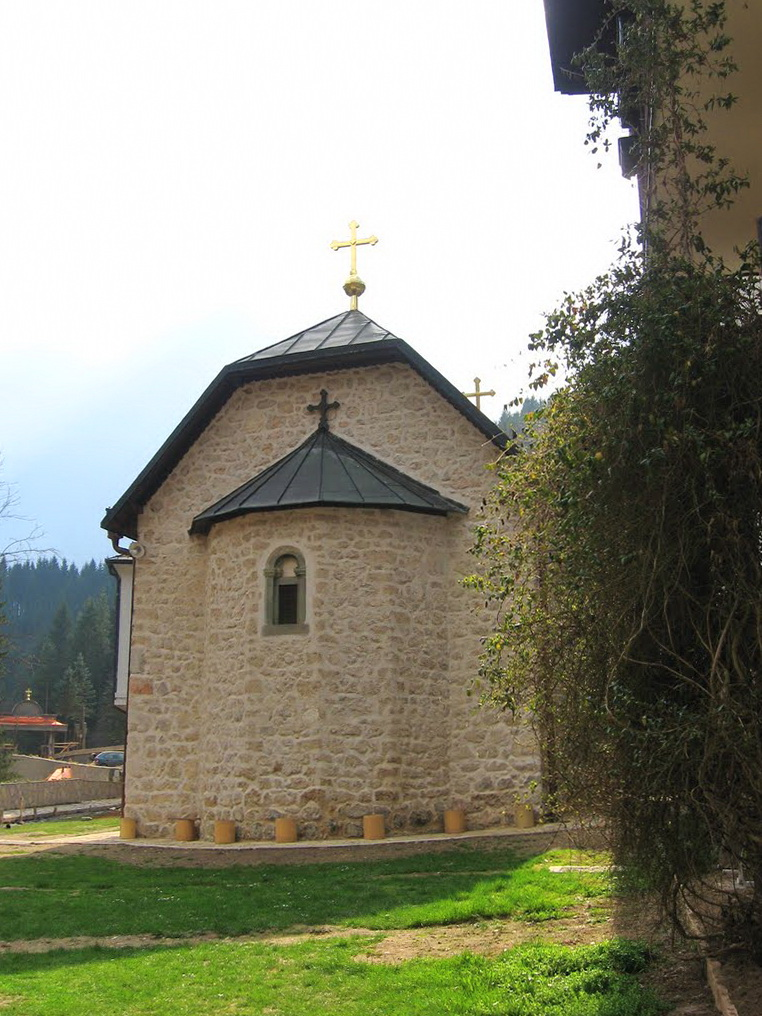
Church of the Lomnica Monastery viewed in the direction of apse

The Lomnica Monastery (Serbian: Манастир Ломница, romanized: Manastir Lomnica), also known as the Lovnica Monastery, is the 16th century Serbian Orthodox monastery dedicated to Saint George. It is located near Šekovići in the region of Donji Birač in eastern Republika Srpska, Bosnia and Herzegovina.

The region of Donji Birač contains many medieval necropoleis with the characteristic stećak tombstones and other archaeological artifacts. The monastery's church and dormitory are built on a narrow flat area on a hillside beside a stream called Lomnica, from which the monastery received its name.

In the local accent, the consonant pair mn is often pronounced as vn, hence the form "Lovnica". As lov means "hunt" in Serbian, this gave rise to legendary accounts of the monastery's foundation that connect it in some way with hunting or hunters. According to one of the legends, the area of Lomnica was a hunting ground of the Serbian King Dragutin Nemanjić, and it was he who built this monastery.

However, Lomnica was founded around 1570, after the Ottoman Empire sanctioned the restoration of the Serbian Patriarchate of Peć. It was first mentioned in 1578 in an inscription in a liturgical book. Its founders and ktetors were monks Genadije and Akakije, who were probably merchants, craftsmen, or landowners before embracing monastic life. The iconostasis in the church was painted by Longin, who also painted icons in other Serbian monasteries of that time. The frescoes on the church's walls were finished in 1608, and one of the painters recorded that event on a wall. This inscription also relates that the painters were much harassed by Turks and softas, Islamic theological students known for their religious fanaticism and violence against Christians. Metropolitan of Dabar-Bosna Visarion visited Lovnica in 1693, which was also recorded on a wall.

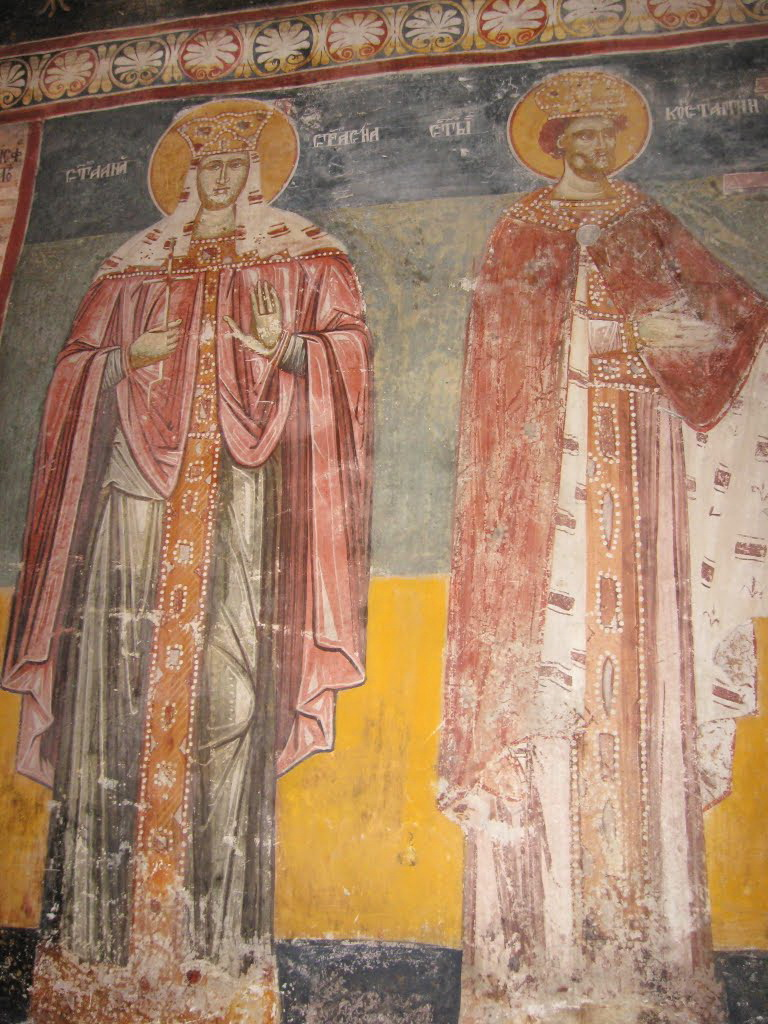
Fresco in the Lomnica church

The final stages and aftermath of the Great Turkish War (1683–1699) were detrimental to many monasteries in Bosnia, but Lomnica came out of it without significant damages. However, its monastic community left it and never returned. In 1705, it was repurposed as a parish church serving surrounding villages. During the 18th century it was often visited by monks, priests, and other people from Bosnia, Herzegovina, central Serbia, Kosovo, and Montenegro. Many of the visitors wrote inscriptions on the walls and other surfaces inside the church, recording their names and dates of visits. This practice continued into the 19th century, and the latest such inscription was written by a monk from Visoki Dečani in 1852. A rather long 18th-century inscription ends with the statement, "It is wrong to write here, but I saw it from [someone] older, so I erred too." There was a house by the church, in which the visitors could rest. Church services were held at Lomnica only on religious holidays.

The region of Donji Birač had a committee consisting of priests and prominent villagers, whose duties included the care about the Lomnica church. It was guarded by an armed man, paid by the committee; nevertheless, it was robbed in 1880. In the mid-19th century, a landslide half-covered its northern wall. Wet soil remained there for years, and the moisture caused significant damage to the frescoes on that wall. Supporting walls were built east and south of the church to prevent its sliding toward the stream. The church was re-roofed in 1823 and 1884. In World War II, Yugoslav Partisans created a large field hospital next to the church. It came out of the war without significant damages. The conservation-restoration of the frescoes and the iconostasis began in 1952. The dormitory was rebuilt, and a monastic community was re-established at Lomnica in 1979. The monastery was designated a National Monument of Bosnia and Herzegovina by KONS in 2005.

== See also ==
- List of Serbian Orthodox monasteries
