= Mehmed Šakir Kurtćehajić =

Bosnian journalist (1844–1872)

Beg Mehmed Šakir Kurtćehajić
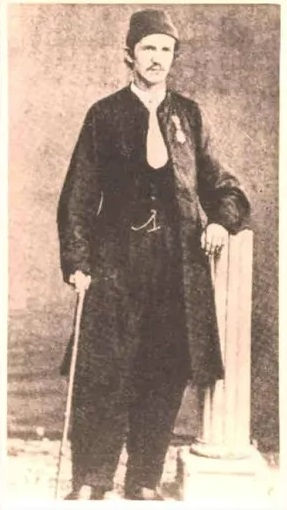
- Born: 1844; Bijelo Polje, Ottoman Empire
- Died: 1872 (aged 27–28); Vienna, Austria-Hungary
- Resting place: Central Cemetery, Vienna
- Occupations: Journalist; editor; publisher

Mehmed Šakir-beg Kurtćehajić (1844–1872) was a Bosnian journalist, the first Bosniak journalist, the founder of the printed word and journalism in the Bosnian language.

== Biography ==
He was born in Bijelo Polje (than part of Bosnia Eyalet) in 1844, in the family of Mehmed Kurtćehajić, who as a qadi served in several Bosnian cities. Mehmed Šakir Kurtćehajić was a self-taught. He first served as a scribe at the seat of the Sanjak of Pljevlja, then at the court of the Sanjak of Novi Pazar, before being transferred to Sarajevo, in the vilayet service. In 1866, he started writing in the newspaper Bosanski vjestnik, and then founded the first private Bosnian newspaper Sarajevski cvjetnik (Turkish: Gülşen-i-Saray). It was published weekly, on four pages, bilingually, with a comparative text in Turkish language with Ottoman Turkish Script and Bosnian language in Cyrillic script. He was the founder, editor and eventually the main financier of the Sarajevski cvjetnik. In 1869, Kurtćehajić was appointed to director of the Vilayet Printing House in Sarajevo. He was also an official interpreter for the Turkish language, a member of the Assembly of Vilayet (Majlisi-umumii-vilayet) and the President of the Beledija (municipality), thus the mayor of Sarajevo. Safvet-beg Bašagić called him the first swallow that heralded a spiritual revival in Bosnia and Herzegovina.

About his appointment as president of Beledija, Kurtćehajić said in the Sarajevski cvjetnik of January 8, 1872: "Since the previous president of Beledija was dismissed as incompetent, this duty was added to my previous service." With regard to the organization of the administration in the Ottoman Empire, Kurtćehajić became a member of the assembly of Vilayet in addition to the other duties he performed.

As the publisher, journalist and editor of the newspaper, he had a very good relationship with the reader. Since he himself worked in the newspaper it caused an interruption in the publication of the newspaper. He would announce these interruptions to the readers in advance and during that time he would also reduce the subscription to pre-numbered subscribers, as he called the subscribers. Upon his return from sick leave, he would once again address his readers with a warm words. Having contracted tuberculosis, on the advice of a doctor, in July 1872, he went to Vienna for treatment, where he died the same year at the age of 28. He was buried at the Central Cemetery in Vienna.

== Quotes ==
Newspapers are such a teacher that anyone who doesn't read or listen to them knows nothing about the world.

— Mehmed Šakir Kurtćehajić
