= Osječani Donji =

Osječani Donji Осјечани Доњи
- Village
- Location within Bosnia and Herzegovina
- Coordinates: 44°49′41″N 18°06′59″E
- Country: Bosnia and Herzegovina
- Entity: Republika Srpska
- Municipality: Doboj
- Time zone: UTC+1 (CET)
  - Summer (DST): UTC+2 (CEST)
- Republika Srpska, Doboj, Bosnia and Herzegovina: 74225
- Area code: (+387) 53

Osječani Donji (Serbian Cyrillic: Осјечани Доњи) is a village in the municipality of Doboj, Republika Srpska, Bosnia and Herzegovina.
