= Jane Gavalovski =

Macedonian footballer (born 1980)

Personal information
- Full name: Jane Gavalovski
- Date of birth: 6 June 1980 (age 46)
- Place of birth: Skopje, SFR Yugoslavia
- Height: 1.90 m (6 ft 3 in)
- Position: Striker

Senior career*
Years	Team	Apps	(Gls)
1997–1998	Mačva Šabac		
1998–2002	Rad	50	(5)
2003	PAS Giannina	15	(6)
2004	Rad	6	(4)
2004	Obilić	5	(1)
2005	Universitatea Craiova	1	(0)
2005–2006	Mačva Šabac		

Managerial career
- 2010-2012: Mačva Šabac
- 2019: Sloga Erdevik
- * Club domestic league appearances and goals

Jane Gavalovski (Macedonian: Јане Гаваловски; born on 6 June 1980) is a Macedonian football manager and retired player.

== Playing career ==
Born in Skopje, SR Macedonia, he started to play in the First League of FR Yugoslavia in 1998 with FK Rad where in five seasons made 50 matches scoring 5 goals. In January 2003, he moved to Super League Greece club PAS Giannina, but after they were relegated at the end of that season, he returned next January to FK Rad. In summer 2004 he moved to another Belgrade club, the 1997–98 Champions FK Obilić, but, after not getting many chances, decided to move to Romania to play in Universitatea Craiova. Since 2005, he played for the Serbian club FK Mačva Šabac where after retiring started the job as manager.
