= Mile Novković =

Yugoslav footballer (born 1950)

Personal information
- Full name: Miodrag Novković
- Date of birth: 14 December 1950 (age 75)
- Place of birth: Belgrade, SFR Yugoslavia
- Position: Midfielder

Senior career*
Years	Team	Apps	(Gls)
1969–1978	Red Star Belgrade	114	(5)
1978–1981	Eintracht Trier	100	(9)
Total		214	(14)
- * Club domestic league appearances and goals

Miodrag "Mile" Novković (Serbian Cyrillic: Миодраг "Миле" Новковић; born 14 December 1950) is a Yugoslav former professional footballer who played as a midfielder.
