= FK Sloboda Tuzla =

Bosnian football club

Sloboda Tuzla
- Full name: Fudbalski Klub Sloboda Tuzla
- Nickname: Crveno-crni (The Red-and-blacks)
- Founded: 30 November 1919; 106 years ago
- Ground: Stadion Tušanj
- Capacity: 7,200
- President: Azmir Husić
- Manager: Edis Mulalić
- League: First League of FBiH
- 2025–26: First League of FBiH, 3rd of 14
Home colours	Away colours

Fudbalski klub Sloboda Tuzla (English: Football Club Sloboda Tuzla) is a Bosnian professional football club based in Tuzla, Bosnia and Herzegovina. The English translation of the team's name is Football Club Freedom Tuzla.

The club is a member of the Football Association of Bosnia and Herzegovina and has been mostly active in the Premier League of Bosnia and Herzegovina, with a few stints in the First League of the Federation of Bosnia and Herzegovina, where it currently competes.

== History ==
=== Foundation ===
FK Sloboda Tuzla was founded in 1919, as a part of the Labour Sport Society Gorki, named after the great socialist Russian poet Maxim Gorky. The football club and the labour society was popular in a wide part of the sporting public in Tuzla and beyond. The club was formed on the initiative of the Tuzla branch of the newly formed Communist party of Yugoslavia, under the influence of the ideas of the October Revolution of 1917 and revolutionary movements in Yugoslavia and Bosnia and Herzegovina as its integral part.

After the initial congress of unification and the creation of the Socialist Labour Party (Communists) in Yugoslavia that took place in Vukovar, Croatia in 1919, the first conference of the Tuzla municipal organisation of the League of Communists of Yugoslavia took place on 17 October 1919 in Tuzla. The elected party council decided on the same day to start with the formation of a worker's sporting society. The official founding of the club took place in the end of October 1919, and gathering was led by Jovo Sretenović, Mato Vidović, Safet Hadžiefendić, Ljubko Simić, Niko Trifković and Petar Dugonjić.

The men elected into the first Board of directors of the club were: Leonard Bancher, Mato Vidović, Niko Trifković, Stjepan Brkljačić and Alfred Puhta, Mijo Cuvaj and Ahmed Mandžić, Franto Bauzek (locksmith), Emil Kranjčec, Jakov Čurić and Petar Dugonjić, Franjo Miškovski, Safet Hadžiefendić, August Mot and Karlo Schwartz. The origin of the original name of the sporting society, Gorki, was explained by Petar Dugonjić:

When the final preparations for the organising meeting were being dealt with, it was suggested that the club be named Sokolović, after Mićo Sokolović, a known worker's rights activist. Then Mitar Trifunović Učo noticed: "People, few will know that we named the Club after our Mića. Most will think of Mehmed-paša Sokolović". The practical Franjo Rezač insisted we go to the meeting with a concrete name suggestion. Mitar Trifunović then said: "If no one objects, I would suggest the club bears the name of Maxim Gorky". I remember it well. Afterwards the name was accepted with enthusiasm at the meeting.

The first headquarters of the club was in Rudarska Street in Tuzla, not far from where Skver is today. Afterwards the headquarters moved to the building of the Jewish Bank, then to the Grand Hotel and then back to Rudarska Street. The games were played on two fields – the first one was called the Communist playground between what today are the Chemical and Mechanical high-schools and the second one was the field where the Braća Ribar primary schools stands.

All the players were workers, and the Gorki first team had the following players: Mirko Veseli, Peri Mot, Karlo Krejči, Santo Altarac, Ivica Šifer, Franto Bauzek, Mijo Josić, Lorenc Ajhberger, Vili Zaboš, Slavko Zafani, Ahmed Mandžić, Alfred Puhta, Jozo Vikić, Malaga Mustačević, Dragoslav Stakić and several others. The coach was Brato Gamberger, former player of HŠK Zrinjski.

The club mostly played against other Tuzla football clubs. Namely, at the time of the formation of FK Gorki there were three other football clubs in Tuzla, Zrinjski, Obilić and Makabi, based around the Croatian, Serbian and Jewish population of Tuzla. In 1921 the Bosniak club Bura was also formed. Unlike these ethno-confessional clubs, FK Gorki was multiethnic and multicultural and accepted members of all faiths and ethnicities.

The official ground of Tuzla in this period was the field of HŠK Zrinjski built in 1928 on the road to Solina from Brčanska Malta with the help of Kalman Liska, a wood merchant and president of HŠK Zrinjski.

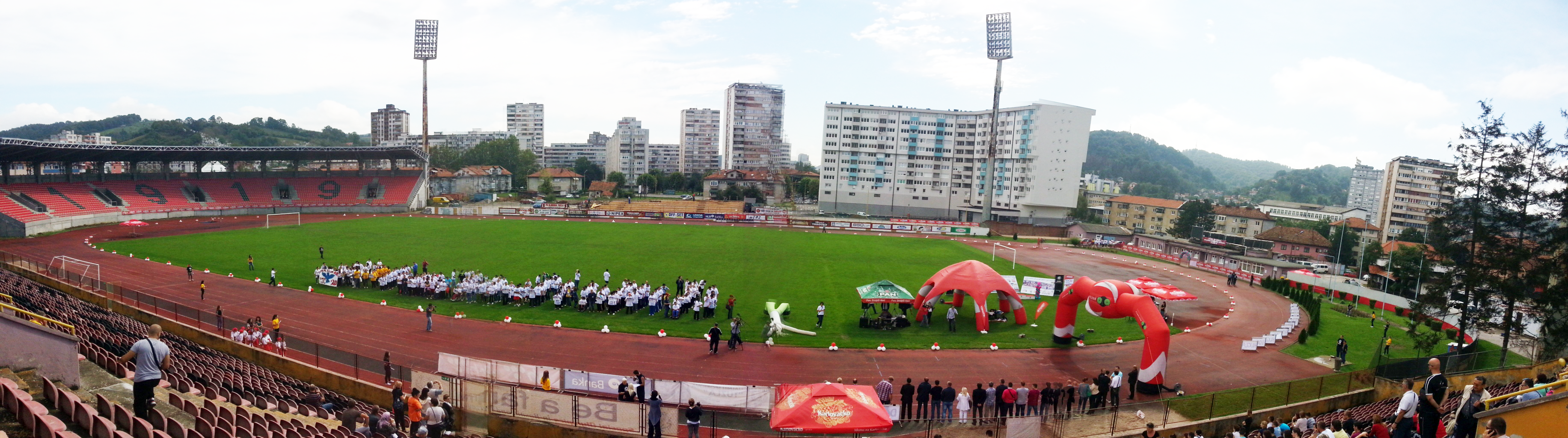
Panoramic view of the stadium

=== FK Sloboda ===
In 1924, because of the country-wide ban of communist activities, FK Gorki was banned by the government of the Kingdom of Serbs, Croats and Slovenes under the orders of the infamous Obznana. There was an attempt to form another worker's club, called Hajduk, but this was also banned in 1924.

==== Foundation and activity between 1927 and 1941 ====
Thanks to the perseverance of labour activists, on 20 November 1927 the Labour-cultural and sporting society Sloboda (Bosnian: Radničko-kulturno sportsko društvo Sloboda) was formed in Tuzla. The society initially had four sections: Sports, Tamburica, Choir and Amateur theatre. The first team of the sports section was: Karlo Mot, Nikola Kemenc, Suljo Nezirović, Alfred Puhta, Safet and Ešo Isabegović, Oto and Ivica Milinović, Josip Leder and Muho Mujezinović, Karlo Schwartz, Vlado Mileusnić, Jozo Kemenc, Rihard Žlebnik, Mujo Begić and many others.

In the beginning of 1928, the sports section becomes independent and renames itself to RSK Sloboda. Although officially under the influence of social-democrats, communists continue to have a substantial influence in the club, hence it is a continuation of the formerly banned FK Gorki. That is the reason the year of foundation is always considered to be 1919, the year when Gorki was formed and not 1928. The first game played by the new club was against FK Solvaj from Lukavac. Because of the discontinuation of several other Tuzla football clubs, like Obilić and Bura, many players transferred to Sloboda and in 1928 it had a formidable team that consisted of the following players: Asim Mulaosmanović, Muho Mujeznović, Dejan Vujasinović, Mujko Mešković, Meša Selimović, Abdurahman Mujezinović Smrt, Vlado Mileusnić, Karlo Mot, Ivan Majer and others. It is a very interesting fact that Mehmed Meša Selimović, one of the greatest Bosniak writers of all time, played in Sloboda at this period.

==== Re-foundation in SFRY and rise to the top (1945–1992) ====
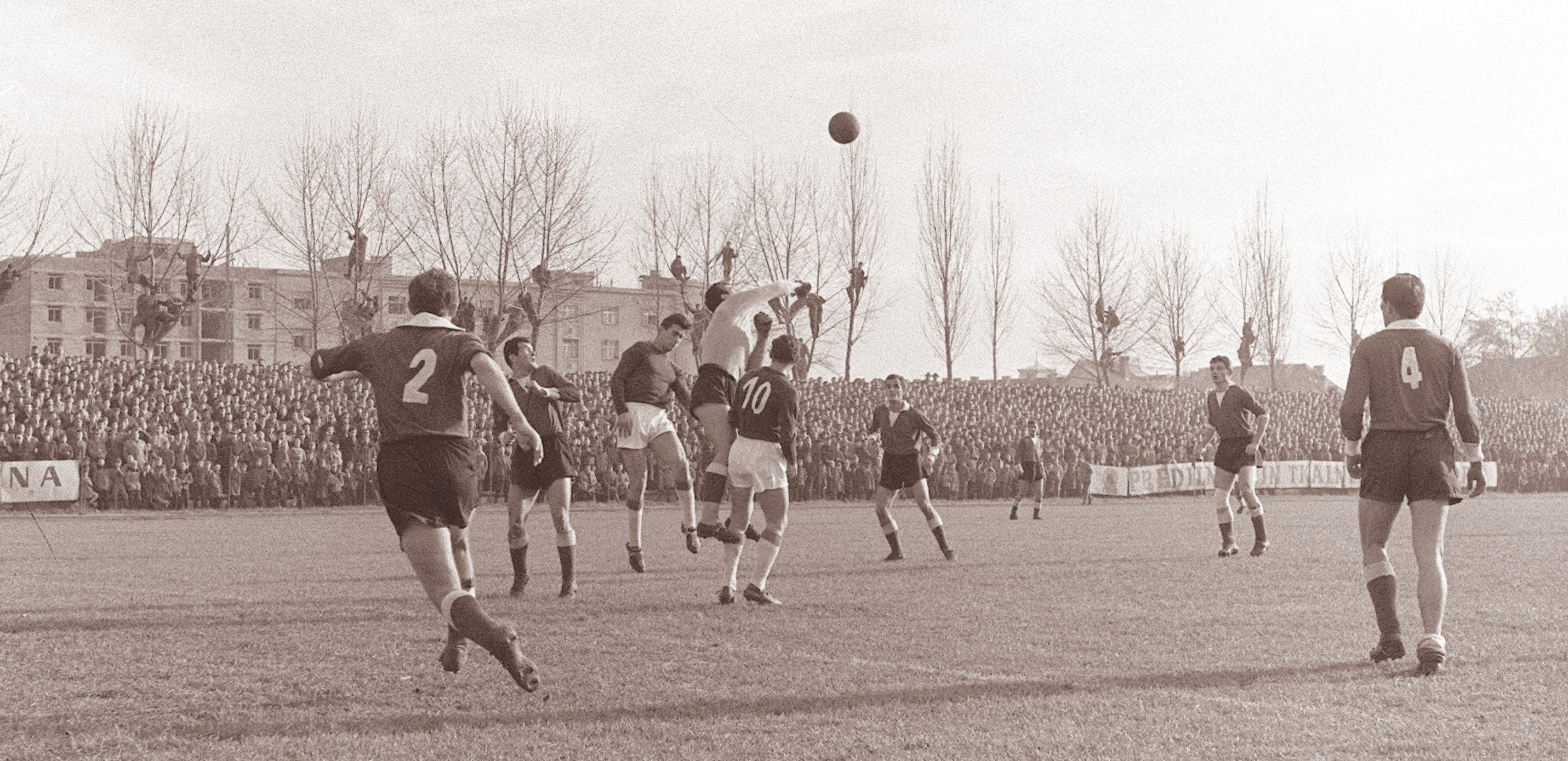
A 1961–62 Yugoslav Second League season match between Maribor and Sloboda on 3 December 1961.

FK Sloboda produced a number of notable players such as Cvijan Milošević, Mesud Nalić, Omer Jusić, Rizah Mešković, Mersed Kovačević, Fuad Mulahasanović, Ismet Hadžić, Dževad Šećerbegović, Mustafa Hukić, Midhat Memišević as well as young players members of the U-20 national team such as Isanović, Ćulumarević, Milošević, Hajrulahović, Jogunčić.

During the time of former Yugoslavia, FK Sloboda was active in the Yugoslav First League and the team had much success, despite never winning the title. The best result was achieved in 1977 when FK Sloboda has qualified for the UEFA cup 1977–78. Unfortunately, Las Palmas from Spain was stronger, 5–0 in Spain for Las Palmas and 4–3 for FK Sloboda in Tuzla.

=== Bosnian First League (1993–2000) ===
In 1991 Sloboda was to be relegated from 1st Yugoslav league, but after Croatian and Slovenian teams left Yugoslav 1st league Sloboda was there for season 1992 but left league with Željezničar, Sarajevo and Velež after breakout of war. Until 2000 Sloboda played First League of NFSBiH, after 2000 Sloboda played Premier League of Bosnia and Herzegovina.

Season 1994–1995 was first season of Bosnian First League, Sloboda won Tuzla Group but lost in First Play-off Round from Bosna Visoko, and reached finals of National Cup, but lost to Čelik Zenica.

Next season saw Sloboda winning third place in League, top scorer was Nedim Omerović with 17 goals, same thing happens again in Cup, losing to Čelik.

In season 1996–1997 Sloboda declined and ended up tenth in First League. In Season 1997–1998 Sloboda missed Championship Playoff with Croat teams by 3 points.

Season 1998–1999 was turbulent one, by the end of first half of championship Sloboda was in relegation zone, on winter Mustafa Hukić took club over and made great success by reaching fifth place.

Season 1999–2000 started with huge expectations, fans expected great things, but on 7 August manager of Sloboda Mustafa Hukić died in car crash, and Sloboda ended up in 7th place and runner up in 3 team finals of National Cup.

Number of great players played for team during these years such as Vedin Musić, Muhamed Konjić, Sakib Malkočević, Nedim Omerović.

=== Premier League, decline and relegation (2000–2012) ===
After 42 years, Sloboda got relegated from the top divisions (including both, Yugoslav and Bosnian football) to the First League of FBiH in the 2011–12 Premier League of Bosnia and Herzegovina season. They came back after their 2nd season of being relegated.

=== Return to top the flight (2014–2025) ===
In their first season after returning to the top tier (2014–15), Sloboda finished at 8th place, recording the 2nd best performance of the spring part of the season (8–4–3).

Sloboda was the league leader of the first part of the 2015–16 Bosnian Premier League season. Until March 2016, the team were on an 18-game unbeaten run in the Premier League of Bosnia and Herzegovina dating back to 18 November 2015. The club took 2nd league place that season, managing also to achieve the Bosnian Cup final which was lost by Radnik Bijeljina (11 May – Tuzla: 1–1, 18 May – Bijeljina: 0–3).

The season 2016–17 was followed by turbulence. The club's board changed when Azmir Husić decided to leave the chairman seat in September and was replaced with Senad Mujkanović. The club took 5th place in the league at the end. That season left the fans with memories on one of the best come backs when Sloboda hosted Zrinjski Mostar on 19 November 2016. Zrinski had 3–0 after 51 minutes, but the Tuzla-based team managed to tie the game in the end in only 18 minutes.

The 2017–18 league season was entire to forget when the club took 10th position, just one place above relegation zone. However, through the 2017–18 Bosnian Cup, under the guidance of then manager Slavko Petrović, Sloboda made it all the way to the semi-finals, losing 4–1 on aggregate to eventual winner, Željezničar.

On 29 March 2019, the club chairman, Senad Mujkanović left Sloboda and, Sead Kozlić was named for the new club's chairman. Not even seven months after Kozlić was named as the new chairman, on 15 October 2019, Kozlić decided to step down from the position, while on the next day, 16 October, Elmir Šećerbegović became the new FK Sloboda Tuzla club chairman.

On 18 December 2024, the club chairman, Azmir Husić, offered mutual termination to all players and the coaching staff mid-season due to unsatisfactory performance. After 17 matches, Sloboda was at the bottom of the league table with only 2 points and 5 goals scored.

== Supporters ==
Home team supporters occupy the north stand of Stadion Tušanj, and are known as Fukare Tuzla. The group was officially established in 1987. The initial name of the supporters group was Red-Black Killers in the early 1970s.

== Rivalry ==
Sloboda's main rival is Tuzla City, the other team from the city of Tuzla. The first match was played on 11 August 2018, when Tuzla City was the host. Sloboda won that game 1–0. Tuzla City's first derby win came on 31 August 2019, which finished 2–1 in favor of the younger Tuzla club.

== Honours ==
=== Domestic ===
==== League ====
- Premier League of Bosnia and Herzegovina:
  - Runners-up (1): 2015–16
- First League of the Federation of Bosnia and Herzegovina:
  - Winners (2): 2013–14, 2023–24
- Yugoslav First League:
  - Third place (1): 1976–77
- Yugoslav Second League:
  - Winners (1): 1958–59

==== Cups ====
- Bosnia and Herzegovina Cup:
  - Runners-up (6): 1994–95, 1995–96, 1999–2000, 2007–08, 2008–09, 2015–16
- Yugoslav Cup:
  - Runners-up (1): 1970–71
- Yugoslav League Cup (shared record):
  - Winners (1): 1971–72
  - Runners-up (1): 1972–73

=== European ===
- UEFA Intertoto Cup:
  - Winners (1): 1983 (Joint Winner)

== European record ==
As of 7 July 2016

Competition	Played	Won	Drew	Lost	GF	GA	GD	Win%
UEFA Cup / UEFA Europa League	4	1	1	2	4	9	−5	25.00
UEFA Intertoto Cup	8	2	2	4	7	12	−5	25.00
Total	12	3	3	6	11	21	−10	25.00

Legend: GF = Goals For. GA = Goals Against. GD = Goal Difference.

=== List of matches ===
Season	Competition	Round	Club	Home	Away	Agg.
1977–78	UEFA Cup	1R	(Spain) Las Palmas	4–3	0–5	4–8
2003	UEFA Intertoto Cup	1R	(Iceland) KA Akureyri	1–1	1–1	2–2 (2–3 p)
2003	UEFA Intertoto Cup	2R	(Belgium) Lierse	1–0	1–5	2–5
2004	UEFA Intertoto Cup	1R	(Slovenia) Celje	1–0	1–2	2–2 (a)
2004	UEFA Intertoto Cup	2R	(Slovakia) Spartak Trnava	0–1	1–2	1–3
2016–17	UEFA Europa League	1Q	(Israel) Beitar Jerusalem	0–0	0–1	0–1

== Players ==
=== Current squad ===
As of 21 July 2026

Note: Flags indicate national team as defined under FIFA eligibility rules; some limited exceptions apply. Players may hold more than one non-FIFA nationality.

No.	Pos.	Nation	Player
3	DF	CAN	Ahmad Mansour
4	DF	BIH	Hamza Redzić
5	DF	BIH	Salih Husić
6	DF	BIH	Tarik Saletović
7	MF	BIH	Omar Pršeš
9	FW	BIH	Nermin Bijelonja
10	MF	BIH	Mirzad Mehanović
11	FW	BIH	Ermin Huseinbašić
13	GK	BIH	Azir Muminović
18	DF	BIH	Amar Joguncić

No.	Pos.	Nation	Player
21	MF	BIH	Ajdin Beganović
22	MF	BIH	Adnan Šećerović
28	FW	SRB	Nikola Komazec
29	MF	BIH	Miljan Govedarica
47	FW	BIH	Vedad Abidovic
77	MF	BIH	Haris Hasanović
92	GK	GER	Manuel Jurkić
99	DF	BIH	Adin Husejinović
—	FW	CRO	Josip Sušić

== Managerial history ==
- (Socialist Federal Republic of Yugoslavia) Bela Palfi (1959–1963)
- (Socialist Federal Republic of Yugoslavia) Josip Takač (1962–1963)
- (Socialist Federal Republic of Yugoslavia) Đorđe Bjelogrlić (1967–1969)
- (Socialist Federal Republic of Yugoslavia) Dušan Varagić (1969–1970)
- (Socialist Federal Republic of Yugoslavia) Munib Saračević (1970)
- (Socialist Federal Republic of Yugoslavia) Josip Duvančić (1970–1976)
- (Socialist Federal Republic of Yugoslavia) Đorđe Gerum (1976–1978)
- (Socialist Federal Republic of Yugoslavia) Branimir Bevanda (1978–1979)
- (Socialist Federal Republic of Yugoslavia) Đorđe Gerum (1979–1981)
- (Socialist Federal Republic of Yugoslavia) Faruk Pašić (1981–1983)
- (Socialist Federal Republic of Yugoslavia) Omer Jusić (1983–1984)
- (Socialist Federal Republic of Yugoslavia) Fahrudin Avdičević (1984–1985)
- (Socialist Federal Republic of Yugoslavia) Faruk Pašić (1985–1987)
- (Socialist Federal Republic of Yugoslavia) Radomir Jovičić (1987)
- (Socialist Federal Republic of Yugoslavia) Đorđe Gerum (1987–1988)
- (Socialist Federal Republic of Yugoslavia) Josip Duvančić (1988)
- (Socialist Federal Republic of Yugoslavia) Radomir Jovičić (1988–1990)
- (Socialist Federal Republic of Yugoslavia) Rizah Mešković (1990)
- (Socialist Federal Republic of Yugoslavia) Mesud Nalić (1991)
- (Bosnia and Herzegovina) Mustafa Hukić (1 June 1994 – 30 June 1996)
- (Bosnia and Herzegovina) (Bosnia and Herzegovina) Nedžad Verlašević (1 July 1996 – 30 June 1998)
- (Bosnia and Herzegovina) Mustafa Hukić (1 July 1998 – 7 August 1999)
- (Bosnia and Herzegovina) Abdulah Ibraković (1 September 2002 – 31 May 2003)
- (Bosnia and Herzegovina) Sakib Malkočević (1 July 2008 – 24 July 2009)
- (Bosnia and Herzegovina) Nermin Hadžiahmetović (5 September 2009 – 5 November 2009)
- (Bosnia and Herzegovina) Adnan Osmanhodžić (interim) (9 November 2009 – 8 December 2009)
- (Bosnia and Herzegovina) Sakib Malkočević (interim) (9 December 2009 – 25 December 2009)
- (Bosnia and Herzegovina) Vlatko Glavaš (7 January 2010 – 27 October 2010)
- (Bosnia and Herzegovina) Denis Sadiković (27 October 2010 – 8 March 2011)
- (Bosnia and Herzegovina) Ibrahim Crnkić (9 March 2011 – 25 September 2011)
- (Bosnia and Herzegovina) Darko Vojvodić (5 October 2011 – 30 April 2012)
- (Bosnia and Herzegovina) Vedran Kovačević (interim) (30 April 2012 – 3 May 2012)
- (Bosnia and Herzegovina) Abdulah Ibraković (3 May 2012 – 18 September 2012)
- (Bosnia and Herzegovina) Denis Sadiković (20 September 2012 – 9 February 2013)
- (Bosnia and Herzegovina) Smajil Karić (16 February 2013 – 11 January 2014)
- (Croatia) Miroslav Blažević (17 January 2014 – 3 June 2014)
- (Bosnia and Herzegovina) Denis Sadiković (1 July 2014 – 27 September 2014)
- (Portugal) Acácio Casimiro (30 September 2014 – 15 January 2015)
- (Bosnia and Herzegovina) Husref Musemić (15 January 2015 – 11 September 2016)
- (Bosnia and Herzegovina) Amir Spahić (interim) (11 September 2016 – 11 October 2016)
- (Bosnia and Herzegovina) Vlado Jagodić (11 October 2016 – 10 September 2017)
- (Serbia) Slavko Petrović (11 September 2017 – 8 June 2018)
- (Bosnia and Herzegovina) Milenko Bošnjaković (8 June 2018 – 31 July 2018)
- (Bosnia and Herzegovina) Zlatan Nalić (31 July 2018 – 3 June 2019)
- (Bosnia and Herzegovina) Mile Lazarević (18 June 2019 – 28 September 2019)
- (Bosnia and Herzegovina) Gradimir Crnogorac (interim) (1 October 2019 – 7 October 2019)
- (Slovenia) Marijan Bloudek (7 October 2019 – 18 October 2019)
- (Bosnia and Herzegovina) Milenko Bošnjaković (18 October 2019 – 13 December 2019)
- (Bosnia and Herzegovina) Gradimir Crnogorac (18 December 2019 – 9 March 2021)
- (Bosnia and Herzegovina) Mladen Žižović (15 March 2021 – 24 March 2022)
- (Bosnia and Herzegovina) Amir Spahić (interim) (24 March 2022 – 23 June 2022)
- (Bosnia and Herzegovina) Adnan Jahić (23 June 2022 – 14 March 2023)
- (Croatia) Danijel Pranjić (22 March 2023 – 12 June 2023)
- (Bosnia and Herzegovina) Zlatan Nalić (24 July 2023 – 25 July 2024)
- (Bosnia and Herzegovina) Marko Maksimović (26 July 2024 – 28 September 2024)
- (Bosnia and Herzegovina) Zlatan Nalić (16 October 2024 – 17 December 2024)
- (Bosnia and Herzegovina) Igor Janković (9 January 2025 – 11 October 2025)
- (Bosnia and Herzegovina) Denis Karić (14 October 2025 – 16 March 2026)
- (Bosnia and Herzegovina) Adnan Hodžić (19 March 2026 – 31 August 2026)
- (Bosnia and Herzegovina) Edis Mulalić (8 September 2026 – present)

== Presidents ==
- (Socialist Federal Republic of Yugoslavia) Ante Raos
- (Bosnia and Herzegovina) Salko Bukvarević
- (Bosnia and Herzegovina) Enver Bijedić
- (Bosnia and Herzegovina) Salih Šabović
- (Bosnia and Herzegovina) Davud Zahirović
- (Bosnia and Herzegovina) Mersad Kovačević
- (Bosnia and Herzegovina) Azmir Husić
- (Bosnia and Herzegovina) Senad Mujkanović
- (Bosnia and Herzegovina) Sead Kozlić
- (Bosnia and Herzegovina) Elmir Šećerbegović
