= Aleksandar Miličić =

Serbian footballer and coach (1946–2021)

Personal information
- Date of birth: 1946
- Place of birth: Šabac, FPR Yugoslavia
- Date of death: 12 March 2021 (aged 74–75)
- Place of death: Šabac, Serbia
- Position: Defender

Senior career*
Years	Team	Apps	(Gls)
1963–1966	Mačva Šabac		
1966–1969	Voždovački		
1969–1978	Sloboda Tuzla		

Managerial career
- Mačva Šabac
- 1995-1996: Badnjevac
- * Club domestic league appearances and goals

Aleksandar Miličić (Serbian Cyrillic: Александар Миличић; 1946 – 12 March 2021) was a Serbian professional footballer and coach.

== Career ==
Miličić, born in Šabac, played for local club Mačva Šabac from 1963 to 1966 before moving to Voždovački, where he played until 1969. He then transferred to Sloboda Tuzla where he played in over 475 matches.

He was a member of the Sloboda generation that was third in 1976–77 and played in the 1977–78 UEFA Cup where they were eliminated by Las Palmas in the first round. After retiring, he worked as a coach.

== Death ==
Miličić, who suffered from Alzheimer's disease, disappeared on 5 March 2021 after midnight. His frozen body was found next to the Mačva Šabac stadium a week later on 12 March 2021.
