= Muhamed Glavović =

Bosnian footballer (1943–2025)

- Glavović in the 1960s

Personal information
- Date of birth: 26 December 1943
- Place of birth: Mostar, Independent State of Croatia
- Date of death: 22 July 2025 (aged 81)
- Place of death: Mostar
- Position: Forward

Senior career*
| Years | Team | Apps | (Gls) |
| 1962–1970 | Velež Mostar | 149 | (18) |
| 1971 | Sloboda Užice | 17 | (0) |
| 1972 | Radnički Niš | 3 | (0) |
- * Club domestic league appearances and goals

Muhamed Glavović (26 December 1943 – 22 July 2025) was a Bosnian footballer who played as a forward.

== Career ==
Born in Mostar, in the middle of the Second World War, he played with the local club FK Velež Mostar. where he played almost throughout the 1960s. Later, he also played with Sloboda Užice and Radnički Niš.

== Personal life and death ==
Glavović was born on 26 December 1943, and died on 22 July 2025, at the age of 81.
