= Selimir Milošević =

Serbian footballer (1940–2026)

Personal information
- Date of birth: 4 April 1940
- Place of birth: Šabac, Kingdom of Yugoslavia
- Date of death: May 2026 (aged 86)
- Place of death: Beograd, Serbia
- Positions: Centre-forward; left winger

Youth career
- Mačva Šabac
- Red Star Belgrade

Senior career*
Years	Team	Apps	(Gls)
1958–1966	Red Star Belgrade	68	(27)
1967–1968	Oakland Clippers	34	(28)
1969–1970	Red Star	41	(20)
1971	Arago		
1971–1972	Radnički Kragujevac	13	(3)

Managerial career
- ?–1979: Stade Tunisien
- 1980: Panionios
- 1990–1994: Pelita Jaya
- * Club domestic league appearances and goals

Selimir "Sele" Milošević (Serbian Cyrillic: Селимир "Селе" Милошевић; 4 April 1940 – May 2026) was a Serbian football player and manager. He primarily played for Red Star Belgrade within his native Yugoslavia throughout the 1960s and playing abroad for the Oakland Clippers and Red Star as a centre-forward.

== Playing career ==
Milošević made his debut during the latter half of the 1957–58 Yugoslav First League. His tenure with the club would experience ups and downs as despite being part of the winning squads for the 1958–59, 1959–60 and the 1963–64 Yugoslav First League but would also experience major slumps such as a 6–2 beating against Velež Mostar on 25 June 1966 during the 1965–66 Yugoslav First League and the 7–1 defeat against Fiorentina with Milošević scoring the only goal for Red Star. Despite his final season generally being considered his best with 18 appearances and 11 goals, the arrival of Miljan Miljanić and his project with younger players meant that many older players had to seek opportunities elsewhere. Thus, alongside manager Ivan Toplak, he played abroad in the United States for the Oakland Clippers. In the only season of the National Professional Soccer League, he was a part of the winning squad for the tournament as he went on to make 34 total appearances and score 28 goals in his two seasons with the club.

He then played in the Ligue 1 for Red Star FC throughout the 1969–70 season, becoming their top scorer with 13 goals in 26 matches. Following a brief tenure with Arago in the first half of the 1971–72 French Division 3, he returned to Yugoslavia to play for Radnički Kragujevac before retiring.

== Managerial career ==
Milošević began coaching various clubs in Yugoslavia throughout the lower leagues before coaching abroad in Tunisia with Stade Tunisien throughout the late 1970s. He then went to Greece to serve as an interim manager for Panionios following the sudden departure of Lakis Petropoulos. His most successful tenure was with Indonesian club Pelita Jaya throughout the early 1990s as he won the 1990 and the 1993–94 Galatama. He was also selected as a candidate manager for his club of Red Star Belgrade but was ultimately not chosen.

== Death ==
Milošević died in May 2026, at the age of 86.
