= Solina, Tuzla =

Solina Tuzla
- Location of Tuzla within Bosnia and Herzegovina (dark blue).
- Coordinates: 44°33′38″N 18°41′50″E
- Country: Bosnia and Herzegovina
- Canton: Tuzla Canton
- Time zone: UTC+1 (CET)
  - Summer (DST): UTC+2 (CEST)
- Area code: +387 35

Solina is a part of city Tuzla, Bosnia and Herzegovina. It is located at the northeast side of the city. It is famous due to the ancient town of Gradovrh which was located in Solina. The name Solina comes from the world Sol which stands for Salt in local languages.
