= Vilayet Printing House (Sarajevo) =

Official printing house of the Ottoman Vilayet of Bosnia (1866–1878)

Coordinates: 43.8573°N 18.4334°E

Sopron's Printing House (April–October 1866) Vilayet Printing House (October 1866 – August 1878)
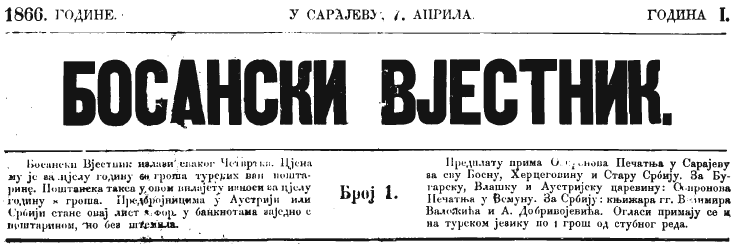
- Nameplate of Bosanski vjestnik, the first newspaper to be published in Bosnia and Herzegovina
- Status: Defunct (1878)
- Founded: 1866
- Founder: Ignjat Sopron
- Country of origin: Ottoman Empire
- Headquarters location: Sarajevo
- Distribution: Vilayet of Bosnia
- Publication types: Newspapers, books
- Nonfiction topics: Politics, law, education, culture, religion
- Owners: Ignjat Sopron (April–October 1866); Government of the Vilayet of Bosnia (October 1866 – August 1878)

The Vilayet Printing House (Serbo-Croatian: Вилајетска штампарија/ Vilajetska štamparija), originally named Sopron's Printing House (Сопронова печатња, Sopronova pečatnja), was the official printing house of the Ottoman Vilayet of Bosnia from April 1866 until the occupation of the province by Austria-Hungary in August 1878. It was the second printing house that operated in the territory of present-day Bosnia and Herzegovina, founded in Sarajevo almost 350 years after the Goražde printing house ceased its activity. Its founder was Ignjat Sopron, a publisher and printer from Zemun, who sold the establishment to the Government of the Vilayet of Bosnia in October 1866. Its foundation happened in the context of modernising and Europeanising Tanzimat reforms in the Ottoman Empire. Its principal aim was to issue an official gazette of the vilayet and publish textbooks for the elementary schools of Bosnian Serbs and Croats, thus stopping their import from the Principality of Serbia and the Austrian Empire.

The first newspaper to be published in Bosnia and Herzegovina was Bosanski vjestnik, a political-informative and educational weekly edited by Sopron and printed in Serbian Cyrillic. It had a pro-Serb inclination, though it generally promoted a unitary Bosnian nation, in accordance with the Ottoman policy in the province. The official gazette, the weekly Bosna, was primarily concerned with publishing and explaining laws, orders, and proclamations. Another weekly issued by the printing house was Sarajevski cvjetnik, which fiercely defended the Ottoman regime and polemicised with Serbian and Austrian newspapers that criticised it. Bosna and Sarajevski cvjetnik were bilingual, printed half in Ottoman Turkish and half in Serbo-Croatian in the Cyrillic script. The printing house produced a number of elementary school textbooks, including the second Serbian alphabet book using the reformed Serbian Cyrillic, following Vuk Karadžić's book published in Vienna in 1827. Other books include a collection of Bosnian Serb lyric folk poetry, an Ottoman Turkish grammar, and several Jewish religious books. The first printed exemplar of Bosnian Aljamiado literature was also published by the Vilayet Printing House. It produced around 50 books and booklets altogether, most of them being concerned with various Ottoman laws and legislation.

== Background ==
The Goražde printing house was one of the earliest among the Serbs and the first in the territory of present-day Bosnia and Herzegovina. It was founded by Božidar Ljubavić near the town of Goražde in 1519, in the early period of Ottoman rule over the region. It produced three Orthodox religious books, including the Goražde Psalter, with its last book printed in 1523. The next printing house would not be opened in Bosnia and Herzegovina until the second half of the 19th century.

In the first half of the 19th century, the Ottoman Empire was swept by a wave of reforms meant to centralise and Europeanise the government of the state. Bosnian Muslim feudal lords rejected the reforms and repeatedly revolted against the Sultan. The Ottoman military intervened in the Eyalet of Bosnia in 1831 and 1850, crushing the local feudal lords, and the set of modernising reforms known as the Tanzimat began to be implemented in the province. The Christians were underprivileged in the Ottoman Empire, and this was even more so in Bosnia than in the rest of the empire. An improvement in this respect occurred in 1862, when the Bosnian Christians (Orthodox Serbs and Catholic Croats) were granted more rights, including those to open new churches and to run their own schools. This came after several uprisings by the Christians, especially Serbs, who had the strongest national movement in the province. Ivan Franjo Jukić and other Bosnian Franciscans requested the right to establish a printing house in 1847, 1850, 1853, and 1857, but each time their requests were denied by the Ottoman government.

The reforms became firmly rooted in Bosnia during the 1860s, when the Ottoman governor (vali) of the province was Topal Sherif Osman Pasha, though most of the changes proceeded at a slow pace. According to the recently issued Ottoman constitutional law, each vilayet (first-order administrative division) was to have an official printing house and an official gazette. The Constitutional Law for the Vilayet of Bosnia, published in 1865, promoted the province from the rank of eyalet to that of vilayet, and Article 9 of this law stipulated that there be an official printing house in its capital. Osman Pasha also had other motivations to establish a printing house. At that time, the press in the Principality of Serbia and in South Slavic parts of the Austrian Empire sharply criticised the Ottoman regime in Bosnia. Textbooks imported from Serbia for Serb elementary schools in Bosnia also disseminated nationalist sentiment, which Osman Pasha saw as anti-Ottoman. In his view, the national movement of the Serbs in Bosnia presented a danger for Ottoman state interests. To protect their hold on Bosnia, the Ottomans sought to promote the idea of a unitary Bosnian nation, thus counteracting the particular national identities and political aspirations of Bosnia's Serbs, Croats, and Muslims.

== History and publications ==
=== Under Sopron ===
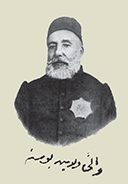
Topal Sherif Osman Pasha

Shortly after the Constitutional Law for the Vilayet of Bosnia was issued, Osman Pasha invited publishing magnate Ignjat Sopron to Sarajevo. Sopron was the owner and manager of a publishing and printing house in Zemun (then part of the Austrian Empire, today one of the municipalities of Belgrade, Serbia). An ethnic German, he was born in 1821 in Novi Sad as Ignaz Karl Soppron. Upon his arrival in Sarajevo, Osman Pasha offered him a subsidy to establish and organise a printing house. It was to be headquartered in a building on Sarajevo's Dugi sokak street that was being rented by the vilayet's government. Sopron soon came to the city bringing with him printing tools and materials, accompanied by a typesetter from Belgrade, Ilija Tomić. Tomić was in charge of the Cyrillic and Latin letters, and he engaged three graduated students of the Serb secondary school in Sarajevo to be his trainees. Osman Pasha also invited a man named Kadri-effendi from Istanbul to work as the typesetter for Arabic letters. The principal aim of the printing house was to issue an official gazette and to publish elementary school textbooks, thus stopping their import from Serbia and Austria.

Sopronova pečatnja, or Sopron's Printing House, was officially opened on 19 April [O.S. 7 April] 1866. The Cyrillic orthography that was used in it was consistently in accordance with the linguistic reform of Serbian philologist Vuk Karadžić, which was at that time relatively new and still not universally accepted. The first issue of a political-informative and educational weekly newspaper named Bosanski vjestnik (Serbian Cyrillic: Босански вјестник, "Bosnian Herald") appeared on the same day. This was the first newspaper ever to be published in Bosnia and Herzegovina. Sopron made a deal with the vilayet's authorities to publish it independently from the official gazette. When Sopron presented the editorial policy of his newspaper to the authorities, he indicated that it would be printed in the Serbian language, much to the Ottomans' displeasure. The authorities subsequently scratched "Serbian" and replaced it with "Bosnian". Sopron accepted the revision and went along with Osman Pasha's idea of promoting a unitary Bosnian nation. Nevertheless, Bosanski vjestnik had "a decidedly Serb orientation". Sopron did not consider this contradictory, as he apparently identified Bosnian-ness with Serbness. In the newspaper, the language was occasionally referred to as Serbo-Bosnian, while both the Serb and the Croat ethnic designations were expressed.

The first issue of the official gazette, named Bosna (Ottoman Turkish: بوسنه; Cyrillic: Босна, "Bosnia"), appeared on 28 May [O.S. 16 May] 1866, i.e., 13 Muharram 1283 AH. It was a bilingual weekly with half of the pages printed in Ottoman Turkish in the Arabic script, and the other half printed in Serbo-Croatian in the Cyrillic script. The text in Serbo-Croatian was a faithful translation of that in Turkish. The gazette was primarily concerned with publishing and explaining laws, orders, and proclamations, but it also provided news from the political, economic, cultural, and social life of the vilayet. It would be issued without interruption for more than twelve years, and for much of that period it was the only newspaper in the Vilayet of Bosnia. It had different editors over time: Mustafa Rifet Imamović, Mehmed Šakir Kurtćehajić, Salih Biogradlija, Javer Baruh, Nurudin Kurtćehajić, and Kadri-effendi. Most of them were Bosnian Muslims, except Baruh (a Jew) and Kadri-effendi (a Turk). A constant in the gazette was its translator from Turkish, Miloš Mandić, a polyglot who had previously worked as a teacher in a Serb elementary school in Prijepolje. Besides Sopron, Mandić was one of the contributors to Bosanski vjestnik, along with Bogoljub Petranović and Salih Sidki Hadžihuseinović. Petranović was the manager of the Serb secondary school in Sarajevo and the leader of the Serb youth movement in the city, while Hadžihuseinović was an official of the Gazi Husrev-beg Mosque. In August 1866, the printing house published its first book, Lesson on Man and His Duties (Наравоученије о човеку и његовим дужностима), translated from Greek by Georgije Jovanović.

=== Under the vilayet government ===
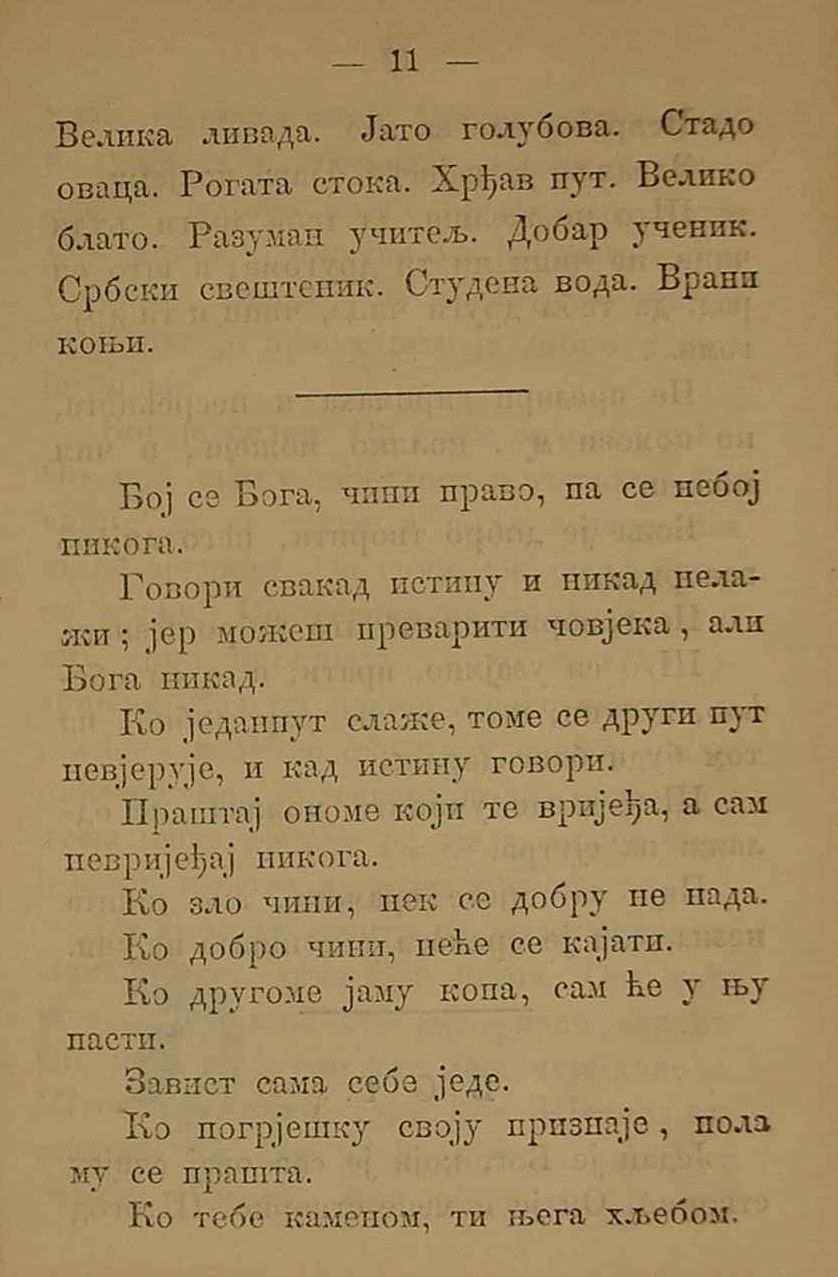
Mandić's alphabet book, page 11

In October 1866, Sopron sold the establishment to the Government of the Vilayet of Bosnia. It was renamed Vilajetska pečatnja, or the Vilayet Printing House, and from March 1867 onwards it bore the name Vilajetska štamparija (the same meaning). Sopron remained the owner and editor of Bosanski vjestnik, and managed to publish 51 issues. After a year in Sarajevo, Sopron left the city and returned to Zemun. The first director of the printing house was Haim Davičo, a Belgrade Jew, who was offered that position by Osman Pasha. Mehmed Šakir Kurtćehajić, the editor of Bosna since early 1868, began publishing Sarajevski cvjetnik at the end of that year. It was a bilingual weekly like Bosna, containing commentaries on current politics and articles on various social issues, most of which was written by Kurtćehajić. He fiercely defended the Ottoman regime in Bosnia, polemicising with newspapers from Serbia and Austria which criticised it. In May 1869, when Osman Pasha ceased to be the governor of the Vilayet of Bosnia, Davičo returned to Belgrade. The new governor installed Kurtćehajić as the director of the printing house. Kurtćehajić died of tuberculosis in September 1872; the last issue of Sarajevski cvjetnik had appeared two months earlier.

Kurtćehajić's death marked the end of a prosperous period for the Vilayet Printing House. Its subsequent directors were less capable, and the establishment's condition began to deteriorate. In 1877, the last Ottoman governor of Bosnia installed Kadri-effendi as director, and he significantly improved the condition of the printing house. Austro-Hungarian troops entered Sarajevo on 19 August 1878, marking the start of 40 years of Austro-Hungarian occupation. Four days later, General Josip Filipović, the Austro-Hungarian commander in Sarajevo, transferred the management of the printing house from Kadri-effendi to an Austrian official. This spelled the end of the Vilayet Printing House, which was renamed Zemaljska štamparija (National Printing Press), and continued its work as the official printing house of the Condominium of Bosnia and Herzegovina. The last, 636th, issue of Bosna appeared shortly before the end of Ottoman rule over Bosnia, on 30 July [O.S. 18 July] 1878.

Apart from the newspapers Bosanski vjestnik, Bosna, and Sarajevski cvjetnik, the Vilayet Printing House published around fifty books and booklets in Serbo-Croatian, Ottoman Turkish, and Hebrew. While most of these publications were concerned with various Ottoman laws and legislation, the printing house also published a number of textbooks. The textbooks for Serb elementary schools in the vilayet were prepared by Miloš Mandić on the basis of those that were used in Serbia. These include an alphabet book (Буквар), a short Biblical history (Кратка свештена историја), a basal reader (Прва читанка), and the First Knowledges (Прва знања); they were published in 1867 and 1868. Mandić's alphabet book, the printing house's first textbook, was the second Serbian alphabet book using the reformed Serbian Cyrillic. The First Serbian Alphabet Book (Први Српски Буквар), authored by Vuk Karadžić, had been published in Vienna in 1827. The original plan was to print fifteen textbooks for Serb schools, ranging in subject from grammar, arithmetic, geography and religious teaching, but only four were printed. Although they were based on the textbooks used in Serbia, the vilayet's authorities made sure that every mention of Serbs and the Serbian language was erased from them.

Bogoljub Petranović collected Bosnian Serb lyric folk poems and published them in 1867 in a separate book (Српске народне пјесме из Босне (Женске)). The First Bosnian-Serb Calendar for the Common Year 1869 (Први босанско-српски календар за просту годину 1869), consisting of 58 pages, was edited by Jovan R. Džinić. In Serbian tradition, calendars contained more than just calendarical data and were also popular literary and educational almanacs. Džinić's calendar had more of an educational, rather than literary, character. It also included a collection of advice that was traditionally presented to journeymen during the testir ceremony of the guild of tailors in Sarajevo, in which a journeyman was promoted to a master craftsman. This is the only known text of this kind, beside a manuscript written in 1841 for the guild of goldsmiths.

Catholic school textbooks in the vilayet included a geography book (Kratka zemljopisna početnica s dodatkom o Bosni, 1869) by Franjo Ž. Franjković, an alphabet book with elements of religious education (Bukvar s napomenkom članakah nauka vjere za katoličku mladež u Bosni, 1869), and another geography book (Početni zemljopis za katoličke učionice u Bosni, 1871) by the Franciscan Grgo Martić. The Catholic bishop of Mostar Paškal Buconjić financed the printing of an Ottoman Turkish grammar in 1871. The Hebrew books included Meshek Beti (משק ביתי) and Appe Zutre (אפי זוטרי), which list religious observances, respectively, on Shabbat and Passover, and a small liturgical book titled Tikkun Moda'ah. These were composed around 1875 by the Sarajevo Rabbi Eliezer Papo. The printing house also published the first printed work of Bosnian Aljamiado literature, the book Sehletul-Vusul, which contained the principal teachings of Islam. It was composed by Omer Humo, the mufti of Mostar.
