= Fuad Mulahasanović =

Bosnian footballer and coach

Personal information
- Full name: Fuad Mulahasanović
- Date of birth: 26 September 1952 (age 74)
- Place of birth: Sarajevo, FPR Yugoslavia
- Position: Midfielder

Youth career
- 1962–1970: Sloboda Tuzla

Senior career*
| Years | Team | Apps | (Gls) |
| 1970–1981 | Sloboda Tuzla | 262 | (55) |
| 1981–1982 | Aris | 29 | (3) |
| Total | | 291 | (58) |

Managerial career
- 1992: Sloboda Tuzla
- * Club domestic league appearances and goals

Fuad Mulahasanović (born 16 October 1952) is a Bosnian retired footballer and current coach.

== Notes ==
1. At the time of his birth, Sarajevo was the capital of the People's Republic of Bosnia and Herzegovina which was a constituent republic of the Federal People's Republic of Yugoslavia. Sarajevo is now the capital of Bosnia and Herzegovina.
